= 1921 San Diego mayoral election =

- April 5, 1921
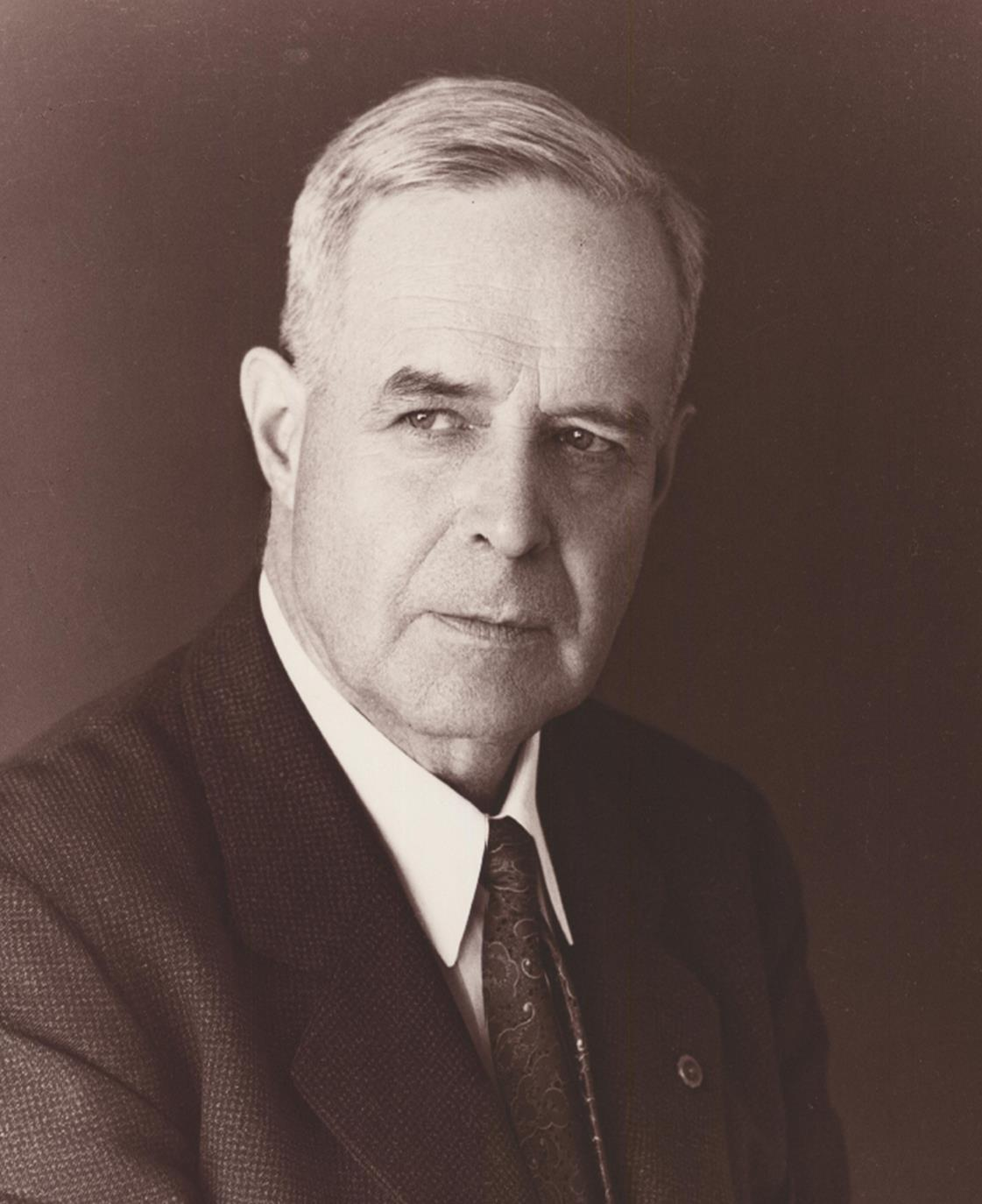

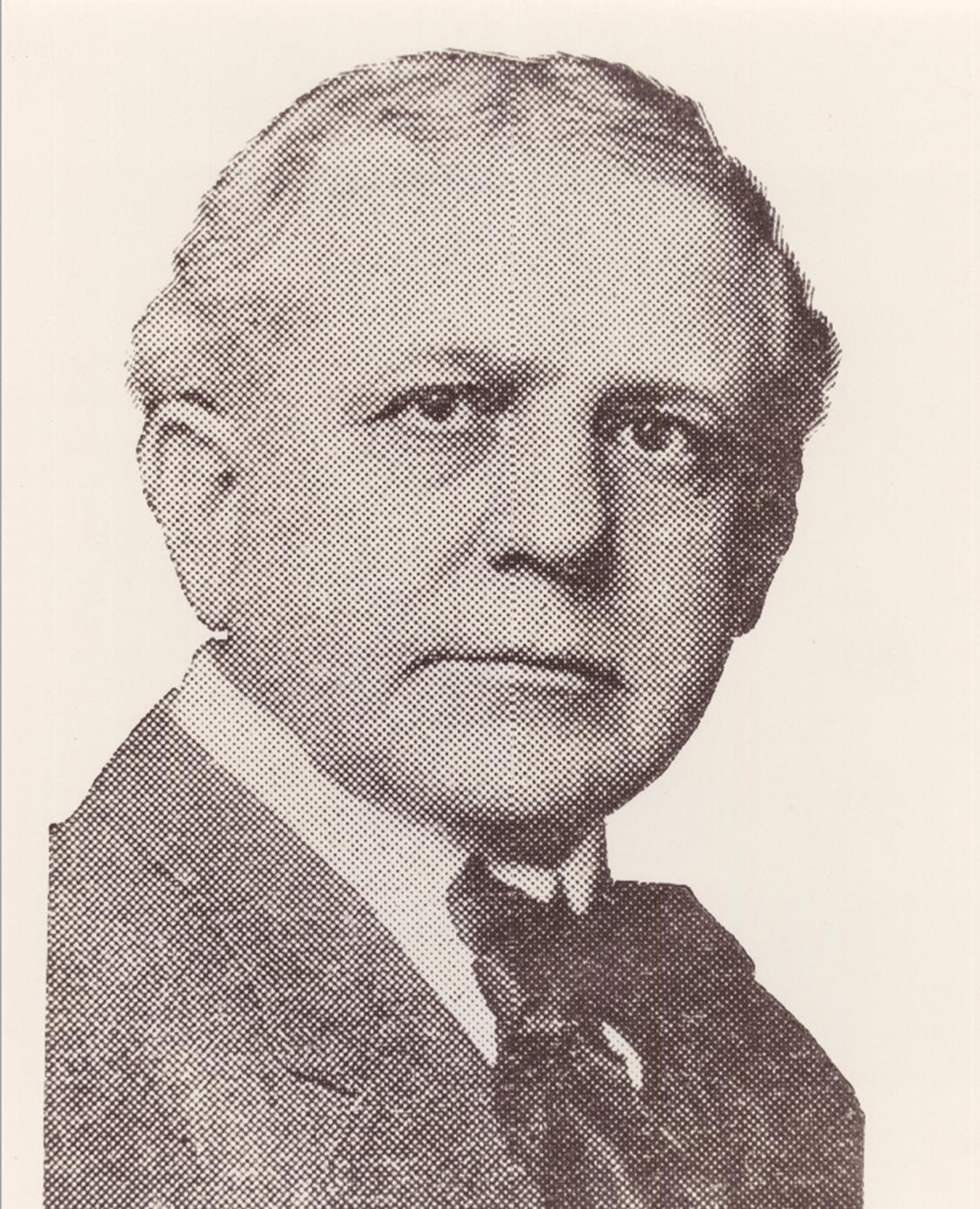
Nominee	John L. Bacon	James E. Wadham
Party	Republican	Democratic
Popular vote	8,302	8,220
Percentage	50.2%	49.8%
Mayor before election
Louis J. Wilde
Republican
Elected mayor
John L. Bacon
Republican

The 1921 San Diego mayoral election was held on April 5, 1921, to elect the mayor for San Diego. In the primary election, former mayor James E. Wadham and former City Councilmember John L. Bacon received the most votes and advanced to the runoff. Bacon was then elected mayor with a majority of the votes.

== Candidates ==
- John L. Bacon, former member of the San Diego City Council and Assistant City Manager
- James E. Wadham, former mayor of San Diego
- Frank H. Heskett, attorney
- Lewis R. Kirby
- Charles A. Allen
- Ludwig S. Gerlough
- William I. Kinsley
- Alfred L. Lee

== Campaign ==
Incumbent Mayor Louis J. Wilde declined to stand for reelection, calling the position of mayor a thankless job. The main three candidates to succeed Wilde were former mayor James E. Wadham, former City Councilmember John L. Bacon, and attorney Frank H. Heskett.

On March 22, 1921, Wadham received the highest number of votes in the primary election, followed by Bacon, allowing both men to advance to the runoff. Heskett, who came in third and was therefore eliminated, actively supported Wadham for the runoff. On April 5, 1921, Bacon narrowly defeated Wadham by 82 votes out of 16,522. Wadham appealed to the superior court for a recount, but this did not change the outcome. Bacon therefore assumed the office of the mayor.

== Primary Election results ==
San Diego mayoral primary election, 1921
Party	Candidate	Votes	%
Democratic	James E. Wadham	5,040	36.9
Republican	John L. Bacon	4,744	34.8
Nonpartisan	Frank H. Heskett	2,214	16.2
Nonpartisan	Lewis R. Kirby	896	6.6
Nonpartisan	Charles A. Allen	351	2.6
Nonpartisan	Ludwig S. Gerlough	310	2.3
Nonpartisan	William I. Kinsley	55	0.5
Nonpartisan	Alfred L. Lee	34	0.3
Total votes		13,644	100

== General Election results ==
San Diego mayoral general election, 1921
Party	Candidate	Votes	%
Republican	John L. Bacon	8,302	50.2
Democratic	James E. Wadham	8,220	49.8
Total votes		16,522	100
