= 1917 San Diego mayoral election =

- April 3, 1917
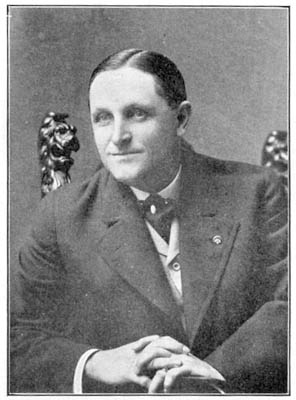

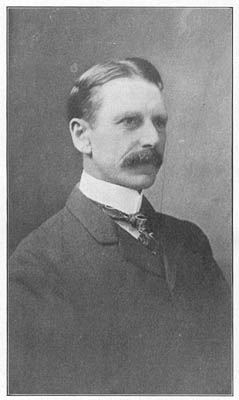
Nominee	Louis J. Wilde	George Marston
Party	Republican	Progressive
Popular vote	12,901	9,246
Percentage	58.3%	41.7%
Mayor before election
Edwin M. Capps
Democratic
Elected mayor
Louis J. Wilde
Republican

The 1917 San Diego mayoral election was held on April 3, 1917, to elect the mayor for San Diego. The election became known as the "Smokestacks vs. Geraniums" election because the dominant issue was whether the city's development should focus on planning and beautification or job creation and factories. In the primary election Louis J. Wilde, advocating for "smokestacks", and George Marston, derided as "Geranium George" by his opponents, received the most votes and advanced to the runoff. Wilde was then elected mayor with a majority of the votes.

== Candidates ==
- Louis J. Wilde, banker
- George Marston, department store owner and mayoral candidate in 1913
- Charles H. Bartholomew, retired postmaster

== Campaign ==
Incumbent Mayor Edwin M. Capps declined to run for re-election, leaving an open seat. The main challengers for the open seat were local department store owner and philanthropist George Marston, a Progressive, and banker Louis J. Wilde, a Republican. Also contesting the race was recently retired postmaster Charles Bartholomew.

Marston had previously run for mayor in 1913 advocating for planned expansion of the city and projects that would lead to a beautiful and prosperous city rather focusing on commerce and industry. In the intervening years, he had played a large role in shepherding through the Panama–California Exposition. In the 1917 campaign, Marston once again emphasized planned growth. In his campaign, he advocated for city planning, energy conservation, and building and pollution controls on industrial development. He also supported the growth of the military industry, chiefly the navy and the Marine Corps, since he did not consider this to be industrial growth. Marston's campaign also had the backing of influential city leaders such as John D. Spreckels, E.W. Scripps, and Albert Spalding.

In contrast to Marston, Wilde campaigned on a promise of increased industry in San Diego. He campaigned strongly for the labor vote, arguing that increased industry would lead to good jobs and good wages. Wilde billed himself as the "Smokestack Candidate" and labeled his opponent "Geranium George", giving the election its nickname. Wilde campaigned more aggressively than Marston, for example threatening that if Marston won the Salt Lake Railroad would never arrive in San Diego. Marston often refused to respond to these accusations.

On March 20, 1917, Wilde received the highest number of votes in the primary election, followed by Marston. In the April 3, 1917 runoff between the top-two candidates, Wilde received a majority and was elected mayor.

== Primary Election results ==
San Diego mayoral primary election, 1917
Party	Candidate	Votes	%
Republican	Louis J. Wilde	8,728	47.1
Progressive	George Marston	7,502	40.5
Republican	Charles H. Bartholomew	2,297	12.4
Total votes		18,528	100

== General Election results ==
San Diego mayoral general election, 1917
Party	Candidate	Votes	%
Republican	Louis J. Wilde	12,901	58.3
Progressive	George Marston	9,246	41.7
Total votes		22,147	100
