= 1931 San Diego mayoral election =

- April 7, 1931
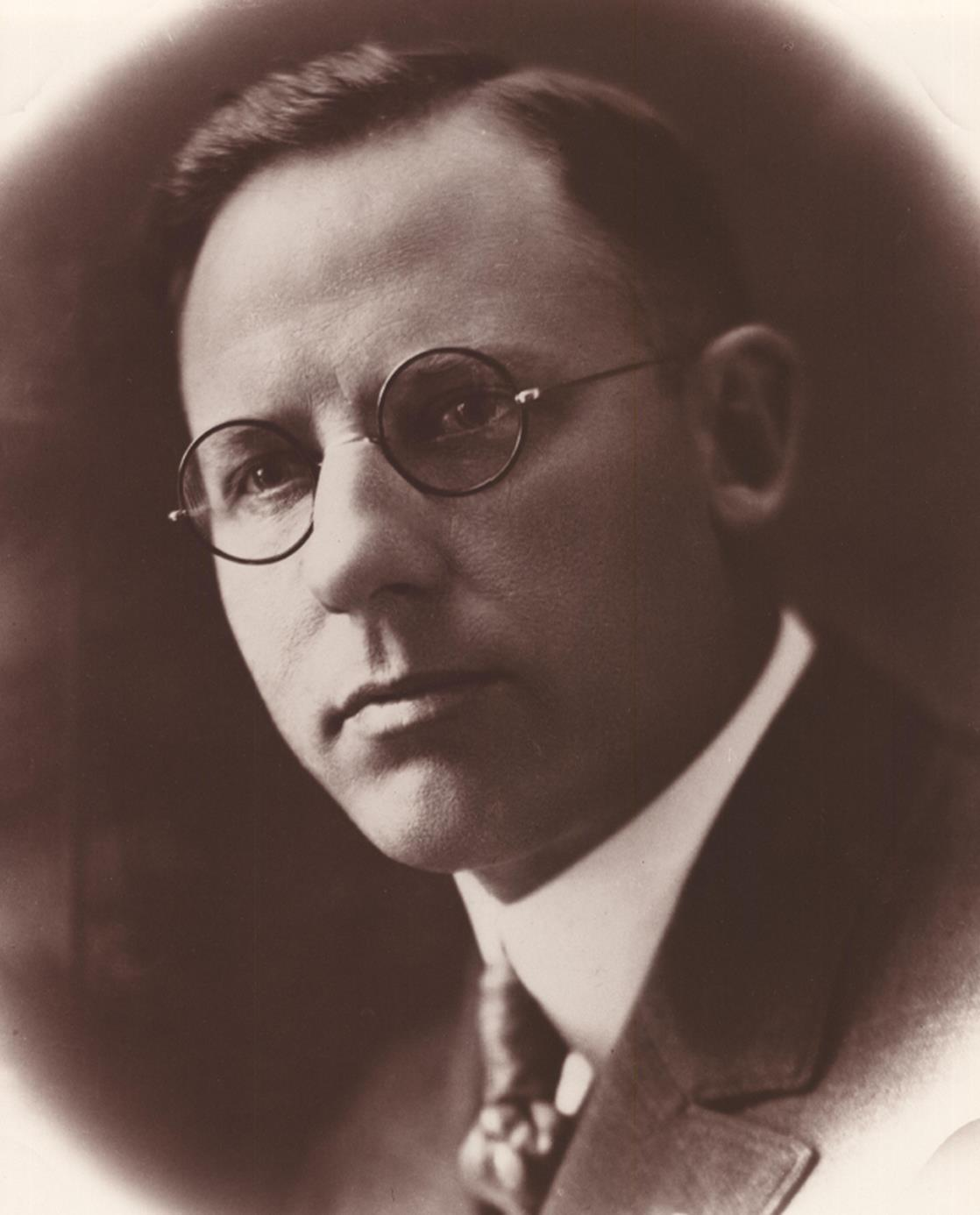

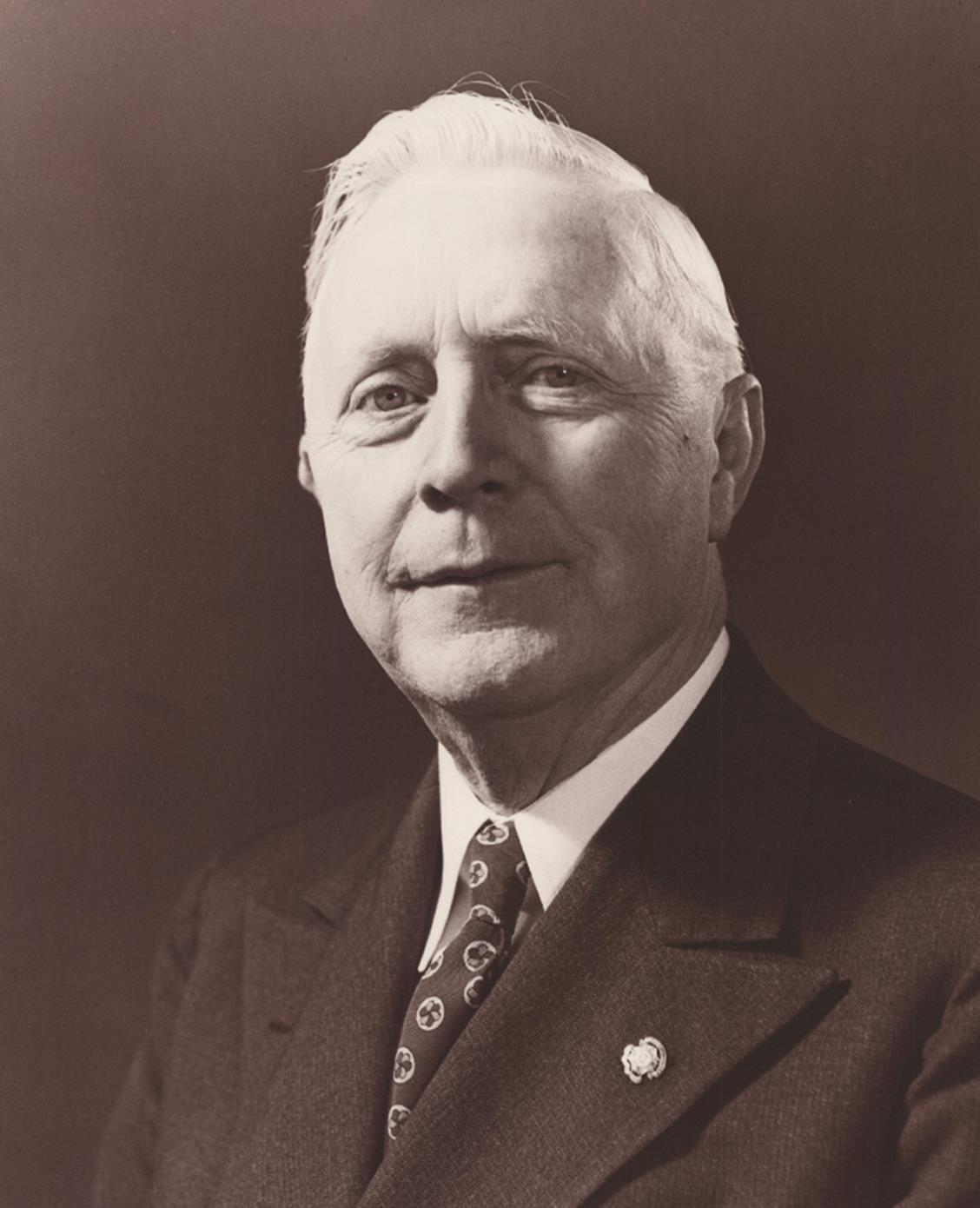
Nominee	Walter W. Austin	Harry C. Clark
Party	Republican	Republican
Popular vote	23,178	8,589
Percentage	73.0%	27.0%
Mayor before election
Harry C. Clark
Republican
Elected mayor
Walter W. Austin
Republican

The 1931 San Diego mayoral election was held on April 7, 1931 to elect the mayor for San Diego. Incumbent mayor Harry C. Clark stood for reelection to a third term. In the primary election, Clark and Walter W. Austin received the most votes and advanced to a runoff election. Austin was then elected mayor with a majority of the votes in the runoff.

== Candidates ==
- Walter W. Austin, businessman
- Harry C. Clark, mayor of San Diego
- George S. Parker
- David L. Rosco
- Bryant H. Howard
- Samuel Rose
- William I. Kinsley
- Flemmer Adams

== Campaign ==
Incumbent Mayor Harry C. Clark stood for reelection to a third term. During the campaign, opponents of Clark argued that there had been little progress on $8.6 million voters had approved for water projects in 1924 under Clark's tenure.

On March 24, 1931, Walter W. Austin came in first in the primary election with 43.5 percent of the votes, followed by Clark in second place with 22.4 percent. Since no candidate received a majority of the vote, Austin and Clark advanced to a runoff election. On April 7, 1931, Austin came in first place in the runoff election with 73 percent of the vote and was elected to the office of the mayor.

== Primary Election results ==
San Diego mayoral primary election, 1931
Party	Candidate	Votes	%
Republican	Walter W. Austin	11,167	43.5
Republican	Harry C. Clark (incumbent)	5,748	22.4
Nonpartisan	George S. Parker	5,449	21.2
Nonpartisan	David L. Rosco	2,470	9.6
Nonpartisan	Bryant H. Howard	439	1.7
Nonpartisan	Samuel Rose	216	0.8
Nonpartisan	William I. Kinsley	103	0.4
Nonpartisan	Flemmer Adams	95	—
Total votes		25,687	100

== General Election results ==
San Diego mayoral general election, 1931
Party	Candidate	Votes	%
Republican	Walter W. Austin	23,178	73.0
Republican	Harry C. Clark (incumbent)	8,589	27.0
Total votes		31,767	100
