= 1901 San Diego mayoral election =

- April 2, 1901
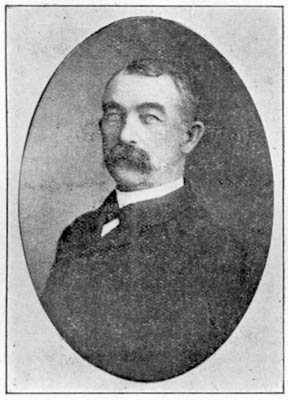

Nominee	Frank P. Frary	Patterson Sprigg
Party	Republican	Democratic
Popular vote	1,674	1,000
Percentage	59.1%	35.3%
Mayor before election
Edwin M. Capps
Democratic
Elected mayor
Frank P. Frary
Republican

The 1901 San Diego mayoral election was held on April 2, 1901, to elect the mayor for San Diego. Frank P. Frary was elected Mayor with a majority of the votes.

== Candidates ==
- Frank P. Frary
- Patterson Sprigg
- Frank Simpson

== Campaign ==
Incumbent Mayor Edwin M. Capps declined to run for re-election. Three candidates campaigned for the open seat: Frank P. Frary, a Republican, Patterson Sprigg, a Democrat and Frank Simpson, a Socialist.

On April 2, 1901, Frary was elected mayor with a majority of 59.1 percent of the vote. Sprigg came in second with 35.3 percent of the vote. Simpson came in third with 5.6 percent.

== Election results ==
San Diego mayoral election, 1901
Party	Candidate	Votes	%
Republican	Frank P. Frary	1,674	59.1
Democratic	Patterson Sprigg	1,000	35.3
Socialist	Frank Simpson	157	5.6
Total votes		2,831	100
