= 1967 San Diego mayoral election =

- November 7, 1967
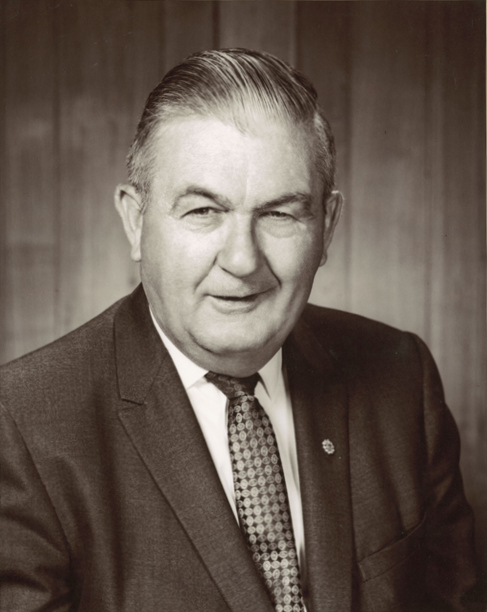

Nominee	Frank Curran	Allen Hitch
Party	Democratic	Republican
Popular vote	96,597	47,230
Percentage	67.2%	32.8%
Mayor before election
Frank Curran
Democratic
Elected mayor
Frank Curran
Democratic

The 1967 San Diego mayoral election was held on November 7, 1967, to elect the mayor for San Diego. Incumbent Mayor Frank Curran stood for reelection to a second term. In the primary election, Curran and Allen Hitch received the most votes and advanced to the runoff. Curran was then reelected mayor with a majority of the votes.

== Candidates ==
- Frank Curran, mayor of San Diego
- Allen Hitch, former member of the San Diego City Council and 1963 mayoral candidate
- John Clayton
- Gerard A. Dougherty
- George Stahlman
- Lloyd W. Gough
- Tom Kane

== Campaign ==
Incumbent Mayor Frank Curran stood for reelection to a second term. On September 19, 1963, Curran came in first in the primary election with 47.2 percent of the vote, followed by former City Councilmember Allen Hitch in second with 32.5 percent. Because no candidate received a majority of the vote, a runoff election was held between Curran and Hitch. On November 7, 1967, Curran easily defeated Hitch a majority of 67.2 percent of the vote in the runoff and was reelected to the office of the mayor.

== Primary Election results ==
San Diego mayoral primary election, 1967
Party	Candidate	Votes	%
Democratic	Frank Curran (incumbent)	52,355	47.2
Republican	Allen Hitch	36,060	32.5
Nonpartisan	John Clayton	11,299	10.2
Nonpartisan	Gerard A. Dougherty	5,202	4.7
Nonpartisan	George Stahlman	4,611	4.2
Nonpartisan	Lloyd W. Gough	793	0.7
Nonpartisan	Tom Kane	690	0.6
Total votes		111,010	100

== General Election results ==
San Diego mayoral general election, 1967
Party	Candidate	Votes	%
Democratic	Frank Curran (incumbent)	96,597	67.2
Republican	Allen Hitch	47,230	32.8
Total votes		143,827	100
