= 1971 San Diego mayoral election =

- November 2, 1971
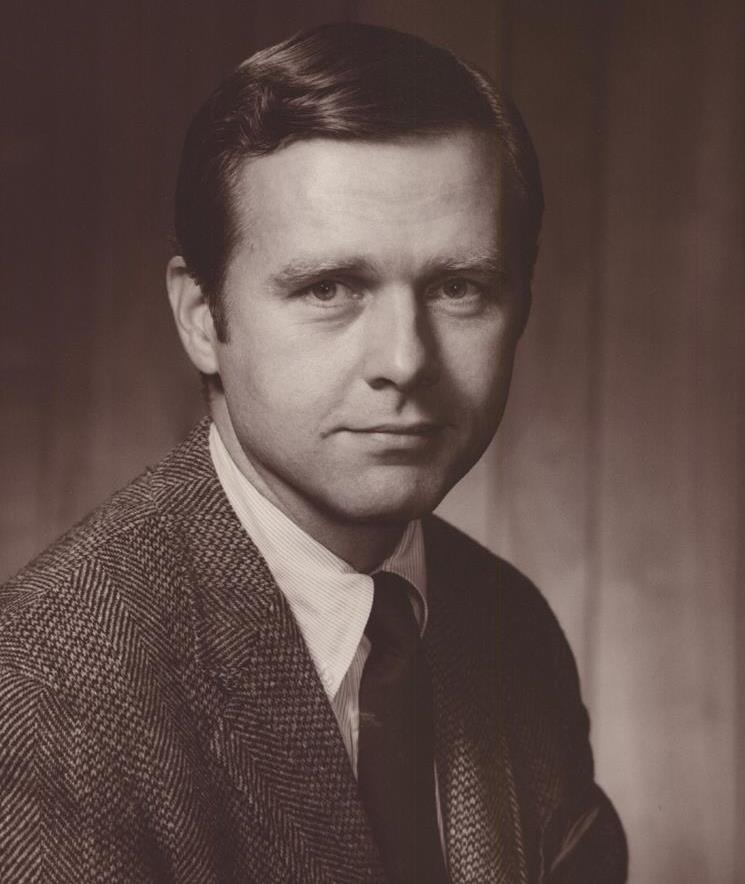

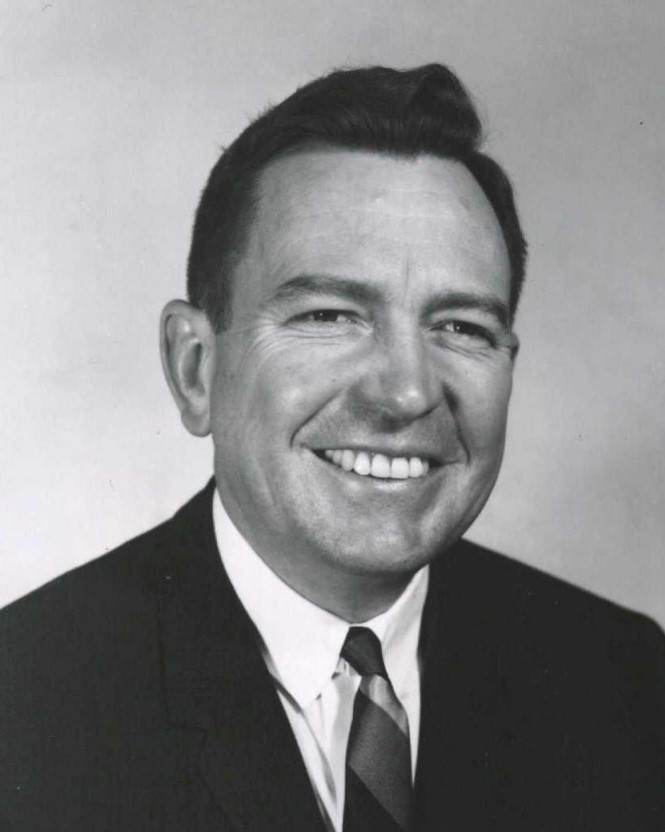
Nominee	Pete Wilson	Ed Butler
Party	Republican	Democratic
Popular vote	116,003	71,921
Percentage	61.7%	38.3%
Mayor before election
Frank Curran
Democratic
Elected mayor
Pete Wilson
Republican

The 1971 San Diego mayoral election was held on November 2, 1971, to elect the mayor for San Diego. Incumbent Frank Curran stood for reelection for a third term. California State Assembly member Pete Wilson and former San Diego City Attorney Ed Butler received the most votes in the primary and advanced to the runoff. Wilson was then elected mayor with a majority of the votes.

== Candidates ==
- Pete Wilson, member of the California State Assembly
- Ed Butler, former San Diego City Attorney
- Jack Walsh, member of the San Diego County Board of Supervisors
- Frank Curran, mayor of San Diego
- Dan Grady, consulting firm president
- Tom Hom, former member of the California State Assembly and the San Diego City Council
- Virginia Taylor, self-employed research analyst
- Gilbert Robledo, sociology and Chicano studies instructor
- Alan Littlemore, real estate agent
- Mike Schaefer, member of the San Diego City Council
- Arthur Mannion, county planner
- William McKinley, real estate broker
- Don Marsh, advertising director
- Kenny Olson, business owner

== Campaign ==
In October 1970, prior to the beginning of the campaign, incumbent Mayor Frank Curran and several other City officials were indicted for allegedly taking bribes from the Yellow Cab Company. He was acquitted on all charges prior to the election. Despite the controversy, Curran chose to run for reelection to a third term, hoping that reelection would serve as a public exoneration from his involvement in the case.

The 1971 election attracted a then-record 14 declared candidates. Five of Curran's challengers had previous experience in elected office, including California State Assembly member Pete Wilson, former San Diego City Attorney Ed Bulter, San Diego Board of Supervisors member Jack Walsh, former member of the Assembly and the San Diego City Council Tom Hom, and city council member Mike Schaefer. The remaining eight challengers were political outsiders running for their first elective office.

In the September 21, 1971 primary election, Wilson received more than twice as many votes his nearest competitor with 36.8 percent of the vote. Butler came in second place with 18.3 percent, followed by Walsh in third place with 16.2 percent of the vote, and Mayor Curran at 10.6 percent. None of the remaining ten candidates received more than five percent of the vote.

Because no candidate received a majority of the vote, the top two vote-getters, Wilson and Butler, advanced to the runoff election scheduled for November 2, 1971. Wilson was then elected mayor with a majority of 61.7 percent of the votes.

== Primary election results ==
San Diego mayoral primary election, 1971
Party	Candidate	Votes	%
Republican	Pete Wilson	57,940	36.8
Democratic	Ed Butler	28,870	18.3
Republican	Jack Walsh	25,546	16.2
Democratic	Frank Curran	16,743	10.6
Nonpartisan	Dan Grady	7,776	4.9
Republican	Tom Hom	7,106	4.5
Nonpartisan	Virginia Taylor	6,125	3.9
Nonpartisan	Gilbert Robledo	2,923	1.9
Nonpartisan	Alan Littlemore	1,584	1.0
Republican	Mike Schaefer	1,540	1.0
Nonpartisan	Arthur Mannion	425	0.3
Nonpartisan	William McKinley	373	0.2
Nonpartisan	Don Marsh	341	0.2
Nonpartisan	Kenny Olson	340	0.2
Total votes		157,632	100

== General election ==
San Diego mayoral general election, 1971
Party	Candidate	Votes	%
Republican	Pete Wilson	116,003	61.7
Democratic	Ed Butler	71,921	38.3
Total votes		187,924	100
