= 1929 San Diego mayoral election =

- March 19, 1929
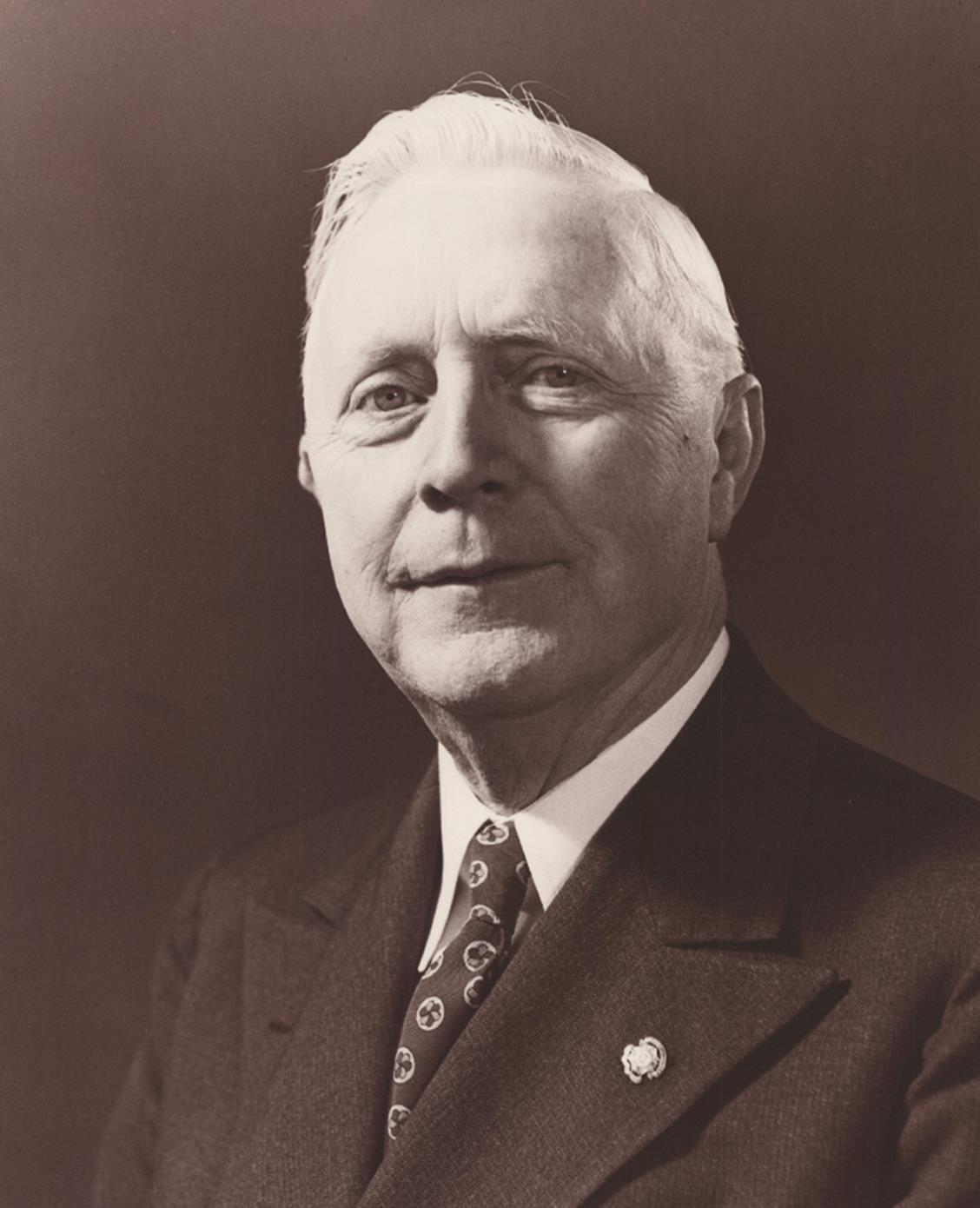

Nominee	Harry C. Clark	Patrick F. O'Rourke
Party	Republican	Nonpartisan
Popular vote	15,713	7,357
Percentage	58.9%	27.6%
Mayor before election
Harry C. Clark
Republican
Elected mayor
Harry C. Clark
Republican

The 1929 San Diego mayoral election was held on March 19, 1929, to elect the mayor for San Diego. Incumbent mayor Harry C. Clark stood for reelection to a second term. In the primary election, Clark received a majority of the votes and was elected outright with no need for a contested runoff.

== Candidates ==
- Harry C. Clark, mayor of San Diego
- Patrick F. O'Rourke
- Ozro D. Thomas
- Ella S. Robbins
- William I. Kinsley

== Campaign ==
Incumbent Mayor Harry C. Clark stood for reelection to a second term. On March 19, 1929, Clark received a majority of 58.9 percent of the vote in the primary election. This was more than 30 percent higher than what was received by Patrick O'Rourke, his nearest competitor. Clark received 99.8 percent of the vote in the uncontested runoff on April 2, 1929, and was elected to the office of the mayor.

== Primary Election results ==
San Diego mayoral primary election, 1929
Party	Candidate	Votes	%
Republican	Harry C. Clark (incumbent)	15,713	58.9
Nonpartisan	Patrick F. O'Rourke	7,357	27.6
Nonpartisan	Ozro D. Thomas	2,069	7.8
Nonpartisan	Ella S. Robbins	1,104	4.1
Nonpartisan	William I. Kinsley	445	1.7
Total votes		26,688	100

== General Election results ==
Because Clark won outright in the primary with a majority of the vote, his was the only eligible name on the runoff ballot.

San Diego mayoral general election, 1929
Party	Candidate	Votes	%
Republican	Harry C. Clark (incumbent)	23,328	99.8
Nonpartisan	scattered votes	50	0.2
Total votes		23,378	100
