= 1903 San Diego mayoral election =

- April 7, 1903
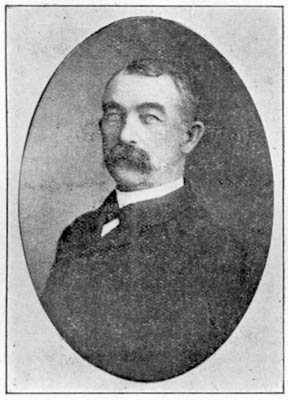

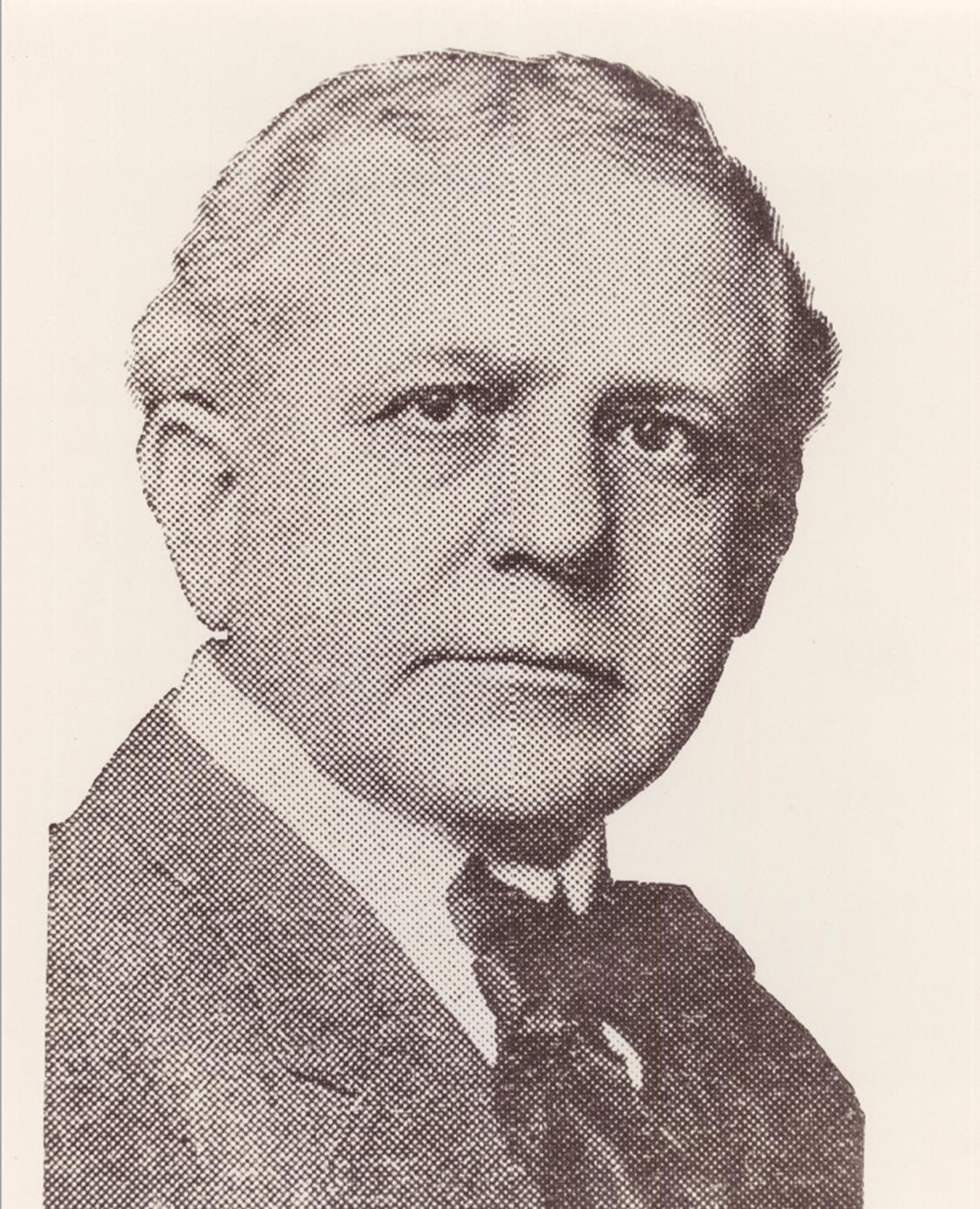
Nominee	Frank P. Frary	James E. Wadham
Party	Republican	Democratic
Popular vote	1,469	1,312
Percentage	49.0%	43.7%
Mayor before election
Frank P. Frary
Republican
Elected mayor
Frank P. Frary
Republican

The 1903 San Diego mayoral election was held on April 7, 1903, to elect the mayor for San Diego. Incumbent Mayor Frank P. Frary was reelected to a second term with a plurality of the votes.

== Candidates ==
- Frank P. Frary, mayor of San Diego
- James E. Wadham
- Frank Simpson

== Campaign ==
Incumbent Mayor Frank P. Frary, a Republican, stood for reelection to a second two-year term. His reelection was contested by James E. Wadham, a Democrat, and Frank Simpson, a Socialist. Wadham ran on a Democratic Party platform that advocated for public ownership of gas and electricity as well as the development of pueblo lands.

On April 7, 1903, Frary was reelected mayor with a plurality of 49.0 percent of the vote. Wadham came in second with 43.7 percent of the vote. This represented an 8.4 percent swing in the Democrat's favor compared to 1901, but was not enough to defeat Frary. Simpson came in third with 7.3 percent.

== Election results ==
San Diego mayoral election, 1903
Party	Candidate	Votes	%
Republican	Frank P. Frary (incumbent)	1,469	49.0
Democratic	James E. Wadham	1,312	43.7
Socialist	Frank Simpson	219	7.3
Total votes		3,000	100
