= 1915 San Diego mayoral election =

- April 6, 1915
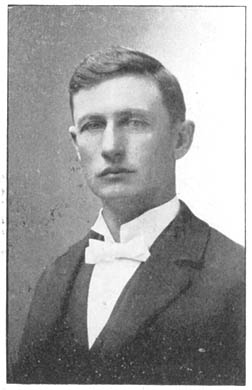

| Nominee | Edwin M. Capps | John Akerman |
| Party | Democratic | Republican |
| Popular vote | 10,733 | 8,284 |
| Percentage | 56.4% | 43.6% |
Mayor before election
Charles F. O'Neall
Republican
Elected mayor
Edwin M. Capps
Democratic

The 1915 San Diego mayoral election was held on April 6, 1915, to elect the mayor for San Diego. John Akerman and Edwin M. Capps received the most votes in the primary election and advanced to the runoff. Capps was then elected mayor with a majority of the votes.

== Candidates ==
- Charles F. O'Neall, mayor of San Diego
- Edwin M. Capps, previous mayor of San Diego
- John Akerman, lumber magnate
- Andrew Swanson
- Robert McNair

== Campaign ==
Incumbent Mayor Charles F. O'Neall stood for re-election as mayor. The main challengers to O'Neall were John Akerman, a Republican, and former mayor Edwin M. Capps, a Democrat. Also contesting the race were Andrew Swanson, a Socialist, and Robert McNair, an independent.

On March 23, 1915, Akerman received the highest number of votes in the primary election, followed by Capps. Akerman and Capps advanced to the general election, while Mayor O'Neall, who received little more than half the votes of the front-running Akerman, was eliminated from contention. On April 6, 1915, Capps received a majority of more than two thousand votes more than Akerman in the runoff and was elected mayor for a second, non-consecutive term.

== Primary Election results ==
San Diego mayoral primary election, 1915
| Party | Candidate | Votes | % |
|---|---|---|---|
| Republican | John Akerman | 6,512 | 42.0 |
| Democratic | Edwin M. Capps | 4,963 | 32.0 |
| Republican | Charles F. O'Neall | 3,563 | 23.0 |
| Socialist | Andrew Swanson | 408 | 2.6 |
| Independent | Robert McNair | 67 | 0.4 |
| Total votes | | 15,513 | 100 |

== General Election results ==
San Diego mayoral general election, 1915
| Party | Candidate | Votes | % |
|---|---|---|---|
| Democratic | Edwin M. Capps | 10,733 | 56.4 |
| Republican | John Akerman | 8,284 | 43.6 |
| Total votes | | 19,017 | 100 |
