= 1925 San Diego mayoral election =

- March 24, 1925
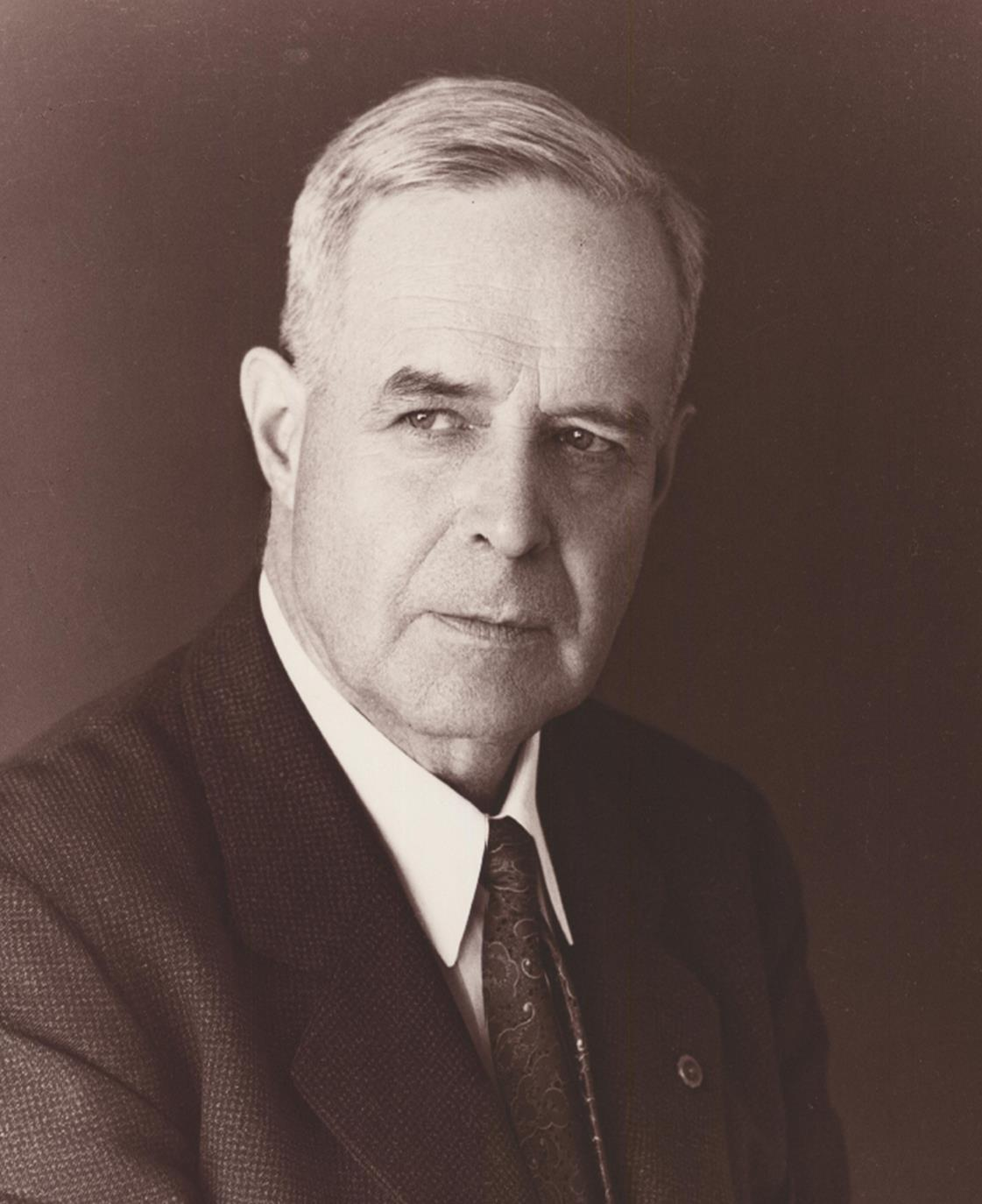

Nominee	John L. Bacon	Fred A. Heilbron
Party	Republican	Republican
Popular vote	11,653	6,056
Percentage	50.3%	26.1%
Mayor before election
John L. Bacon
Republican
Elected mayor
John L. Bacon
Republican

The 1925 San Diego mayoral election was held on March 24, 1925, to elect the mayor for San Diego. Incumbent mayor John L. Bacon stood for reelection to a third term. In the primary election, Bacon received a majority of the votes and was elected outright with no need for a contested runoff.

== Candidates ==
- John L. Bacon, mayor of San Diego
- Fred A. Heilbron, member of the San Diego City Council
- George L. Mayne
- Marcus W. Robbins
- William I. Kinsley

== Campaign ==
Incumbent Mayor John L. Bacon stood for reelection to a third term. On March 24, 1923, Bacon received an absolute majority of 50.3 percent in the primary election, more than 24 percent higher than his nearest competitor, Fred A. Heilbron. Bacon received one hundred percent of the vote in the uncontested runoff election held April 7, 1925 and was elected to the office of the mayor.

== Primary Election results ==
San Diego mayoral primary election, 1925
Party	Candidate	Votes	%
Republican	John L. Bacon (incumbent)	11,653	50.3
Republican	Fred A. Heilbron	6,056	26.1
Nonpartisan	George L. Mayne	4,901	21.1
Nonpartisan	Marcus W. Robbins	344	1.5
Nonpartisan	William L. Kinsley	235	1.0
Total votes		23,189	100

== General Election results ==
Because Bacon won outright in the primary with a majority of the vote, his was the only eligible name on the runoff ballot.

San Diego mayoral general election, 1925
Party	Candidate	Votes	%
Republican	John L. Bacon (incumbent)	18,801	100
Total votes		18,801	100
