= 1919 San Diego mayoral election =

- April 8, 1919
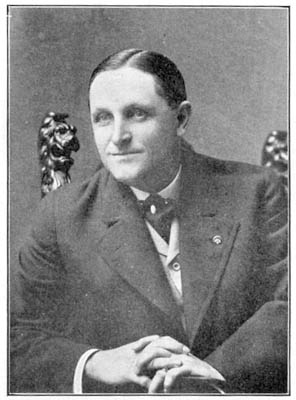

Nominee	Louis J. Wilde	A.P. Johnson Jr.
Party	Republican	Republican
Popular vote	9,724	9,246
Percentage	55.8%	44.2%
Mayor before election
Louis J. Wilde
Republican
Elected mayor
Louis J. Wilde
Republican

The 1919 San Diego mayoral election was held on April 8, 1919, to elect the mayor for San Diego in the U.S. state of California. In the primary election, incumbent Mayor Louis J. Wilde, and A.P. Johnson Jr. received the most votes and advanced to the runoff. Wilde was then reelected mayor with a majority of the votes.

== Candidates ==
- Louis J. Wilde, mayor of San Diego
- A.P. Johnson Jr., businessman and former member of the San Diego City Council
- Grant Conard, former mayor of San Diego
- Herbert Fay, former member of the San Diego City Council
- Johnn Gillons, merchant
- I. Isaac Irwin, banker

== Campaign ==
Incumbent Mayor Louis J. Wilde stood for reelection. Wilde was challenged for reelection by a number of experienced local politicians including former city council member A.P. Johnson Jr., former city council member Herbert Fay, and former mayor Grant Conard. Also contesting the race were local merchant John Gillons and banker I. Isaac Irwin.

In the campaign, Wilde was accused of being an ineffective mayor, attending less than half of the meetings of Council, and allowing immoral behavior to thrive in San Diego. Wilde contested the allegations claiming that he had been unable to enact his preferred policies due to resistance from the Common Council. Johnson, head of the Southern Title Guaranty Company, attempted to run a "smokestack" industrial development campaign similar to what had worked for Wilde in the 1917 election.

On March 25, 1919, Wilde received the highest number of votes in the primary election, followed by Johnson. In the April 8, 1919 runoff between Wilde and Johnson, Wilde received a majority was reelected mayor to a second term.

== Primary Election results ==
San Diego mayoral primary election, 1919
Party	Candidate	Votes	%
Republican	Louis J. Wilde (incumbent)	6,793	44.5
Republican	A.P. Johnson Jr.	4,139	27.1
Republican	Herbert Fay	1,369	9.0
Republican	Grant Conard	1,350	8.8
Nonpartisan	John Gillons	1,068	7.0
Democratic	I. Isaac Irwin	558	3.7
Total votes		15,271	100.0

== General Election results ==
San Diego mayoral general election, 1919
Party	Candidate	Votes	%
Republican	Louis J. Wilde (incumbent)	9,724	55.8
Republican	A.P. Johnson Jr.	7,688	44.2
Total votes		17,412	100.0
