= 1899 San Diego mayoral election =

- April 4, 1899
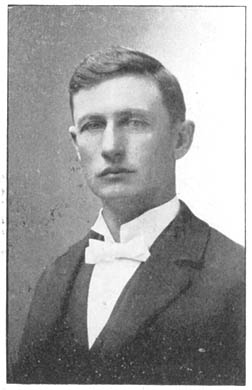

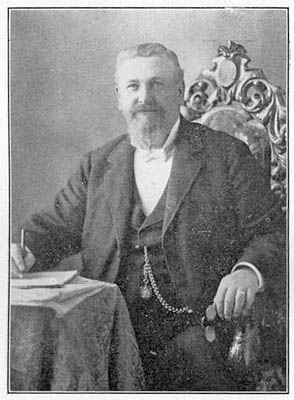
Nominee	Edwin M. Capps	Daniel C. Reed
Party	Democratic	Republican
Popular vote	1,714	1,493
Percentage	52.3%	45.6%
Mayor before election
Daniel C. Reed
Republican
Elected mayor
Edwin M. Capps
Democratic

The 1899 San Diego mayoral election was held on April 4, 1899, to elect the mayor for San Diego. Edwin M. Capps was elected Mayor with a majority of the votes.

== Candidates ==
- Edwin M. Capps, city engineer
- John Helphingstine
- Daniel C. Reed, mayor of San Diego

== Campaign ==
Incumbent Mayor Daniel C. Reed stood for re-election to a second two-year term as a Republican. His re-election was contested by Edwin M. Capps, a Democrat, and John Helphingstine of the Socialist Labor party.

One of the biggest issues during the campaign was municipal ownership of the water system. Capps, the city engineer, was seen as friendly to the San Diego Flume Company, while Reed was supported by the Southern California Mountain Water Company.

On April 4, 1899, Capps was elected mayor with a majority of 52.3 percent of the vote. Reed came in second with 45.6 percent of the vote. Helphingstine came in third with only 2.1 percent.

== Election results ==
San Diego mayoral election, 1899
Party	Candidate	Votes	%
Democratic	Edwin M. Capps	1,714	52.3
Republican	Daniel C. Reed (incumbent)	1,493	45.6
Socialist Labor	John Helphingstine	70	2.1
Total votes		3,277	100
