= 1923 San Diego mayoral election =

- March 20, 1923
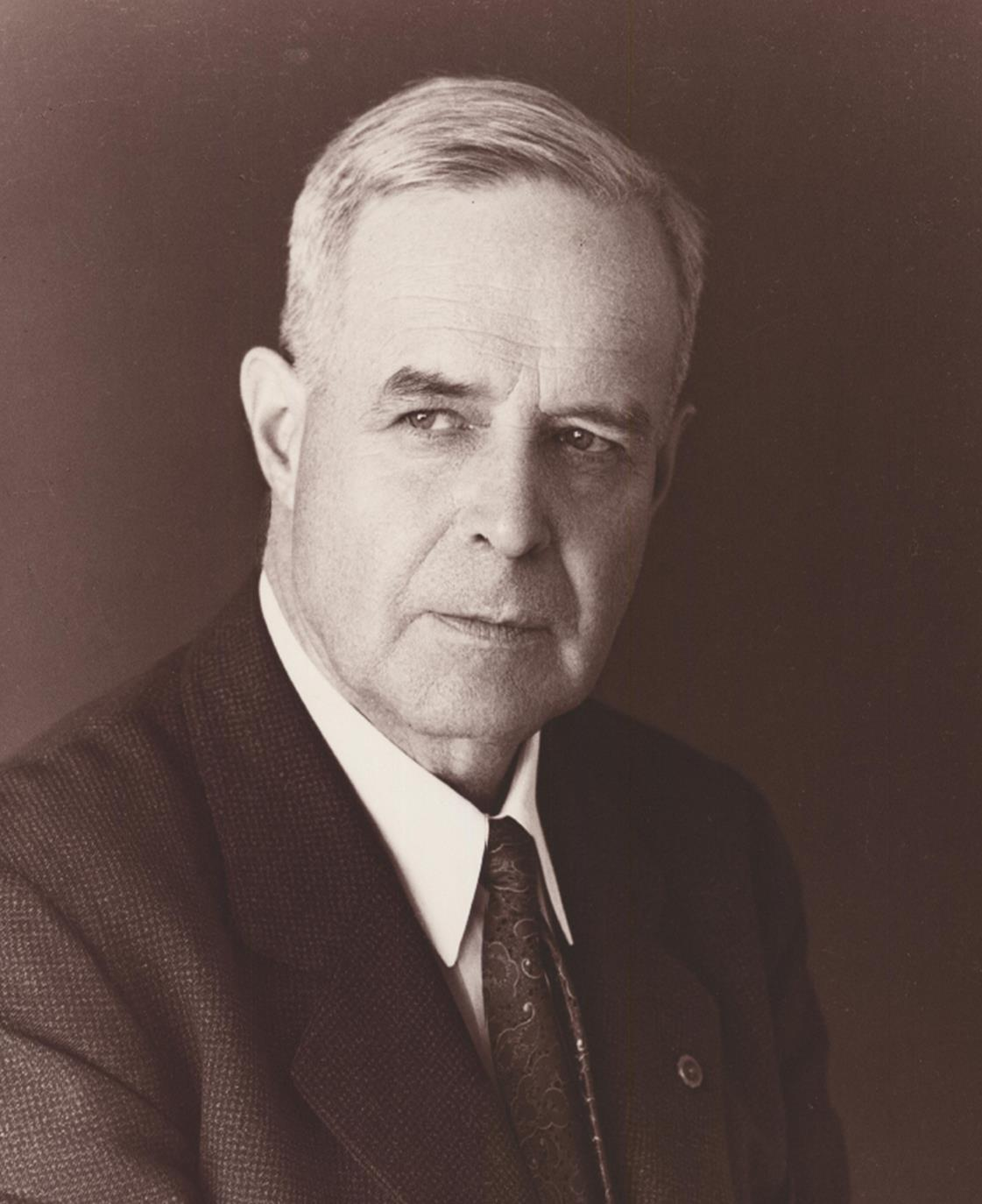

Nominee	John L. Bacon	Charles E. Rinehart
Party	Republican	Nonpartisan
Popular vote	9,848	5,935
Percentage	59.6%	35.9%
Mayor before election
John L. Bacon
Republican
Elected mayor
John L. Bacon
Republican

An election was held on March 20, 1923, to elect the mayor for San Diego. Incumbent mayor John L. Bacon stood for reelection. In the primary election, Bacon received a majority of the votes and was elected outright with no need for a contested runoff.

== Candidates ==
- John L. Bacon, mayor of San Diego
- Charles E. Rinehart
- Willis H.P. Shelton
- William I. Kinsley
- Oriel C. Jones

== Campaign ==
Incumbent Mayor John L. Bacon stood for reelection to a second term. On March 20, 1921, Bacon received an absolute majority of 59.6 percent in the primary election, more than 23 percent higher than his nearest competitor, Charles E. Rinehart. Bacon received one hundred percent of the vote in the uncontested runoff election held April 3, 1923 and was elected to the office of the mayor.

== Primary Election results ==
San Diego mayoral primary election, 1923
Party	Candidate	Votes	%
Republican	John L. Bacon (incumbent)	9,848	59.6
Nonpartisan	Charles E. Rinehart	5,935	35.9
Nonpartisan	Willis H.P. Shelton	580	3.5
Nonpartisan	William I. Kinsley	109	0.7
Nonpartisan	Oriel C. Jones	43	—
Total votes		13,644	100

== General Election results ==
Because Bacon won outright in the primary with a majority of the vote, his was the only eligible name on the runoff ballot.

San Diego mayoral general election, 1923
Party	Candidate	Votes	%
Republican	John L. Bacon (incumbent)	9,307	100
Total votes		9,307	100
