= 1975 San Diego mayoral election =

- September 16, 1975
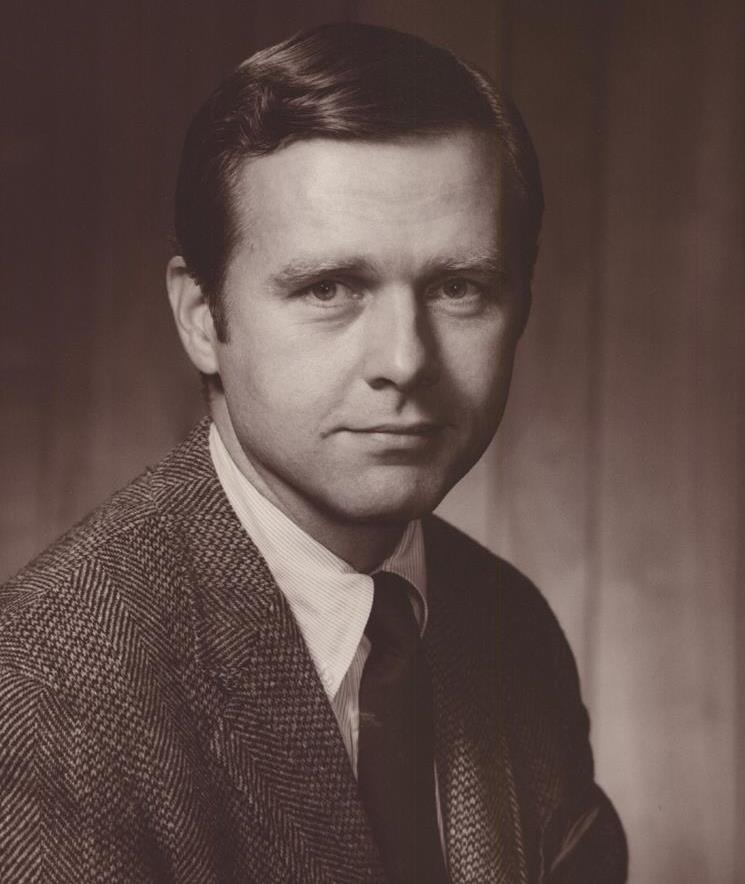

Nominee	Pete Wilson	Lee Hubbard
Party	Republican	Republican
Popular vote	91,069	46,965
Percentage	61.7%	31.9%
Mayor before election
Pete Wilson
Republican
Elected mayor
Pete Wilson
Republican

The 1975 San Diego mayoral election was held on September 16, 1975, to elect the mayor for San Diego. Incumbent Pete Wilson stood for reelection.

Municipal elections in California are officially non-partisan, though some candidates do receive funding and support from various political parties. The non-partisan primary was held September 16, 1975. Wilson received a majority of the votes in the primary and was reelected mayor with no need for a runoff election.

== Candidates ==
- Pete Wilson, mayor of San Diego
- Lee Hubbard, member of the San Diego City Council
- Otis Jones, lawyer
- John Kelley, writer and perennial candidate
- Kenny Olson, business owner and perennial candidate

== Campaign ==
Incumbent Mayor Pete Wilson stood for reelection to a second term. Similar to his 1971 campaign, Wilson campaigned on a platform of controlling growth and preventing Los Angeles–style sprawl. Other issues Wilson campaigned on included relocating the city airport from Lindbergh Field to Otay Mesa and opposing collective bargaining for public employees. Wilson's only opponent with prior experience in elected office was Council Member Lee Hubbard, owner of a concrete contracting firm. Hubbard stood as a more pro-growth candidate. He also opposed Wilson's support for relocating the airport and was in favor of limited labor rights for city employees.

In the September 16, 1975 primary election, Wilson was reelected mayor with 61.7 percent of the vote. Hubbard came in second with 31.9 percent of the vote. The remaining vote was split among three minor candidates. Because Wilson was elected outright in the primary, no runoff election was held.

== Primary election results ==
San Diego mayoral primary election, 1975
Party	Candidate	Votes	%
Republican	Pete Wilson (incumbent)	91,069	61.7
Republican	Lee Hubbard	46,965	31.9
Nonpartisan	Otis Jones	5,410	3.7
Nonpartisan	John Kelley	3,054	2.1
Nonpartisan	Kenny Olson	949	0.6
Total votes		147,447	100

== General election ==
Because Wilson was reelected mayor with a majority of the votes in the primary, no runoff election was held.
