= Joseph S. Manasse =

American politician (1831–1897)

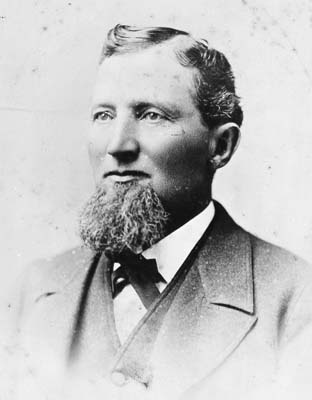
- Joseph S. Manasse

President of the San Diego Board of Trustees (informal Mayor)
- In office 1867–1869

Treasurer of San Diego
- In office 1865–1867
- Born: August 3, 1831; Filehne, Prussia
- Died: December 26, 1897 (aged 66)
- Occupations: Merchant, Businessman, Politician
- Years active: 1853–1897

Joseph S. Manasse (August 3, 1831 – December 26, 1897) was an early settler of San Diego, California.

Manasse was born in 1831 in Filehne, Prussia and came to San Diego in 1853 with his brother Heyman and cousin Moses. He opened a store in Old Town San Diego with little money, but soon prospered. In 1856, he formed a long-time partnership with Marcus Schiller, who was called a "Jewish Horatio Alger" by a biographer. They ran a large general store, J. S. Manasse and Company. They bought a lumberyard at the foot of E Street in 1868, and were the first to bring lumber ships into San Diego Bay. Soon afterward, they bought Rancho Los Encinitos, in present Encinitas, and raised cattle there. They also owned a 160-acre (0.65 km^{2}) farm. They built up a large business, but suffered severely in the drought, hard times, the early 1870s, and the great fire at Old Town in April 1872. They laid out and sold Manasse & Schiller's Addition, one of the earliest additions to Alonzo Horton's New San Diego. In later years, Manasse was a broker and collector.

Manasse, Schiller, and Louis Rose were among the first Jewish settlers in San Diego. Manasse would provide his Torah for early services. The congregation eventually organized as Congregation Beth Israel.

Manasse was a public-spirited citizen. During 1865–1867 he was Treasurer, and during 1867–1869 he was president of the San Diego's board of trustees, when San Diego didn't have a mayoral form of government. While on the board he voted for Ephraim Morse's proposal in 1868 to set aside a large tract of land for a public park, which eventually became Balboa Park. Manassee took little interest in park matters though, and in 1889 he proposed leasing 300 acres (1.2 km^{2}) of the park for "gardening purposes" (actually growing barley for his own profit), which was soundly rejected by the City Council.

On account of his small stature he was sometimes called in jest "Manasse Chico", or "Manasito". His friends called him "Joe".

Manasse married Hannah Schiller, a sister of his partner. They had one daughter, Cilita Manasse.

Manasse died in 1897 and is buried at Home of Peace Cemetery on Imperial Avenue. His wife and daughter were later buried next to him.

== See also ==
- Biography in History of San Diego (1907) by William Ellsworth Smythe
- "The Uneasy Alliance: Jewish-Anglo Relations in San Diego 1850–1860" by Henry Schwartz, The Journal of San Diego History 20:3 (Summer 1974)

Preceded by Andrew Cassidy	President of the San Diego Board of Trustees; 1867–1868	Succeeded by José Guadalupe Estudillo
