= 1963 San Diego mayoral election =

San Diego mayoral election, 1963
- November 5, 1963
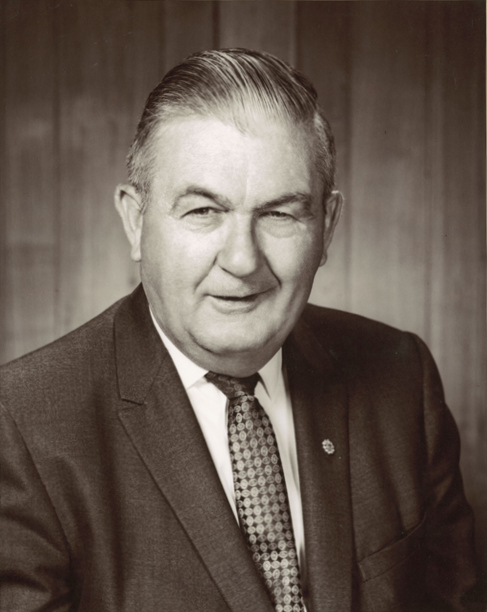

Nominee	Frank Curran	Murray D. Goodrich
Party	Democratic	Democratic
Popular vote	96,898	55,520
Percentage	63.6%	36.4%
Mayor before election
Charles Dail
Democratic
Elected mayor
Frank Curran
Democratic

The 1963 San Diego mayoral election was held on November 5, 1963, to elect the mayor for San Diego. Incumbent mayor Charles Dail did not stand for reelection. In the primary election, Frank Curran and Murray Goodrich received the most votes and advanced to the runoff. Curran was then elected mayor with a majority of the votes.

== Candidates ==
- Frank Curran, member of the San Diego City Council
- Murray D. Goodrich, businessman
- David S. Casey, attorney
- Allen Hitch, member of the San Diego City Council
- Helen R. Cobb, member of the San Diego City Council
- Donald J. Hartley
- Gerard A. Dougherty
- Joseph Costa
- Kenneth W. Olson
- William Matselboba Sr.
- John B. Schneider
- Juan Rivera Rosario

== Campaign ==
Incumbent Mayor Charles Dail did not stand for reelection due to failing health and declining power related to a recall attempt. The election drew a crowded field, including three members of the San Diego City Council: Frank Curran, Helen Cobb, and Alan Hitch. Other major contenders included David Casey, an attorney, and Murray Goodrich, a surplus aircraft parts dealer and aluminum smelter.

On September 17, 1963, Frank Curran came in first in the primary election with 22.4 percent of the vote, followed by Murray D. Goodrich in second with 21.0 percent, David S. Casey in third with 20.4 percent and Allen Hitch in fourth with 17.7 percent. None of the other remaining eight candidates received more than 10 percent of the vote. Because no candidate received a majority of the vote, a runoff election was held between the top two finishers, Curran and Goodrich. On November 5, 1963, Curran received a majority of 63.6 percent of the vote in the runoff and was elected to the office of mayor.

== Primary Election results ==
San Diego mayoral primary election, 1963
Party	Candidate	Votes	%
Democratic	Frank Curran	25,480	22.4
Democratic	Murray D. Goodrich	23,843	21.0
Nonpartisan	David S. Casey	23,178	20.4
Republican	Allen Hitch	20,145	17.7
Nonpartisan	Helen R. Cobb	7,662	6.7
Nonpartisan	Donald J. Hartley	5,216	4.6
Nonpartisan	Gerard A. Dougherty	3,841	3.4
Nonpartisan	Joseph Costa	1,832	1.6
Nonpartisan	Kenneth W. Olson	930	0.8
Nonpartisan	William Matselboba Sr.	564	0.5
Nonpartisan	John B. Schneider	520	0.5
Nonpartisan	Juan Rivera Rosario	412	0.4
Total votes		113,623	100

== General Election results ==
San Diego mayoral general election, 1963
Party	Candidate	Votes	%
Democratic	Frank Curran	96,898	63.6
Democratic	Murray D. Goodrich	55,520	36.4
Total votes		152,418	100
