= 2024 San Diego mayoral election =

- November 5, 2024
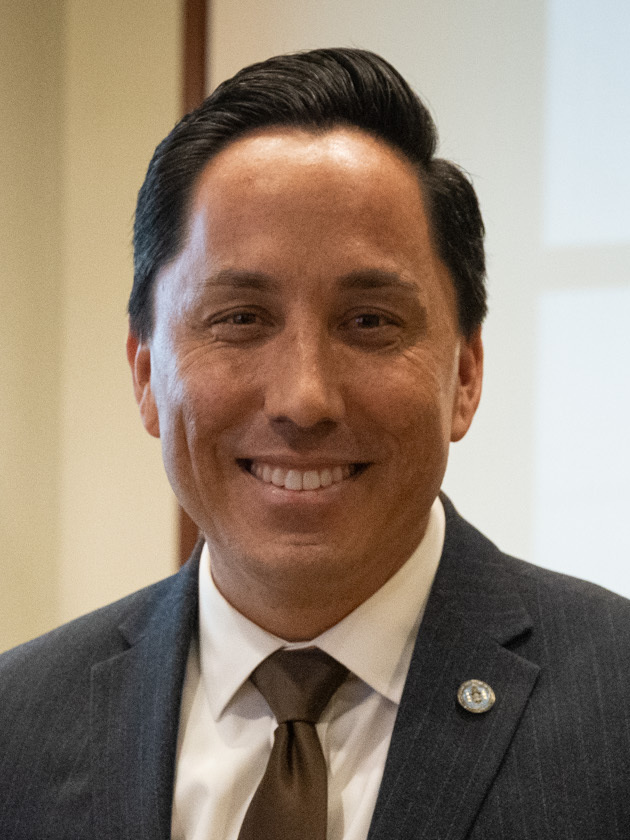

Candidate	Todd Gloria	Larry Turner
Popular vote	317,015	255,782
Percentage	55.35%	44.65%
Mayor before election
Todd Gloria
Democratic
Elected Mayor
Todd Gloria
Democratic

The 2024 San Diego mayoral election was held on Tuesday, November 5, 2024, to elect the mayor of San Diego, California. The primary election was held on Tuesday, March 5, 2024, after which incumbent mayor Todd Gloria and police officer Larry Turner advanced to the general election.

Municipal elections in California are officially non-partisan, although most members do identify a party preference. A two-round system is used for the elections, starting with primaries in March followed by runoff elections in November between the top-two candidates in each race.

== Candidates ==
=== Advanced to general election ===
- Todd Gloria, incumbent mayor (2020–present) (Party preference: Democratic)
- Larry Turner, police officer (Party preference: independent)

=== Eliminated in primary ===
- Jane Glasson
- Geneviéve Jones-Wright, lawyer (Party preference: Democratic)
- Daniel Smiechowski, real estate professional

=== Declined ===
- Scott Peters, U.S. Representative for California's 50th congressional district (ran for re-election)

== Endorsements ==
Todd Gloria

Local officials

- Nicole Murray-Ramirez, San Diego Human Rights Commissioner (2004–present) and honorary mayor for life of Hillcrest, San Diego

Labor unions

- San Diego & Imperial Counties AFL-CIO

Political parties

- San Diego County Democratic Party

Newspapers

- The San Diego Union-Tribune

Organizations

- Equality California
- LGBTQ Victory Fund
- San Diego Democrats for Equality
- San Diego County Young Democrats
Geneviéve Jones-Wright

Local officials

- Monica Montgomery Steppe, San Diego County supervisor
Larry Turner

Individuals

- Bill Walton, sportscaster and former NBA player

== Primary election ==
=== Lawsuit ===
In February 2024, San Diego resident Helen Michelle VanDiver filed a lawsuit alleging that candidate Larry Turner was not a resident or registered voter in the city prior to filing his nominating papers, claiming instead that he was primarily living in El Cajon. Turner denied the allegations, stating that he and his family have lived in East Village since early 2023. Judge James Mangione of the San Diego County Superior Court originally set the hearing date for March 23, after the primary election; however, after Turner advanced to a runoff with mayor Gloria, VanDiver's attorney announced they would drop the case following harassment sent her way, including an alleged attack on her son.

=== Results ===
2024 San Diego mayoral primary
Candidate	Votes	%
Todd Gloria (incumbent)	132,055	49.99
Larry Turner	60,931	23.07
Geneviéve Jones-Wright	42,196	15.97
Jane Glasson	18,990	7.19
Daniel Smiechowski	9,973	3.78
Total votes	264,145	100.00

== General election ==
=== Polling ===
Poll source	Date(s) administered	Sample size (Note: Key: A – all adults RV – registered voters LV – likely voters V – unclear)	Margin of error	Todd Gloria	Larry Turner	Undecided
SurveyUSA (Note: Poll sponsored by KGTV and The San Diego Union-Tribune)	October 18–21, 2024	530 (LV)	± 4.8%	47%	31%	22% (Note: "Will not cast a ballot" with 3%)
SurveyUSA	September 11–15, 2024	581 (LV)	± 4.9%	37%	33%	30%
Competitive Edge Research	May 6–15, 2024	413 (RV)	–	40%	32%	28%

Hypothetical polling

Todd Gloria vs. Scott Peters

Poll source	Date(s) administered	Sample size	Margin of error	Todd Gloria	Scott Peters	Undecided
New Bridge Strategy	January 2023	– (RV)	–	44%	50%	4%

Todd Gloria vs. generic opponent

Poll source	Date(s) administered	Sample size	Margin of error	Todd Gloria	Generic opponent	Undecided
New Bridge Strategy	January 2023	– (RV)	–	39%	54%	7%

=== Results ===
2024 San Diego mayoral election
Candidate	Votes	%
Todd Gloria (incumbent)	317,015	55.35
Larry Turner	255,782	44.65
Total votes	572,797	100.00

== See also ==
- 2024 San Diego City Council election

== Notes ==
Partisan clients
