= 1959 San Diego mayoral election =

- March 10, 1959
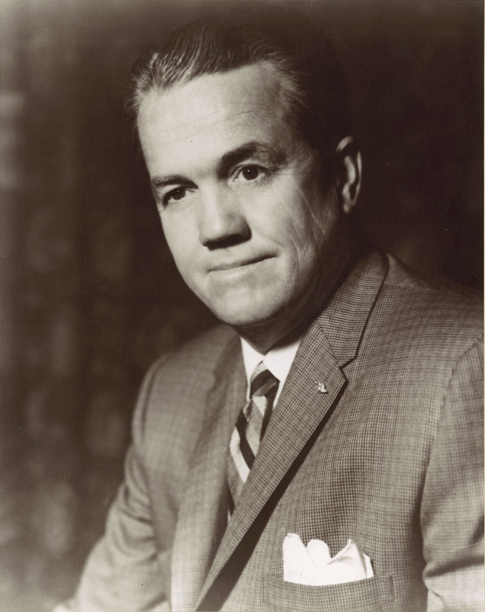

Nominee	Charles Dail	James W. Morgan
Party	Democratic	Nonpartisan
Popular vote	43,544	12,314
Percentage	63.4%	17.9%
Mayor before election
Charles Dail
Democratic
Elected mayor
Charles Dail
Democratic

The 1959 San Diego mayoral election was held on March 10, 1959, to elect the mayor for San Diego, California, United States. The incumbent mayor, Charles Dail, stood for reelection to a second term. In the primary election, Dail received a majority of the votes and was elected mayor outright with no need for a run-off.

== Candidates ==
- Charles Dail
- James W. Morgan
- Gerard A. Dougherty
- Robert Lewis Stevenson
- Kent Parker
- Juan Rivera Rosario

== Campaign ==
Dail stood for re-election to a second term. On March 10, 1959, he came first in the primary election with 63.4 percent of the vote, more than 45 percent higher than James W. Morgan, his nearest competitor. Because Dail received a majority of the vote, there was no need for a run-off election, and he was consequently re-elected to the office of the mayor.

== Primary election results ==
San Diego mayoral primary election, 1959
Party	Candidate	Votes	%
Democratic	Charles Dail (incumbent)	43,544	63.4
Nonpartisan	James W. Morgan	12,314	17.9
Nonpartisan	Gerard A. Dougherty	4,935	7.2
Nonpartisan	Robert L. Stevenson	3,553	5.2
Nonpartisan	Kent Parker	2,873	4.2
Nonpartisan	Juan Rivera Rosario	1,422	2.1
Total votes		68,641	100

== General election results ==
Because Dail received a majority of the vote in the primary, no run-off election was held.
