= Mayor of San Diego =

Head of the executive branch of the San Diego city government

Mayor of the City of San Diego
- Seal of San Diego

- Flag of San Diego

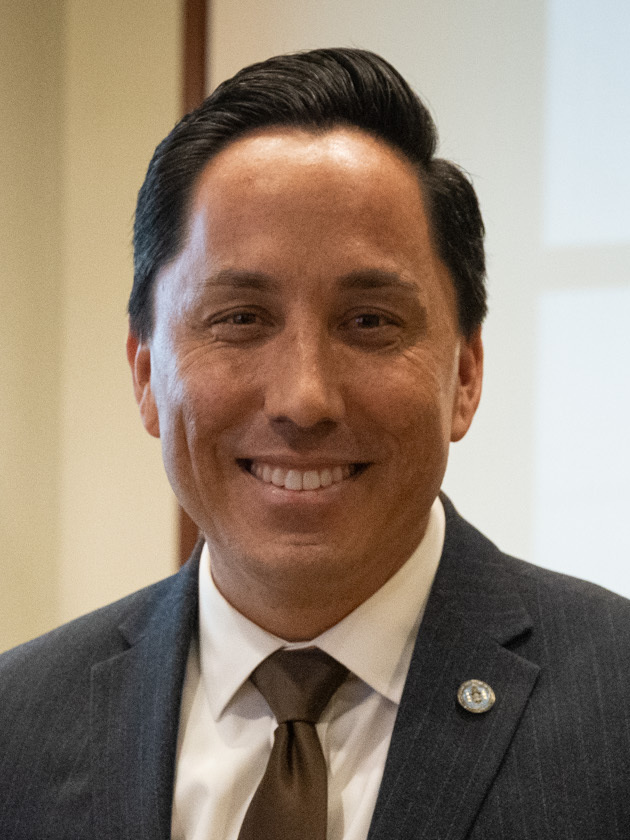
- Incumbent; Todd Gloria since December 10, 2020
- Term length: Four years, renewable once
- Inaugural holder: Joshua Bean
- Formation: 1850
- Salary: $206,000 annually
- Website: Office of the Mayor

The mayor of the City of San Diego is the official head and chief executive officer of the U.S. city of San Diego, California. The mayor has the duty to enforce and execute the laws enacted by the San Diego City Council, the legislative branch. The mayor serves a four-year term and is limited to two successive terms.

There have been 36 people who have served as mayor in San Diego since 1850, when California became a state following the Conquest of California. Prior to the conquest, Californios served as mayor of San Diego during the Spanish and Mexican eras since 1780. From 1852 to 1888, the city was run by a board of trustees and there was no elected mayor. However, the president of the board was called mayor as a courtesy.

The most recent election was held in November 2024, and Todd Gloria was re-elected as the 37th mayor of San Diego.

== History ==
The position of mayor was created when San Diego was first incorporated on March 27, 1850. However, the city went bankrupt in 1852, only two years after incorporation. As a result of the bankruptcy, the State of California dissolved the government and replaced the mayor and city council with a board of trustees. The mayoral position was later re-established with a new charter in 1887. This charter was replaced with a permanent City Charter on May 6, 1889, using the strong mayor form of government.

In 1931, a new charter was adopted using a council–manager government with a citywide mayor as leader of the city council.

In November 2004, voters approved Proposition F, returning San Diego to the strong mayor form of government on a five-year trial basis. This was made permanent in June 2010 with the passage of Proposition D.

=== Scandals ===
Then-mayor Roger Hedgecock was forced to resign his post in 1985, after he was found guilty of one count of conspiracy and 12 counts of perjury, related to the alleged failure to report all campaign contributions. After a series of appeals, the 12 perjury counts were dismissed in 1990 based on claims of juror misconduct; the remaining conspiracy count was reduced to a misdemeanor and then dismissed.

A 2002 scheme to underfund pensions for city employees led to the San Diego pension scandal. This resulted in the resignation of newly re-elected Mayor Dick Murphy and the criminal indictment of six pension board members. Those charges were dismissed by a federal judge in 2010.

In 2005, two city council members, Ralph Inzunza and Deputy Mayor Michael Zucchet – who briefly took over as acting mayor when Murphy resigned – were convicted of extortion, wire fraud, and conspiracy to commit wire fraud for taking campaign contributions from a strip club owner and his associates, allegedly in exchange for trying to repeal the city's "no touch" laws at strip clubs. Both subsequently resigned. Inzunza was sentenced to 21 months in prison. In 2009, a judge acquitted Zucchet on seven out of the nine counts against him, and granted his petition for a new trial on the other two charges; the remaining charges were eventually dropped.

In July 2013, three former supporters of Mayor Bob Filner asked him to resign because of allegations of repeated sexual harassment. Over the ensuing six weeks, 18 women came forward to publicly claim that Filner had sexually harassed them, and multiple individuals and groups called for him to resign. Filner agreed to resign effective August 30, 2013, subsequently pleaded guilty to one felony count of false imprisonment and two misdemeanor battery charges, and was sentenced to house arrest and probation.

In 2016, Mayor Kevin Faulconer entered into a lease-to-own agreement for San Diego's new City Hall at 101 Ash St. The building is uninhabitable with Asbestos and other issues. 101 Ash has become synonymous in San Diego with political scandals and bad real estate deals. The city overpaid for the property by $30M. It then botched renovations and eventually discovered its own real estate broker had also been working for the building's seller.

== Duties and powers ==
The mayor serves as the official head of the City of San Diego for all ceremonial and civil purposes. The mayor has the authority to approve or veto council actions, subject to a two-thirds vote veto overrule. Under the strong mayor system, the mayor has sole authority to appoint and dismiss the city manager and to direct and control the city manager as permitted by the city charter. The mayor also has the authority to dismiss the chief of police or the chief of the fire department subject to a council overrule. The mayor may recommend measures and ordinance to the city council, but may not vote on these items.

On or before January 15, the mayor is obligated to communicate a State of the City address to the city council. The mayor must also propose a budget to the city council and for public review no later than April 15.

The salary of the mayor was set at $100,464 in 2003. In March 2012, the city's Salary Setting Commission proposed that the mayor be paid $235,000, but the city council unanimously rejected the recommendation, instead keeping the salary at the 2003 level. In March 2014, the Salary Setting Commission recommended no pay increase for the mayor or city council. Instead, they recommended exploring future pay increases with additional condition that council members voting for pay increases not be allowed to benefit from the increase. This recommendation was approved by the city council in a 5–3 vote in favor of the changes. In November 2018, voters passed Measure L which ties future mayoral salaries to those of Superior Court judges. As of December 2020, the mayoral salary is $206,000.

== Election and succession ==
The mayor is elected in citywide election. Elections follow a two-round system. The first round of the election is called the primary election. The top-two candidates from the primary election advance to a runoff election, called the general election. Write-in candidates are only allowed to contest the primary election and are not allowed in the general election. The mayor is elected to a four-year term, with a limit of two consecutive terms. The mayor is officially non-partisan by state law, although most mayoral candidates identify a party preference.

If the office of the mayor becomes vacant with one year or less remaining in the term, the city council appoints a person to fill the vacancy. If the vacancy occurs with more than one year remaining, the city council is obligated to call a special election. The candidate with the majority of the votes in the special election is declared mayor. If no candidate receives a majority, a special run-off must be held between the two candidates with the highest number of votes. While the mayor's office is vacant pending a special election, the president of the city council serves as the interim mayor, with limited powers, until a new mayor is elected. If for any reason a mayor serves a partial term of two years or more, it will count as one full term.

The most recent election was held in November 2024. Todd Gloria was re-elected as the 37th mayor of San Diego, defeating police officer Larry Turner. Gloria had previously served as interim mayor in his role as city council president following the 2013 resignation of Bob Filner.

== List ==
As of November 2026, 36 individuals have served as mayor. There have been 37 mayoralties because Edwin M. Capps served non-consecutive terms; he is counted chronologically as both the ninth and sixteenth mayor. The longest term was that of Pete Wilson, who served for eleven years over three terms prior to the establishment of successive term limits. The shortest term, not counting interim or acting mayors, was that of George P. Tebbetts, who served for less than two months before the position of mayor was abolished due to the bankruptcy of the city. Percy J. Benbough is the only mayor to have died in office. Two women have been elected mayor: Maureen O'Connor and Susan Golding consecutively. John F. Forward Sr. and John F. Forward Jr. are the only father and son to have both served as mayor. Todd Gloria is the first mayor of color, with Filipino, Latino, and Native American heritage. Gloria is also the first elected mayor to be openly gay.

This list includes people who served as acting mayor or interim mayor due to a vacancy in the office of the mayor, but who were not officially elected or appointed as mayor. The acting and interim mayors are not included in the count of mayoralties.

No.	Mayor	Term in office Elections		Party^{[a]}
1	Joshua Bean; 1818–1852 (aged 33–34)	June 17, 1850	January 14, 1851	Independent
1	Joshua Bean; 1818–1852 (aged 33–34)	1850		Independent
2	David B. Kurtz; 1819–1898 (aged 78–79)	January 14, 1851	January 10, 1852	Whig
2	David B. Kurtz; 1819–1898 (aged 78–79)	1851		Whig
3	George P. Tebbetts; 1828–1909 (aged 80–81)	January 10, 1852	February 28, 1852	Independent
3	George P. Tebbetts; 1828–1909 (aged 80–81)	1852		Independent
Office abolished (1852–1888)^{[b]}
4	William Jefferson Hunsaker; 1855–1933 (aged 77)	January 3, 1888	November 13, 1888	Workingmen's
4	William Jefferson Hunsaker; 1855–1933 (aged 77)	1887^{[c]}		Workingmen's
—	Martin D. Hamilton; 1855–1922 (aged 66–67)	November 13, 1888	May 6, 1889	Republican^{[d]}
—	Martin D. Hamilton; 1855–1922 (aged 66–67)	N/A^{[c]}		Republican^{[d]}
5	Douglas Gunn; 1841–1891 (aged 50)	May 6, 1889	May 4, 1891	Republican^{[d]}
5	Douglas Gunn; 1841–1891 (aged 50)	1889		Republican^{[d]}
6	Matthew Sherman; 1827–1898 (aged 70)	May 4, 1891	May 1, 1893	Republican
6	Matthew Sherman; 1827–1898 (aged 70)	1891		Republican
7	William H. Carlson; 1864–1937 (aged 73)	May 1, 1893	May 3, 1897	Independent
7	William H. Carlson; 1864–1937 (aged 73)	1893, 1895		Independent
8	David C. Reed; 1847–1928 (aged 81)	May 3, 1897	May 1, 1899	Republican
8	David C. Reed; 1847–1928 (aged 81)	1897		Republican
9	Edwin M. Capps; 1860–1938 (aged 77)	May 1, 1899	May 6, 1901	Democratic
9	Edwin M. Capps; 1860–1938 (aged 77)	1899		Democratic
10	Frank P. Frary; 1856–1911 (aged 54)	May 6, 1901	May 1, 1905	Republican
10	Frank P. Frary; 1856–1911 (aged 54)	1901, 1903		Republican
11	John L. Sehon; 1862–1913 (aged 50)	May 1, 1905	May 6, 1907	Democratic
11	John L. Sehon; 1862–1913 (aged 50)	1905		Democratic
12	John F. Forward Sr. 1851–1926 (aged 75)	May 6, 1907	May 3, 1909	Republican
12	John F. Forward Sr. 1851–1926 (aged 75)	1907		Republican
13	Grant Conard; 1867–1919 (aged 52)	May 3, 1909	May 1, 1911	Republican
13	Grant Conard; 1867–1919 (aged 52)	1909		Republican
14	James E. Wadham; 1865–1930 (aged 64–65)	May 1, 1911	May 5, 1913	Democratic
14	James E. Wadham; 1865–1930 (aged 64–65)	1911		Democratic
15	Charles F. O'Neall; 1875–1929 (aged 53)	May 5, 1913	May 3, 1915	Democratic
15	Charles F. O'Neall; 1875–1929 (aged 53)	1913		Democratic
16	Edwin M. Capps; 1860–1938 (aged 77)	May 3, 1915	May 7, 1917	Democratic
16	Edwin M. Capps; 1860–1938 (aged 77)	1915		Democratic
17	Louis J. Wilde; 1865–1924 (aged 58)	May 7, 1917	May 2, 1921	Republican
17	Louis J. Wilde; 1865–1924 (aged 58)	1917, 1919		Republican
18	John L. Bacon; 1878–1961 (aged 82)	May 2, 1921	May 2, 1927	Republican
18	John L. Bacon; 1878–1961 (aged 82)	1921, 1923, 1925		Republican
19	Harry C. Clark; 1883–1950 (aged 67)	May 2, 1927	May 4, 1931	Republican
19	Harry C. Clark; 1883–1950 (aged 67)	1927, 1929		Republican
20	Walter W. Austin; 1880–1951 (aged 70)	May 4, 1931	May 2, 1932	Republican
20	Walter W. Austin; 1880–1951 (aged 70)	1931		Republican
21	John F. Forward Jr. 1876–1938 (aged 61)	May 2, 1932	August 2, 1934	Republican
21	John F. Forward Jr. 1876–1938 (aged 61)	1932^{[e]}		Republican
22	Rutherford B. Irones; 1877–1948 (aged 70)	August 2, 1934	February 1, 1935	Republican
22	Rutherford B. Irones; 1877–1948 (aged 70)	N/A^{[e]}		Republican
—	Albert W. Bennett	February 1, 1935	May 6, 1935	Republican
—	Albert W. Bennett	N/A^{[e]}		Republican
23	Percy J. Benbough; 1884–1942 (aged 58)	May 6, 1935	November 4, 1942	Republican
23	Percy J. Benbough; 1884–1942 (aged 58)	1935, 1939^{[f]}		Republican
—	Fred W. Simpson	November 4, 1942	November 30, 1942	Republican
—	Fred W. Simpson	N/A^{[f]}		Republican
24	Howard B. Bard; 1870–1954 (aged 83)	November 30, 1942	May 3, 1943	Democratic
24	Howard B. Bard; 1870–1954 (aged 83)	N/A^{[f]}		Democratic
25	Harley E. Knox; 1899–1956 (aged 57)	May 3, 1943	May 7, 1951	Independent
25	Harley E. Knox; 1899–1956 (aged 57)	1943, 1947		Independent
26	John D. Butler; 1915–2010 (aged 94)	May 7, 1951	May 2, 1955	Republican
26	John D. Butler; 1915–2010 (aged 94)	1951		Republican
27	Charles Dail; 1909–1968 (aged 59)	May 2, 1955	December 2, 1963	Democratic
27	Charles Dail; 1909–1968 (aged 59)	1955, 1959		Democratic
28	Frank Curran; 1912–1992 (aged 79)	December 2, 1963	December 6, 1971	Democratic
28	Frank Curran; 1912–1992 (aged 79)	1963, 1967		Democratic
29	Pete Wilson; Born 1933 (93 years old)	December 6, 1971	January 3, 1983	Republican
29	Pete Wilson; Born 1933 (93 years old)	1971, 1975, 1979^{[g]}		Republican
—	Bill Cleator; 1927–1993 (aged 65)	January 3, 1983	May 3, 1983	Republican
—	Bill Cleator; 1927–1993 (aged 65)	N/A^{[g]}		Republican
30	Roger Hedgecock; Born 1946 (80 years old)	May 3, 1983	December 5, 1985	Republican
30	Roger Hedgecock; Born 1946 (80 years old)	1983, 1984^{[h]}		Republican
—	Ed Struiksma; Born 1946 (79–80 years old)	December 5, 1985	June 3, 1986	Republican
—	Ed Struiksma; Born 1946 (79–80 years old)	N/A^{[h]}		Republican
31	Maureen O'Connor; Born 1946 (80 years old)	June 3, 1986	December 7, 1992	Democratic
31	Maureen O'Connor; Born 1946 (80 years old)	1986, 1988		Democratic
32	Susan Golding; Born 1945 (81 years old)	December 7, 1992	December 4, 2000	Republican
32	Susan Golding; Born 1945 (81 years old)	1992, 1996		Republican
33	Dick Murphy; Born 1942 (83 years old)	December 4, 2000	July 15, 2005	Republican
33	Dick Murphy; Born 1942 (83 years old)	2000, 2004^{[i]}		Republican
—	Michael Zucchet; Born 1969 (56 years old)	July 15, 2005	July 18, 2005	Democratic
—	Michael Zucchet; Born 1969 (56 years old)	N/A^{[i]}		Democratic
—	Toni Atkins; Born 1962 (64 years old)	July 18, 2005	December 5, 2005	Democratic
—	Toni Atkins; Born 1962 (64 years old)	N/A^{[i]}		Democratic
34	Jerry Sanders; Born 1950 (76 years old)	December 5, 2005	December 3, 2012	Republican
34	Jerry Sanders; Born 1950 (76 years old)	2005, 2008		Republican
35	Bob Filner; 1942–2025 (aged 82)	December 3, 2012	August 30, 2013	Democratic
35	Bob Filner; 1942–2025 (aged 82)	2012^{[j]}		Democratic
—	Todd Gloria; Born 1978 (48 years old)	August 30, 2013	March 3, 2014	Democratic
—	Todd Gloria; Born 1978 (48 years old)	N/A^{[j]}		Democratic
36	Kevin Faulconer; Born 1967 (59 years old)	March 3, 2014	December 10, 2020	Republican
36	Kevin Faulconer; Born 1967 (59 years old)	2013–2014, 2016		Republican
37	Todd Gloria; Born 1978 (48 years old)	December 10, 2020	Incumbent	Democratic
37	Todd Gloria; Born 1978 (48 years old)	2020, 2024		Democratic

== Presidents of the Board of Trustees ==
After San Diego's bankruptcy in 1852, the State of California took over city government and ran the city with an appointed board of trustees during 1852–1888. The president of the board was called mayor by courtesy, although there was no official office of mayor. When the office of president was vacated due to death or resignation, the board of trustees would choose a president pro tempore to preside over meetings until a permanent president could be elected by the board.

#	President	Term start	Term end	Party
1	Charles P. Noell	March 25, 1852	June 9, 1852	Democratic
2	James W. Robinson	July 31, 1852	September 10, 1853	Democratic
3	Louis Rose	September 10, 1853	April 24, 1855	Democratic
4	Jesse Julian Ames	April 24, 1855	March 20, 1856	
5	Thomas Collins	March 20, 1856	July 14, 1857	
6	Henry H. Whaley	July 14, 1857	May 4, 1858	Whig
7	Thomas Whaley	May 4, 1858	March 23, 1859	Whig
8	Jacob C. Bogart	March 23, 1859	March 18, 1860	Democratic
9	Rufus B. Tebbetts	March 18, 1860	June 30, 1862	
10	David B. Kurtz	June 30, 1862	March 30, 1865	Democratic
11	Andrew Cassidy	March 30, 1865	April 30, 1867	Democratic
12	Joseph S. Manasse	April 30, 1867	April 29, 1868	
13	Jose G. Estudillo	April 29, 1868	March 5, 1869	
14	James McCoy	March 5, 1869	May 13, 1872	Democratic
15	William J. McCormick	May 13, 1872	March 31, 1873	
16	David W. Briant	April 21, 1873	May 21, 1874	
17	E. A. Veazie	May 21, 1874	December 18, 1874	
18	William A. Begole	February 1, 1875	May 22, 1876	
19	J. M. Boyd	May 22, 1876	March 7, 1877	
20	D. O. McCarthy	April 2, 1877	June 1, 1880	
21	S. P. Jones	June 1, 1880	October 5, 1883	
22	John H. Snyder	May 21, 1884	May 26, 1886	
23	William W. Stewart	May 26, 1886	June 7, 1886	
23	Charles S. Hamilton	June 7, 1886	April 18, 1887	Democratic
24	Martin D. Hamilton	April 18, 1887	January 3, 1888	Republican

== Notes and references ==
=== Notes ===
- ^{a} Party affiliation is shown for each mayor, when known. However, election of mayor under the current charter is officially nonpartisan.
- ^{b} From 1852 until 1888, San Diego was governed by a board of trustees, so there was no official mayor.
- ^{c} William Jefferson Hunsaker resigned from office, likely due to frustration from losing a power struggle against rivals on the city council. Martin D. Hamilton served as acting mayor until the next election could be held.
- ^{d} Both acting mayor Martin D. Hamilton and fourth mayor Douglas Gunn ran as Republicans on the "Citizens' Non-Partisan" ticket.
- ^{e} John F. Forward Jr. resigned from office after failing in his attempt to fire the city manager. Rutherford B. Irones was appointed to finish the balance of his term. However, Irones himself would later resign after being convicted of drunk driving and a hit-and-run traffic accident. Vice mayor Albert W. Bennett then served as acting mayor until a new election could be held.
- ^{f} Percy J. Benbough died in office of natural causes. Vice mayor Fred W. Simpson then served briefly as acting mayor until Howard B. Bard was appointed to finish the balance of Benbough's term.
- ^{g} Pete Wilson resigned from office to join the United States Senate. Bill Cleator served as acting mayor until a new election could be held.
- ^{h} Roger Hedgecock resigned from office due to convictions on felony conspiracy and perjury charges that were later overturned. Ed Struiksma served as acting mayor until a new election could be held.
- ^{i} Dick Murphy resigned from office amid criticism for his role in the San Diego pension scandal and after failing to win a majority of the votes in the 2004 election. Michael Zucchet served as acting mayor for three days before he too resigned due to a corruption conviction that was later overturned. A week later, the City Council elected Toni Atkins to serve as acting mayor until a new election could be held.
- ^{j} Bob Filner resigned from office amid multiple allegations of sexual harassment. Todd Gloria served as interim mayor until a new mayor was elected.
