= 1996 San Diego mayoral election =

- March 26, 1996
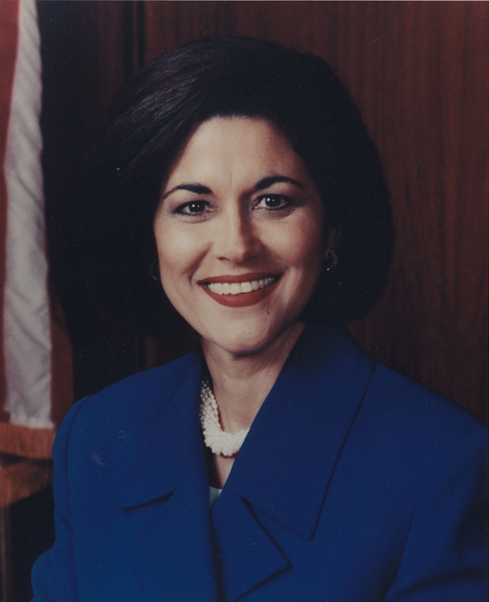

Nominee	Susan Golding	Jim Bell
Party	Republican	Democratic
Popular vote	157,385	12,853
Percentage	78.3%	6.4%
Mayor before election
Susan Golding
Republican
Elected mayor
Susan Golding
Republican

The 1996 San Diego mayoral election was held on Tuesday, March 26, 1996, to elect the mayor for San Diego. Incumbent mayor Susan Golding stood for reelection.

Municipal elections in California are officially non-partisan, though some candidates do receive funding and support from various political parties. The non-partisan primary was held Tuesday, March 26, 1996. Since the incumbent Golding received a majority of primary votes, she was reelected outright with no need for a runoff in the November general election.

== Candidates ==
- Susan Golding, mayor of San Diego (Party preference: Republican)
- Jim Bell, environmental designer (Party preference: Democratic)
- Patrick Coleman, marketing consultant and retired police officer (Party preference: Democratic)
- Loch David Crane, magician, college instructor, and perennial candidate
- Jim Turner, civil engineer
- Jim Hart, aircraft mechanic and perennial candidate (Party preference: Republican)

== Campaign ==
Incumbent mayor Susan Golding was seen as an overwhelming favorite going into the election against five relatively unknown candidates with little prior political experience. She refused to participate in debates against her five challengers. On March 26, 1996, Golding received an overwhelming majority of the votes and was easily re-elected mayor.

== Primary election results ==
San Diego mayoral primary election, 1996
Party	Candidate	Votes	%
Republican	Susan Golding (incumbent)	157,385	78.3
Democratic	Jim Bell	12,853	6.4
Democratic	Patrick Coleman	12,019	6.0
Nonpartisan	Loch David Crane	7,748	3.9
Nonpartisan	Jim Turner	5,702	2.8
Republican	James Hart	5,295	2.6
Total votes		200,002	100

== General election ==
Because Golding won a majority of the votes in the March primary, there was no need for a runoff in the November general election.
