= 1893 San Diego mayoral election =

- April 4, 1893
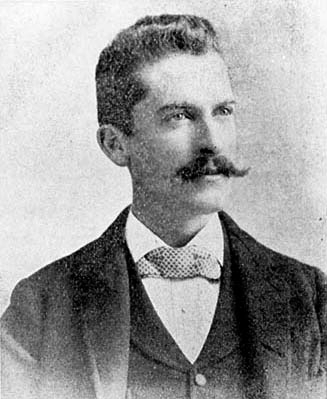

Nominee	William H. Carlson	Adolph Gassen
Party	Independent	Republican
Popular vote	1,219	614
Percentage	46.8%	23.6%
Nominee	A.E. Cochran	John Kastle
Party	Democratic	Populist
Popular vote	465	210
Percentage	17.8%	8.1%
Mayor before election
Matthew Sherman
Republican
Elected mayor
William H. Carlson
Independent

The 1893 San Diego mayoral election was held on April 4, 1893, to elect the mayor for San Diego. William H. Carlson was elected Mayor with a plurality of the votes.

== Candidates ==
- William H. Carlson, real estate developer
- A.E. Cochran, lawyer
- James Friend, newspaper writer
- Adolph Gassen, former city marshal
- John Kastle, real estate developer

== Campaign ==
The 1893 election featured a field of five candidates. The Democrats, Republicans, and the People's Party each fielded one candidate. In addition to the regular parties, two independents also ran.

Many of the candidates had long roots in the City of San Diego prior to the election. Adolph Gassen had previously held other elected office within the city. John Kastle of the People's Party had previously served as president of the Chamber of Commerce. A.E. Cochran had been active in Democratic Party.

Independent candidate William H. Carlson campaigned vigorously, making numerous extravagant campaign promises, including electric car lines on every street, luxury hotels, steamship lines to every port on earth, transcontinental railroads, and jobs with high wages for all.

On April 4, 1893, Carlson was elected mayor with a plurality of 46.8 percent of the vote, nearly twice as many votes as his closest competitor.

== Election results ==
San Diego mayoral election, 1893
Party	Candidate	Votes	%
Independent	William H. Carlson	1,219	46.8
Republican	Adolph Gassen	614	23.6
Democratic	A.E. Cochran	465	17.8
Populist	John Kastle	210	8.1
Independent	James Friend	98	3.8
Total votes		2,606	100
