= Andrew Cassidy =

American politician (1817–1907)

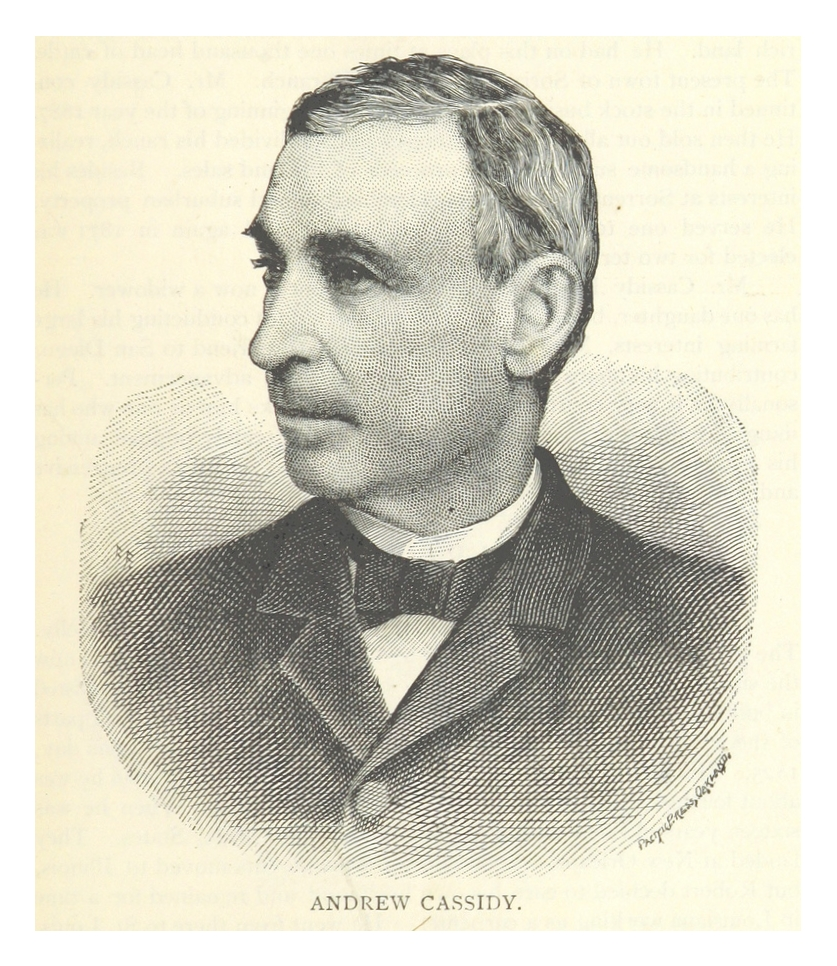
- Andrew Cassidy (c. 1885)
- Born: c. 1817; County Cavan, Ireland
- Died: November 25, 1907; San Diego, California, U.S.
- Resting place: Pioneer Park (San Diego); 32.7492°N 117.1776°W
- Occupations: Engineer, Rancher, Public Official
- Political party: Democratic
- Spouses: Rosa Serrano (married 1863–1870); * Mary Providencia Smith (married 1870s–1878)
- Children: Mary Winifred Cassidy

Deputy Collector of Customs
- Incumbent
- Assumed office 1860

President of the San Diego board of trustees
- In office 1865–1867

Member of the San Diego County Board of Supervisors
- In office 1871–1875

Member of the Board of Public Works

Andrew Cassidy (c. 1817 – November 25, 1907) was an early settler of San Diego, California.

== Biography ==
Cassidy was born in County Cavan, Ireland and came to America in 1834 when 17.

For three years he and was in the Engineering Corps at West Point, under General George B. McClellan. He then went to Washington, D. C. to work for the Coast Survey Office, under Professor Alexander Bache. About a year later, he was sent to the Pacific Coast as part of a party under Lieutenant William Trowbridge, U. S. Engineers. They reached San Francisco in July, 1853, and a month later came to San Diego, where they built a self-recording tidal gauge station at La Playa in September and left Cassidy in charge. He remained in charge of the tidal gauge and weather observations for seventeen years. He also collected specimens for the Smithsonian Institution. This gauge recorded a tsunami from Japan in December 1854 and a local earthquake in July 1854. This is believed to be one of the earliest locally recorded earthquakes. He was also an eyewitness to the only locally generated tsunami to affect the San Diego area, which occurred on 27 May 1862. The tidal gauge was being repaired at the time, so there is no quantitative record of the event.

In 1863 Cassidy married his first wife Rosa Serrano, daughter of José Antonio Serrano and Rafaela Nieves Aquilar. Rosa was only 15 at the time, and she died a few years later, on February 11, 1870. She is buried at El Campo Santo Cemetery in Old Town San Diego. Around the time of his marriage, he acquired Rancho Pauma in San Luis Rey from his father-in-law.

Cassidy's second wife was Mary Providencia Smith, daughter of Albert B. Smith and Guadalupe Machado Wilder de Smith. She was born 1858 and died of cholera September 16, 1878. They had one daughter, Mary Winifred.

In 1864, Mr. Cassidy bought Rancho Soledad, containing 1000 acres (4 km^{2}), in present Sorrento Valley, San Diego. He raised livestock there until 1887 when he sold the property. This and other property made him prosperous.

Cassidy held several public offices and was a member of the Democratic Party. He was appointed Deputy Collector of Customs in 1860. Kurtz was president of the San Diego board of trustees during 1865–1867, when San Diego did not have a Mayoral form of government. During 1871–1875, he was member of the San Diego County Board of Supervisors. He was also a member of the Board of Public Works.

Cassidy died from "senile debility" in 1907.

== Legacy ==
Cassidy Street in Oceanside, California is named for him.

Preceded by David B. Kurtz	President of the San Diego Board of Trustees; 1865–1867	Succeeded by Joseph S. Manasse
