= Walter W. Austin =

20th Mayor of San Diego (1880–1951)

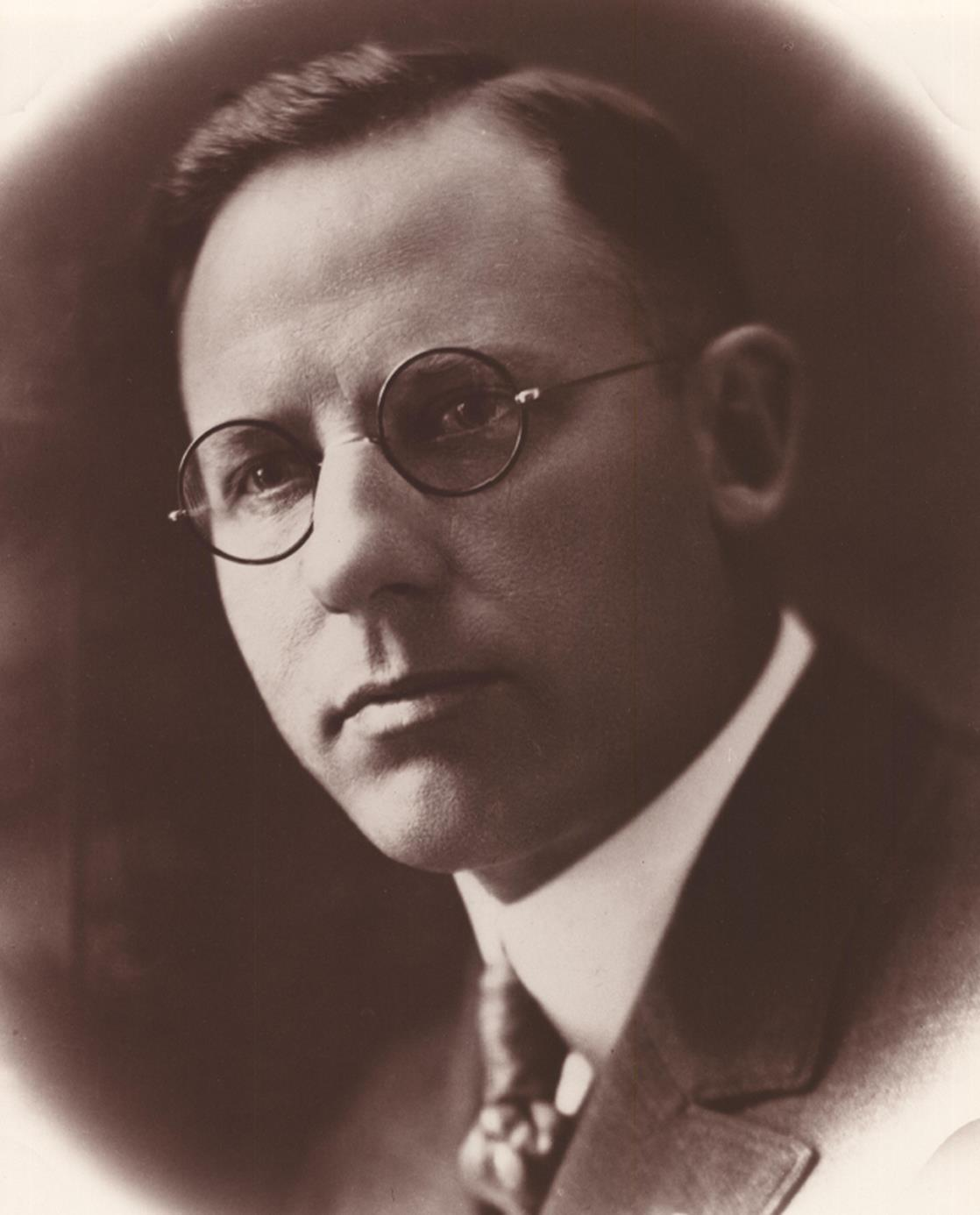

20th Mayor of San Diego
- In office May 4, 1931 – May 2, 1932
- Preceded by: Harry C. Clark
- Succeeded by: John F. Forward Jr.

Personal details
- Born: September 22, 1880 Kendall, Wisconsin, U.S.
- Died: July 12, 1951 (aged 70) San Diego, California, U.S.
- Resting place: Cypress View Mausoleum, San Diego, California
- Party: Republican

Walter Wolcott Austin (September 22, 1880 – July 12, 1951) was an American Republican politician from California.

== Early life ==
Austin was born 1880 in Kendall, Wisconsin, and moved to Chicago, Illinois, with his family, where he was a newsboy at age 7, and to Aberdeen, South Dakota. In 1912, he moved to San Diego, California.

In San Diego Austin started out as employee of the H. D. Field Safe Co., which he later purchased half-interest then full interest and renamed it Austin Safe and Desk Company. Austin sold the business, and the company later specialised in office furniture then interior design. Austin entered the real estate and insurance business around 1931, and vice president of Fraser Mortgage Co.

== Politics ==
Austin was elected mayor of San Diego in 1931 as a young reformer. The main issue was the $8.5 million spent for water projects, such as Lake Hodges Dam, with little to show for it. Austin served as mayor until 1932. In 1940, he supported construction of San Vicente Dam and extending the water system.

While mayor, the city sold unemployment bonds to increase jobs locally. Funds were spent on projects such as building pedestrian tunnels near schools. Austin also backed establishing a school traffic patrol system.

Austin was the first mayor under a new city charter, approved in the same election that elected him mayor. The charter specified a "weak mayor" or council-manager government. A city manager appointed by the city council managed day-to-day business and the mayor presided over the Council meetings, with no veto power. The motivation was to help stem police corruption, under the idea that an appointed city manager is less subject to bribes and campaign contribution favors than an elected strong Mayor. Council-manager government originated with the Progressive movement in Staunton, Virginia. This form survived until 2006 when it was replaced by a strong mayor city government.

Austin was a long time Republican and was chairman of the Willkie Committee for San Diego in 1940. Austin was founder and president of the Executives Association of San Diego and the San Diego Business Men's Art Club. Austin also was a director of various charities.

== Personal life ==
Austin was one of the first to build a house at Borrego Springs where he spent much time during retirement. He also built a three-story house in Bankers Hill, a San Diego area just north of downtown, in the 1920s. The Bankers Hill house still includes stained glass that was handmade by Austin.

Austin died on July 12, 1951, at Mercy Hospital in San Diego from complications of appendicitis. He initially fell ill at his Idyllwild, California residence in Riverside County. His children are Genevieve Irene, Virginia Lucille, Warren Wolcott, Gladys Viola, and Edgar Owen.

Political offices
Preceded by Harry C. Clark	Mayor of San Diego; 1931–1932	Succeeded by John F. Forward Jr.
