= Frank P. Frary =

American politician and 10th Mayor of San Diego (1856–1911)

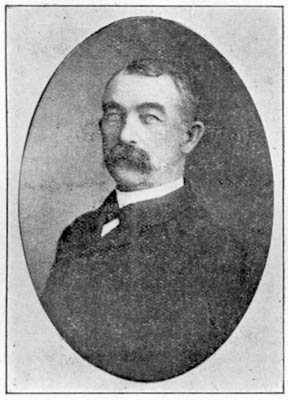

10th Mayor of San Diego
- In office May 6, 1901 – May 1, 1905
- Preceded by: Edwin M. Capps
- Succeeded by: John L. Sehon

Personal details
- Born: December 7, 1856 Fremont, Ohio
- Died: August 16, 1911 (aged 54)
- Party: Republican

Frank Phineas Frary (December 7, 1856 – August 16, 1911) was an American Republican politician from California. He was born in Fremont, Ohio, and moved to San Diego, California, in 1875. Starting as an agent and driver on a stage line between San Diego and San Luis Rey, he eventually obtained a government contract to carry mail between San Diego and Julian and also to Cuyamaca. This work led to the establishment of a general hauling business, which was quite successful. Frank headed this company until 1910, when ill health forced his retirement. Frank also owned a bee ranch at Capitan Grande, near El Cajon.

In addition to his business activities, Frank was active as a politician. He served as a member of the San Diego Board of Delegates for six years and as President of the Board in 1902. A Republican, he was then nominated for mayor and won the race against Patterson Sprigg by a count of 1674 to 1000. He was reelected in 1904 by a substantial margin against a Democrat who proposed a number of social measures, such as public ownership of the local gas company.

It is reported that in 1903 police raided Madam Ida Bailey's Canary Cottage, a house of prostitution in the Stingaree District and that the usual advance warnings were not made. Hence, reputed customers, Mayor Frary and the chief of police, may have been inconvenienced.

Frary's 1904 Craftsman style home at 3227 Grim Ave in North Park is now a bed and breakfast.

Frary died in 1911 and is buried at Mount Hope Cemetery in San Diego.

Political offices
Preceded by Edwin M. Capps	Mayor of San Diego, California; 1901–1905	Succeeded by John L. Sehon
