= Harry C. Clark =

American politician (1883–1950)

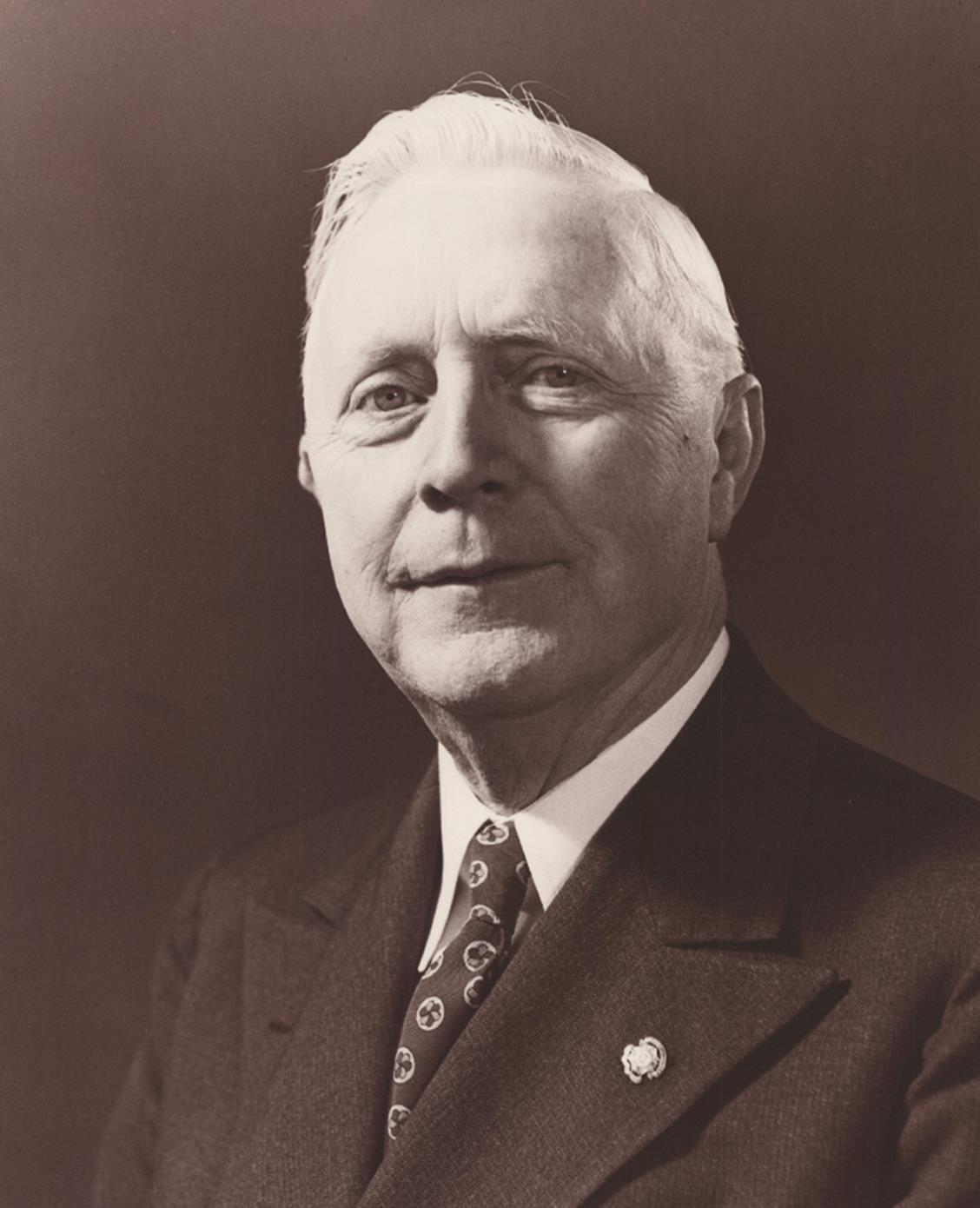

19th Mayor of San Diego
- In office May 2, 1927 – May 4, 1931
- Preceded by: John L. Bacon
- Succeeded by: Walter W. Austin

Personal details
- Born: Harry Camp Clark; June 8, 1883 Bay City, Michigan, U.S.
- Died: December 27, 1950 (aged 67) San Diego, California, U.S.
- Party: Republican
- Spouse: Georgia L. Kessinger
- Children: Harry C. Clark, Jr.
- Education: University of Vermont

Harry Camp Clark (June 8, 1883 – December 27, 1950) was an American Republican politician from California.

== Early life ==
Harry Clark was born on June 8, 1883 in Bay City, Michigan, to Herman and Melissa Clark. In 1907, he graduated from the University of Vermont with a degree in civil engineering. After graduation, he worked in Massachusetts and Louisville, Kentucky, where he was in charge of building a sewer system.

== Legal, political, and military career ==
In 1911, he moved to San Diego, California, to join his mother and two sisters. He took up road surveying and studied law, and was admitted to the bar in 1918. Clark became an able and popular lawyer, and was president of the County Bar Association in 1927. Clark served as mayor of San Diego from 1927 to 1931. He was defeated in 1931, where the main issue was the $8.5 million spent for water projects, such as Lake Hodges Dam, with little to show for it. Clark served as Deputy City Attorney after his term as mayor. During World War I, he was second lieutenant of the Quartermaster's Corps and served overseas for a year. He took part in the Battle of Saint-Mihiel and the Meuse–Argonne offensive. He was promoted to captain before he was discharged.

== Personal life ==
On June 6, 1911, Clark married Georgia L. Kessinger in San Diego. She was born May 14, 1876, in Ohio and died December 22, 1963, in San Diego. They had at least one son, Harry C., Jr. Clark died on December 27, 1950 of a heart attack at his home in San Diego.

Political offices
| Preceded by John L. Bacon | Mayor of San Diego, California; 1927–1931 | Succeeded by Walter W. Austin |
