= Louis J. Wilde =

American banker and Republican politician from California (1865–1924)

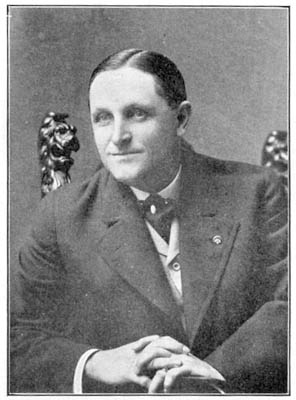

17th Mayor of San Diego
- In office May 7, 1917 – May 2, 1921
- Preceded by: Edwin M. Capps
- Succeeded by: John L. Bacon

Personal details
- Born: July 16, 1865 Iowa City, Iowa
- Died: April 18, 1924 (aged 58) Los Angeles, California
- Party: Republican
- Profession: banker

Louis J. Wilde (July 16, 1865 – April 18, 1924) was an American banker and Republican politician from California. Wilde was born in Iowa City, Iowa, in 1865. After living in Rochester, New York; Philadelphia; and St. Paul, Minnesota, he moved to San Diego in 1903.

He intended to spend only a winter in San Diego, but liked it so well that he stayed and went into the real estate and banking businesses. In San Diego he organized four banks, built the city's first modern apartment house, built the Pickwick Theatre, raised money to complete unfinished U. S. Grant Hotel, and in 1914 successfully argued for renaming D Street to Broadway.

He served as mayor of San Diego during 1917–1921. The 1917 race was a classic growth-vs.-beautification debate. Wilde argued for more business development; his opponent, department store owner George Marston, argued for better city planning with more open space and grand boulevards. Wilde called Marston "Geranium George", painting him as unfriendly to business. Wilde's campaign slogan was "More Smokestacks", and during the campaign he drew a great smokestack belching smoke on a truck through the city streets. The phrase "smokestacks vs. geraniums" is still used in San Diego to characterize this type of debate. Wilde won, with the support of unions and business, and was re-elected two years later.

As mayor, Wilde was outspoken and not afraid to say what he thought, and had a sense of humor. Whenever he spoke, he drew crowds. During a council meeting in 1920 he grabbed a gavel and lunged at a councilman, scolding him for berating a reporter, and mashed his own finger and injured his leg. After that date he refused to enter city hall. He conducted business through a messenger from the U. S. Grant Hotel.

In 1920 Wilde organized the Community Oil Well Company to drill for oil in San Diego County. No oil was found, and the San Diego Sun's investigation accused the venture of improper spending.

Wilde decided to not run for a third term in 1921, under a cloud of scandal. He left town and moved to Los Angeles, where he died in 1924.

Wilde had two children (Donald Wilde and Richard Edward Wilde, Sr.) by his first wife, Mamie Shaffer and two children (John D. Wilde, Sr. (Jack)and Lucile Wilde) by his second wife, Frances O'Brien.

== Quotes ==
Remember, that this is a fight to the last ditch for the wage earner, against big interests, high taxes, bond issues and expensive parks and flowers along millionaire row, against big expenditures for the pleasure of a few smug plutocrats. [Arguing for the laborer's vote against Marston in the 1917 election]

Political offices
Preceded by Edwin M. Capps	Mayor of San Diego, California; 1917–1921	Succeeded by John L. Bacon
