= Frank Curran (politician) =

American politician (1912–1992)

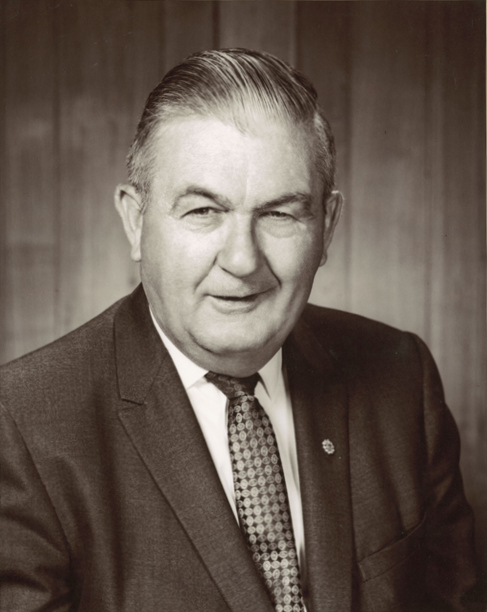

28th Mayor of San Diego
- In office December 2, 1963 – December 6, 1971
- Preceded by: Charles Dail
- Succeeded by: Pete Wilson

43rd President of the National League of Cities
- In office 1970
- Preceded by: Beverly Briley
- Succeeded by: Richard Lugar

Member of the San Diego City Council
- In office 1955–1963

Personal details
- Born: December 19, 1912 Cleveland, Ohio
- Died: October 18, 1992 (aged 79) San Diego, California
- Party: Democratic

Francis Earl Curran (December 19, 1912 – October 18, 1992) was an American Democratic politician from California.

== Biography ==
Frank Curran was born in 1912 in Cleveland, Ohio. His father was a boxer under the name "Red Kenney" and operated a wallpaper-hanging business. The family moved to Oceanside, California, in 1919. Curran met his wife Florance on the Oceanside Pier and they were married in 1936. She was born 1913 in Denver.

Curran was elected to the San Diego City Council and served from 1955–1963. He was elected mayor of San Diego in 1962, and served between 1963 and 1971. During his term, the Civic Center was built and a ballot issue passed to build a new stadium in Mission Valley as well as a metropolitan sewer system. He said "If we hadn't built that, we couldn't have done anything else." At the end of his term Curran was embroiled in the "Yellow Cab" bribery scandal. It was alleged he raised taxi rates for campaign contributions. He and seven city council members were indicted. Curran was cleared by a jury, but could not escape the charge politically. He did not resign, but his hopes of running again for any office were lost. After Curran left as mayor he continued to be active in civic affairs. He was director for the Central City Association.

In 1970, Curran served as the president of the National League of Cities.

Curran died in 1992 after suffering from a broken vertebra and is buried at Eternal Hills Memorial Park. His wife Florance died January 4, 2000. Curran's brother Richard was a Municipal Court judge.

== San Diego City College ==
Curran took classes at San Diego Junior College, now San Diego City College. While mayor he had a walkway built over a busy street so students could easily cross to get to classes. After Curran's widow died, it was found out he left his entire estate, worth about US$1,000,000, to City College. Curran Plaza was named to honor his efforts for City College.

Political offices
Preceded by Charles Dail	Mayor of San Diego; 1963—1971	Succeeded by Pete Wilson
