= John L. Bacon =

18th Mayor of San Diego (1878–1961)

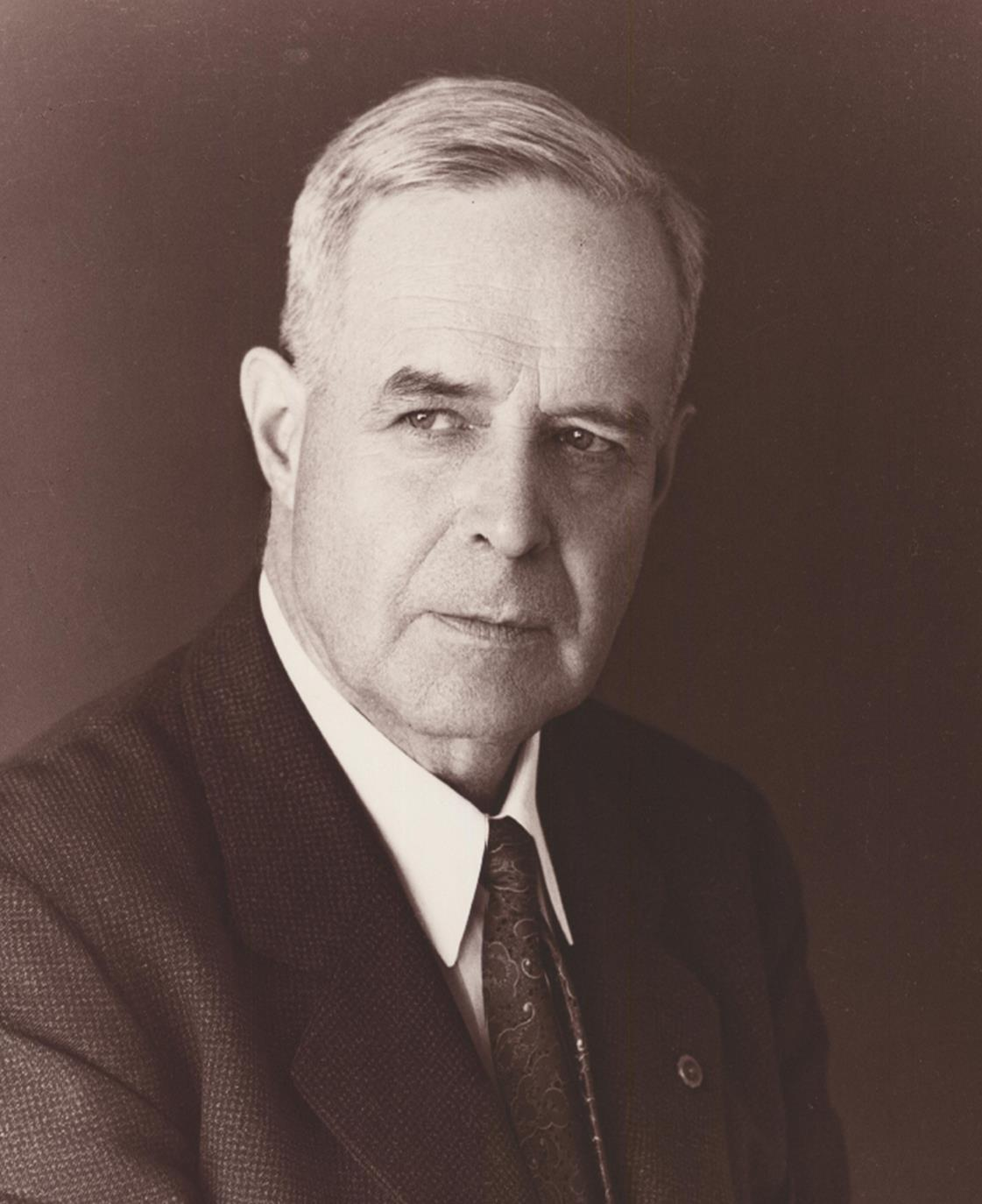

18th Mayor of San Diego
- In office May 2, 1921 – May 2, 1927
- Preceded by: Louis J. Wilde
- Succeeded by: Harry C. Clark

Personal details
- Born: November 3, 1878 Illinois
- Died: April 25, 1961 (aged 82) San Diego
- Party: Republican

John L. Bacon (November 3, 1878 – April 25, 1961) was an American civil engineer and Republican politician from California.

Bacon was born in 1878 in Illinois. By 1914, he was in San Diego, when he was on a Panama–California Exposition committee. He was a structural engineer and helped lay out the aquatic features of the San Diego Zoo.

Bacon was elected mayor of San Diego, serving from 1921 to 1927. An important issue of the day was the construction of water projects to enable San Diego to grow and prosper. After problems with water development, and as property valuations (and therefore taxes) increased, confidence in Bacon declined enough that in 1928 Bacon declined to seek re-election.

During and after his term as mayor, Bacon was president of Boulder Dam Association, a group that promoted funding for the construction of Hoover Dam, and was seeking a share of Colorado River water for use by Southern California cities.

Bacon died in 1961 in San Diego.

== Quote ==
I would rather see 100 tourists come to San Diego, spend a month or a season, be busy every minute with healthful, outdoor entertainment, and go back home to tell their relatives and neighbors that San Diego is the greatest town in America than to have 10,000 tourists come, stay 24 hours, and go away "knocking" because they had a dull time.

— Speaking in favor of the proposed San Diego Zoo, 1922

Political offices
Preceded by Louis J. Wilde	Mayor of San Diego, California; 1921–1927	Succeeded by Harry C. Clark
