= Edwin M. Capps =

9th and 16th Mayor of San Diego (1860–1938)

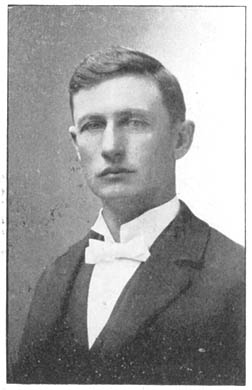

9th & 16th Mayor of San Diego
- In office May 3, 1915 – May 7, 1917
- Preceded by: Charles F. O'Neall
- Succeeded by: Louis J. Wilde
- In office May 1, 1899 – May 6, 1901
- Preceded by: Daniel C. Reed
- Succeeded by: Frank P. Frary

Personal details
- Born: December 23, 1860 Knoxville, Tennessee, U.S.
- Died: January 16, 1938 (aged 77) Los Angeles, California, U.S.
- Party: Democratic

Edwin M. Capps (December 23, 1860 – January 16, 1938) was an American Democratic politician from California.

== Biography ==
Capps was born in 1860 in Knoxville, Tennessee. His father was Thomas J. Capps, professor of mathematics at East Tennessee University. He grew in Shelbyville, Illinois, and his family moved to Golden, Colorado, where he apprenticed as a civil engineer.

In 1886 Capps moved to San Diego where he was a mining engineer and real estate agent. He became city engineer of San Diego in 1893, designed the new city police station and jail in 1911 and the Spruce Street suspension footbridge in 1912. He was in charge of harbor improvements in 1912, to handle increased traffic anticipated by the completion of the Panama Canal. He came up with the "Capps' Plan" to dredge the harbor, fill the shoreline, and erect piers, wharves, seawalls, and warehouses.

Capps served twice as mayor, first from 1899 to 1901 and again from 1915 to 1917. He was San Diego's first Democratic mayor. In 1915 San Diego was suffering from a multi-year drought. In December 1915, Capps and the city council hired a rainmaker, who guaranteed rain and wouldn't charge if it didn't rain, Charley Hatfield. He supposedly achieved success in 1904 in Los Angeles. Hatfield set up shop in Mission Valley by burning noxious fumes to "seed" clouds. However, what happened was a disastrous flood in January 1916 and the city reneged on the contract and refused to pay Hatfield anything.

Capps believed that the future of San Diego lay in tourism rather than factories. His focus as engineer and mayor was on developing tourist facilities and preserving San Diego's unique environment. With a colorful personality and a forthright approach to his plans, Capps often sparked arguments and was frequently the talk of the town.

Capps retired in 1923 and died 1938 in Los Angeles.

== Notes ==
Political offices
Preceded by Daniel C. Reed	Mayor of San Diego, California; 1899—1901	Succeeded by Frank P. Frary
Preceded by Charles F. O'Neall	Mayor of San Diego, California; 1915—1917	Succeeded by Louis J. Wilde
