= 126th Regiment =

126th Regiment may refer to:

- 126th Aviation Regiment
- 126th Baluchistan Infantry
- 126th Field Artillery Regiment
- 126th Infantry Regiment (France)
- 126th Infantry Regiment (United States)
- 126th Regiment of Foot

== American Civil War regiments ==
- 126th Illinois Infantry Regiment
- 126th New York Infantry Regiment
- 126th Ohio Infantry Regiment
- 126th Pennsylvania Infantry Regiment

== See also ==
- 126th Brigade (disambiguation)
- 126th Division (disambiguation)
- 126th (disambiguation)
