= Whaley House (San Diego, California) =

Residence, landmark, and museum in Old Town, San Diego, California, US

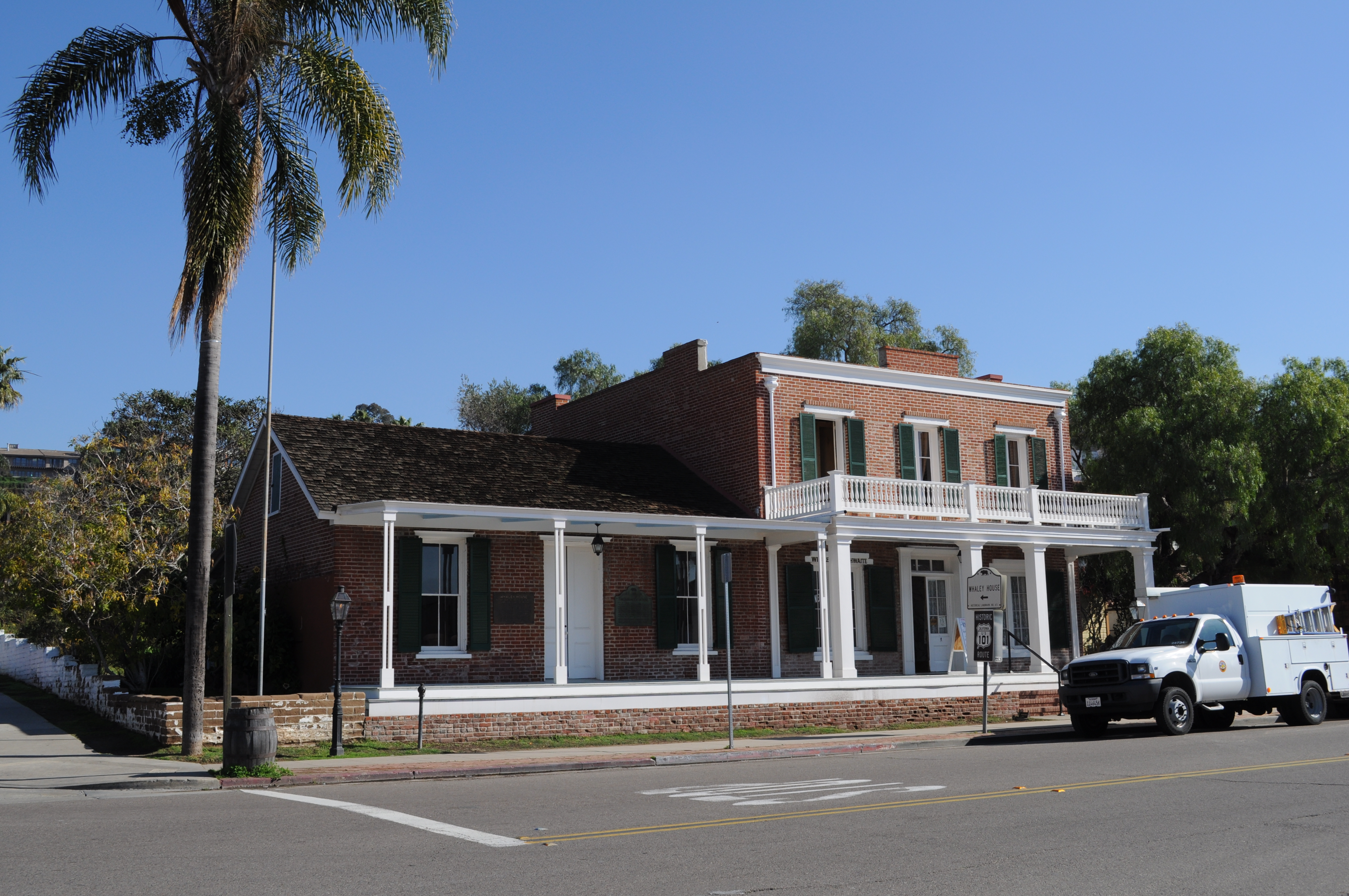
- Whaley House, 2010

- Location within San Diego Location within California Location within the United States
- Established: Original construction: 1857; Current museum: May 25, 1960
- Location: 2476 San Diego Avenue; San Diego, California
- Coordinates: 32.752828°N 117.194486°W
- Website: Official website

California Historical Landmark
- Reference no.: 65

San Diego Historic Landmark
- Reference no.: 24

The Whaley House is a Greek Revival–style residence and museum in Old Town, San Diego, California. It is the oldest brick structure in Southern California, built in 1857. It is a California Historical Landmark No. 65 and is currently maintained by Historic Tours of America, Inc (HTA).

The Whaley House was the home of Thomas Whaley and his family. At various times it also housed Whaley's general store, San Diego's second county courthouse, and the first commercial theater in San Diego. The house has "witnessed more history than any other building in the city".

== Whaley family ==
=== History ===
Thomas Whaley, of Scots-Irish origin, was born on October 5, 1823, in New York City, the seventh child in a family of ten. Whaley took over his father's successful business relations, then left New York on January 1, 1849. He traveled to San Francisco, during the California gold rush, where he engaged in business. He then went to San Diego in September 1851. Two years later, Whaley went back to New York and married Anna Eloise Delaunay on August 14, 1853. Together they returned to California, arriving in San Diego on December 7, 1853. On August 22, 1857, the Whaleys moved into their new home, now known as the Whaley House.

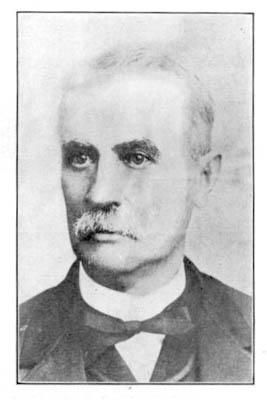
Thomas Whaley

Thomas and Anna Whaley had six children, Francis Hinton (December 28, 1854), Thomas Whaley Jr. (August 18, 1856), Anna Amelia (June 27, 1858), George Hay Ringgold (November 5, 1860), Violet Eloise (October 14, 1862), and Corinne Lillian (September 4, 1864). Francis Hinton was named after a business partner. Thomas Whaley Jr. suffered from scarlet fever at 18 months and died on January 29, 1858.

After the death of baby Thomas and the loss by fire of their store, Thomas and Anna moved to San Francisco. In January 1859, Whaley turned his affairs in Old Town over to Frank Ames, a Wells Fargo agent. In the summer of 1868, Thomas invested some of his new capital of stock in merchandise and headed back to San Diego. Thomas fixed up the old Whaley House, and Anna and the rest of the family arrived back home to San Diego on December 12, 1868.

On January 5, 1882, Violet Eloise Whaley and Anna Amelia Whaley were both married in Old San Diego. Violet married George T. Bertolacci and Anna Amelia wed her first cousin, John T. Whaley, son of Henry Hurst Whaley inside the family home. Unfortunately for Violet, just shortly after the nuptials her new husband revealed to her in a letter his sordid past. Bertolacci was a con artist, who only married Violet in the hopes of inheriting some of the Whaley family fortunes. Bertolacci vowed to prove his worthiness but Mr. and Mrs. Whaley would try to sever all contact. Suffering from melancholy, Violet committed suicide by shooting herself in the chest with Thomas's 32-calibre on August 19, 1885. She was then 22 years of age. Her suicide note reads thus:

Mad from life's history, swift to death's mystery; glad to be hurled,
anywhere, anywhere, out of this world.

— Violet Whaley, Save Our Heritage Organisation

The suicide note is a passage from 'Bridge of Sighs', a poem by Thomas Hood. This particular poem is also offered up by Edgar Allan Poe, as an example of painting with words; he spoke of it and it was referenced in his published works during his lectures.

Corinne Lillian was engaged at the time of her sister's death, but her fiancé broke off the engagement due to the scandal it raised. After these tragic events, Thomas Whaley built a single-story frame home for his family at 933 State Street in downtown San Diego and the family moved into the new residence, leaving the Whaley House vacant for over two decades.

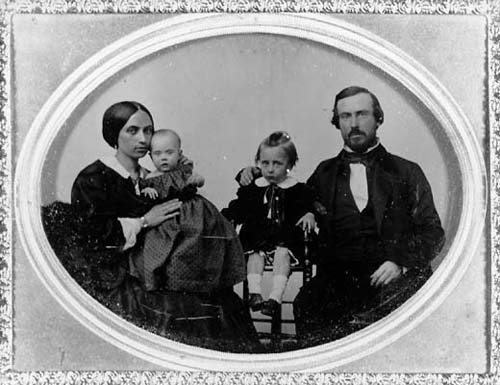
Whaley Family

Francis Whaley married Susan E. Murray in Mendocino, California on December 31, 1888. On December 14, 1890, Thomas Whaley died due to ill health at the State Street address. Anna Amelia Whaley died at Modesto, California on December 12, 1905.

Meanwhile, the old Whaley House remained vacant and fell into disrepair. In late 1909, Francis Whaley undertook the restoration of the building and turned the home into a tourist attraction, where he posted signs promoting its historicity and entertained visitors with his guitar. Anna Whaley, Thomas's widow, Corinne Lillian, Francis and George all lived in the old Whaley House in 1912. On February 24, 1913, Anna died at 80 years of age. A year later, Francis Whaley died on November 19, 1914. George Whaley died on January 5, 1928, in San Diego and, Corinne Lillian Whaley continued residency in the house until her death in 1953.

Whaley House remains well known as a haunted house. It is said that guests and the staff, from time to time, will catch a glimpse of the ghost of a Whaley family member who died inside the house such as: baby Thomas Jr., Violet, Anna, Francis, George or Corinne Lillian Whaley.

=== Whaley House ===
The Whaley House is located at the Old Town neighborhood of San Diego. The historic house opened as a museum on May 25, 1960, managed by the San Diego Historical Shrine Foundation, a non-profit organization formed in 1956 and led by James E. Reading and June A. Strudwick-Reading. June Strudwick-Reading served as the Director of the Whaley House Museum from 1960 until her death in January 1998. The Whaley House has been maintained by Save Our Heritage Organisation (SOHO) since 2000. Since 2007 a live-in caretaker has lived on the property to prevent theft and vandalism.

The two-story Greek Revival house was designed by Thomas Whaley himself and construction began on May 6, 1856. Completed in 1857, the cost of the house was more than $10,000. It was made from bricks created in Whaley's brickyard on Conde Street. The house was the first of its kind in San Diego.

My new house, when completed, will be the handsomest, most comfortable and convenient place in town or within 150 miles of here.

— Thomas Whaley, San Diego Coast Life

Whaley's new house was known as the finest in Southern California. The house was furnished with mahogany and rosewood furniture, Brussels carpets, and damask drapes and was considered a mansion for its time and place. The residence became the gathering place for San Diego. Besides being the Whaley family home, it was also San Diego's first commercial theater, the county courthouse, and a general store.

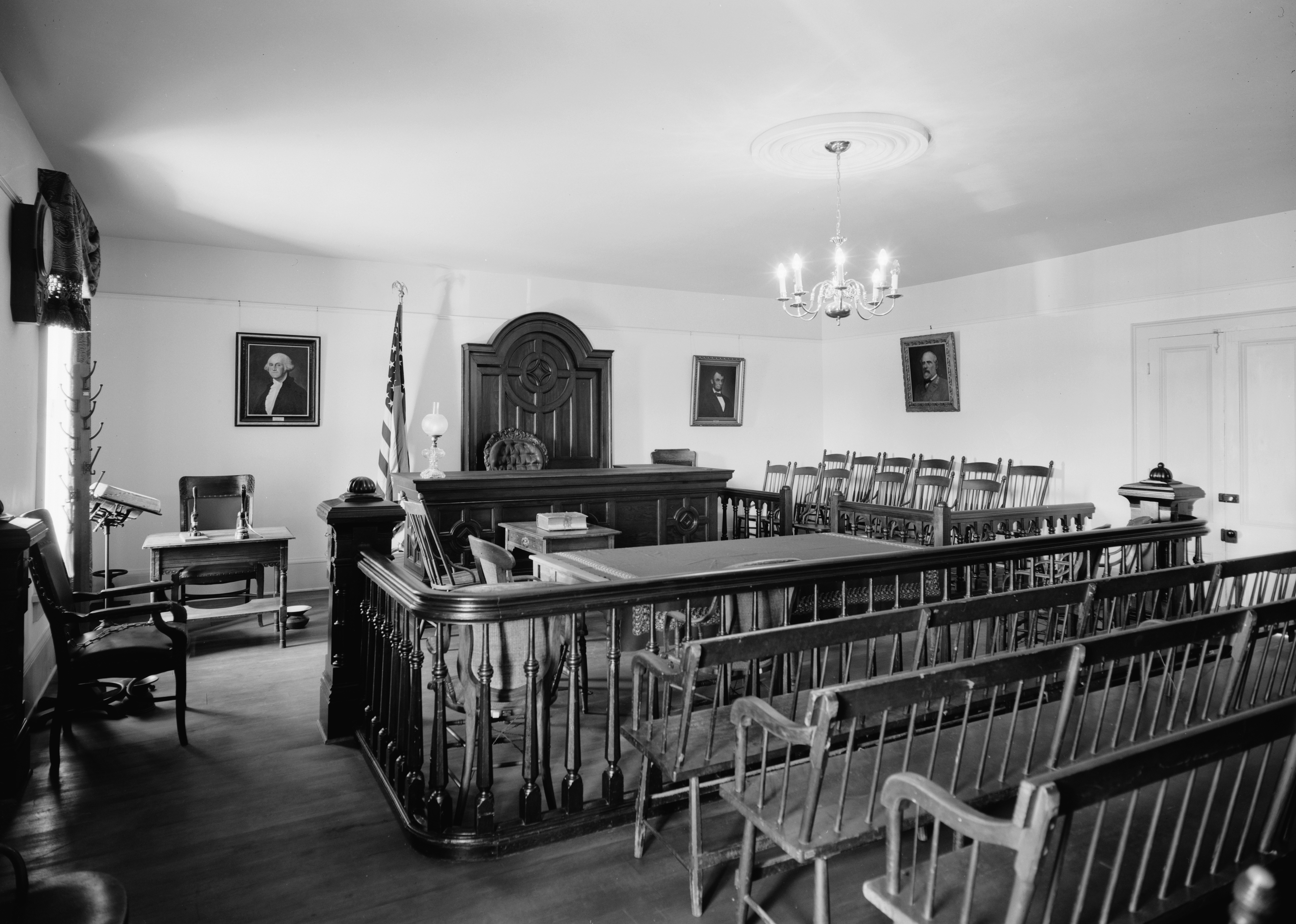
Courthouse in October 1960

In October 1868, an upstairs family bedroom was converted into a theater after Thomas Whaley rented the room out to the Tanner Troupe, a local theatre troupe traveling through San Diego at the time. For the troupe's opening night performance, the small room accommodated a stage, a few benches, and an astonishing 150 guests, although it was mostly standing room only and ladies had been advised not to wear their hoop skirts or petticoats that evening to allow for more room. The operator of the theater, Thomas Tanner, died just 17 days after opening, and his troupe had disbanded by the end of January 1869. The Whaley House also served as the county courthouse in 1869. For $65 a month, the county of San Diego leased the courtroom and three of the upstairs bedrooms. Another part of the Whaley House history was the Whaley & Crosthwaite General Store which was a wholesale and retail store.

In the 1860s and 1870s, the house became the focal point of a battle between Old Town residents and residents of New Town (current downtown) for dominance of San Diego. The San Diego County government had been renting a portion of Whaley House for its offices and records. Whaley offered several times to sell the house to the county, but the offer was ignored. New Towners demanded that the county offices and records be moved to New Town. The issue dominated local elections, with Republicans favoring New Town while Democrats favored Old Town. There were conflicting court orders; at one point the local sheriff was ordered to seize Whaley House, but refused. A judge ordered the removal of three supervisors from the Board of Supervisors, and another judge tried to appoint three other men to the posts. After several years of court battles the California Supreme Court ordered the reinstatement of the three original supervisors, who ordered that the county records be moved to New Town. Despite threats of armed resistance from the Old Towners, the records were moved on March 31, 1871, effectively shifting the focus of the city to New Town.

On May 17, 2022, the San Diego Superior Court extended its venue to the Whaley House courtroom for one day "to recognize the significance of the one-room courthouse, the late pioneer judges, and the then-landlords, the Whaley family." Judge Richard S. Whitney presided over civil proceedings 151 years after the courtroom had last been used in its official capacity.

== Rumors of hauntings ==
Shortly after the Whaley family built the house, it was said people could hear heavy footsteps in the house, which they believed to be the ghost of James "Yankee Jim" Robinson, who had earlier been hanged on the property for stealing a boat. Due to his tall height, (6.4), both his legs had to be broken to fit him in the coffin.

== Television and film ==
The Whaley House has been featured in many historical documentaries as well as a wide variety of paranormal and sci-fi shows, including Syfy Channel's Fact or Faked: Paranormal Files and Travel Channel's America's Most Haunted, in which it was stated the Whaley House was the most supernatural home in the United States.

The Whaley House was mentioned in the 2007 animated movie, Hellboy: Blood and Iron, in which one of the characters references the paranormal entity, Yankee Jim.

In 2012, the film studio, Asylum, released an independent low-budget movie titled The Haunting of Whaley House. Although the film was shot on location at the historic Bembridge House in Long Beach, California, the history and ghostly legends of the Whaley House were used as a basis for the movie.

In 2012, the Whaley House was featured on the Biography Channel's The Haunting of Regis Philbin. While filming for a local San Diego morning show in 1964, Regis Philbin visited the Whaley House Museum and claimed to have a paranormal encounter with Mrs. Whaley. Philbin stated, "You know a lot people pooh-pooh it because they can't see it. But there was something going on in that house."

On an episode of MTV's Ridiculousness, host Rob Dyrdek commented that he lived next to "the most haunted house in California" and would spend nights calling for Old Man Whaley.

In 2014, the Whaley House was featured on Ghost Adventures as the main investigation of the series' 110th episode.

In 2017, the house was featured in the first season (6th episode) of BuzzFeed Unsolved: Supernatural for a paranormal investigation. The video has garnered over 14 million views on YouTube as of 2026.

A Ghost Files episode aired in 2022 featured the Whaley House as Shane Madej and Ryan Bergara returned under Watcher, their new company formed after Buzzfeed Unsolved.

== See also ==
- Reportedly haunted locations in California
