= Elizabeth Bard Memorial Hospital =

- U.S. National Register of Historic Places
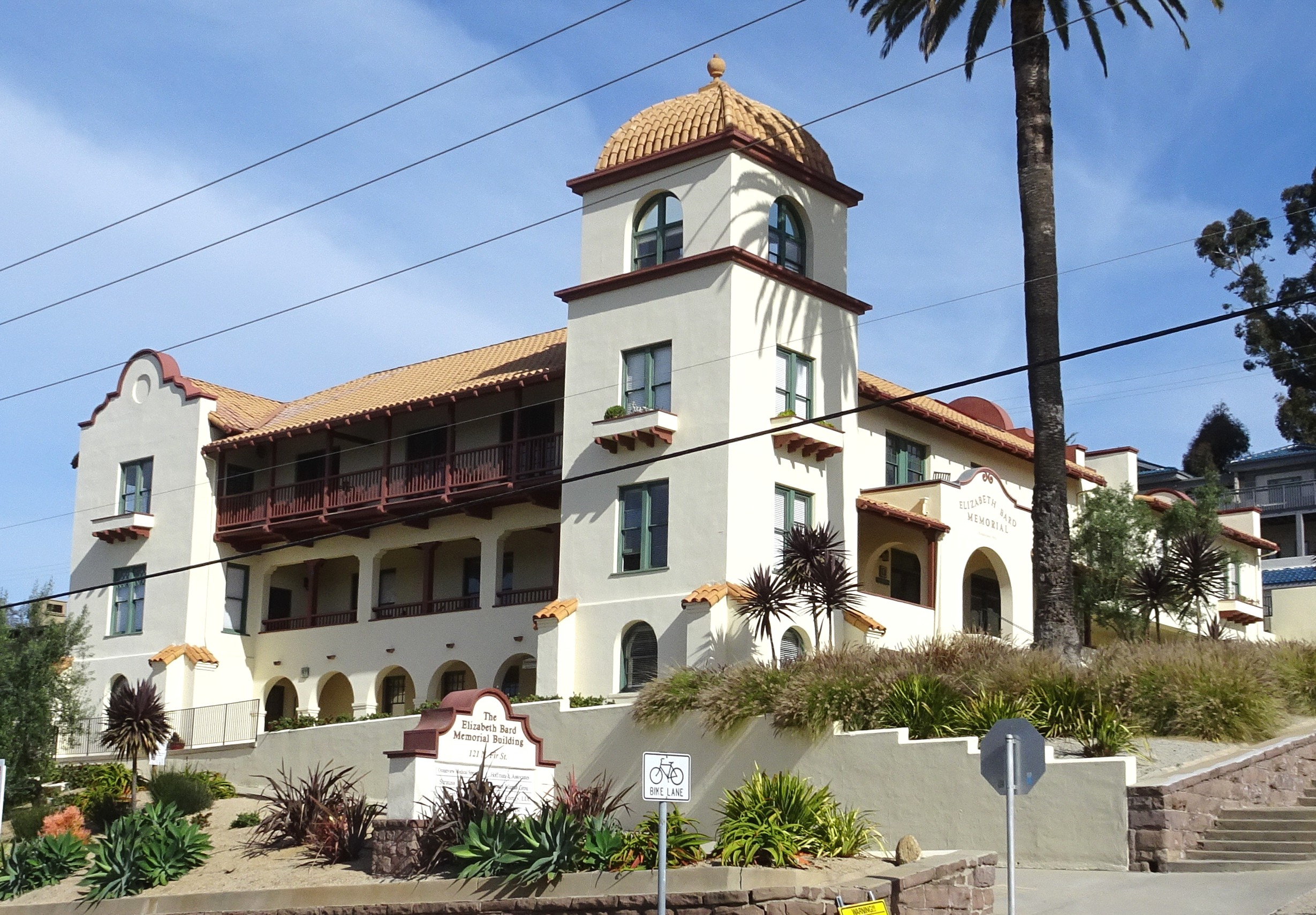
- Bard Memorial, April 2018
- Location: 121 N. Fir St., Ventura, California
- Coordinates: 34°16′56″N 119°17′18″W
- Built: 1902
- Architect: Selwyn Lock Shaw
- Architectural style: Mission/Spanish Revival
- NRHP reference No.: 77000361
- Added to NRHP: November 11, 1977

Elizabeth Bard Memorial Hospital, now known as The Elizabeth Bard Memorial Building, is a historic building in downtown Ventura, California. Built in 1901, it is a Mission Revival structure featuring covered terraces and a covered porch with a three-story bell tower at the southeast corner. The building was listed as Ventura Historic Landmark No. 19 in 1976 and was added to the National Register of Historic Places in 1977.

After being operated as a hospital for nearly 30 years, the building was sold to the County of Ventura in 1932. It was used by the county for 44 years as offices for county officials and as a detention facility. In 1982, after being sold to a private investment group, the building was extensively renovated. The building was substantially expanded at the rear of the property, but the historic front and side facades were preserved.

== Planning and construction ==
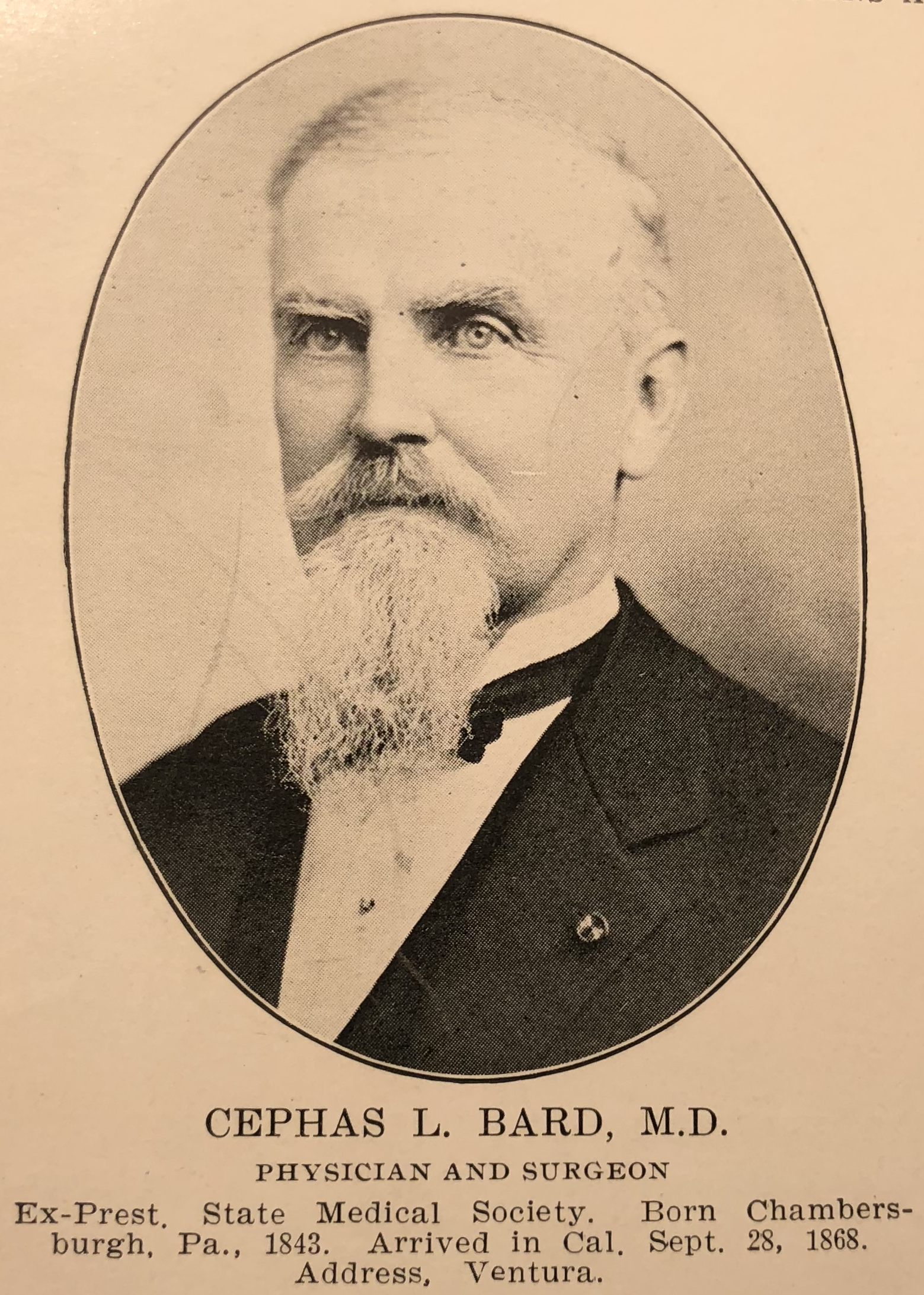
Cephas Bard, c. 1901

In 1900, Dr. Cephas L. Bard, with backing from his brother Thomas R. Bard, purchased for $3,000 a quarter of a block at the corner of Fir and Poli streets in Ventura. The land was acquired for the purpose of building a large hospital in memory of their mother, Elizabeth Bard. Cephas Bard had been practicing medicine in Ventura since 1868 and was the first president of the Ventura County Medical Association and a past president of the California State Medical Society. Thomas Bard was one of the founders of Unocal Corporation who also served as a U.S. Senator from 1900 to 1905.

Construction of the hospital continued throughout 1901. Dr. Bard traveled to the east in June 1901 to acquire furniture and equipment for the hospital.

The hospital opened in January 1902. Dr. Bard became seriously ill in February 1902 and died at the new hospital in April 1902 at age 56.

== Operation as a hospital ==
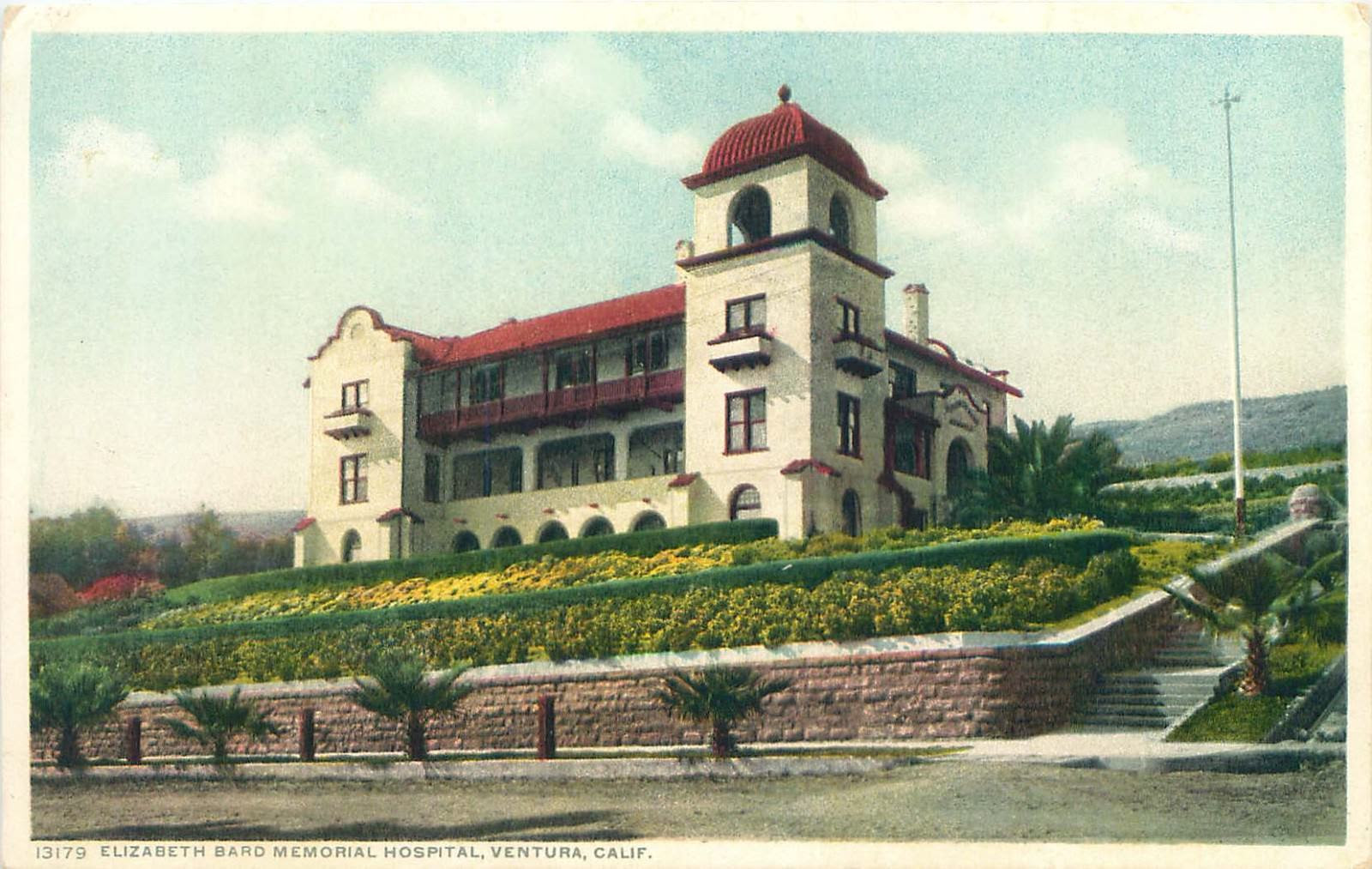
Bard Hospital, c. 1910

Following the death of Cephas Bard, members of the Bard family continued to operate the hospital for more than 20 years. In 1923, the building was donated to the Big Sisters League. For approximately eight years, the League continued to operate the hospital. During the latter years, the hospital was known as the Big Sisters Hospital.

== Use by County of Ventura ==
When the new Hospital de Buenaventura (later renamed Community Memorial Hospital) was under construction, the Big Sisters League agreed to sell the building to the City of Ventura for $60,000. However, a city bond measure to pay for the purchase was defeated by voters. In August 1931, the County of Ventura stepped in and agreed to purchase the building for $25,000. The sale closed in March 1932.

The County owned and used the building for 44 years from 1932 to 1976. In the early years after the purchase by the county, the western portion of the building became a detention facility, and other parts of the building were used as office space for the county welfare department and county statistician. In later years, it provided offices for the county's human relations commission, farm advisor, and agricultural bureau.

By 1975, the building had fallen into disrepair with peeling paint, broken windows, holes in the ceiling, and some parts deemed unsafe and used only for storage. An analyst for the County of Ventura at that time stated that the building was beyond rehabilitation, too expensive to bring up to code, would probably be demolished, and "would make a good place for some apartment."

== Historic designation and renovation ==
The City of Ventura designated the building as Ventura Historic Landmark No. 19 on March 8, 1976.

In September 1976, the County sold the building to Inventors Workshop International (IWI) for $91,500. IWI stated that it intended to renovate the building and to use a portion of the building as an exhibit center for inventions and the remainder of the building as the company's headquarters. IWI owned the building for five years and undertook only limited renovation work. The main portion of the building was declared unsafe, and IWI used only a rear annex of the building to conduct its operations.

At IWI's request, the building was listed on the National Register of Historic Places in November 1977.

In late 1981, IWI sold the building for $500,000 to an investment group in Woodland Hills. In 1982, the new ownership group extensively renovated the building at a cost of $1.3 million. Architect David Osborne finalized the plans for the work. The renovation included the following elements:

- An addition variously stated to be 2,800, 5,000, or 7,000 square feet, extending the second floor north to Buena Vista Street;
- Creation of eight office suites ranging from 1,087 to 2,620 square feet;
- Demolition of a small building in the rear, which was found to be infested with termites;
- Reinforcement of the main supporting columns which were found to stand on unreinforced beach rocks.
- Enclosure of the bell tower at the building's southeast corner; and
- Removal of a large concrete slab laid in front of the hospital in 1906;
- Replacement of roof tiles with the exception of the bell tower where the original tiles were retained.

The renovated building was opened for leasing in February 1983.

== See also ==
- City of Ventura Historic Landmarks and Districts
- National Register of Historic Places listings in Ventura County, California
- Reportedly haunted locations in California
