= Judge Whaley =

Judge Whaley may refer to:

- Henry H. Whaley (c. 1818–after 1888), associate judge of the Court of Sessions for San Diego County, California
- Richard S. Whaley (1874–1951), judge of the United States Court of Claims
- Robert H. Whaley (born 1943), judge of the United States District Court for the Eastern District of Washington
