= 126 =

126 may refer to:

- 126 (number), the natural number following 125 and preceding 127
- AD 126, a year in the 2nd century AD
- 126 BC, a year in the 2nd century BC
- 126 film, a cartridge-based film format used in still photography
- 126 (New Jersey bus), a New Jersey Transit bus route
- 126 Artist-run Gallery, an artist-run space located in Galway City, Ireland
- Oregon Route 126, a state highway in Oregon
- Interstate 126 in South Carolina
- 126 Velleda, a main-belt asteroid
- Fiat 126, a city car
- 126.com, a Chinese email service operated by NetEase

== See also ==
- 126th (disambiguation)
- 12/6 (disambiguation)
- Unbihexium, a hypothetical chemical element with atomic number 126
