= Cephas L. Bard =

American doctor and pioneer (1843–1902)

Cephas Bard
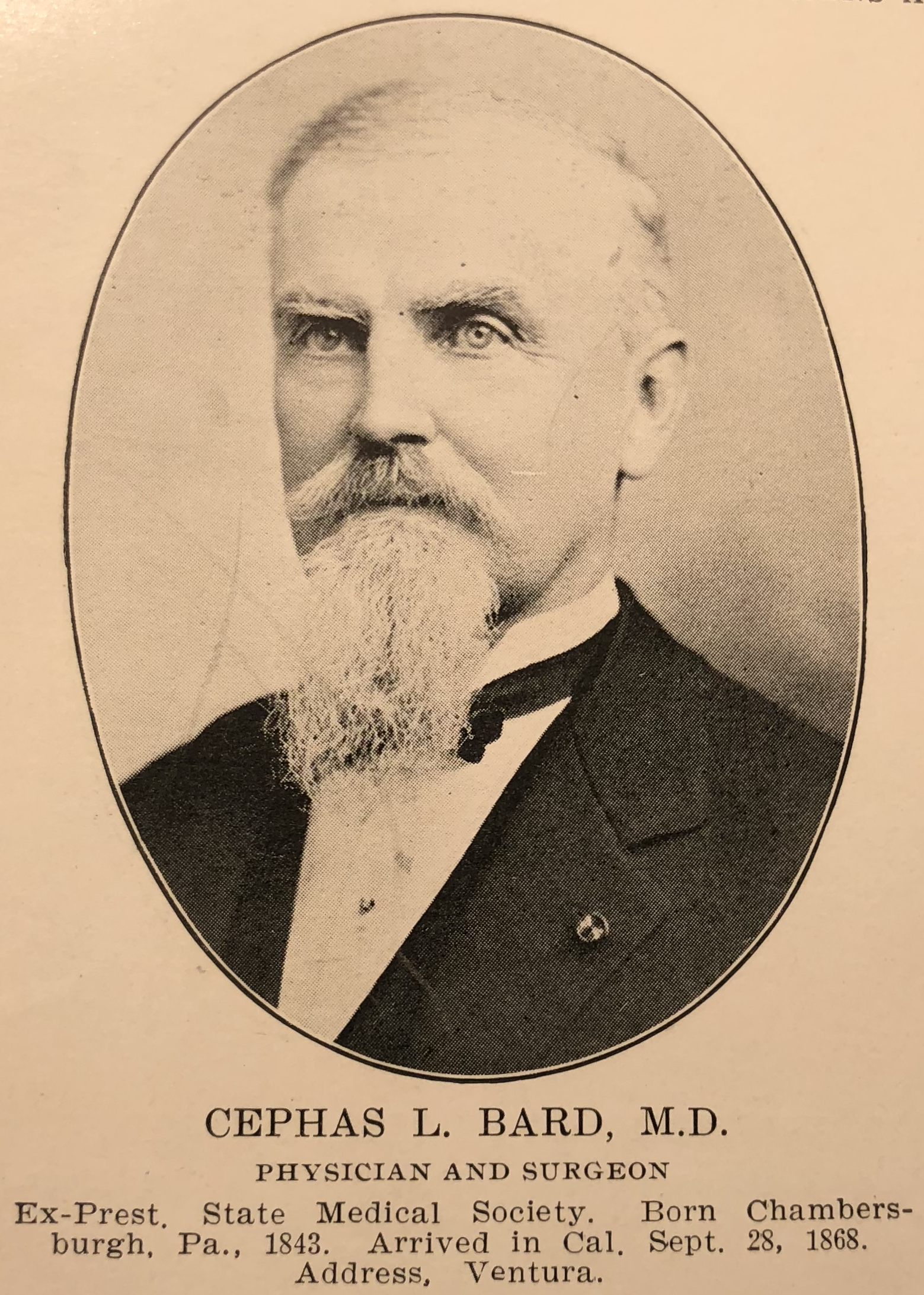
- Born: April 7, 1843; Chambersburg, Pennsylvania, U.S.
- Died: April 20, 1902 (aged 59); Ventura, California, U.S.
- Occupation: Medical doctor

Cephas Little Bard (April 7, 1843 – April 20, 1902) was a medical doctor and pioneer in Ventura, California, United States. After medical studies in Pennsylvania and service in the American Civil War, Bard moved to Ventura in 1868 and practiced medicine there for more than 30 years. He was also a collector of historical artifacts, a founder of the Ventura County Pioneers, and the leading force behind the construction of the Elizabeth Bard Memorial Hospital.

== Early years ==
Bard was born in 1843 in Chambersburg, Pennsylvania. He attended the Chambersburg Academy and then studied medicine at the office of Dr. A. H. Senseny.

In August 1862, during the American Civil War, Bard joined the Union Army, serving with Company A of the 126th Regiment of Pennsylvania Volunteers. He fought at the Second Battle of Bull Run and at the Battles of Antietam, Fredericksburg, and Chancellorsville.

During the latter part of the war, Bard attended Jefferson Medical College in Philadelphia. He became an assistant surgeon with the Pennsylvania Volunteers and served at the front until the war's end. After the war, Bard returned to Chambersburg and began practicing medicine.

== Medical practice in Ventura ==
In 1868, Bard moved to Ventura, California, where he was the first American physician. He also served as the Ventura County Coroner, the Ventura County Physician and Surgeon, and president of the Ventura County Medical Society. He also served one term as president of the California State Medical Society.

In 1871, Bard married Clara Gerberding of San Francisco. They had two children, Mary Blanche and Albert Marius.

== Ventura County Pioneers ==
Bard was also a collector of historical artifacts. He served the Chumash people as well as the Spanish and American residents of the county, and he sometimes received curios and historic trinkets in payment for his medical services. As his historic collection became known, others in the county also donated their artifacts to him. His collection became the initial nucleus of the Ventura Pioneer Museum, now the Museum of Ventura County. Bard was also the founder and president of the Ventura County Pioneers, later the Ventura Historical Society.

== Bard Hospital and death ==
It was Bard's ambition to build a modern hospital in Ventura. For years, he studied and planned every detail of the building. Between 1900 and 1901, Bard built the Elizabeth Bard Memorial Hospital, a memorial to his mother, with financial backing from his brother, Thomas R. Bard. The hospital opened on January 1, 1901.

In the fall of 1901, Bard fell seriously ill with colon cancer. When the Bard Hospital opened, Bard was its first patient. He spent his final months as a patient and died there on April 20, 1902. Having already been the first person admitted to the hospital, he was also the first to die there. Flags were lowered to half-staff throughout Ventura County, and bells were tolled, following his death. Bard's remains were incinerated at Rosedale Cemetery in Los Angeles in accordance with his wishes, following a funeral ceremony in Ventura.

In April 1903, the Elizabeth Bard Memorial Hospital unveiled a bronze bust of Bard and placed an urn containing Bard's ashes in the hospital as part of the ceremony. The bust is now on permanent display in the vestibule of the Museum of Ventura County.
