= 1900 United States Senate special election in California =

- February 6, 1900

Majority vote of each house needed to win
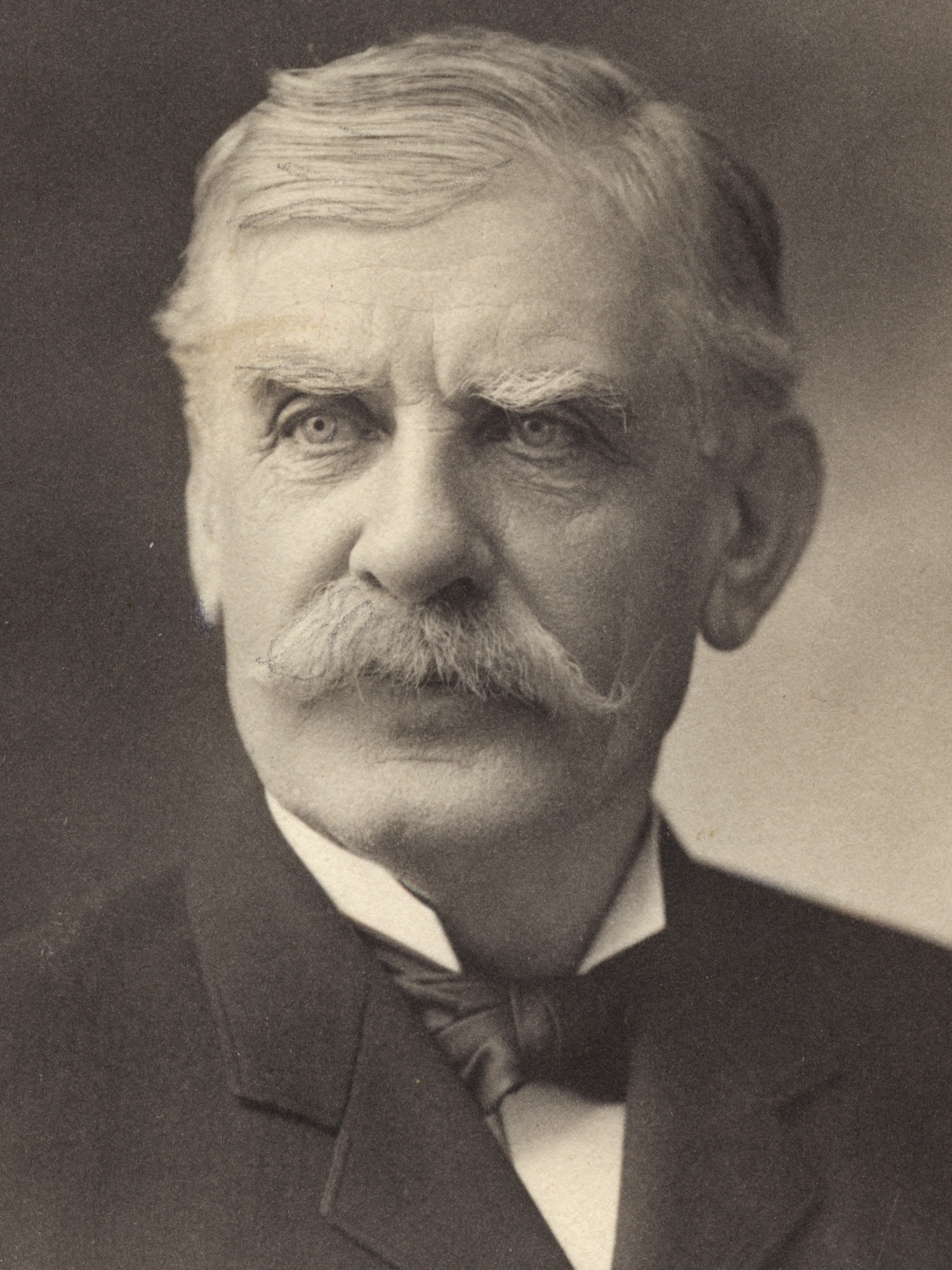

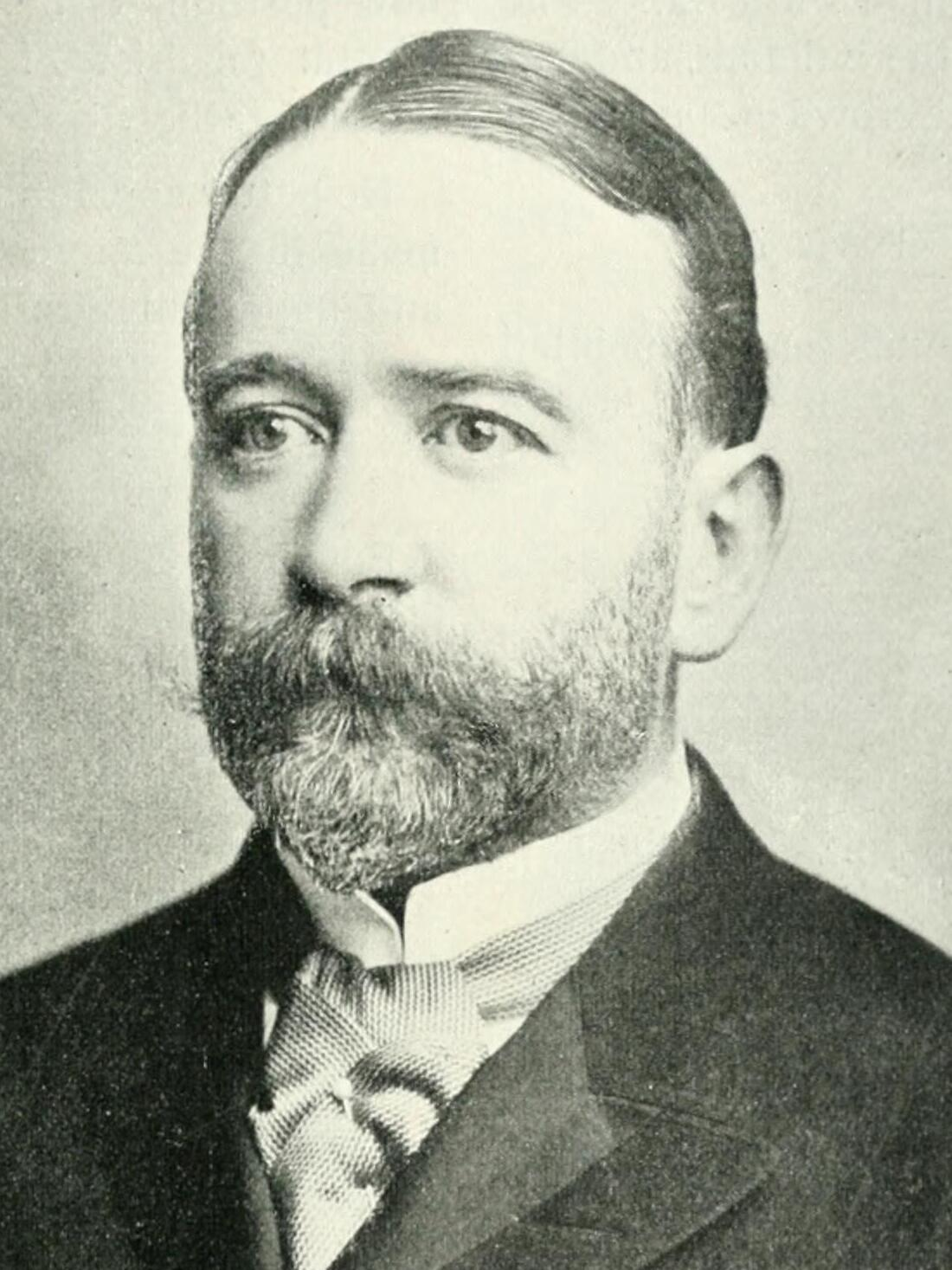
Nominee	Thomas R. Bard	James D. Phelan
Party	Republican	Democratic
Senate	26	10
Percentage	72.22%	27.78%
House	59	20
Percentage	73.75%	25.00%
Senator before election
None
(Legislature failed to elect)
Elected Senator
Thomas R. Bard
Republican

The 1900 United States Senate special election in California was held on February 6, 1900, by the California State Legislature to elect a U.S. senator (Class 1) to represent the State of California in the United States Senate. Legislators had previously attempted to elect a Senator in 1899, but could not reach a majority for a single candidate. Republican oil executive Thomas R. Bard was elected over Democratic San Francisco Mayor James D. Phelan.

== Results ==
Election in the Senate
Party	Candidate	Votes	%
Republican	Thomas R. Bard	26	72.22%
Democratic	James D. Phelan	10	27.78%
Total votes		36	100.00%

Election in the Assembly
Party	Candidate	Votes	%
Republican	Thomas R. Bard	59	73.75%
Democratic	James D. Phelan	20	25.00%
Democratic	Stephen M. White	1	1.25%
Total votes		80	100.00%

== 1899 United States Senate election in California ==
1899 United States Senate election in California
- January 10, 1899 (first ballot)

Majority vote of both houses needed to win
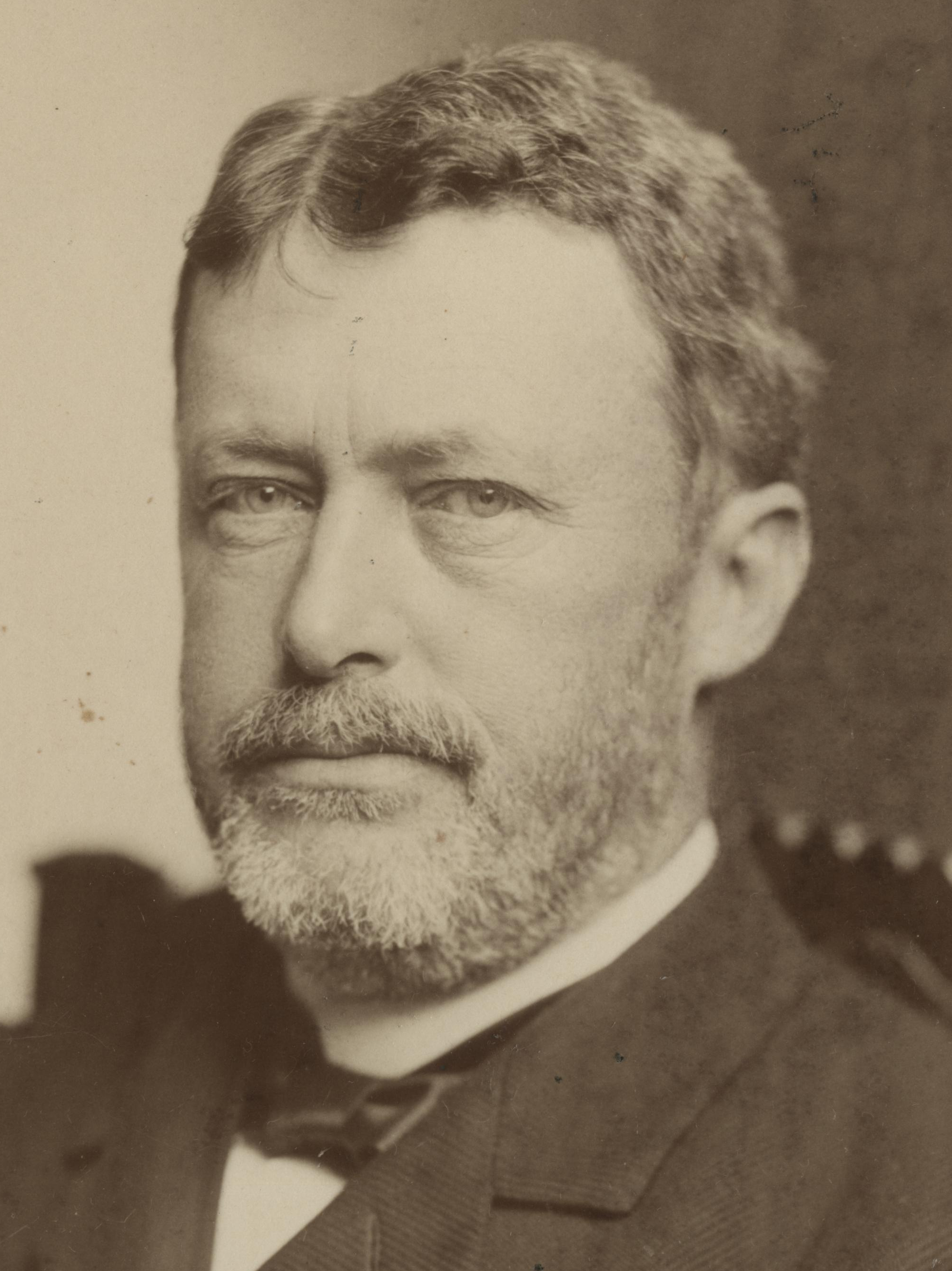

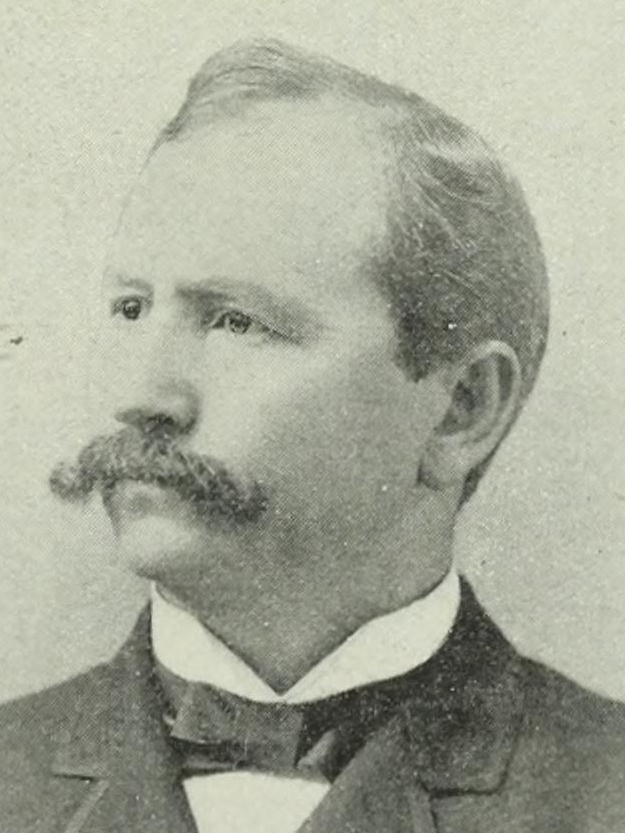

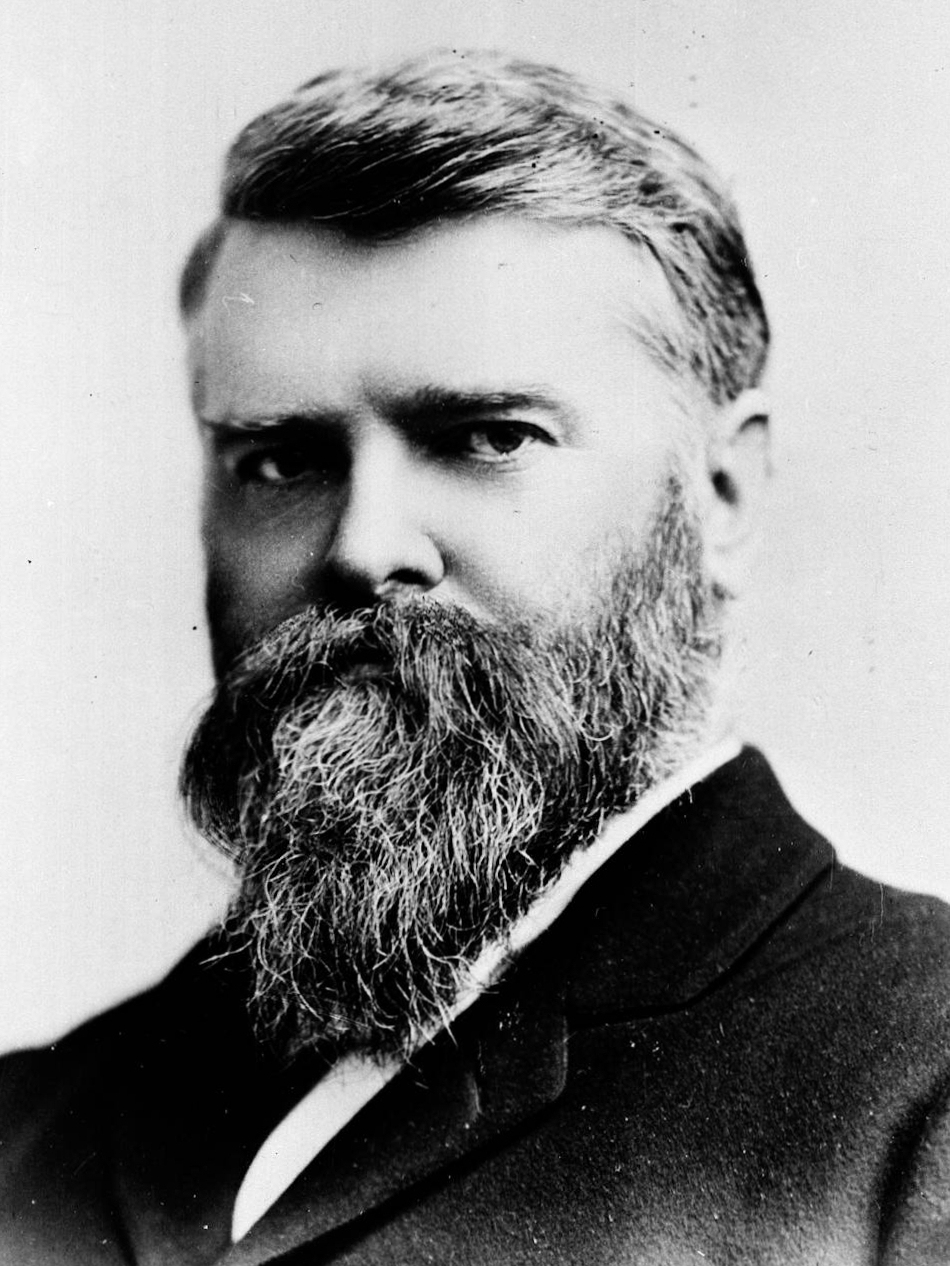

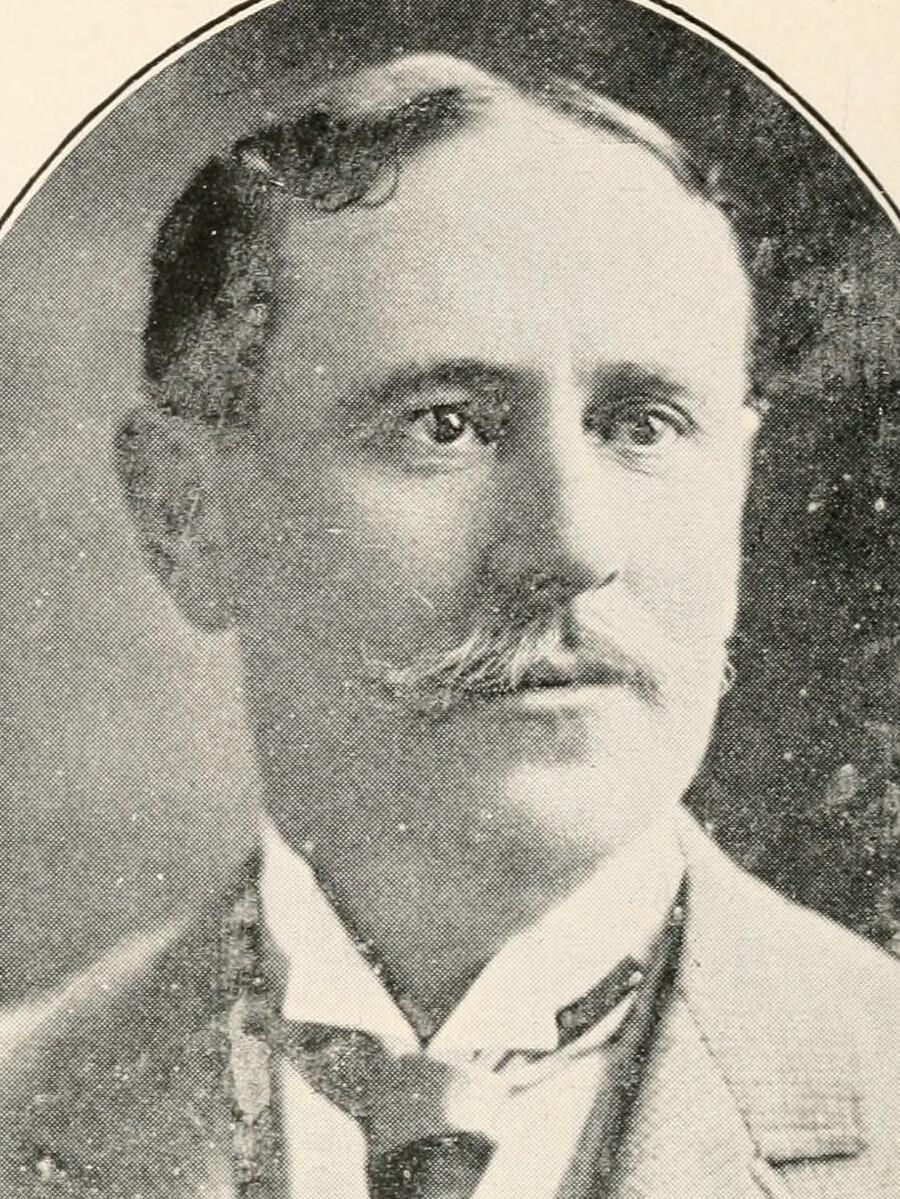

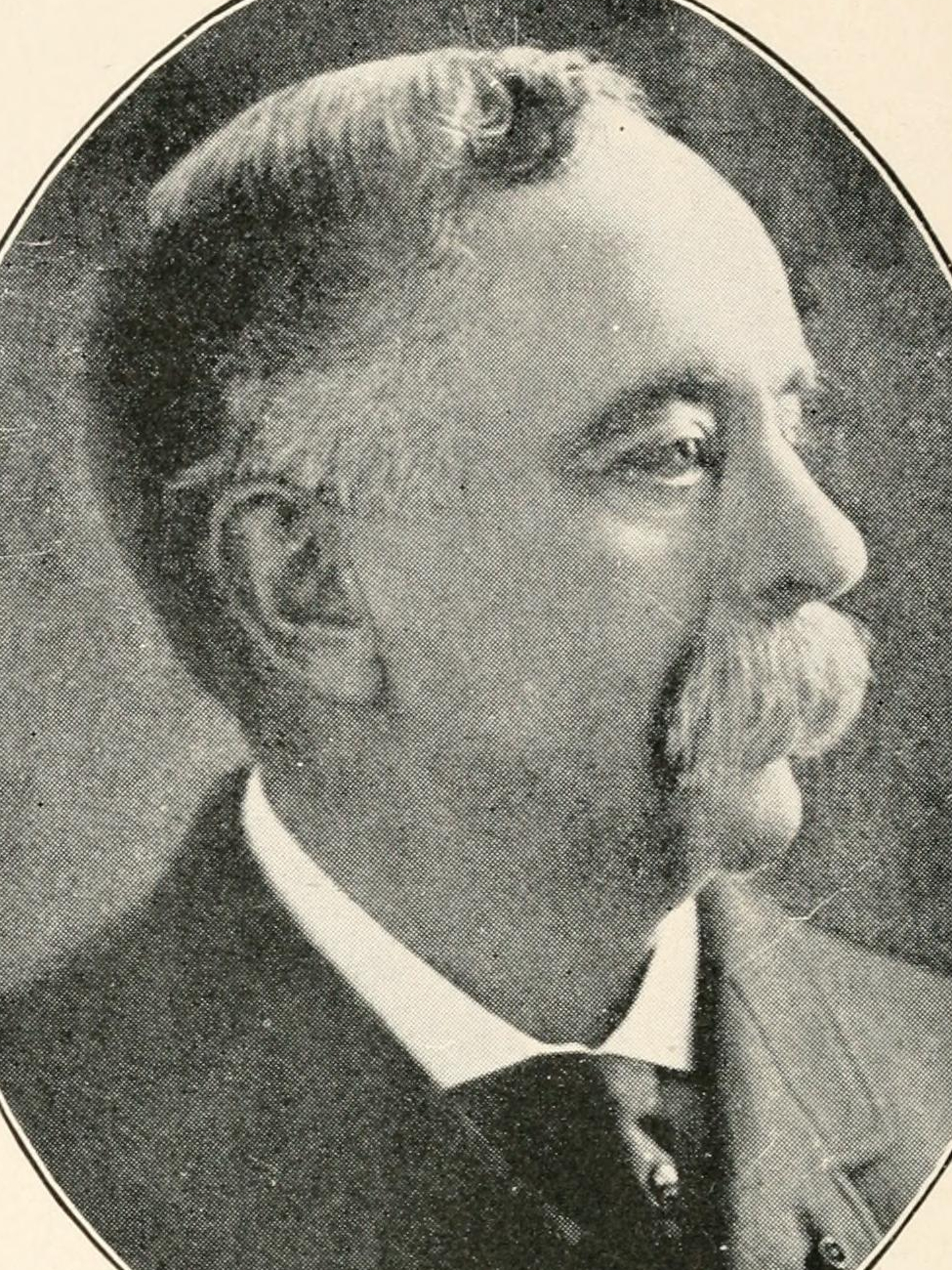
Nominee	Ulysses S. Grant Jr.	Daniel M. Burns	Stephen M. White
Party	Republican	Republican	Democratic
Joint session	26	24	24
Percentage	23.85%	22.02%	22.02%
Nominee	Robert N. Bulla	W. H. L. Barnes
Party	Republican	Republican
Joint session	11	9
Percentage	10.09%	8.26%
Senator before election
Stephen M. White
Democratic
Elected Senator
None
(Legislature failed to elect)

The 1899 United States Senate election in California was held throughout 1899, with the first ballot cast on January 10, 1899, by the California State Legislature to elect a U.S. Senator (Class 1) to represent the State of California in the United States Senate. Legislators could not reach a majority for a single candidate, and the seat remained vacant for a year.

Newly elected Assembly speaker Howard E. Wright, a supporter of Burns, was implicated in a vote buying scheme for this election and resigned his office.

A few days before the first ballot, The Wasp wrote:

The list of candidates, outside Colonel Burns, leaves no room to fear a long protracted dead-lock. "Compromise material" is strong. Mr. Grant would probably make a much more capable Senator than his opponents will admit. It is well to remember that his illustrious father did not have any celebrity till somewhat late in life. George A. Knight appears to us an ideal compromise candidate. He has magnetic qualities, is eloquent, in the vigor of life and a universally popular man. He is a most loyal party man and in the years he has worked for Republican success has never accepted a dollar of party money. He is free from corporate entanglements and should prove a strong candidate if the ballots begin to drag out to any length. Judge Morrow is also a most admirable candidate but of all "the field," so to speak, Knight displays the speediest qualities. The State and the party could make no mistake in accepting him as a final solution of the Senatorial problem.

— The Wasp, January 7, 1899

== Results ==
Election in the Legislature (joint session)
Party	Candidate	Votes	%
Republican	Ulysses S. Grant Jr.	26	23.85%
Republican	Daniel M. Burns	24	22.02%
Democratic	Stephen M. White	24	22.02%
Republican	Robert N. Bulla	11	10.09%
Republican	W. H. L. Barnes	9	8.26%
	Scattering	15	13.76%
Total votes		109	100.00%
