= Jacob C. Bogart =

American politician (1820–1876)

President of the San Diego Board of Trustees (informal Mayor)
- In office 1859–1860
- Born: January 1, 1820; New Jersey, USA
- Died: August 15, 1876 (aged 56)
- Occupations: Ship captain, Politician
- Years active: 1834–1876

Jacob C. Bogart (c. 1820 – August 15, 1876) was an American ship captain and Democratic politician from San Diego, California.

Jacob Bogart was born about 1820 in New Jersey. Captain J. C. Bogart first visited San Diego in 1834 on the ship Black Warrior. He then served as an agent for the Pacific Mail Steamship Company at La Playa area of San Diego. He says of his first visit:

In 1834 it was good to see the hills about San Diego. Wild oats grew upon them to a height which reached above the head of a man on horseback. Cattle were abundant and rolling in fat. Whenever any of the crew of the whaler Black Warrior wished to use a horse, the animal was furnished by the native Californians for a whole day for a dollar. It made no difference if the rider pressed the horse to death, so he packed the saddle back. Horses were too plentiful to be a matter of any consequence.

After a steady stream of people started to travel to San Francisco from Panama during the California Gold Rush, a coaling station was set up in San Diego.

Bogart was stationed in San Diego where he was in charge of a coak hulk Clarissa Andrews that was anchored in San Diego Bay. Lt. George Derby of the U.S. Topographical Engineers reported that in 1853 he saw "two crazy old hulks riding at anchor", one of them the Clarissa Andrews, filled with coal for the Pacific Mail Steamship Co., "wherein dwells Captain Bogart, like a second Robinson Crusoe".

In 1852 Bogart planted a field of barley near La Playa, but the grain never ripened as the antelopes (which were in San Diego back then) and jack rabbits destroyed it all.

After settling in San Diego for a few years, Bogart became active in politics. Bogart was elected to the San Diego County Board of Supervisors, serving during 1858–1861.

Bogart was appointed president for the San Diego city board of trustees (informally called "mayor") during 1859–1860.

Bogart was elected State Senator (Democratic) serving during 1862–1863.

Preceded by Thomas Whaley	President of the San Diego Board of Trustees; 1859–1860	Succeeded by Rufus B. Tebbetts
