= 126th =

126th may refer to:

== Military units ==
- 126th Air Refueling Squadron, a unit of the Wisconsin Air National Guard that flies the KC-135R Stratotanker
- 126th Air Refueling Wing, an Illinois Air National Guard air refueling wing located at Scott Air Force Base, Illinois
- 126th Baluchistan Infantry, a regiment of the British Indian Army
- 126th Battalion (Peel), CEF, a unit in the Canadian Expeditionary Force during the First World War
- 126th Delaware General Assembly, a meeting of the Delaware Senate and the Delaware House of Representatives
- 126th Division (People's Republic of China), a division deployed by the People's Republic of China
- 126th (East Lancashire) Brigade, an infantry brigade of the British Army
- 126th Infantry Regiment (United States), a United States military unit of the Michigan Army National Guard
- 126th Ohio Infantry Regiment, an infantry regiment in the Union Army during the American Civil War
- 126th Pennsylvania Infantry Regiment, an infantry regiment of the Union Army of the American Civil War
- 126th Regiment of Foot, an infantry regiment of the British Army, created in 1794 and disbanded in 1796

== Other uses ==
- 126th meridian east, a line of longitude 126° east of Greenwich
- 126th meridian west, a line of longitude 126° west of Greenwich
- 126th Ohio General Assembly, the legislative body of the state of Ohio in the years 2005 and 2006
- Ohio House of Representatives membership, 126th General Assembly, in session in 2005 and 2006

== See also ==
- 126 (number)
- AD 126, the year 126 (CXXVI) of the Julian calendar
- 126 BC
