= Berylwood =

Historic house in California, United States

Coordinates: 34°9′28″N 119°11′48″W

- U.S. National Register of Historic Places
- U.S. Historic district
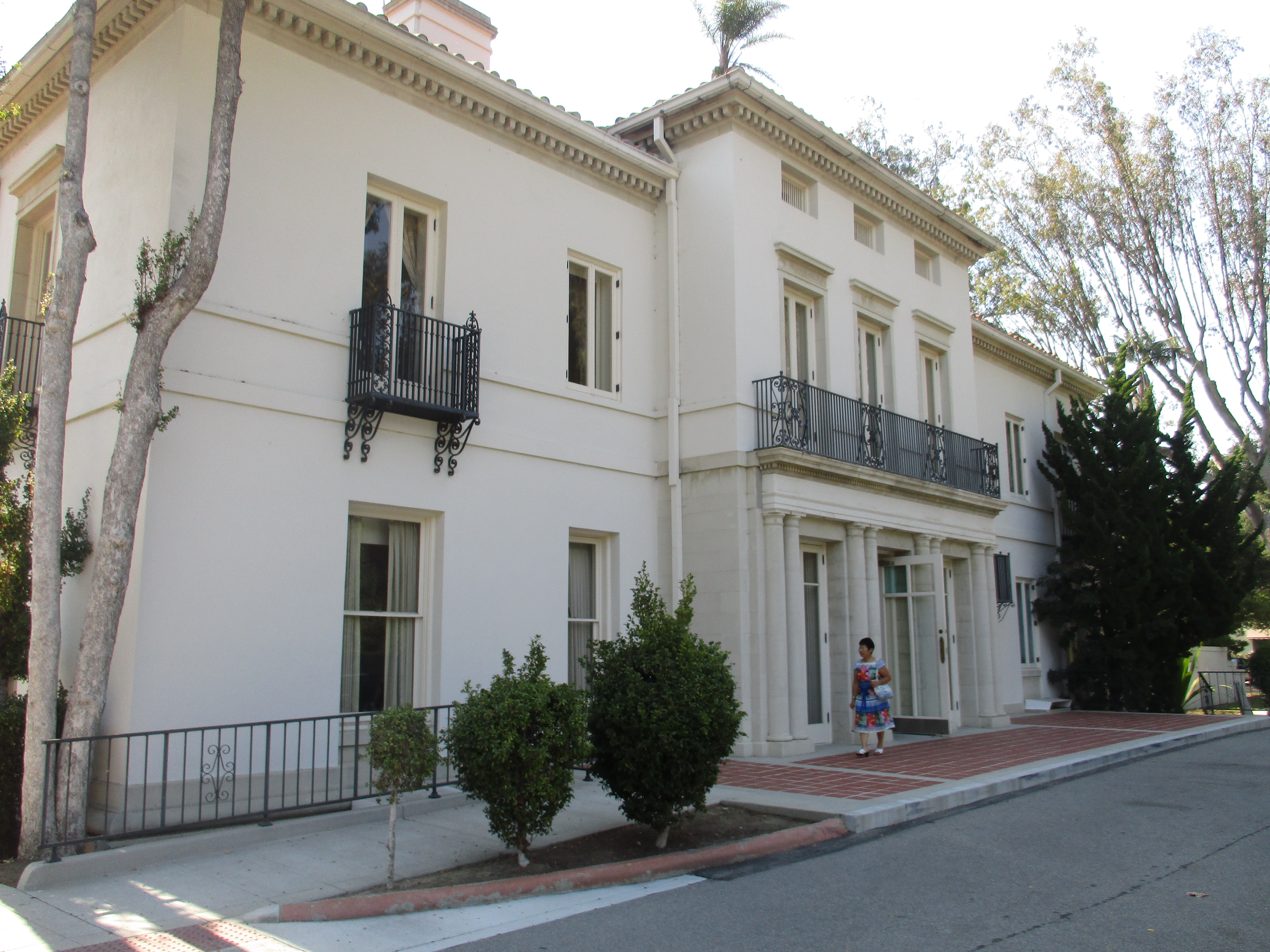
- Bard Mansion

- Location within California Location within the United States
- Location: Ventura Rd., Port Hueneme, California
- Area: 2 acres (0.81 ha)
- Built: 1910
- Built by: Hunt, Myron
- NRHP reference No.: 77000360
- Added to NRHP: September 15, 1977

Berylwood (also known as the Thomas R. Bard Estate) was the home of Thomas R. Bard, who was influential in the formation of Ventura County as a landowner, entrepreneur, and politician. Located in Port Hueneme, California within Naval Base Ventura County, the estate was listed on the National Register of Historic Places in 1977. The listing included six contributing buildings, two other contributing structures, and two contributing sites.

The Bard Mansion was designed by Myron Hunt for the Bard family's 62-acre (250,000 m2) estate. The property was leased by the Navy during World War II and acquired by the government in 1951. The mansion is used as a conference center.

== See also ==
- National Register of Historic Places listings in Ventura County, California
- Ventura County Historic Landmarks & Points of Interest
