= Thomas R. Bard =

American politician

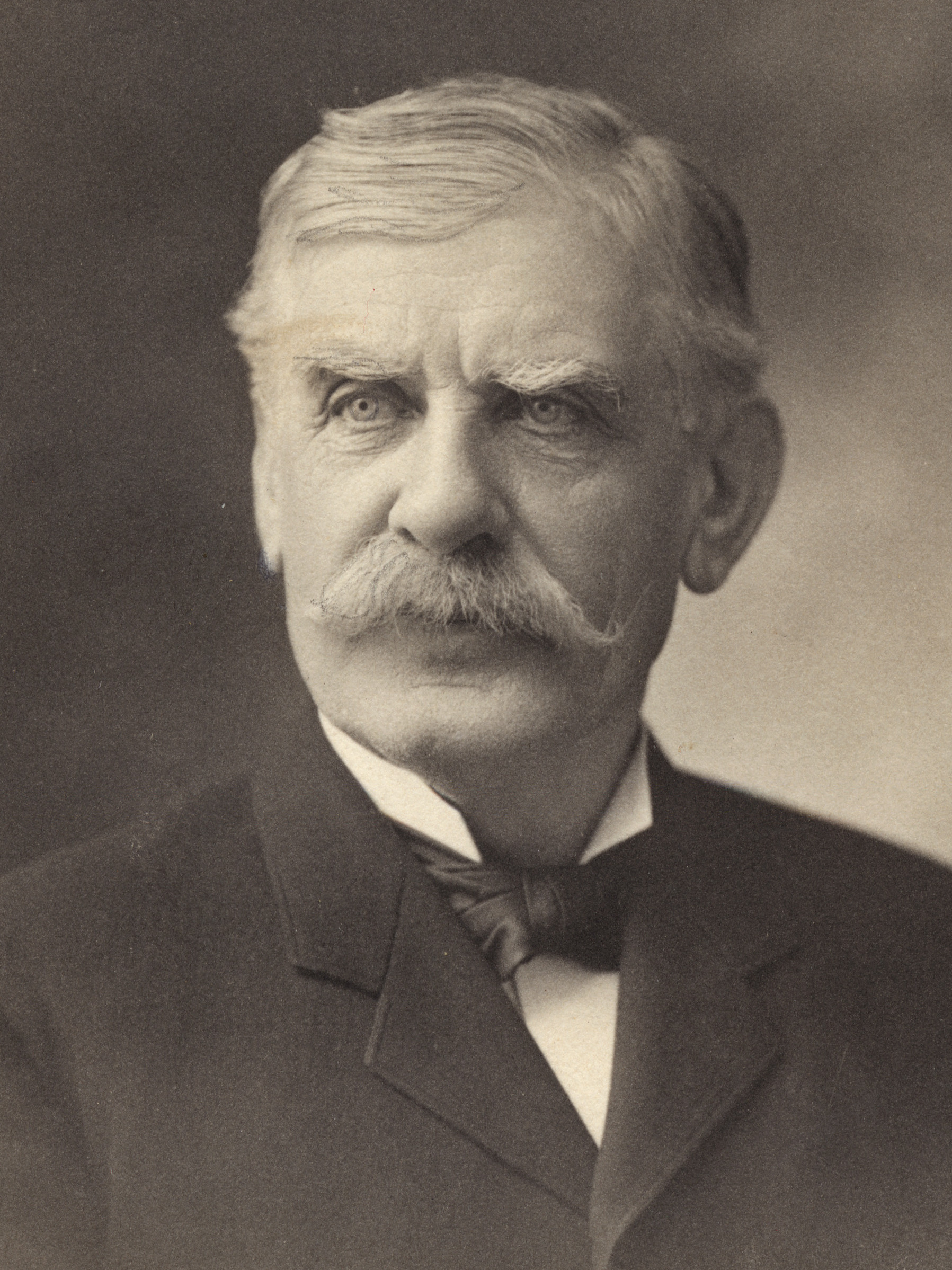
- Bard c. 1900

United States Senator from California
- In office February 7, 1900 – March 3, 1905
- Preceded by: Stephen M. White
- Succeeded by: Frank P. Flint

Personal details
- Born: December 8, 1841 Chambersburg, Pennsylvania, U.S.
- Died: March 5, 1915 (aged 73) Port Hueneme, California, U.S.
- Party: Republican

Military service
- Branch/service: Union Army
- Battles/wars: American Civil War

Thomas Robert Bard (December 8, 1841 – March 5, 1915) was an American politician and businessman who was a United States Senator from California from 1900 to 1905 as a Republican. He assisted in the organization of Ventura County, California, and is known as the "Father of Port Hueneme" for his efforts in building and expanding the city, as well as the first and only deep water port in the area. He was a co-founder of the Unocal petroleum company.

== Early life ==
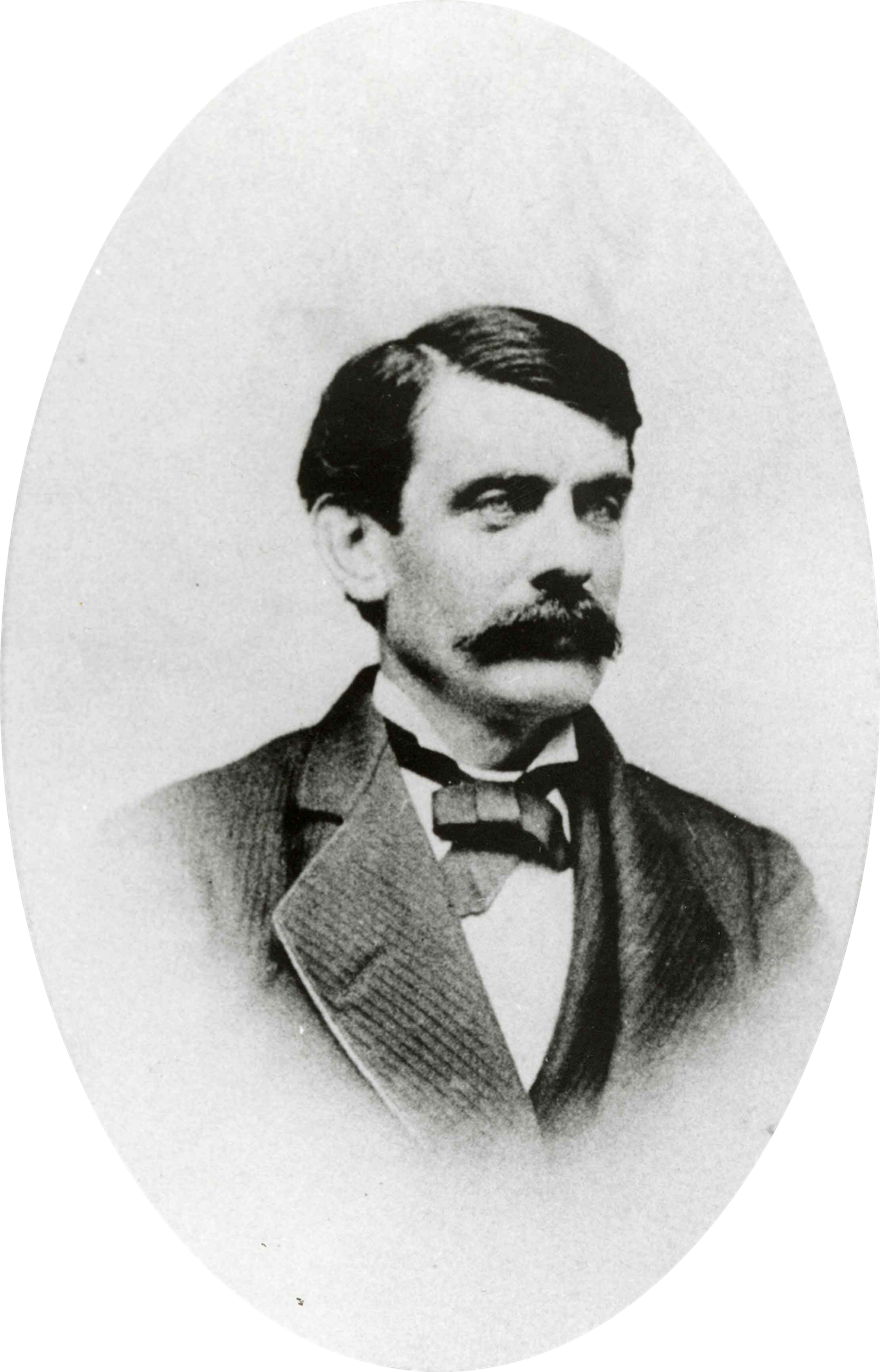
Bard in 1876

Born in Chambersburg, Pennsylvania, on December 8, 1841, Bard attended the common schools, and graduated from the Chambersburg Academy in 1858. He studied law in school, and before his graduation, he secured a job with Pennsylvania Railroad. Later, he became an assistant to the superintendent of the Cumberland Valley Railroad. Other business ventures included the grain business in Hagerstown, Maryland. During the early part of the Civil War, Bard served as a volunteer Union scout during the invasions of Maryland and Pennsylvania by the Confederates.

In 1865, Bard arrived in Ventura County, California, to develop his uncle Thomas A. Scott's properties in Ojai. In 1867, Bard would become the first person in California to produce oil from a drilled well. The official Congressional Directory for 1903 notes that Bard "has engaged in wharving and warehousing, banking, petroleum mining, sheep grazing, and dealing in real estate".

== Political career ==
Thomas R. Bard moved to Ventura County, California, in 1864 and served as a member of the board of supervisors of Santa Barbara County from 1868 to 1873. In 1871, he was appointed as a commissioner to organize Ventura County. During this time, he purchased and subdivided Rancho El Rio de Santa Clara o la Colonia and laid out the plans for Port Hueneme, California, the future site of his Berylwood estate.

Bard was the California delegate to the 1884 Republican National Convention, and later served as the director of the California state board of agriculture from 1886 to 1887. In 1887, Bard became a founding board member of Occidental College. Elected as a Republican to the United States Senate on February 6, 1900, to fill a vacancy created by the death of Senator Stephen M. White, he served until March 3, 1905. Bard was unsuccessful in his 1904 reelection bid. During his term Bard served as the chairman of the Committee of Fisheries (for the Fifty-seventh Congress) and served on the Committee on irrigation (for the Fifty-eighth Congress). One of Thomas R. Bard's notable acts during his time in office was to appoint George S. Patton to West Point.

== Family and later life ==
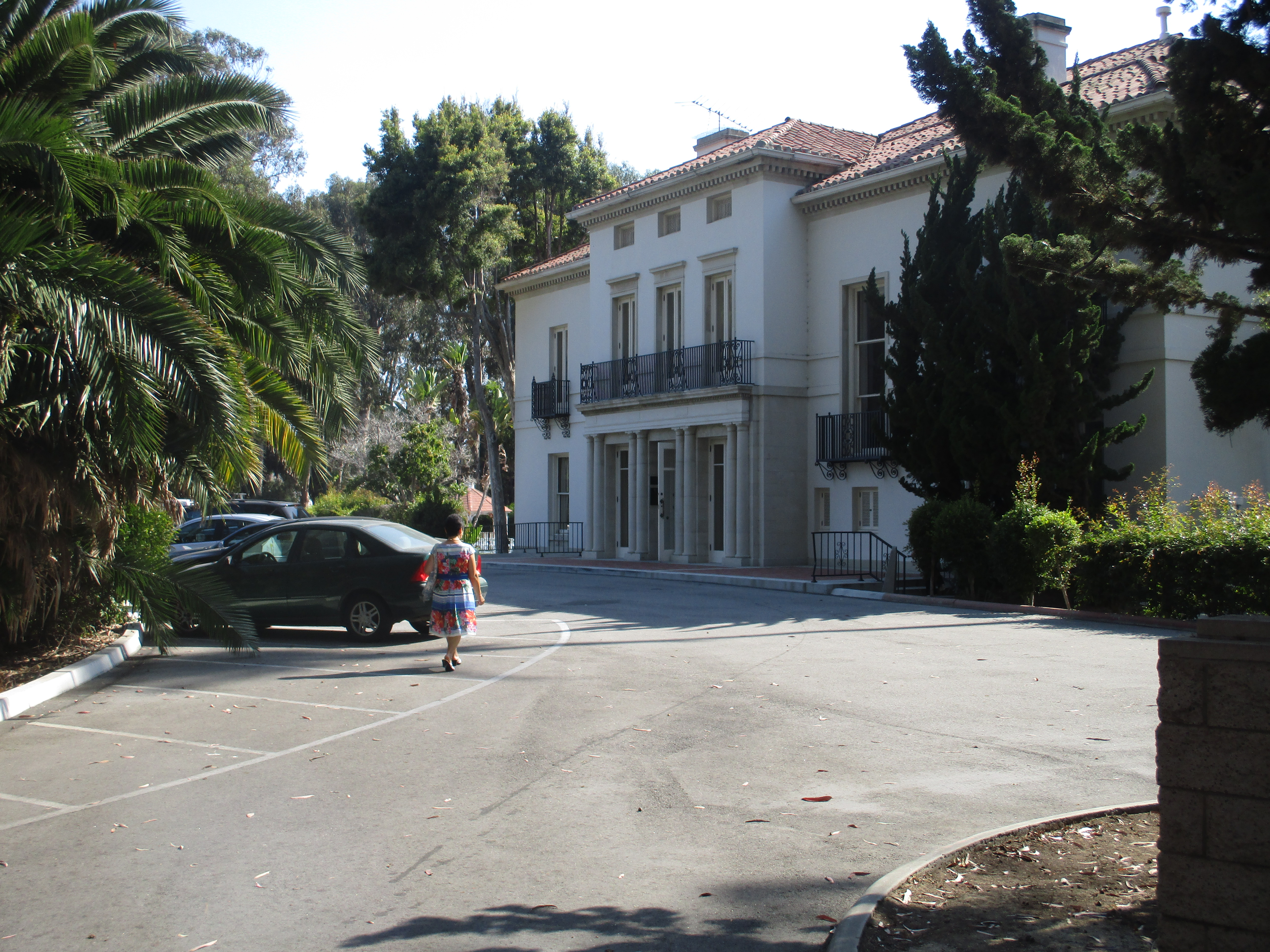
Contemporary photo of Bard Mansion on his Berylwood estate.

Thomas R. Bard became a successful business man, and held profitable interests in several oil companies. Thomas R. Bard and his brother, Dr. Cephas Little Bard, established the Elizabeth Bard Memorial Hospital in Ventura as a memorial to their mother. His son, Archibald Philip Bard, became a noted physiologist and the dean of Johns Hopkins Medical School.

He died at his Berylwood home in Port Hueneme, California, on March 5, 1915, and was interred in the family cemetery on his estate. His remains were moved to Ivy Lawn Cemetery in Ventura, California, by the military.

== See also ==
- Bardsdale, California
- Bard, California
- R. G. Surdam

U.S. Senate
Preceded by Stephen M. White	U.S. senator (Class 1) from California; 1900–1905; Served alongside: George C. Perkins	Succeeded by Frank P. Flint
