= Thomas Whaley =

Early settler of San Diego, California, US (1823–1860)

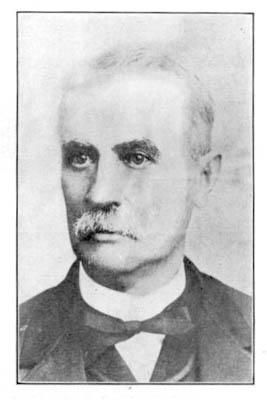
- Born: October 5, 1823; New York City, U.S.
- Died: December 14, 1890 (aged 67); San Diego, California, US
- Resting place: Mount Hope Cemetery, San Diego
- Occupation: Settler

Thomas Whaley (October 5, 1823 – December 14, 1890) was an early settler of San Diego, California. The residence he built there in 1857 is now a public museum called Whaley House.

== Biography ==
Whaley was born in Manhattan, New York City, 1823 to Thomas Alexander Whaley Sr. and Rachel Pye. His father died in 1832 and his will said Thomas should receive a liberal education.

Whaley left for California during the California gold rush, and ending up working in San Francisco stores. This became successful, but was lost after an arson fire in 1851. He was advised to go to San Diego, so he and Lewis Franklin sailed there in 1851 and opened a store called Tienda California. He studied Spanish so he could sell to the Kumeyaay native people. The next year Franklin sold out to Whaley, and Whaley had a succession of other partners.

Whaley married Anna Eloise DeLaunay in 1853 in New York. She was born March 31, 1832, in New York City to a French family. They had six children, including Anna Amelia, George Hay Ringgold, Violet Eloise, and Corinne Lillian.

Whaley was appointed president of the San Diego board of trustees (informally called "mayor") during 1858–1859. Whaley was a Whig, though the position was officially non-partisan.

In 1857, Thomas Whaley built a house in San Diego, in the area now referred to as Old Town. It was the first brick house in San Diego. The bricks were made at Whaley's kiln in Old Town, and the walls were finished with plaster made from ground seashells. The one-story wing served as the county courthouse during 1869–1870, with upstairs rooms used as San Diego's first commercial theater and meeting rooms for the County Board of Supervisors and record storage. At times, part of the downstairs was a store. The Whaley Family lived in the home off and on until 1885, when they moved into a new home in New Town (now Downtown) San Diego. The brick house in Old Town is now a museum, Whaley House, at 2482 San Diego Avenue. It is thought by some to be haunted.

Thomas Whaley died at his New Town residence on December 14, 1890, aged 67. His wife Anna died at the Old Town residence on February 24, 1913, aged 80. Thomas and Anna are buried in a family plot at the nearby Mount Hope Cemetery.

According to the Travel Channel's "America's Most Haunted" TV show, the house was featured as the number one most haunted house in the United States.

== See also ==
- Whaley House

== External links and further reading ==
- "San Diego Paranormal Research Project"
- "The Whaley House", The Journal of San Diego History 6:2 (April 1960) by June A. Strudwick
- San Diego Historical Society biography
- Thomas Whaley House
- Consignments to El Dorado: A Record of the Voyage of the Sutton (1972) ISBN 0-682-47444-4, has Whaley's journal during his voyage from New York to San Francisco in 1849.
- "Thomas Whaley." History, San Diego State University thesis, 1963, by Robert W. Haven.

Preceded by Henry H. Whaley	President of the San Diego Board of Trustees; 1858–1859	Succeeded by Jacob C. Bogart
