= 12/6 =

12/6 may refer to:

- December 6 (month-day date notation)
- June 12 (day-month date notation)
- 12 shillings and 6 pence in UK predecimal currency

== See also ==
- 126 (disambiguation)
