= 126th Division =

In military terms, 126th Division or 126th Infantry Division may refer to:

- 126th Division (People's Republic of China)
- 126th Infantry Division (Wehrmacht), Germany
- 126th Division (Imperial Japanese Army)
- 126th Guards Rifle Division, Soviet Union
- 126th Machine Gun Artillery Division, Russia/Soviet Union
- 126th Rifle Division, Soviet Union

== See also ==
- List of military divisions by number
- 126th Brigade (disambiguation)
- 126th Regiment (disambiguation)
- 126th Squadron (disambiguation)
- 126th (disambiguation)
