= Milton Blickensderfer =

American soldier

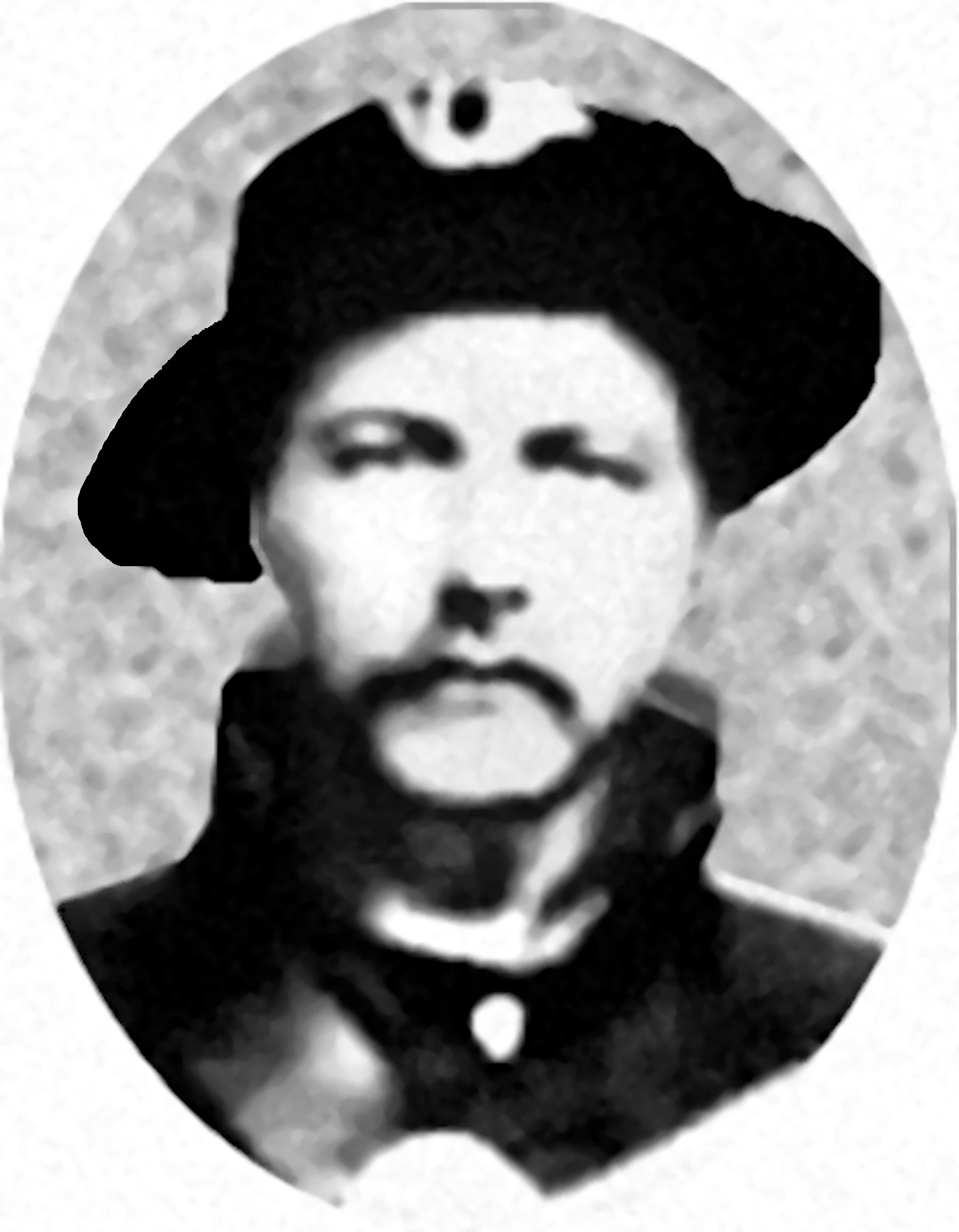
- Corporal Milton Blickensderfer
- Born: May 20, 1835; Lancaster, Pennsylvania
- Died: May 17, 1916 (aged 80)
- Burial place: Sugar Creek, Ohio
- Military career
- Allegiance: United States of America
- Branch: United States Army
- Rank: Corporal
- Unit: 126th Regiment Ohio Volunteer Infantry - Company E
- Awards: Medal of Honor

Corporal Milton Blickensderfer (May 20, 1835 to May 17, 1916) was an American soldier who fought in the American Civil War. Blickensderfer received the country's highest award for bravery during combat, the Medal of Honor, for his action at Petersburg, Virginia on 3 April 1865. He was honored with the award on 10 May 1865.

== Biography ==
Blickensderfer was born in Lancaster, Pennsylvania. Before the war, he resided in Tuscarawas county with his wife, Mary, and three children. He enlisted into the 126th Ohio Infantry in 1862 at Shanesville, Ohio. During the siege of Petersberg, Blickensderfer captured a Confederate battle flag, an act for which he was awarded the Medal of Honor. He died on 17 May 1916 in Tuscarawas County, Ohio and his remains are interred at Sugar Creek, Ohio.

== Medal of Honor citation ==
Capture of flag.

== See also ==
- List of American Civil War Medal of Honor recipients: A–F
