= 126th Brigade =

126th Brigade may refer to:

== Russia ==
- 126th Coastal Defence Brigade, a formation of the Coastal Defense Troops of the Russian Navy

== Serbia ==
- 126th Air Surveillance, Early Warning and Guidance Brigade, a joint tactical unit of Serbian Air Force and Air Defense

== Soviet Union ==
- 126th Tank Brigade

== Ukraine ==
- 126th Territorial Defense Brigade, a unit of the Ukrainian Territorial Defense Forces

== United Kingdom ==
- 126th (East Lancashire) Brigade, a unit of the British Army during the First and Second World Wars

== See also ==
- 126th Division (disambiguation)
- 126th Regiment (disambiguation)
