= Katie Wheeler Library =

Public library in Irvine, California, US

Coordinates: 33.730525°N 117.785424°W

The Katie Wheeler Library is a public library in Irvine, California. The current structure was built on land that belonged to the Irvine family. In 2008, the site was dedicated as a historical landmark.

== History ==
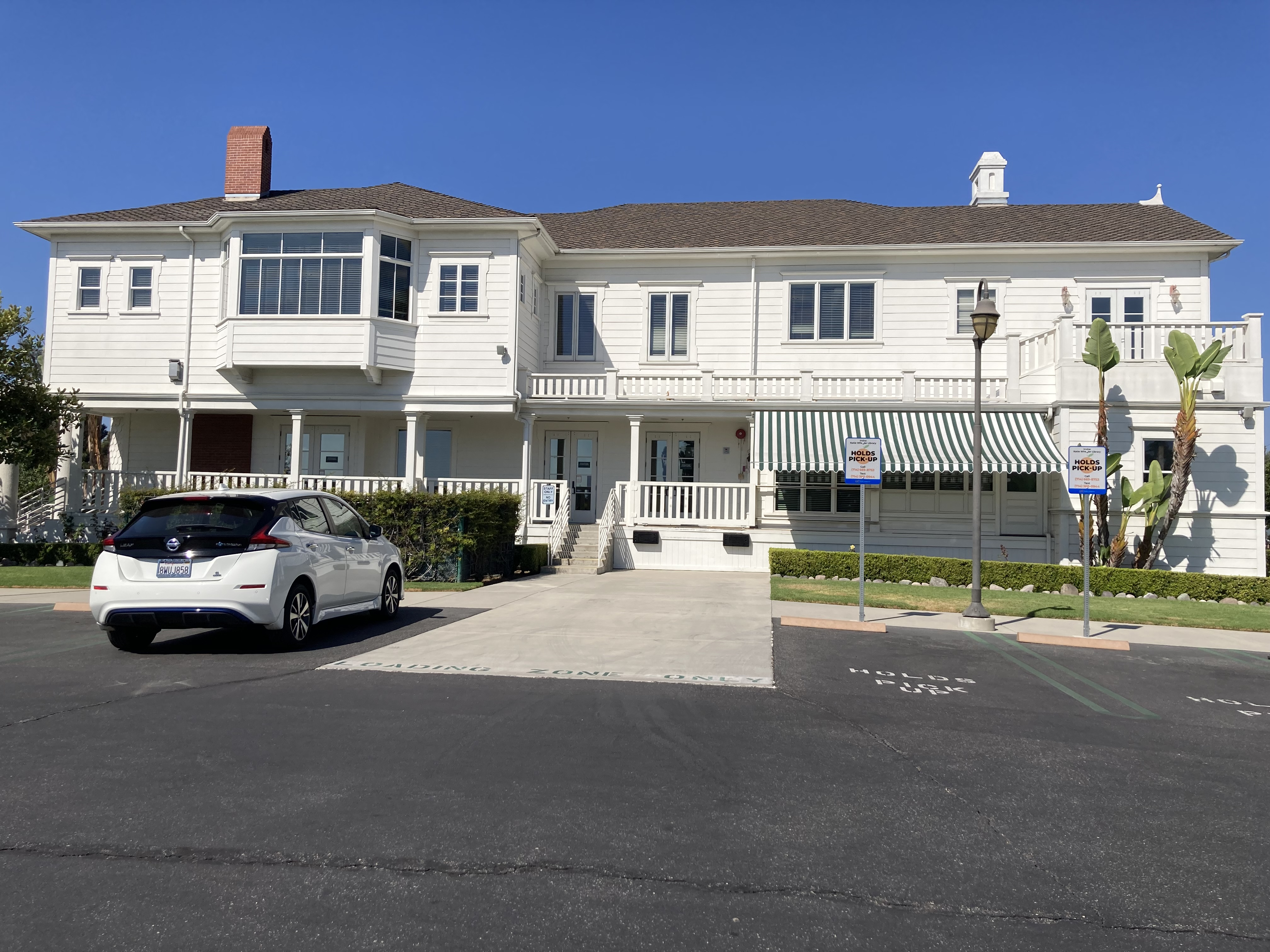
The Katie Wheeler Library

The original structure of the Katie Wheeler Library was constructed in 1876. It was originally a ranch house that would eventually come into control by James Irvine II. Irvine would double the size of the building. After the 1906 San Francisco earthquake, Irvine would relocate his entire family to this spot.

His granddaughter, Kathryn "Katie" Anita Irvine Wheeler, was born in the ranch house in 1920 to Kathryn Helena Irvine and Frank Lillard, and she became the namesake for the library. Wheeler served as the longest-serving director as well as honorary member of the James Irvine Foundation from 1950 until her passing in 2003. The foundation was established to provide grants to various organizations statewide, and it would later donate $1 million to support the library and honor Wheeler's contributions.

In 1965, the original structure burned down and later was demolished. The property that is in use today is a reconstruction using architectural drawings. In 2008, the site opened as the Katie Wheeler Library. It was designated as a historical landmark by OC Parks.

== Reopening ==
The library was set to permanently close by July 2025 after the city of Irvine approved its removal from the Orange County Public Library (OCPL) system while the city developed its own library system, Irvine Public Libraries. After the motion passed, residents formed a petition to protest the closure, which gained over 5,000 signatures as of February 2025.

In January 2026, an agreement for the county to lease the library to the city as a part of Irvine Public Libraries until December 2029 was signed. As of April 2026, the lease agreement remains temporary but subject to renewal.

In March 2026, the library successfully reopened with a ribbon-cutting ceremony.

The library features various events for children, including storytime and play sessions. There is also a used bookstore in the basement managed by Friends of the Katie Wheeler Library.

== Paranormal activity ==
The Katie Wheeler Library is supposedly haunted. It is referred to as "The Mansion," and it is believed that the ghost of Kathryn Helena Irvine haunts the location, having died on the site during childbirth. Consistent reports of ghost activity at 8am and a woman's singing were noted. Other reports say that the ghost of a tall man (believed to be James Irvine) still wanders the property.
