= Reportedly haunted locations in California =

Allegedly haunted sites

The following are reportedly haunted locations in California, in the United States. This list is sorted by county.

== Los Angeles County ==
- The Hollywood Sign in the Hollywood Hills neighborhood of Los Angeles is reported by believers to be haunted by the ghost of actress Peg Entwistle, who committed suicide by jumping off the "H" letter of the sign, out of grief and intoxication.
- The Lincoln Heights Jail in the Lincoln Heights neighborhood of Los Angeles is allegedly haunted by the seven inmates who were beaten by guards on what is known today as Bloody Christmas.
- The Cecil Hotel is said to be the most haunted hotel in the county. The hotel is known for hosting many murders, suicide, and other unnatural deaths. The latest death in the hotel was the death of Canadian student Elisa Lam in 2013.

== Orange County ==
- El Adobe de Capistrano Restaurant in San Juan Capistrano, which comprises the home of Miguel Yorba built in 1797 and the town's Juzgado (court and jail) built in 1812, is reported to house a ghost in former jail cell, now the restaurant's wine cellar. In addition there have been reports of a headless friar in front of the restaurant.
- Black Star Canyon, in the Santa Ana Mountains above Irvine, was the site of an Indian massacre in 1831, a murder in 1899, and a fatal road accident in the 1970s.
- Katie Wheeler Library, in Irvine was the original ranch of the Irvine family. Now in use as a library, some report seeing a woman in blue, believed to be Kathryn Helena Irvine. The ghost of a "tall man" has also been reported and this is believed to be the ghost of James Irvine.
- Yorba Cemetery, in Yorba Linda, California, is allegedly haunted by the Pink Lady. The legend is that she appears on June 15 of every other year. Her identity is unknown but believed to be a woman who died in an accident coming home after a high school dance.

== San Diego County ==
- The Hotel del Coronado, Coronado, California, was completed in 1888, and its best-known ghost story centers around a woman named Kate Morgan who checked into the hotel days before her suicide in 1892. In the 1980s, a San Diego historian identified Kate Morgan as the hotel's Victorian Lady in Black ghost. After Morgan became the hotel's most famous ghost, the details surrounding the real Morgan's mysterious death became the subject of many conspiracies and ghostlore that continue to this day. But Kate Morgan may not be the only alleged ghost haunting the grand, Victorian hotel as there are over 30 documented deaths at the hotel from 1890 to 1980.
- Pioneer Park (San Diego) is famed for its haunted reputation, with numerous accounts of spectral sightings and unexplained occurrences.

== San Francisco ==
- The Queen Anne Hotel in San Francisco is a historic hotel in Pacific Heights. The Hotel used to be a girls boarding school in the 1800s. The headmaster, Mary Lake, is believed to still haunt the hotel.
- The Hotel Union, particularly room 207, has been reported to be haunted.
- Alcatraz Island and Alcatraz Federal Penitentiary are rumored to be haunted by some of the 1,576 inmates that lived there, and before that Miwok Indians believed that evil spirits inhabited the island.
- Golden Gate Bridge, Over 1000 people have committed suicide by jumping off the Bridge, resulting in claims of it being haunted.

== Santa Clara County ==
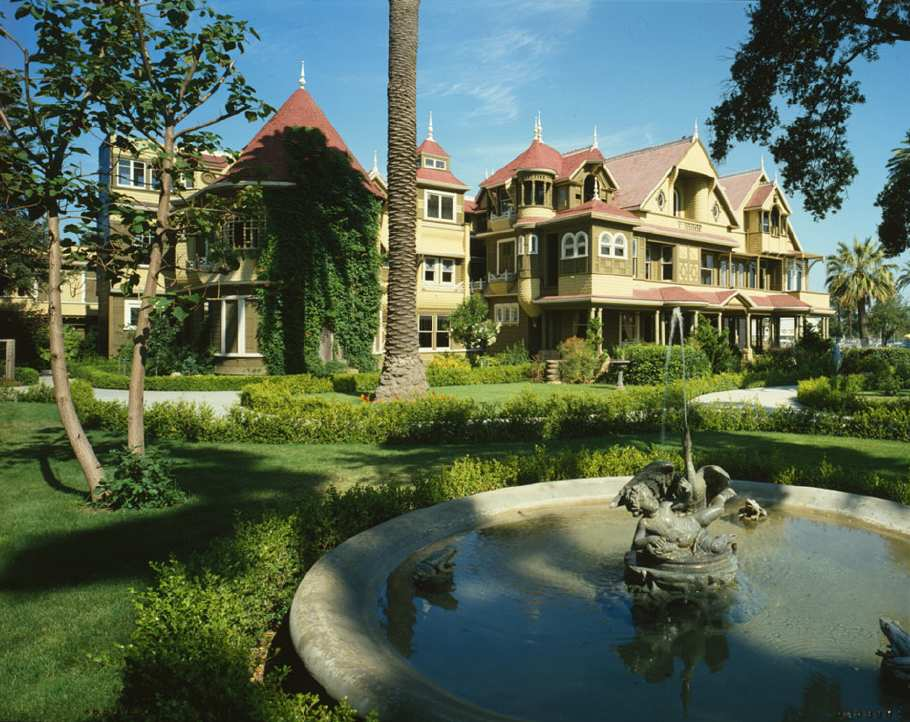
Winchester Mystery House

- The Winchester Mystery House in San Jose is supposedly haunted by the ghost of its eccentric builder, Sarah Winchester. She is said to have built the rambling mansion to protect her from the spirits of all those killed with her late husband's famous line of rifles.

== Santa Barbara County ==
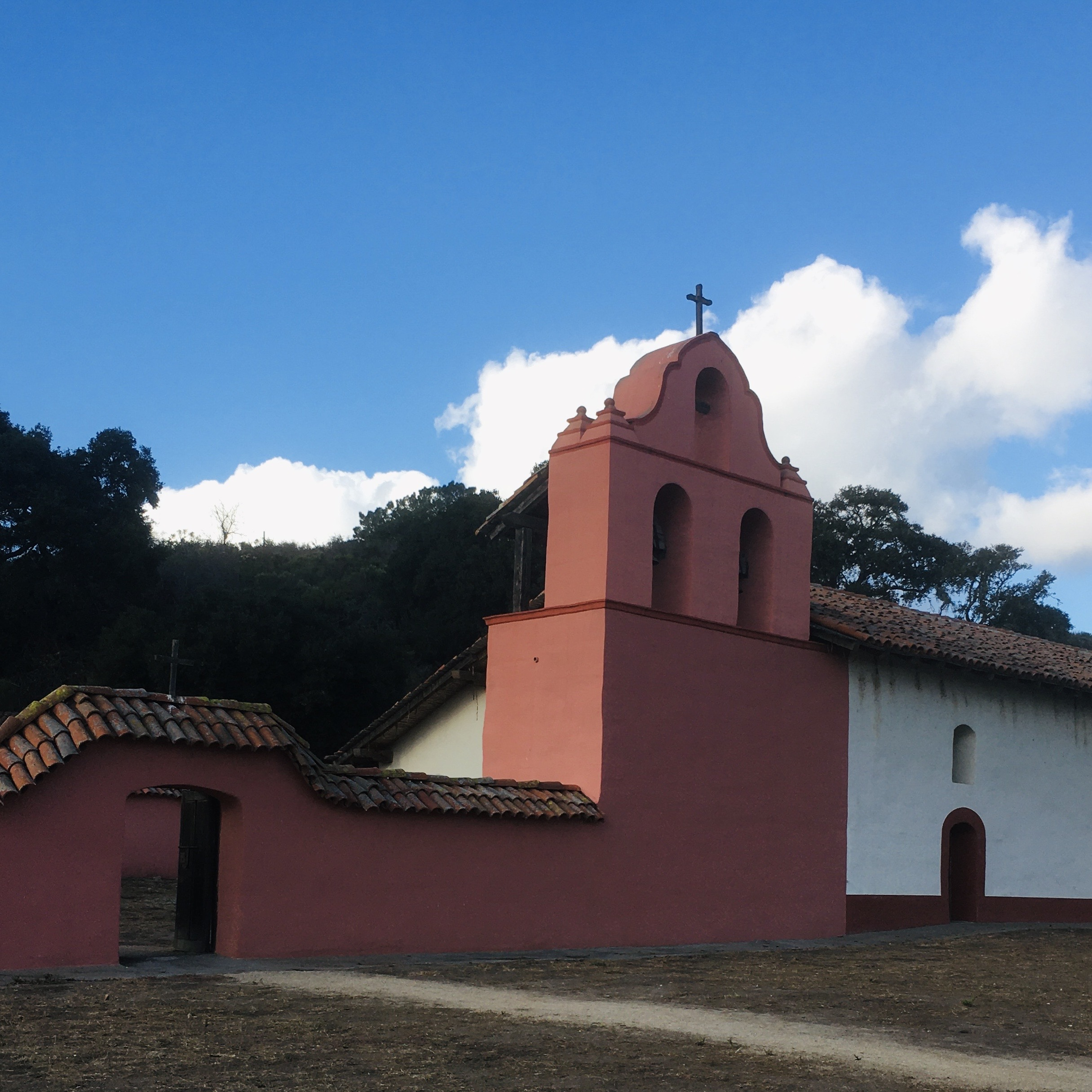
La Purisima Concepcion

The La Purisima Mission is purportedly haunted by ghosts of the Chumash Tribe who died from diseases that were brought by the Spaniards. People at the mission report eerie whispers, indistinct shapes, cold drafts, and more paranormal activity, including a Spirit Soldier. It was also included in the paranormal show Scariest Places on Earth.

== Ventura County ==
- The Glen Tavern Inn is a historic 1911 Arts and Crafts hotel in Santa Paula, that is reportedly haunted by the ghosts of children and adults from the 1910s and 1920s era. The inn is believed to be one of the most actively haunted buildings in the county despite a number of urban legends attached to the hotel.

== See also ==
- Reportedly haunted locations in the San Francisco Bay Area
- List of reportedly haunted locations in the United States
