= 126th Regiment of Foot =

Infantry regiment of the British Army

The 126th Regiment of Foot was an infantry regiment of the British Army, created in 1794 and disbanded in 1796. It was raised under the colonelcy of Arthur Annesley, 1st Earl of Mountnorris, 8th Viscount Valentia.
