= 126th Ohio Infantry Regiment =

- Active: September 4, 1862, to June 25, 1865
- Country: United States
- Allegiance: Union
- Branch: Infantry
- Engagements: New York Draft Riots; Bristoe Campaign; Mine Run Campaign; Battle of the Wilderness; Battle of Spotsylvania Court House; Battle of Totopotomoy Creek; Battle of Cold Harbor; Battle of Monocacy; Battle of Opequon; Battle of Fisher's Hill; Battle of Cedar Creek; Breakthrough at Petersburg; Appomattox Campaign

Insignia
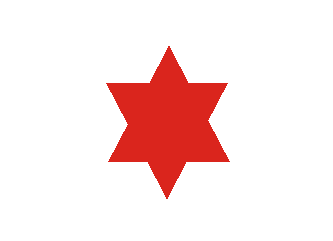
- VIII Corps

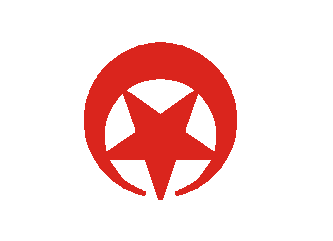
- 1st Division, VII Corps

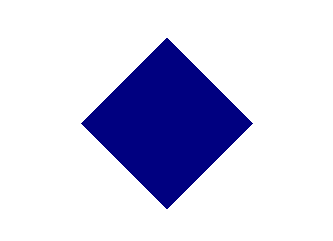
- 3rd Division, III Corps

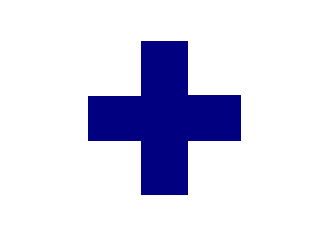
- 3rd Division, VI Corps

The 126th Ohio Infantry Regiment, sometimes 126th Regiment Ohio Volunteer Infantry (or 126th OVI) was an infantry regiment in the Union Army during the American Civil War.

== Service ==
The 126th Ohio Infantry was organized at Camp Steubenville in Steubenville, Ohio, and mustered in for three years service on September 4, 1862, under the command of Colonel Benjamin Franklin Smith.

The regiment was attached to Railroad Division, Western Virginia, to January 1863. Martinsburg, Virginia, VIII Corps, Middle Department, to March 1863. 2nd Brigade, 1st Division, VIII Corps, to June 1863. 3rd Brigade, French's Command, VIII Corps, to July 1863. 3rd Brigade, 3rd Division, III Corps, Army of the Potomac, to March 1864. 2nd Brigade, 3rd Division, VI Corps, Army of the Potomac and Army of the Shenandoah, Middle Military Division, to June 1865.

The 126th Ohio Infantry mustered out of service at Washington, D.C., on June 25, 1865.

=== Detailed service ===
==== 1862 ====
Moved to Parkersburg, Virginia., September 16, 1862. Moved to Cumberland, Maryland., October 17, 1862, and to North Mountain December 12. Guard duty on Baltimore & Ohio Railroad from North Mountain to Martinsburg December 12–20, and duty at Martinsburg until June 14, 1863.

==== 1863 ====
Expedition to Greenland Gap April 15–22. Action at Martinsburg June 14 (Company B). Retreat to Harper's Ferry June 15–17. Guard stores to Washington, D.C.; thence to Frederick, Maryland., July 1–5. Pursuit of Lee to Manassas Gap, Virginia., July 5–24. Action at Wapping Heights, Virginia, July 23. Duty in New York City during draft disturbances August 18-September 5. Bristoe Campaign October 9–22. Advance to line of the Rappahannock November 7–8. Kelly's Ford November 7. Brandy Station November 8. Mine Run Campaign November 26-December 2.

==== 1864 ====
Demonstration on the Rapidan February 6–7, 1864. Campaign from the Rapidan to the James River May 3-June 15. Battles of the Wilderness May 5–7. Spotsylvania May 8–12; Spotsylvania Court House (where a monument to the regiment stands) May 12–21. Assault on the Salient "Bloody Angle" May 12. North Anna River May 23–26. On line of the Pamunkey May 26–28. Totopotomoy May 28–31. Cold Harbor June 1–12. Before Petersburg June 18-July 6. Jerusalem Plank Road June 22–23. Ordered to Baltimore, Maryland, July 6. Battle of Monocacy Junction, Maryland, July 9. Sheridan's Shenandoah Valley Campaign August 7-November 28. Battle of Opequan, Winchester, September 19. Fisher's Hill September 22. Battle of Cedar Creek October 19. Duty at Kernstown until December. Moved to Washington, D.C., December 3; thence to Petersburg, Virginia Siege of Petersburg December 9, 1864, to April 2, 1865.

==== 1865 ====
Appomattox Campaign March 28-April 9. Assault on and fall of Petersburg April 2. Pursuit of Lee April 3–9. Sayler's Creek April 6. Guard prisoners at Burkesville April 6–15. March to Danville April 15–27, and duty there until May 16. Moved to Richmond, Virginia, May 16; thence to Washington, D.C., May 24-June 2. Corps Review June 9.

== Casualties ==
The regiment lost a total of 296 men during service; 9 officers and 111 enlisted men killed, 10 officers and 379 enlisted men wounded, 2 officers and 142 enlisted men died of disease.

== Commanders ==
- Colonel Benjamin Franklin Smith
- Lieutenant Colonel Aaron W. Ebright – commanded at the battles of Monocacy and Opequon; killed in action at the latter

== Notable members ==
- Corporal Milton Blickensderfer, Company E – Medal of Honor recipient for action at the third battle of Petersburg

== See also ==
- List of Ohio Civil War units
- Ohio in the Civil War
