= Henry H. Whaley =

American politician (1818–1888)

Henry Hurst Whaley
- Born: c. 1818; New York City, New York, US
- Died: after 1888
- Occupations: Politician, businessman
- Known for: Politician, early San Diego settler
- Title: President of the San Diego Board of Trustees (informal mayor)
- Term: 1858–1859
- Spouse: Annie Whaley
- Children: John Thomas Whaley
- Parent(s): Thomas Alexander Whaley Sr., Rachel Pye
- Relatives: Thomas Whaley (brother)

Henry Hurst Whaley (c. 1818–after 1888) was an American politician. He was an early settler of San Diego.

Henry H. Whaley was born c. 1818 in New York City to Thomas Alexander Whaley Sr. and Rachel Pye. His father died in 1832, leaving Rachael to raise the family.

Henry, with his brother John, took over their late father's locksmith business when they became old enough. They obtained government contracts in Washington, D.C., where he lived for a time, and the nearby government depot at Harpers Ferry.

Henry and his wife Annie moved to San Diego in May 1855. Henry went into partnership with his brother Thomas, and reopened the General Store Thomas previously ran in Old Town San Diego as "Whaley and Whaley." They also operated a brick manufacturing business, bought from George P. Tebbetts. Henry and Annie lived with his brother and wife until they had their own home. Henry and Annie quarreled frequently and were often drunk, both in public and private. Henry often overcharged customers, was loud, and often drunk. Frustrated, Thomas dissolved the partnership in November 1855. In retaliation, Henry assaulted Thomas in the store, and when Henry was sent out to the street, he shouted insults and obscenities and challenged Thomas to come out and fight. The brothers weren't on speaking terms after that.

In 1857, Henry was a victim of an apparently unprovoked knife attack on him and Lewis Franklin by William "Reub" Leroy. Leroy attacked the two and ran from Franklin's store. He pulled a man off a horse and ran it to the Presidio Hill, where he remained. Authorities came and arrested him. Whaley's arm had to be amputated as a result of the attack. Leroy was held in the county "jail" (an adobe building) where he dug out and descaped with another prisoner.

Whaley was Associate Judge, Court of Sessions, San Diego County during 1857–1858. Whaley was appointed president for the San Diego city board of trustees (informally called "mayor") during 1858–1859.

Henry and Annie had at least one son, John Thomas.

== See also ==
- "The Whaley House", The Journal of San Diego History 6:2 (April 1960) by June A. Strudwick
- Henry H. Whaley House
- 1888 Great Register of Voters for San Diego shows Henry H. Whaley age 70, born New York.

Preceded by Thomas Collins	President of the San Diego Board of Trustees; 1857–1858	Succeeded by Thomas Whaley
