= 126th Pennsylvania Infantry Regiment =

Union Army infantry regiment

126th Pennsylvania Infantry
- Pennsylvania flag
- Active: August 10, 1862, to May 20, 1863
- Country: United States
- Allegiance: Union
- Branch: Infantry
- Engagements: Battle of Fredericksburg; Battle of Chancellorsville

Commanders
- Notable commanders: James G. Elder

The 126th Regiment Pennsylvania Volunteers was an infantry regiment of the Union Army of the American Civil War.

== History ==
The 126th Pennsylvania was recruited in Juniata, Fulton, and Franklin counties during the summer of 1862. Its term of enlistment was nine months. Many of the men and officers had served in the 2nd Pennsylvania Infantry, a regiment whose term had expired. James G. Elder became the colonel of the 126th, D. Watson Rowe lieutenant colonel, and James C. Austin major. The regiment was mustered into service at Camp Curtin between August 6 and 10, after which it was ordered to Northern Virginia. It was there assigned to the 1st Brigade, 3rd Division, V Corps in the Army of the Potomac.

The division arrived too late to participate in the Battle of Antietam. While encamped near the battlefield in the weeks afterward, the 126th received its regimental flags and was reviewed by President Abraham Lincoln. The regiment's first battle came three months later at Fredericksburg, where it lost 27 killed, 50 wounded, and 3 missing. Following the battle, the 126th served as part of the rearguard while the rest of the Army retreated across the river.

At the Battle of Chancellorsville on May 2, 1863, the division remained on the Union left flank near the Rappahannock River. The next day, the regiment was moved to the right flank, where it came under attack. After two hours of fighting and subsequently running out of ammunition, the 126th was forced to retreat to the protection of artillery. Its losses were 9 killed, 49 wounded, and 11 captured. Rowe was among those wounded.

Shortly afterwards, the regiment was ordered back to Harrisburg, Pennsylvania, where it was mustered out on May 20, 1863.

== Reenactors ==
A group based in Mercersburg, Pennsylvania, represents Company C.

== Casualties ==
- Killed and mortally wounded: 1 officer, 30 enlisted men
- Died of disease: 0 officers, 34 enlisted men
- Total: 1 officer, 64 enlisted men

== Sources ==
- Pennsylvania in the American Civil War
- Bates, Samuel P., History of the Pennsylvania Volunteers, 1861-1865, Volume 4
