= EDA =

EDA or Eda may refer to:

== Computing ==
- Electronic design automation
- Enterprise Desktop Alliance, a computer technology consortium
- Enterprise digital assistant
- Estimation of distribution algorithm
- Event-driven architecture
- Exploratory data analysis

== Government and politics ==
- Economic Development Administration, an agency of the United States government
- Election Defense Alliance, an American voting integrity organization
- European Defence Agency, a branch of the European Union
- Excess Defense Articles, an American arms distribution program
- European Democratic Alliance, a former political group in the European Parliament
- Eidgenössisches Departement für auswärtige Angelegenheiten (Federal Department of Foreign Affairs), a branch of the government of Switzerland
- Ejército del Aire (Spanish Air Force), the air force of Spain
- Eniéa Dimokratikí Aristerá (United Democratic Left) (1951–1967, 1977–1985), a former Greek political party
- Electoral District Association, a local unit of a political party in Canada

== People ==
- Eda (given name), a given name
- Eda (surname), a Japanese surname

== Places ==
- Eda, Sweden
- Eda (building), a residential high-rise building in Salford Quays, England
- Eda glasbruk, Sweden
- Eda Station (disambiguation)

== Science and medicine ==
- 3,4-Ethylenedioxyamphetamine, an amphetamine drug
- Ectodysplasin A, a protein
- Electrically-Debondable Adhesive
- Electrodermal activity
- Electron donor acceptor complexes, a type of Charge-transfer complex
- European Delirium Association
- Exploratory data analysis
- Extreme demand avoidance, a behavioral profile associated with severe anxiety and autism

== Other uses ==
- EDA Awards, American film awards
- Eda IF, a Swedish sport club
- Eighth Doctor Adventures, a series of novels based on the television series Doctor Who
