= Eda (given name) =

- Pronunciation: Turkish: [ˈeda] Old English: [ˈeːdɑː]
- Gender: Female
- Language: Old Norse, Japanese, Turkish

Origin
- Meaning: was-given, wealthy, mannerly

Other names
- Related names: Ada, Edy, Edi, Edda, Ida, Oda, Uda, Edanur

Eda is a name that has arisen independently in multiple regions.

Eda is a popular Turkish female first name, meaning manner, expression and affectation; derived from the Arabic word, adā (أداء).

The name is also found in Old Norse, and subsequently, Old English language, with meaning "strive for wealth". Eda was a goddess in northern mythology, the Guardian of Time and Wealth. The name is also a variant of Edith, Edna and Hedwig. It is sometimes considered the shortened version of the male name Edwin.

In the United States, Eda is a fairly common first name for women (#1953 out of 4276 in 1990) but an uncommon surname or last name. Eda and Edda were popular in Italy before the fall of Fascism, as Mussolini's daughter was named Edda.

In Japan it is a common last name (see Eda (surname)).

== Eda ==
- Eda Ahi (born 1990), Estonian poet, translator and diplomat
- Eda Ece (born 1990), Turkish actress
- Eda Erdem Dündar (born 1987), Turkish volleyball player
- Eda Karataş (born 1995), Turkish footballer
- Eda Kersey (1904–1944), British violinist
- Eda LeShan (1922–2002), American writer, television host, counselor, educator, and playwright
- Eda Hurd Lord (1854–1938), American businesswomen
- Eda Lord Dixon (1876–1926), American metal artist; daughter of Eda Hurd Lord
- Eda C. Martin (1902–1982), American politician
- Eda Nolan (born 1988), Filipina actress
- Eda Özerkan (born 1984), Turkish actress
- Eda Rapoport (1890–1968), Jewish-American composer and pianist of Latvian origin
- Eda Rivas (born 1952), Peruvian lawyer and politician
- Eda Tuğsuz (born 1997), Turkish track and field athlete
- Eda Warren (1903–1980), American film editor
- Eda Zoritte (born 1926), Israeli writer, essayist, playwright, translator and poet

=== Fictional characters ===
- Eda Clawthorne, a character in the American animated fantasy TV series The Owl House

== Edanur ==
- Edanur Burhan (born 1999), Turkish handballer
- Edanur Çetin (born 2000), Turkish handballer

== See also ==
- Edda (given name)
