= Edla (given name) =

Edla is a given name. Notable people with the given name include:

- Edla Blommér (1817–1908), Finnish painter
- Edla Hansen (1883–1979), Danish film editor
- Edla Lyytinen (1874–1919), Finnish politician
- Edla Muir (1906–1971), American architect
- Edla Van Steen (1936–2018), Brazilian journalist, actress, and writer

== See also ==
- Edla, Slavic woman in the 10th-11th centuries
- Elise, Countess of Edla
- Eda (given name)
