= Villa Carlotta (disambiguation) =

Villa Carlotta is a building in Tremezzo, Italy.

Villa Carlotta or Villa Carlota may also refer to:

- Villa Carlotta (Altadena), a house in Altadena, California
- Villa Carlotta (Hollywood), an apartment building in Hollywood, Los Angeles, California
- Villa Carlota, Mexico
