= Eyeless in Gaza =

Eyeless in Gaza may refer to:

- "Eyeless in Gaza", a quote from John Milton's closet drama Samson Agonistes
- Eyeless in Gaza (novel), 1936 novel by Aldous Huxley, who took the title from Milton's drama
- Eyeless in Gaza (band), English post-punk band which took its name from Huxley's novel
