= Emma Asp =

Swedish footballer (born 1987)

Personal information
- Full name: Emma Asp
- Date of birth: 24 June 1987 (age 39)
- Place of birth: Sweden
- Position: Defender

Senior career*
Years	Team	Apps	(Gls)
2011–2015	Mallbackens IF	30	(1)
- * Club domestic league appearances and goals as of 02:21, 23 August 2020 (UTC)

Emma Asp (born 24 June 1987) is a Swedish former football defender. Starting out in Eda IF, she joined Mallbackens IF in 2004. She left Mallbacken in 2015, stating no plans to continue playing football professionally.
