= Eyeless in Gaza (novel) =

1936 novel by Aldous Huxley

- Dust-jacket from the first edition
- Author: Aldous Huxley
- Language: English
- Publisher: Chatto & Windus
- Publication date: 1936
- Publication place: United Kingdom
- Media type: Print (Hardback)
- Pages: 619
- ISBN: 978-0061724893

Eyeless in Gaza is a novel by Aldous Huxley, first published in 1936. It is an account of the life of an English socialite named Anthony Beavis between the 1890s and 1935.

== Inspiration for title and story ==
The title is taken from a phrase in John Milton's Samson Agonistes:

... Promise was that I
Should Israel from Philistian yoke deliver;
Ask for this great deliverer now, and find him
Eyeless in Gaza at the Mill with slaves ...

The title of the book, like Milton's poem, recalls the biblical story of Samson; he was captured by the Philistines, his eyes were burned out and he was taken to Gaza, where he was forced to work at grinding grain in a mill.

Huxley's biographer, Sybille Bedford, whom Huxley knew from being neighbors in the south of France, says in her fictional memoir Jigsaw that two of the novel's characters – Mary Amberley, a jaded drug addict with a taste for young men, and her daughter Helen – were partly inspired by Bedford and her mother, who was addicted to morphine. The subplot of Anthony as a boy dealing with the loss of his mother, and the effect of the loss on his distraught father may also have been influenced by Huxley himself losing his mother at 14.

== Plot and style ==
The novel focuses on four periods in the life of an English socialite named Anthony Beavis (circa 1902, 1914, 1928, and 1934), but the chapters are not in chronological order; as a result, the reader experiences the events in a piecemeal way as they happen or are related non-sequentially. Some chapters resemble diary entries by Anthony, others are third-person narrations, and in some chapters the narrative viewpoint drifts. The story describes Anthony's experiences as he goes through private school, college, and various romantic affairs, and the meaninglessness of high society life with its materialism and shallow sexual liaisons. He then begins to seek a source of meaning, and seems to find it when he discovers pacifism and then a Buddhist-tinged mysticism.

The story alternates between the different time periods as Anthony pursues a superficial affair with Helen Amberley in France as he writes a sociology textbook; during his childhood as he is mourning his mother's death and feeling lonely in a boy's boarding school; his affair as a young man with a sexually aggressive older woman, Mary Amberley, Helen's mother; his childhood friendship with kindly Brian Foxe who suffers from stuttering; and his charged friendship with boarding school alumnus Mark Staithes, a pugnacious and cynical Communist. Part of the story's action is motivated by Mary Amberley maliciously teasing young Anthony into seducing Brian's naïve fiancée Joan in 1914 and the guilt Anthony feels over betraying his best friend; another part is Anthony's gradual evolution into disenchantment with upper-class amorality and the growing violence in 1930s political activism, and his embrace of altruistic pacifism.

== Critical reception ==
Although Eyeless in Gaza is less well-known and has been adapted fewer times than Huxley's Brave New World, it was generally highly praised by contemporary critics. The English journalist Simon Heffer has called the novel Huxley's best book and his only "great novel". According to Heffer, the book both harkens back to Huxley's early satires and links to the more serious and philosophical concerns of his later novels. Formally, the novel uses a modernist stream of consciousness but based in fact, unlike the novels of Woolf, Proust and Joyce, whose narrators' memories are unreliable. Heffer writes that the novel explores the tension between wartime and pacifism in a particularly productive way, that Huxley is a "sophisticated, original English man of letters" who deserves a reevaluation, and that this novel is a good place to start. In Strictly English, Heffer's guide to writing clearly, he recommends Eyeless in Gaza as containing examples of what he considers to be Huxley's masterful use of parentheses (both brackets and dashes) and of the single dash.

== Adaptation ==
- Eyeless in Gaza (1971), BBC miniseries (5 episodes) directed by James Cellan Jones; adaptation by Robin Chapman
