= Ledda =

Ledda is a surname. Notable people with the surname include:

- Elena Ledda (born 1959), Italian singer
- Gavino Ledda (born 1938), Italian author and scholar

== See also ==
- Edda (given name)
- Ledda Bay, bay of Antarctica
