= Eda Hurd Lord =

American businesswoman (1854–1938)

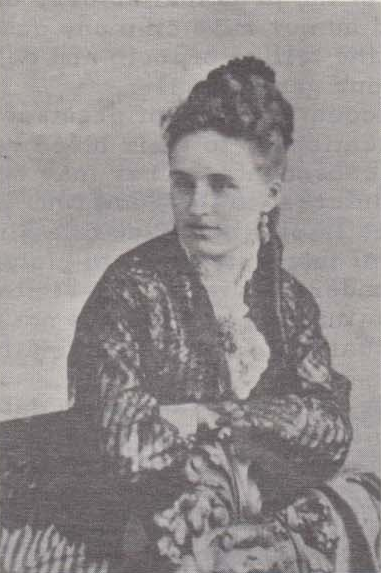
Eda Hurd Lord

Eda Isadore Hurd Lord (March 8, 1854 – February 26, 1938) was an American businesswoman from Evanston, Illinois. She was responsible for plotting the city's land and developing the residential spaces.

== Early life ==
Eda Isadore Hurd Lord was born on March 8, 1854, the daughter of Harvey B. Hurd (1828-1906) and Cornelia A. Hilliard. She had two sisters: Hettie B. Hurd (1855-1884) and Nellie Hurd Comstock (1857-1940).

== Career ==
=== Real Estate developer ===
Eda Hurd Lord, was a successful businesswoman, one of the first in Evanston, and is responsible for plotting the city's land and developing the residential spaces. She designed 32 houses on the land she inherited from her father. Among her real estate properties (or related to her family):

- 1890–91, 1625 Ashland Avenue, Joseph Silsbee, for Harvey B. Hurd
- 1896, 1600-02 Ashland Avenue, Myron Hunt, for Harvey B. Hurd
- 1897, 1580 Ashland Avenue, Myron Hunt, for Harvey B. Hurd
- 1898, 1570-74 Ashland Avenue, Myron Hunt, for Harvey B. Hurd
- 1899, 1420 Davis Street, Charles Ayars, for Jeannie Lord Ayars
- 1908 2740 Ridge Avenue, Walter Griffin, for William Sinclair Lord
- 1909 1583 Ashland Avenue, George W. Maher, for Eda Hurd Lord
- 1909 52-54 Lake Street, for Eda Hurd Lord, sold to Aaron N. Young, valued $88,295 (ca. $2,131,723.84 in 2017)
- 1909, 1421 Elinor Place, Perkins and Will, for Eda Hurd Lord
- 1910, 1415 Elinor Place, Perkins and Will, for Eda Hurd Lord
- 1910, 1416 Elinor Place, Perkins and Will, for Eda Hurd Lord
- 1911-1912 1575 Ashland Avenue, George W. Maher, for George S. Lord
- 1912, 1550 Asbury Avenue, Perkins and Will, for Eda Hurd Lord
- 1911–12, 1631 Ashland Avenue, Walter Burley Griffin, for Hurd Comstock
- 1911–12, 1416 Church Street, Walter Burley Griffin, for Hurd Comstock

Lord's father, Harvey B. Hurd, was the first president of the Evanston village board of trustees, and founder and first president of the Evanston Historical Society. He hired Myron Hunt to develop his properties. Lord instead engaged Dwight Perkins and George W. Maher and opened Elinor Place. Her grandnephew Hurd Comstock, son of her sister Nellie Hurd Comstock, hired Walter Burley Griffin

=== Patron of arts ===
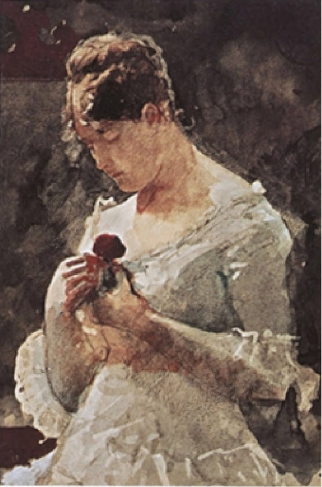
A Woman with a Rose by Winslow Homer

She was the owner of the watercolor on paper A Woman with a Rose by Winslow Homer, ca. 1879, donated in 1938 to the San Diego Museum of Art. She also owned the watercolor Shepherdesses Resting (1879) and the drawing The Shepherdess (1878). In December 1879 at an auction held by William A. Butters and Company, she bought Man with Plow Horse, currently on loan to the Chicago Art Institute. At the same auction she possible bought the pencil and gouache on paper Through the Fields (1879), in 1923 appeared at the J.W. Young Galleries, in Chicago, Illinois.

== Personal life ==
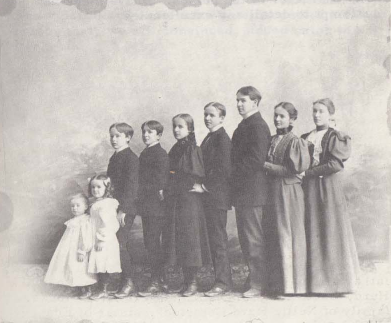
Children of Eda Hurd Lord

On April 29, 1873, she married George Sterling Lord (1850-1916), a wholesale druggist for Lord, Owen & Co., a company started by his father Thomas Lord. She is the mother of Eda Lord Dixon (1876-1926). Her other children are: Jeannie Henry Ayers (b. 1875), Harvey Hurd Lord (1878-1920), Thomas Lord (1880-1951), Kate Kimball Lord (1882-1908), Sterling Lord (b. 1884), Robert Owen Lord (1886-1968), a banker, Margaret Lord Burnham (1892-1979), George Willis Lord (1894-1977). She is the grandmother of Eda Lord and Suzanne Lord Folds.

She was a talented musician and a patron of arts. She moved to California in 1921.

She died on February 26, 1938, at La Jolla, California, and is buried at Lake Forest Cemetery, Lake Forest, Illinois.

== Legacy ==
The novel "Childsplay" is an semi-autobiographical novel recounting in part Eda Lord's life as a child living with her grandmother at 1558 Ridge Avenue, Evanston, Illinois.

In 1963 Sterling Lord published Victorian Vignettes: Eda Hurd Lord 1963.
