= Lyytinen =

Lyytinen is a Finnish surname.

== Geographical distribution ==
As of 2014, 91.7% of all known bearers of the surname Lyytinen were residents of Finland (frequency 1:4,547), 5.3% of the United States (1:5,160,733) and 1.1% of Canada (1:2,453,200).

In Finland, the frequency of the surname was higher than national average (1:4,547) in the following regions:

1. Northern Savonia (1:801)
2. Central Finland (1:2,911)
3. Southern Savonia (1:3,110)
4. Päijänne Tavastia (1:3,822)

== People ==
- Edla Lyytinen (1874–1919), Finnish politician
- Kalle Lyytinen (born 1953), Finnish computer scientist
- Erja Lyytinen (born 1976), Finnish vocalist, guitarist and songwriter
- Joonas Lyytinen (born 1995), Finnish professional ice hockey defenceman
