= Kawamae =

Kawamae (written: 川前 lit. "in front of the river") is a Japanese surname. Notable people with the surname include:

- Naoki Kawamae (川前 直樹, born 1982), Japanese badminton player
- Rikiya Kawamae (川前 力也, born 1971), Japanese footballer

== See also ==
- Kawamae Station (川前駅, Kawamae-eki), train station in Iwaki, Fukushima Prefecture, Japan
