= Edda (disambiguation) =

Edda are poems and tales of Norse mythology. It may also refer to:

- Edda (given name), a list of people
- Edda people, a sub-group of the Igbo ethnic group in south-east Nigeria, also the ancestral home of the Edda people
- The ancestress of serfs in the Rígsþula
- Edda Award, Icelandic film and television award
- Edda Media, Norwegian media group
- Edda Művek, Hungarian rock band
- 673 Edda, minor planet orbiting the Sun
- Ethylenediaminediacetic acid (EDDA), a chelating agent
- Edda. Scandinavian Journal of Literary Research
- Edda, a fictional Norwegian town in the TV series Ragnarok

== Other uses ==
- Alejandro Edda, (born 1984) Mexican-American actor
