= Ezra J. Warner (historian) =

American historian (1910–1974)

- Born: Ezra Joseph Warner; July 4, 1910; Lake Forest, Illinois, U.S.
- Died: May 30, 1974 (aged 63); La Jolla, California, U.S.
- Resting place: Lake Forest Cemetery

Academic work
- Discipline: Military history

Ezra Joseph Warner III (July 4, 1910 – May 30, 1974) was an American historian of the American Civil War.

== Biography ==
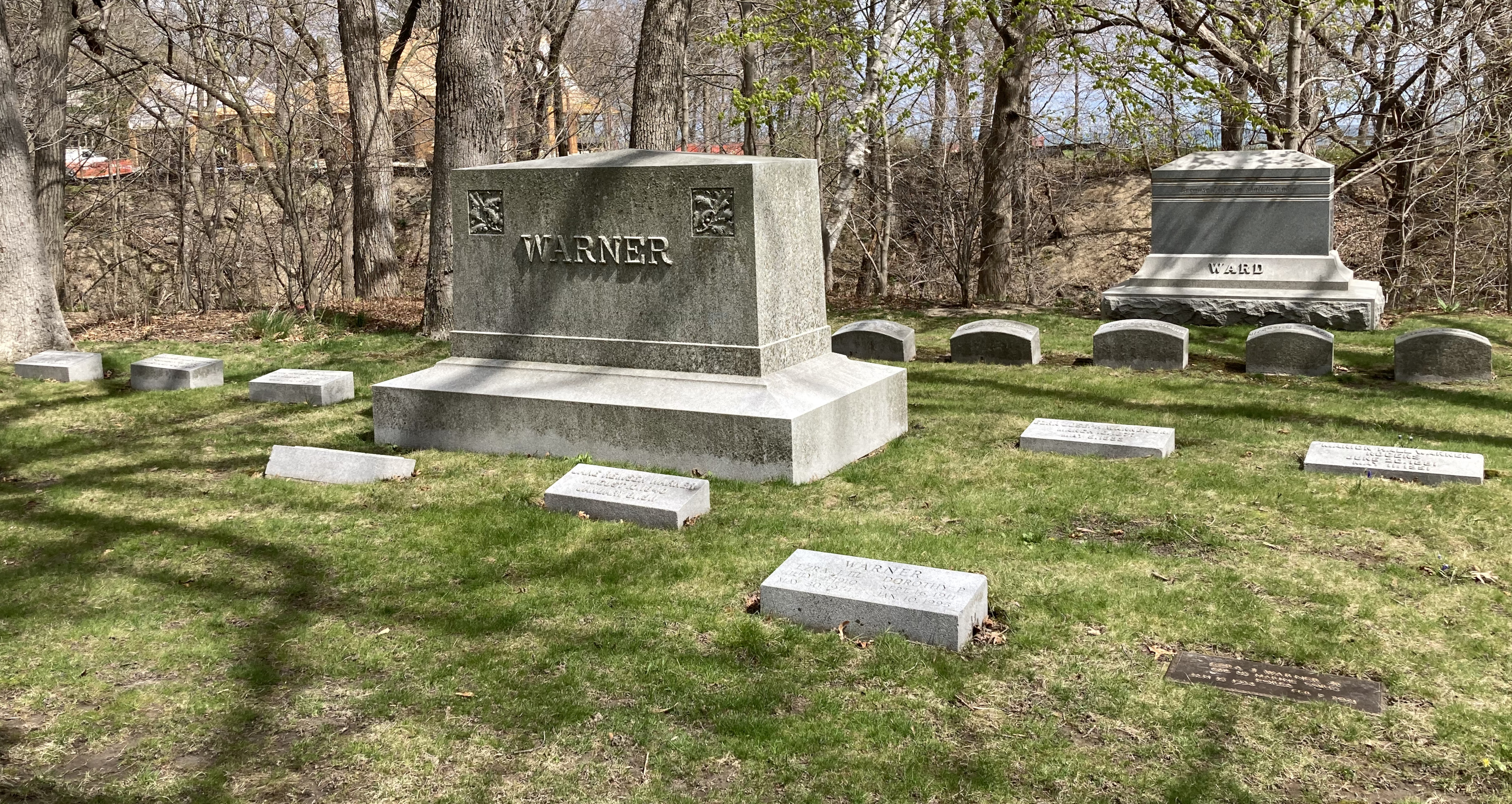
Warner's grave at Lake Forest Cemetery

He was born in Lake Forest, Illinois, and lived in La Jolla, California, where he worked as an investment counselor. He was the son of Ezra J. Warner Jr. and grandson of Ezra J Warner, who were wholesale grocery business executives in Chicago, Illinois. His father, Ezra J. Warner Jr., was president and treasurer of wholesale grocery business Sprague, Warner & Company and vice president of the Chicago Orchestral Association. His mother was the former Marion Hall. His great uncle was Union General James M. Warner.

Ezra J. Warner died in La Jolla on May 30, 1974, and was buried at Lake Forest Cemetery in Illinois.

== Works ==
Ezra J. Warner III is well known for his work in Civil War biography. His works included:

- Warner, Ezra J. (1959). Generals in Gray: Lives of the Confederate Commanders. Baton Rouge, LA: Louisiana State University Press. OCLC 44505.
- Warner, Ezra J. (1964). Generals in Blue: Lives of the Union Commanders. Baton Rouge, LA: Louisiana State University Press. OCLC 445056..
- Warner, Ezra J. (1975). Biographical Register of the Confederate Congress. Baton Rouge, LA: Louisiana State University Press. ISBN 978-0-8071-0092-9..
