= Feldkirch (Hartheim) =

- Ortsteil of Hartheim am Rhein
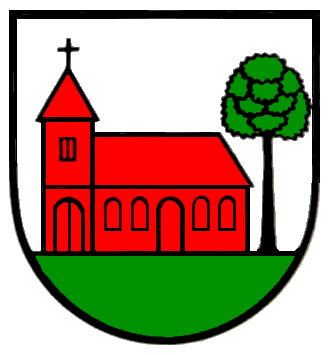
- Coat of arms
- Interactive map of Feldkirch
- Location within Germany Location within Baden-Württemberg
- Coordinates: 47°56′9″N 7°38′55″E
- Country: Germany
- State: Baden-Württemberg
- Admin. region: Freiburg
- District: Breisgau-Hochschwarzwald
- Municipality: Hartheim am Rhein

Government
  - Mayor: Antoinette Faller (CDU)

Population (2016)
  - Total: 900
- Time zone: UTC+01:00 (CET)
  - Summer (DST): UTC+02:00 (CEST)
- Postal codes: 79258
- Dialling codes: 07633
- Vehicle registration: FR

Feldkirch is a small town in Baden-Württemberg, Germany, a few minutes from the French border (4 km) and near Switzerland. It is part of the town Hartheim am Rhein.

It has a small bakery, 3 restaurants, and 3 hotels (guesthouses). The village is known for its crops, especially for the asparagus. They also grow onions, potatoes, strawberries and other berries.

It is famous as the childhood home of Sybille von Schoenebeck, later to gain fame as author Sybille Bedford, in the 1910s. It came to prominence in the 21st century with the publication of Bedford's autobiography Quicksands: A Memoir, though it was also mentioned in her 1989 Booker Prize-nominated Jigsaw: An Unsentimental Education.

== History ==
The name Veltkilcha appears in documents in 1160. 1475 there were 10 hearths, i.e. 10 families who have settled around the "church on the field". During the Thirty Years' War (1618–48), the village and the church were completely destroyed. In 1690 the reconstruction of the Bergische Whose castle began. It received much of its present form. In 1866 the presence of Whose Berger in Feldkirch ends. Since that time, the castle changed its owners frequently. By 1899, the mayor Heinrich Rinderle was in the possession of the castle. He generously distributed the property to the farmers of the community. In 1960, a comprehensive restoration of the Martin Church was completed. In 1964 Feldkirch celebrated the construction of Wessenberg school. Ten years later, in 1974, the kindergarten St. Martin was founded. In the same year, Feldkirch became part of Hartheim.

== Gallery ==
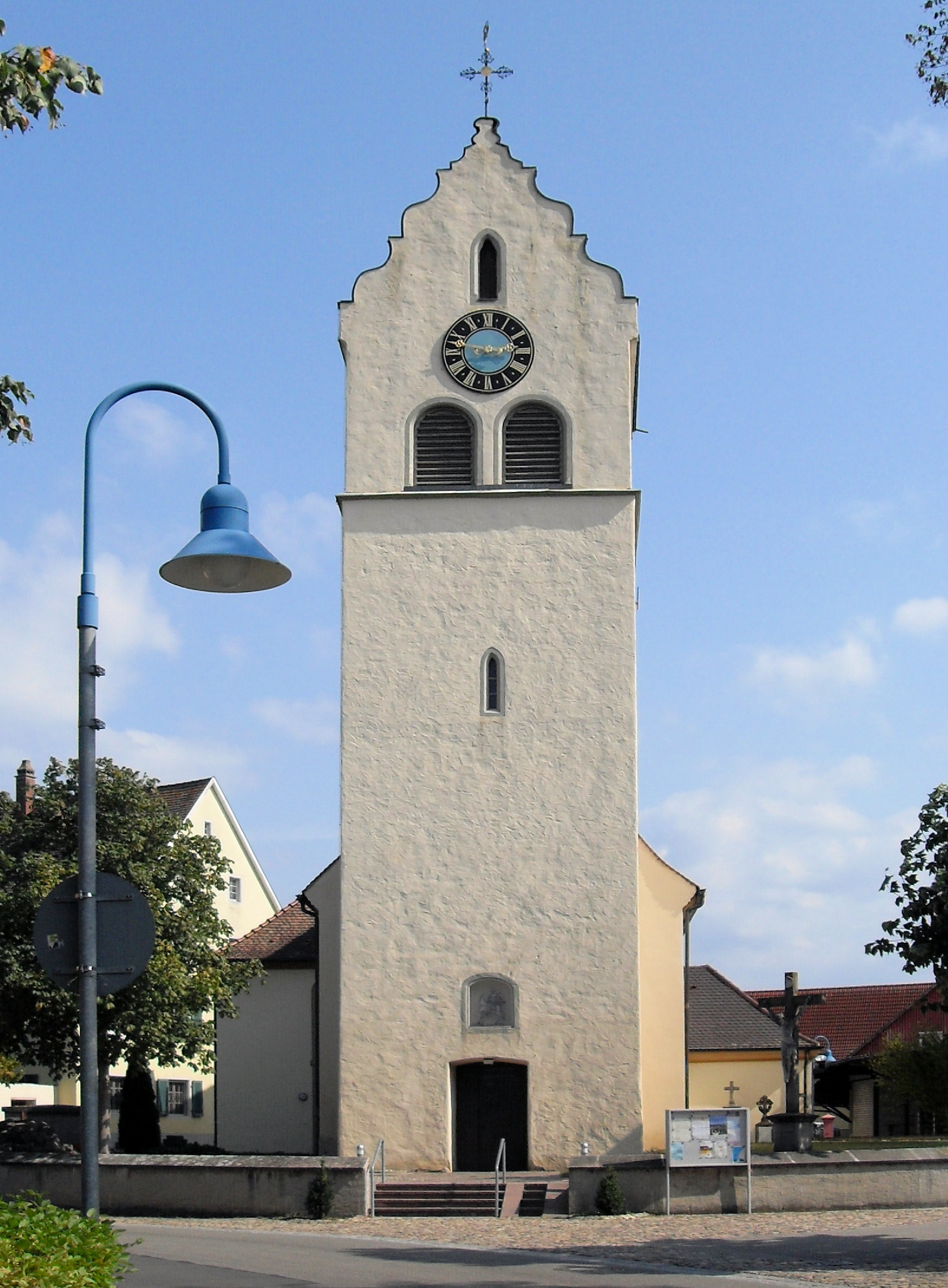
Church St. Martin Feldkirch

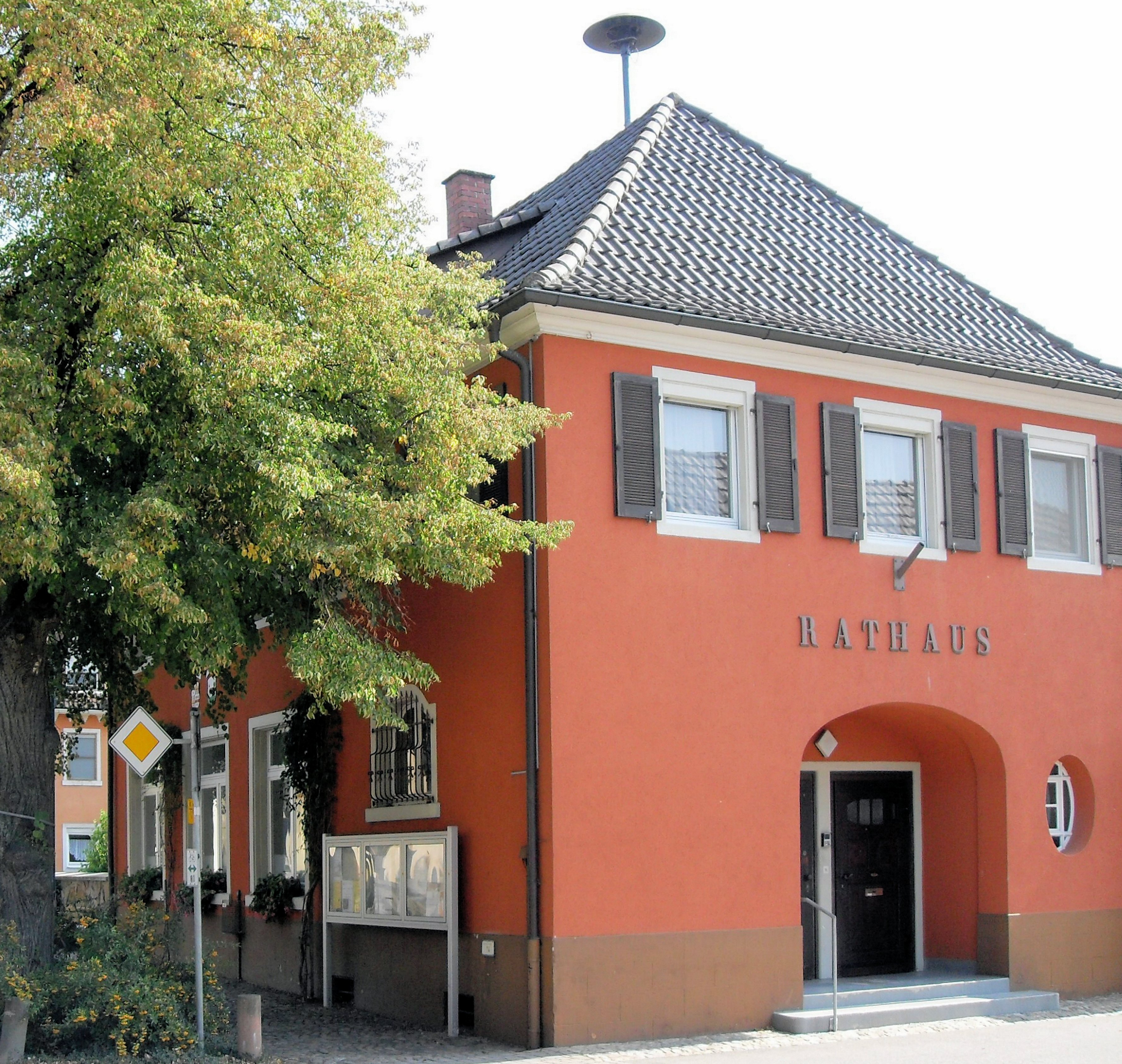
town hall of Feldkirch

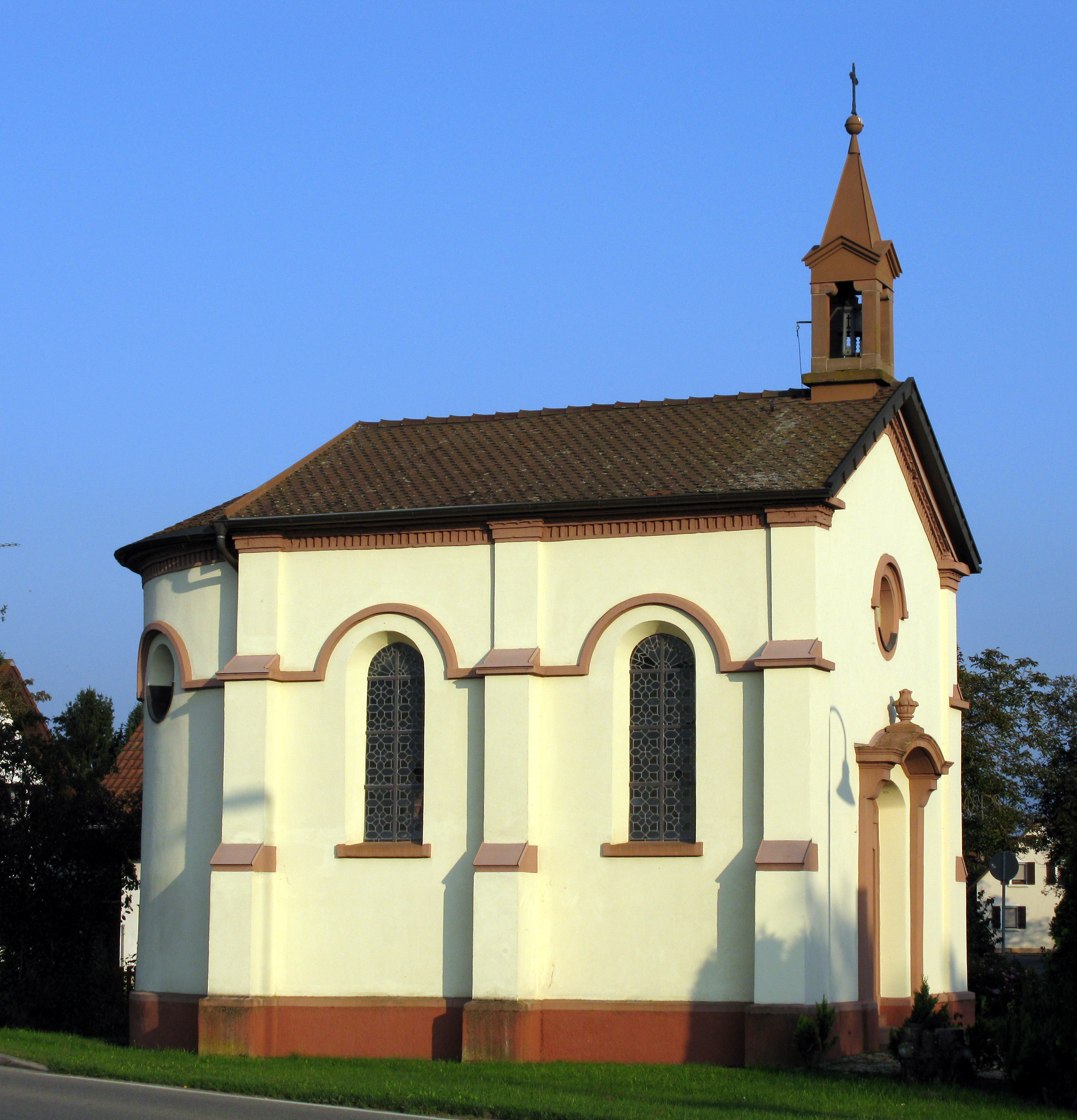
Ottilienkapelle in Feldkirch
