= Natsui Station =

Railway station in Ono, Fukushima Prefecture, Japan

Natsui Station 夏井駅
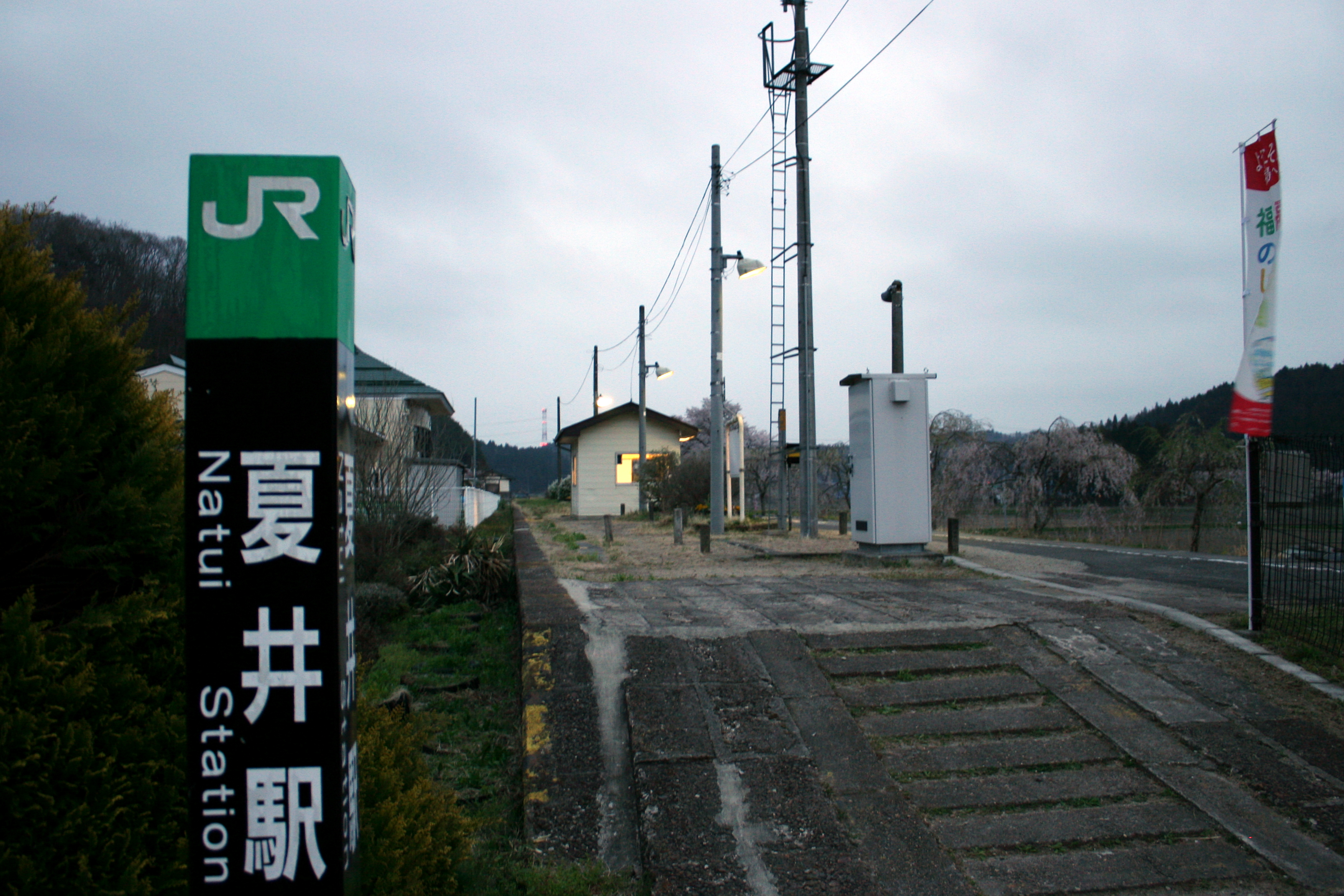
- Natsui Station in April 2014

General information
- Location: Natsui Machiya 54, Ono-machi, Tamura-gun, Fukushima-ken 963-3312; Japan
- Coordinates: 37.2529°N 140.6623°E
- Operator: JR East
- Line: ■ Ban'etsu East Line
- Distance: 36.7 km from Iwaki
- Platforms: 1 side platform

Other information
- Status: Unstaffed
- Website: Official website

History
- Opened: October 10, 1917

Services
| Preceding station | JR East | Following station |
|---|---|---|
| Ononiimachi towards Kōriyama | Ban'etsu East Line Local | Kawamae towards Iwaki |
Location
- Location within Fukushima Prefecture Location within Japan

Natsui Station (夏井駅, Natsui-eki) is a railway station in the town of Ono, Tamura District, Fukushima Prefecture, Japan operated by East Japan Railway Company (JR East).

== Lines ==
Natsui Station is served by the Ban'etsu East Line, and is located 36.7 rail kilometers from the official starting point of the line at Iwaki Station.

== Station layout ==
The station has one side platform serving a single bi-directional track. The station is unattended.

== History ==
Natsui Station opened on October 10, 1917. The station was absorbed into the JR East network upon the privatization of the Japanese National Railways (JNR) on April 1, 1987.

== Surrounding area ==
- Natsui River
- Natsui Post Office

== See also ==
- List of railway stations in Japan
