= Eda Lord Dixon =

American artist

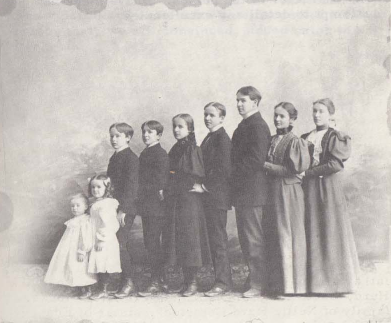
Eda Hurd Lord's children, Eda Lord Dixon is second from the right

Eda Hurd Lord Young Dixon (November 30, 1876 – February 14, 1926) was a metal artist working within the Arts and Crafts movement at the beginning of the 20th century.

== Early life ==
Eda Hurd Lord was born on November 30, 1876, in Evanston, Illinois. From an illustrious Evanston family, she was the granddaughter of Harvey B. Hurd. Her mother, Eda Hurd Lord, was a successful businesswomen, one of the first in Evanston, and is responsible for platting the city's land and developing the residential spaces. Her father was George S. Lord, a wholesale druggist for Lord, Owen & Co., a company started by his father Thomas Lord. The Lords moved to Evanston in 1857. The novel "Childsplay" by Eda Lord is a semi-autobiographical novel recounting in part Lord's life as a child living with her grandmother, Eda Hurd Lord, in Evanston, where also Eda Lord Dixon grew up.

She studied art in Chicago. She trained with Alexander Fisher of London and James Herbert Winn of Chicago, both leading enamel artists.

== Career ==
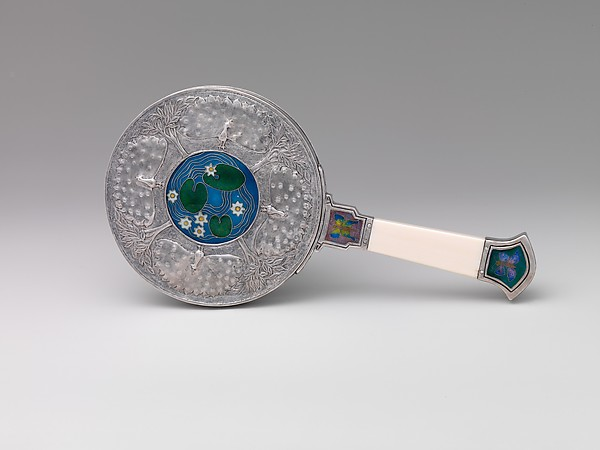
Eda Lord Dixon (American, 1876–1926), Hand mirror, ca. 1908

She first exhibited as Eda Lord Young at the Arts and Crafts Society of Detroit in 1907, and then at the Art Institute of Chicago in 1908.

A silver, ivory, enamel, and glass hand mirror made by Dixon in 1908 is exhibited on Gallery 706 of the Metropolitan Museum of Art, donated by Jacqueline Loewe Fowler in 2014. The same mirror was sold at Sotheby's in 2013 for $25,000. The mirror was originally exhibited at the 7th Annual Arts and Crafts Exhibition, Original Designs for Decorations and Examples of Art Crafts of Distinctive Merit held at the Art Institute of Chicago in 1908. It was exhibited again in 1915 at the Panama–California Exposition in San Diego. It was featured in Palette and Bench, vol. 3 (1909), House Beautiful, vol. 37 (1915) and The New Interior: Modern Decorations for the Modern Home by Hazel Adler (1916). It was bought by art patron George G. Booth who lent it to the Detroit Institute of Arts. When Booth founded the Cranbrook Academy of Art, Bloomfield Hills, Michigan, the hand mirror passed to its collection and then it was sold at Sotheby Parke-Bernet, New York, in 1972 and sold again in 2013.

In 1911, the Boston Society of Arts and Crafts published Handicraft and about Lord they wrote: "for three years a pupil of Alexander Fisher of London, and to her naturally, critical and sensitive taste has been added under his inspiring influence a sound technique founded on the best traditions of the craft."

In 1916 Eda Lord Dixon and her husband Lawrence Belmont Dixon won the top price of $50.00 ($1,172.00 in 2017) assigned by Artists’ Guild of Chicago's exhibition. Always in 1916 they won the Medalist award assigned by the Boston's Society of Arts and Crafts.

In 1922 a chalice in silver and enamel was exhibited at the National Gallery of Art, Washington, D.C.

In 1927 a hand mirror of repousse silver and cloisonne was part of a toilet set of gold and cloisonne sold at the Hudson's Silver Gallery at $200 ($2,728.05 in 2017).

== Personal life ==
On October 9, 1893, Dixon attended the World's Columbian Exposition on "Chicago Day", attended by a total of 716,881. In 1894 she bought the Hermon Atkins MacNeil bronze statue, "Primitive Indian Music".

On December 21, 1896, she first married William Sanborn Young. They divorced after thirteen years of marriage. On July 26, 1909, in Evanston, Illinois, she married Lawrence Belmont Dixon and in 1910 they moved to Riverside, California. In Riverside they managed orange groves and made silverware and jewelry exhibited in Chicago, Detroit, Boston and elsewhere. They had two children: Robert L. Dixon and Richard B. Dixon.

She died on February 14, 1926, and is buried at Lake Forest Cemetery, Lake Forest, Illinois.

== Legacy ==
Her sketch and photographic albums are preserved at the Thomas J. Watson Library at the Metropolitan Museum of Art.

Eda Lord Young Dixon is featured in Hand Wrought Arts & Crafts Metalwork and Jewelry: 1890-1940 by Darcy L. Evon, published in 2013.
