= Myron Hunt =

American architect (1868–1952)

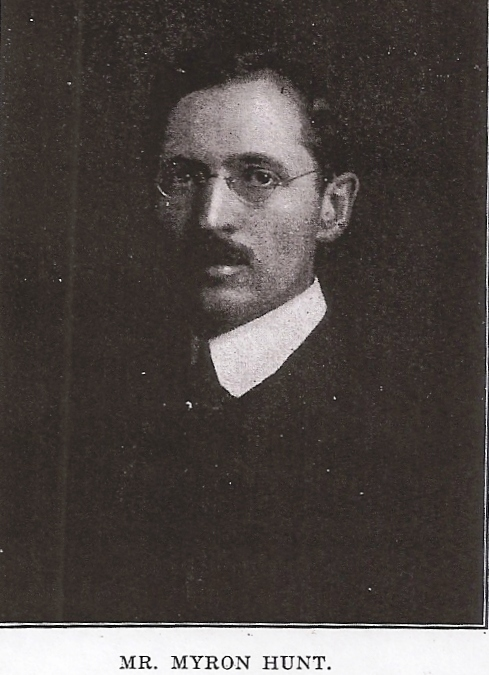
- Born: February 27, 1868; Sunderland, Massachusetts
- Died: May 26, 1952 (aged 84); Port Hueneme, California
- Resting place: San Gabriel Cemetery, San Gabriel, California, U.S.
- Education: Massachusetts Institute of Technology (B.S., Architecture, 1893)
- Occupation: Architect
- Buildings: Huntington Art Gallery; Ambassador Hotel; Rose Bowl

Myron Hubbard Hunt (February 27, 1868 – May 26, 1952) was an American architect whose numerous projects include many noted landmarks in Southern California and Evanston, Illinois. Hunt was elected a Fellow in the American Institute of Architects in 1908.

== Early life and education ==
Hunt was born in Sunderland, Massachusetts, but his family later moved to Chicago where he graduated from Lake View High School in the city's Lakeview district. From 1888 to 1890 he attended Northwestern University, and then returned to Massachusetts to study at MIT between 1890 and 1893. He graduated with a B.S. in Architecture from MIT in 1893. After spending three years in Europe, he returned to Evanston where he obtained a position as draftsman in the local office of the Boston firm of Shepley, Rutan and Coolidge.

He married Harriette Boardman and his son was poet Robert Hunt, long-time partner of Witter Bynner.

== Career ==
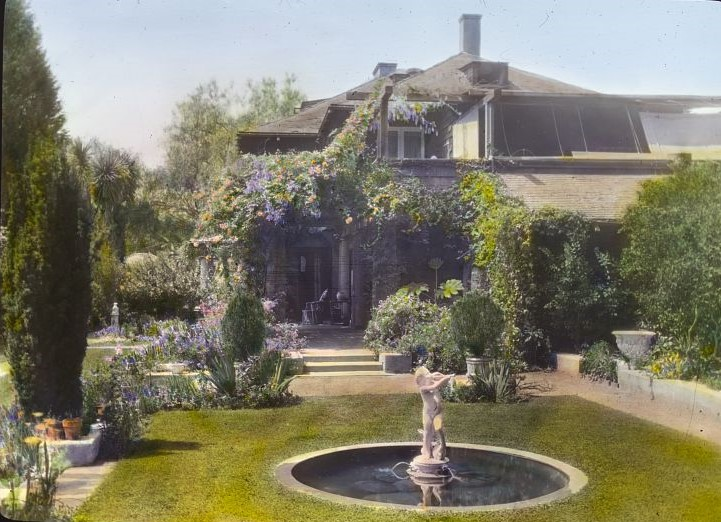
Myron Hunt house, 200 North Grand Avenue, Pasadena, by Frances Benjamin Johnston, 1917. Designed by Myron Hunt, 1905, landscape by Myron Hunt, from 1905. Today the garden does not exist anymore, and the house is a private residence

Hunt is mentioned in the writings of Frank Lloyd Wright and other Chicago architects of the era as an early member of the group which came to be known as the Prairie School, but in 1903 he moved to Los Angeles, where he entered into a partnership with architect Elmer Grey (1871–1963). Opening an office in Pasadena, the firm of Hunt and Grey soon became popular with the well-to-do denizens of that city, who were building many costly houses during that period. Some of the firm's Pasadena work was featured in the national magazine Architectural Record as early as the issue of October, 1906. They were soon designing large houses in communities throughout Southern California including the summer ranch home for cereal magnate Will Keith Kellogg at the present day campus of California State Polytechnic University, Pomona (Cal Poly Pomona).

They also began receiving commissions to design larger projects, including hospitals, schools, churches and hotels. This included work for Throop Institute in Pasadena, the school which would soon become California Institute of Technology. In 1911, they began plans for the new campus of Occidental College in the Eagle Rock district of Los Angeles. (Hunt would be the principal architect of all of Occidental's buildings through 1940.) Another school with which the firm had an association was Pomona College, for which Hunt and Grey designed a master plan of expansion in 1908, and where Hunt designed a concert hall, Bridges Hall of Music, in 1915.

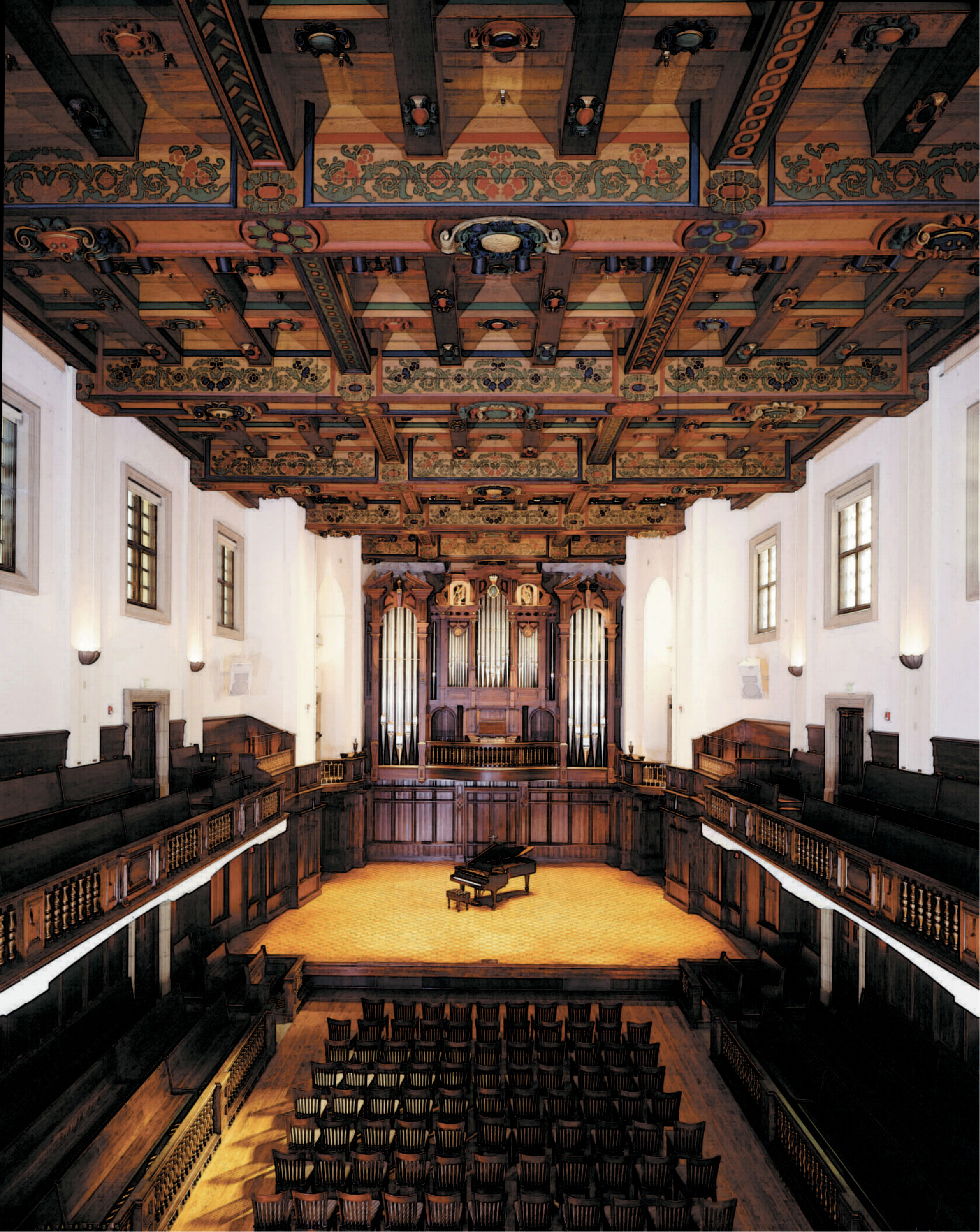
Bridges Hall of Music (1915) at Pomona College has been described as Hunt's masterpiece.

In 1913, Hunt and Grey designed a new wing for the Mission Inn in Riverside, California. They provided designs for the remodeling, expansion, or construction of a number of hotels during the next decade, culminating with the plans for their largest such project, the Ambassador Hotel in Los Angeles, which opened in 1921. Hunt also redesigned Pasadena's Wentworth Hotel, a failed resort hotel in the city's Oak Knoll residential district purchased by Henry E. Huntington in 1911. Rebuilt to Hunt's design, the hotel reopened as the Huntington Hotel in 1914 and was Pasadena's leading hotel for decades thereafter. In 1921, he transformed the Vista Hotel into one of the premier resorts in Pasadena, designing several of the hotel's original bungalows.

Hunt and Grey's association with Henry Huntington had been established a few years earlier when, in 1909, they designed his house in San Marino. With a large addition built in 1934, the house was to become the main art gallery of the cultural center built around the Huntington Library. Later in his career, Hunt would design a new main building for the hospital that bore Huntington's name.

Another Pasadena landmark designed by Hunt is the Rose Bowl. In 1927 Hunt designed a hotel for Senator Frank P. Flint, which was quickly sold to the Biltmore chain of hotels. Due to the Great Depression, the hotel was sold in 1931 to the Dominican Sister of Mission San Jose, who founded Flintridge Sacred Heart Academy, an all-girls' day and boarding high school.

By 1912, Hunt was no longer in partnership with Elmer Grey, but had established a new firm with Los Angeles architect Harold C. Chambers. In this partnership Hunt designed a number of California libraries, including those in Redlands, Palos Verdes Estates (Malaga Cove Library), Santa Barbara, and most notably the Pasadena Central Library, one of the three major civic buildings making up the Pasadena Civic Center District.

In 1913, he designed a building for the Standard Oil Company in Los Angeles which they occupied until 1928 and it became a storage facility. From 1975-1991, the building was occupied by a feminist art center called the Woman's Building and was recommended for Historic-Cultural Monument status in 2018. The report states that the building "embodies the distinguishing characteristics of an architectural-type specimen, inherently valuable for study of a period, style, or method of construction as an excellent and highly intact example of Beaux Arts architecture applied to an industrial building.

Hunt retired to Port Hueneme, California near Berylwood that he designed for the home of Senator Thomas R. Bard. He died there in 1952.

== Myron Hunt projects ==
=== Early career ===
==== In Evanston, Illinois ====
- 1895, 1731 Wesley Avenue, for Charles A. Wightman
- 1896, 1627 Wesley Avenue, his own house
- 1896, 1600-02 Ashland Avenue, for Harvey B. Hurd
- 1897, 1307-13 Ridge Avenue, for Catherine White
- 1897, 1580 Ashland Avenue, for Harvey B. Hurd
- 1897, 1414 Church Street, for George R. Jenkins
- 1897, 1621 Wesley Avenue, for Arthur S. Van Duesen
- 1898, 1570-74 Ashland Avenue, for Harvey B. Hurd
- 1898, 1827 Asbury Avenue, for John R. Woodridge
- 1898, 1330 Church Street, for John Taylor Pirie Jr.
- 1898, 930 Michigan Avenue, for John E. Nolan
- 1898, 1228 Oak Avenue, for William G. Sherer
- 1898, 1217 Ridge Avenue, for Chancellor Livingston Jenks Jr.
- 1898-99, 1401 Davis Street, for Harlow N. Higinbotham
- 1898-99, 1411-15 Davis Street, for Harlow N. Higinbotham
- 1898-99, 1606 Wesley Avenue, for Harlow N. Higinbotham
- 1899, 1140 Forest Avenue, for James A. Lawrence
- 1899, 1032-34 Michigan Avenue, for Nina Drain
- 1901, 815-817 Monroe Street, for Michael L. O'Malia

==== Elsewhere ====
- 1897, apartment buildings Hereford, Boylston, Cambridge
- 1898-99 Phoebe Apperson Hearst Campus Plan Competition for University of California, Berkeley – Hunt Entry.
- 1902, Potter Hotel Santa Barbara, California.
- 1903, 201 Garfield Street, Harvard, Illinois, for Harvard mayor William D. Hall

=== Hunt and Grey (1903–1910) ===
Hunt and Grey, Architects—the partnership firm with Elmer Grey, from 1903 to 1910.

- Mount Wilson Observatory and complex (1904–1913) – for the Carnegie Institution, on Mount Wilson in the San Gabriel Mountains of Southern California.
- James Waldron Gillespie House (design 1902) – Montecito, California. El Fureidis, designed by Bertram Goodhue, was built on site in 1906.
- Myron Hunt house, 200 North Grand Avenue, Pasadena, California (1905)
- Montecito Hot Springs Hotel (1905–1906) – Montecito, California.
- Wentworth Hotel (1905–1907) – Pasadena, California.
- Polytechnic Elementary School (1909) – Pasadena, California.
- Throop Polytechnic Institute, Campus Plan (1907–1908) – present day California Institute of Technology campus, Pasadena, California.
- Westmoreland Place House (1909) – Pasadena, California (with Greene and Greene-designed gates).
- Gartz Court (1910) – Pasadena, California.

=== Myron Hunt office (1910–1920) ===
Myron Hunt, Architect—the firm of Myron Hunt, from 1910 to 1920.

- Mabel Shaw Bridges Hall of Music, "Little Bridges" (1915) – Pomona College, Claremont, California.
- Ambassador Hotel (1919–1921) – Wilshire Boulevard, Los Angeles, California (demolished).
- First Congregational Church of Riverside (1913) – Mission Inn Avenue, Riverside, California.
- Hotel Maryland (1903–1904), Pasadena, California
- The Huntington Hotel – Oak Knoll, Pasadena, California.
- Huntington Mansion (1907–1910) – for Arabella and Henry E. Huntington, San Marino Ranch, San Marino, California.
- Mission Inn “Spanish Wing” addition (1914) – Frank Miller, Riverside, California
- Huntington Library (1919) – Arabella and Henry E. Huntington, San Marino Ranch, San Marino, California.
- Mary Stewart House (1918) – Montecito, California.
- Occidental College – Eagle Rock, Los Angeles, California, master plan; Hunt remained principal architect to 1940.
- Kellogg Ranch – estate residence and equestrian stables near Pomona, California, on present day California State Polytechnic University, Pomona campus.
- Villa Carlotta (1917) – for Anna and Francis Raymond Welles, Altadena, California.
- 1913, 1727 N. Spring Street, Los Angeles, California. Standard Oil Company Sales Department Building.

=== Hunt and Chambers (1920–1947) ===
Hunt and Chambers, Architects—the partnership firm with Harold Coulson Chambers, from 1912 to 1947. Chambers started working with Hunt as a draftsman in 1907, and worked his way to becoming a Partner in 1920.

- San Marcos Hotel (1912–1913) – Chandler, Arizona.
- Amelia Seibert House (1912) – Oak Knoll, Pasadena, California.
- Five Acres (1921) - 760 Mountain View Street in Altadena, California.
- Red Hill Country Club (1922) – Rancho Cucamonga, California.
- 700 Prospect Blvd (1922) – Prospect Historic District.
- Malaga Cove Library—Palos Verdes Public Library and Art Gallery (designed 1923, built 1928–1930), at 2400 Via Campesina, Palos Verdes Estates, California, on the National Register of Historic Places.
- Rose Bowl (1922) - Pasadena, California.
- Pasadena Central Library (1924) – Pasadena Civic Center District, Pasadena, California.
- Point Loma Hotel Project (1924) – Point Loma, San Diego, California.
- La Arcada Plaza (1926) – State Street, Santa Barbara, California.
- County National Bank Building (1924–1927) – Santa Barbara, California.
- Flintridge Biltmore Hotel (1927) – La Cañada Flintridge, California.
- Frederick Law Olmsted Jr. House (1927) – Palos Verdes Estates, California.
- W.S. Weith House (1927) – Beverly Hills, California.
- Redlands Community Hospital (1927) – Redlands, California.
- 100 Los Altos Dr. (1928) – Pasadena, California.
- I. Magnin Department Store (1939) – Wilshire Boulevard, near Bullocks Wilshire, Mid-Wilshire district of Los Angeles, California.
- I. Magnin Department Store (1939) – Wilshire Boulevard, Beverly Hills, California (present day Saks Fifth Avenue).
- Huntington Memorial Hospital (Main Building, 1940) – Pasadena, California.
- Encino Hacienda (1941) – Encino, San Fernando Valley, Los Angeles, California.
