= Eda Lord =

American novelist

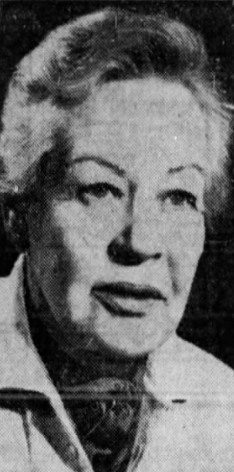
- Eda Lord, January 13, 1972, The Pittsburgh Press
- Born: Eda Hurd Lord; July 30, 1907; Durango, Mexico
- Died: October 22, 1976 (aged 69)
- Education: Stanford University
- Writing career
- Literary movement: Inner Wheel Club

Eda Hurd Lord (July 30, 1907 – October 22, 1976) was an American writer and longtime companion of writer Sybille Bedford.

== Early life ==
Eda Lord was born in Durango, Mexico on July 30, 1907. Her father, Harvey Lord, was managing a mine there, but the family was forced to flee in late 1910 by the Mexican Revolution. She was the granddaughter of Eda Isadore Hurd (1854-1938) and George Sterling Lord (1850-1916). Her aunt was the visual artist Eda Lord Dixon (1876-1926). The novel "Childsplay" is an semi-autobiographical novel recounting in part Lord's life as a child living with her grandmother in Evanston, Illinois.

After her father's death in 1920, she went to live with her grandmother in La Jolla, California, where she attended The Bishop's School and became friends with M. F. K. Fisher.

She attended but did not graduate from Stanford University.

== Career ==
Eda Lord is the author of three auto-biographical novels Childsplay, A Matter of Choosing, and Extenuating Circumstances. She also wrote short stories published in the Paris Review and Harper's Bazaar.

From 1975 to 1976, she was District 12 Chairman of the Inner Wheel Club.

== Personal life ==
Lord moved to France before World War II and was taken prisoner by the Germans for a short period as a citizen of an enemy country.

Lord, openly lesbian, was the longtime companion of Sybille Bedford, with whom she had a 20 years long relationship. According to Quicksands, Bedford's biography, Lord was an alcoholic.

In her book An Alphabet for Gourmets, Mary Frances Kennedy Fisher admitted to have had an early schoolgirl crush on Eda Lord.

She was friends with Barbara Perkins Gamow and some of her letters to Gamow are preserved in the George Gamow and Barbara Gamow Papers at the Library of Congress.

She was a lifelong smoker and contracted throat cancer. Soon after she had hysterectomy surgery for a hemorrhage and in her weakened conditioned died soon after on October 22, 1976.
