= Lake Forest Cemetery =

Cemetery in Illinois, US

- U.S. National Register of Historic Places
- U.S. Historic district
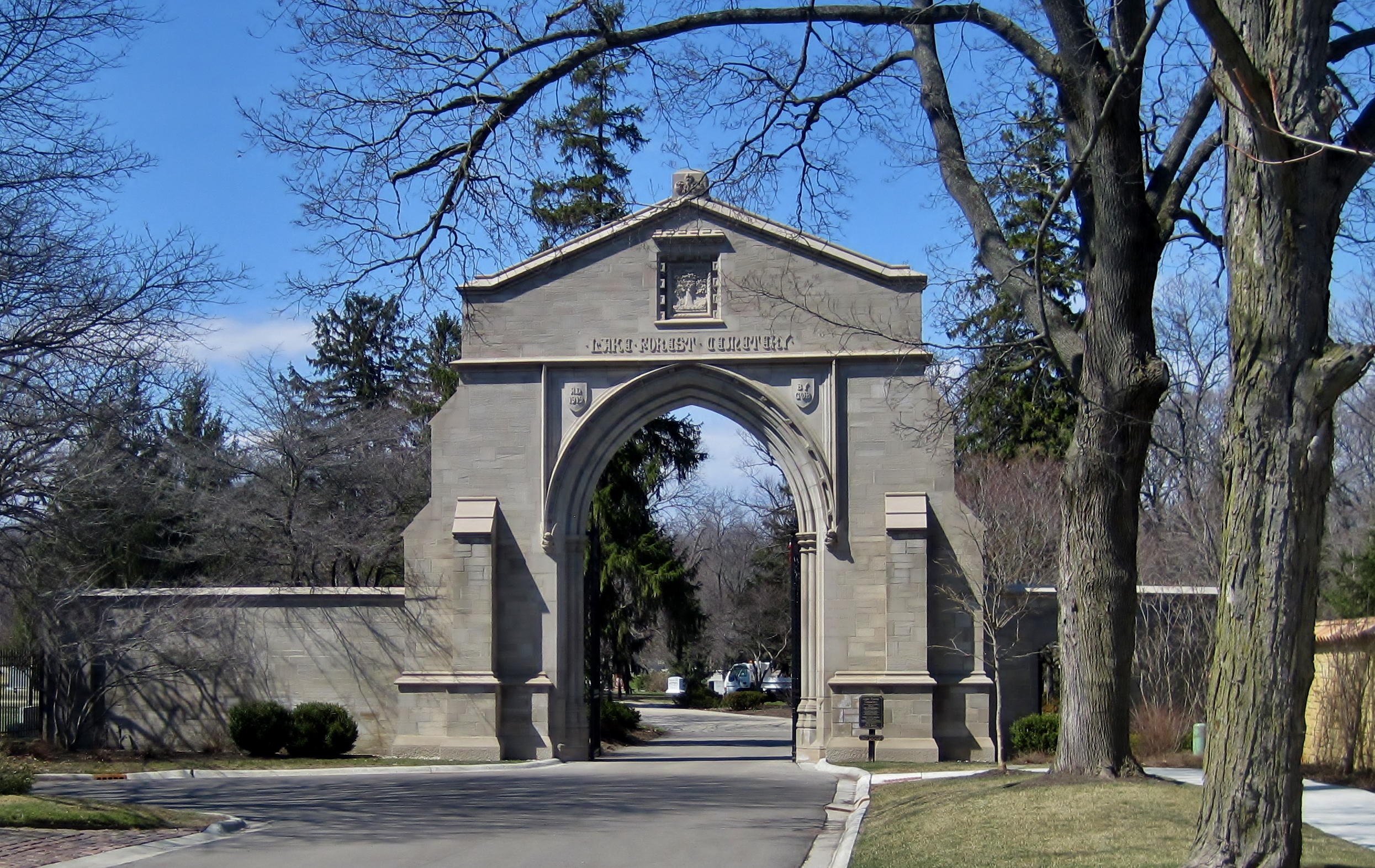
- The Barrell Memorial Gate at the entrance of Lake Forest Cemetery on Lake Avenue

- Location within Illinois Location within the United States
- Location: 1525 North Lake Road, Lake Forest, Illinois
- Coordinates: 42.2677°N 87.8312°W
- Area: 15 acres (6.1 ha)
- Built: 1857
- Architect: Ossian Cole Simonds, Almerin Hotchkiss, William Le Baron Jenney
- Architectural style: Gothic Revival, Classical Revival
- NRHP reference No.: 01000597
- Added to NRHP: May 30, 2001

Lake Forest Cemetery is a rural cemetery in Lake Forest, Illinois, United States. The site was first identified for burial in 1857 when the town of Lake Forest was planned. Later, William Le Baron Jenney designed a winding road system and Ossian Cole Simonds developed the landscape scheme.

== History ==
Overcrowding of church property led to the rural cemetery movement in the mid-19th century. The movement came to the United States in 1831 with the construction of Mount Auburn Cemetery in Massachusetts. In 1857, the Lake Forest Association, a group of business leaders looking to develop a Presbyterian community, purchased a 2,000-acre (810 ha) tract of land north of Chicago, Illinois along Lake Michigan. In an effort to maintain a high standard of public health, the association set aside a portion of the land along the northernmost extremity for use as a cemetery. Landscape architect Almerin Hotchkiss was commissioned to plan the property. He provided easy access to the cemetery from Sheridan Road yet contained it with natural ravines.

On December 11, 1859, the Forest Cemetery Association was founded to oversee the property. Subscriptions were issued to interested parties to fund the cemetery's development. Samuel F. Miller, a civil engineer for the Chicago and Milwaukee Railway, developed a cemetery plan in 1860. However, it provided irregularly shaped lots and a poor roadway scheme. Most plots were too small for the wealthy citizens, so the few large lots were immediately purchased. This left few options that could satisfy potential buyers. The property was transferred to the City of Lake Forest in 1863.

The Lake Forest City Council issued an ordinance creating a cemetery commission on June 6, 1881. They began an official recording of burials in 1882. The commission also decided to completely redesign the property. William Le Baron Jenney was tasked with developing a new roadway system. Jenney was one of the foremost Chicago architects, recently completing the First Leiter Building. He placed the new entrance to the cemetery on Lake Avenue, affording more privacy. He completely reworked the cemetery, designing a curving road system and large lots on treeless fields. Strolling pathways were installed around circles of graves. Jenney also proposed a chapel, but this was never built. The cemetery design was slightly revised in 1892 to accommodate the increased use of automobiles. Also that year, 9 acres (3.6 ha) were donated to the Roman Catholic Archdiocese of Chicago so that Catholics could be buried in the cemetery.

In 1900, Ossian Cole Simonds was commissioned to improve the grounds. Simonds was a friend and former associate of Jenney and was lauded for his work designing Graceland Cemetery in Chicago. His plan provided sewers and drainage, better roadways and walkways, and new burial subdivisions. His Prairie School design utilized native plants and offered increased privacy.

The cemetery is expected to continue to accept burials until around 2050. Since the cemetery is owned by the city, only Lake Forest residents are typically approved for burial.

== Notable burials ==
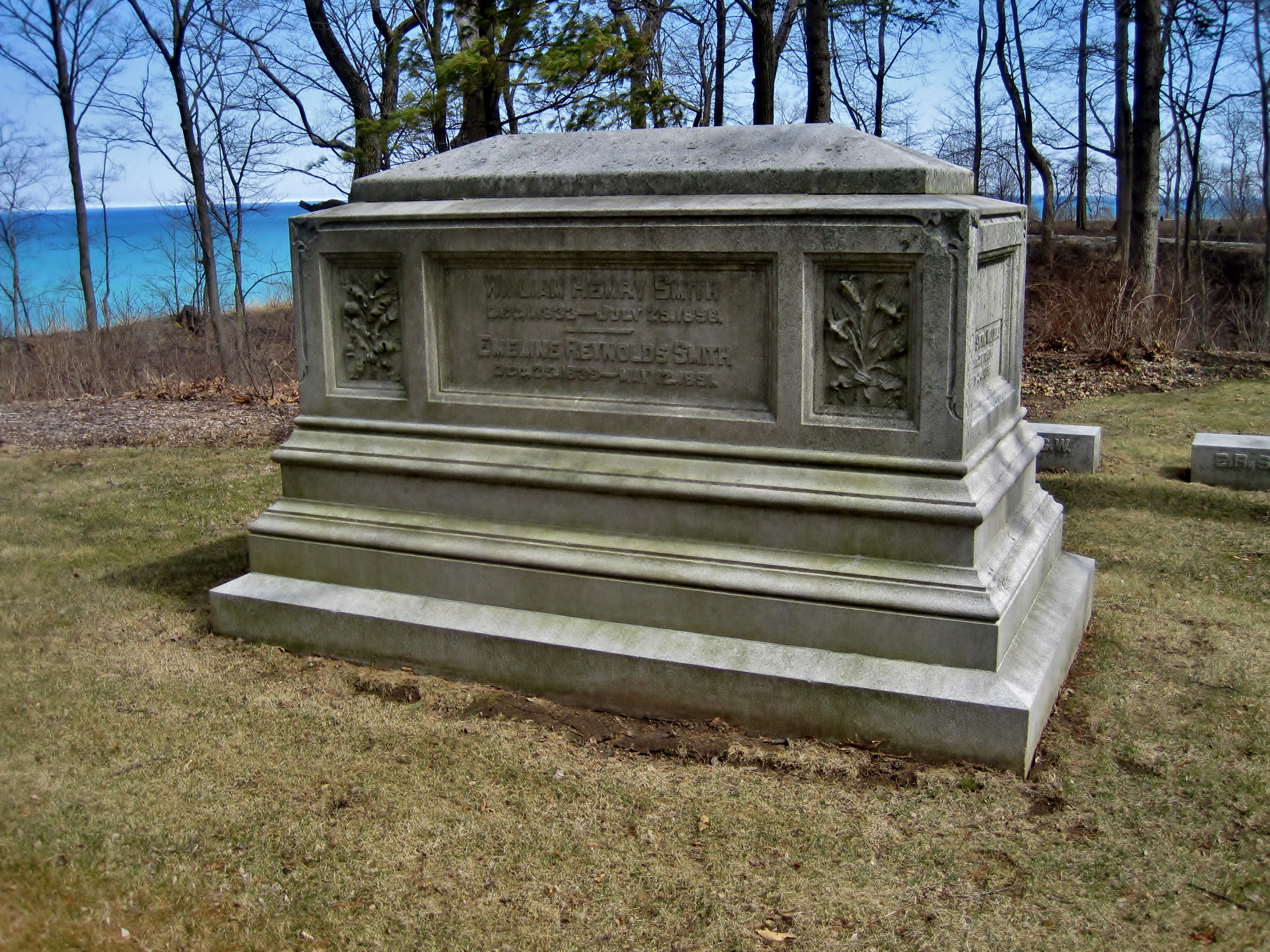
William Henry Smith marker

- Ralph Austin Bard, Under Secretary of the Navy 1944–1945
- Eda Lord Dixon, enamel artist working at the beginning of the 20th century.
- Fred Hayner, baseball pitcher and sportswriter
- John Hughes, film director
- Eda Hurd Lord, businesswoman responsible for the development of Evanston.
- Keith Magnuson, ice hockey defenseman
- Clayton Mark, businessman
- William Proxmire, United States Senator from Wisconsin 1957–1989
- William Henry Smith, 16th Ohio Secretary of State 1833–1896, publisher
- John C. Stetson, Secretary of the Air Force 1977–1979
- Ezra J. Warner, author and historian
- Robert E. Wood, brigadier general and businessman
- Bob Collins, Chicago broadcaster (1942-2000)
