= Eda Station =

Eda Station (江田駅) refers to two railway stations:

- Eda Station (Fukushima), Japan (opened 1948)
- Eda Station (Kanagawa), Japan (opened 1966)
