= A Legacy =

1956 novel by Sybille Bedford

- 1957 UK edition (publ. Weidenfeld & Nicolson); Cover art by Philip Gough
- Author: Sybille Bedford
- Cover artist: Philip Gough
- Language: English
- Published: 1956
- Media type: Print
- Pages: 368
- ISBN: 0141188057

A Legacy is a semi-autobiographical novel by Sybille Bedford first published in 1956. It depicts a fictionalized version of the marriage of her parents and the troublesome relations of their two families. Their familial tumults and tragedies are set in the newly unified Germany. The book explores Prussian militarism in the years approaching the First World War. Many writers, including Victoria Glendinning and Roger Kimball, cite it as evidence of Bedford's underrated brilliance.

== See also ==
- Jigsaw (novel)
