= Kawamae Station =

Railway station in Iwaki, Fukushima Prefecture, Japan

Kawamae Station 川前駅
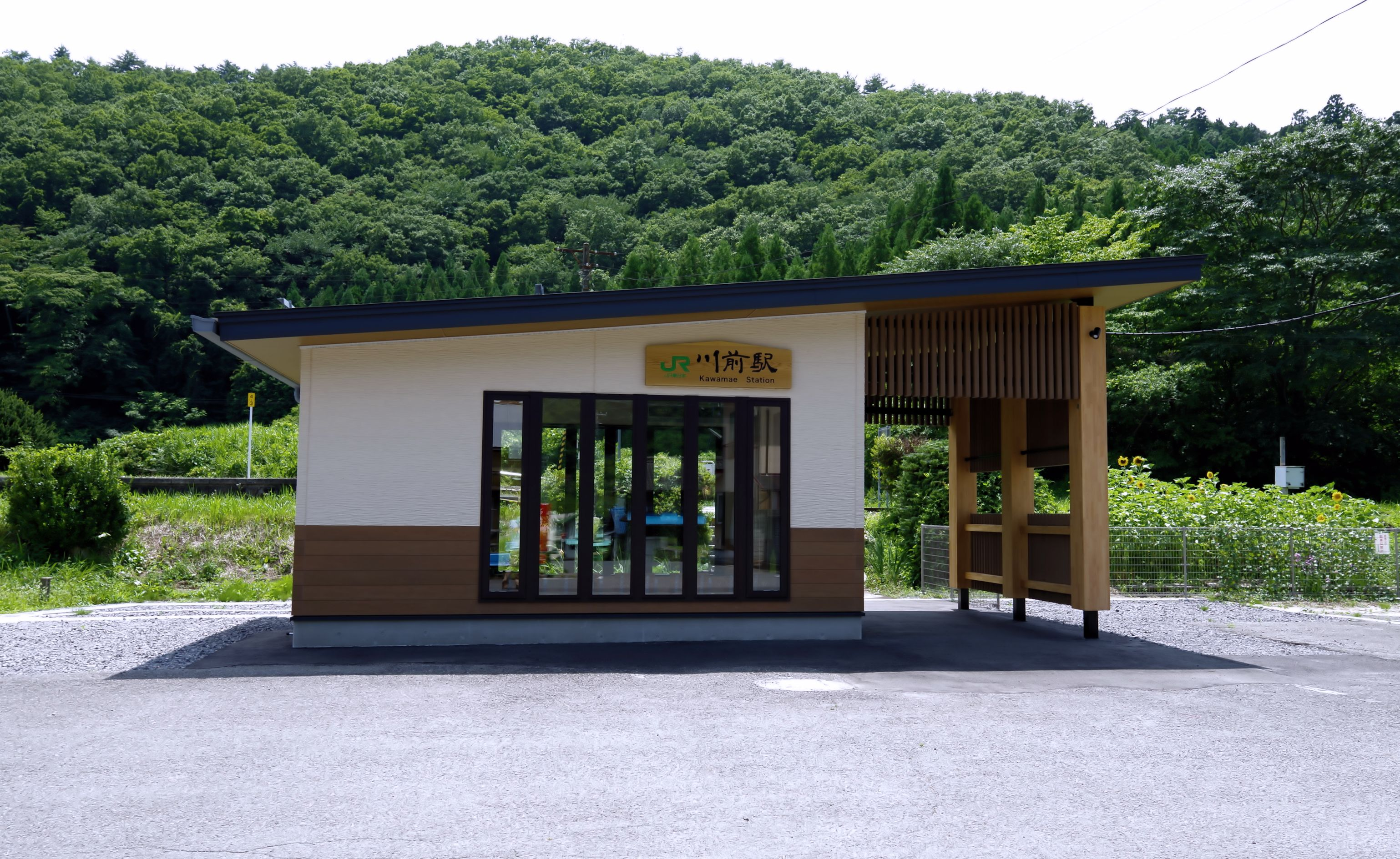
- Kawamae Station in July 2017

General information
- Location: Kawamae-cho Kawamae, Iwaki-shi, Fukushima-ken 979-3201; Japan
- Coordinates: 37.2053°N 140.7505°E
- Operator: JR East
- Line: ■ Ban'etsu East Line
- Distance: 26.3 km from Iwaki
- Platforms: 1 island platform

Other information
- Status: Unstaffed
- Website: Official website

History
- Opened: October 10, 1917

Services
Preceding station	JR East	Following station
Natsui towards Kōriyama	Ban'etsu East Line Local	Eda towards Iwaki
Location
- Location within Fukushima Prefecture Location within Japan

Kawamae Station (川前駅, Kawamae-eki) is a railway station on the Ban'etsu East Line in the city of Iwaki, Fukushima Prefecture, Japan operated by East Japan Railway Company (JR East).

== Lines ==
Kawamae Station is served by the Ban'etsu East Line, and is located 26.3 rail kilometers from the official starting point of the line at Iwaki.

== Station layout ==
The station has a single island platform connected to the station building by a level crossing. The station is unattended.

=== Platforms ===
1	■ Ban'etsu East Line	for Ogawagō and Iwaki
2	■ Ban'etsu East Line	for Miharu and Kōriyama

== History ==
Kawamae Station opened on October 10, 1917. The station was absorbed into the JR East network upon the privatization of the Japanese National Railways (JNR) on April 1, 1987.

== Surrounding area ==
- Natsui River
- Kawamae Post Office

== See also ==
- List of railway stations in Japan
