= Enterprise Desktop Alliance =

Computer technology consortium

The Enterprise Desktop Alliance (EDA) is a consortium of enterprise software vendors, engaged in the promotion of wider usage of Macs, iPhones, and iPads in Windows-dominant environments. The EDA was founded in 2008 and the founding members include: Atempo, Centrify, GroupLogic, LANrev, and Parallels.

The company name was changed to "Enterprise Device Alliance" during September 2011.

== Member Organizations ==
- Absolute Software - Systems Lifecycle Management
- GroupLogic - Mobile File Management, Enterprise File Sharing & Synching, Macintosh File & Print Services, and Managed File Transfer solutions
- Parallels - Run Windows on your Mac
