= Eda Rapoport =

American musician (1890–1968)

- Born: 25 December 1890; Daugavpils, Vitebsk Governorate, Russian Empire
- Died: 9 May 1968 (aged 77); NYC, U.S.
- Occupations: Composer and pianist
- Spouse: Boris Rapoport

Eda Rothstein Rapoport (25 December 1890 – 9 May 1968 in New York City) was a Jewish-American composer and pianist born in the Russian Empire.

== Biography ==
Rapoport was born in Daugavpils, in the Vitebsk Governorate of the Russian Empire (present-day Latvia), into a Jewish family. She emigrated to the United States, where she married noted anesthetist Boris Rapoport (1888–1948) and lived much of her life in New York City.

Rapoport studied composition with Walter Piston, Aaron Copland and Arnold Schoenberg. She composed several hundred works including music for piano, violin, voice and symphony orchestra. In 1943 she presented a program of her own compositions in Carnegie Chamber Music Hall (now Weill Recital Hall), and was also accompanist for her songs.

The Columbia University Department of Music sponsors the Boris and Eda Rapoport Prize in Composition.

== Selected works ==
Several of Rapoport's compositions have been published by Transcontinental Music, White-Smith Music Publishing, Maxwell Weaner, Axelrod Publications, Associated Music Publishers, and El. Cantor Music.

Stage

- The Fisherman and His Wife, Opera-Fantasy in 1 act; libretto after the Grimm's fairy tale
- GI Joe, Opera in 1 act, 3 scenes; libretto by Boris Rapoport
- The Hobo and the Old Maid, Ballet

Orchestral

- Adagietto for strings and flute
- Adagio for string orchestra
- Israfel, Tone Picture after Edgar Allan Poe for flute, string orchestra and harp
- The Mathmid (Hamathmid), Symphonic Poem after Hayim Nahman Bialik
- Miniature Symphony
- Petite Suite for string orchestra
- Revolt in the Warsaw Ghetto, Lament for string orchestra
- Suite for orchestra

1. At the Sea
2. A Starry Night (after Van Gogh)
3. Valse

- Symphonic Dances
- Three Pastels for string orchestra, Op. 12; original for piano solo

1. A Weeping Willow
2. The Boatman
3. In the Garden

Concertante

- Concerto for violin and orchestra
- Concerto for piano and orchestra
- Lamentations for cello and orchestra (1933, revised 1940); original for cello and piano; dedicated to cellist Jean Bedetti

Chamber music

- Agada (Legend) for violin or cello and piano (published 1939)
- Caprice for violin alone
- Arabesque for violin and piano
- Berceuse for violin and piano
- Chant hébraïque for viola or cello and piano, Op. 13 (published 1939)
- The Clown for violin and piano
- Conga for violin and piano
- Echoes from the Forest for violin and piano
- Elegy for cello and piano
- Essay for flute and piano
- Etching for flute and piano
- Explorations for clarinet and piano
- Fantasia for saxophone and piano
- Impressions for solo flute
- Impressions for violin solo or violin and piano
- Indian Legend for flute, oboe, clarinet, horn and bassoon (published 1949)
- Invocation and Caprice for cello and piano
- Kol Nidrei for violin alone
- Lamentations Based on Hebrew Themes for cello and piano (published 1933); also for cello and orchestra
- Legend for violin alone
- Looking Through My Window for violin alone
- Meditation for violin alone
- Melodie for violin and piano
- Midrash for violin and piano (published 1939)
- Moods for cello and piano
- Moods of the Past for violin alone
- Mysterious Forest for flute and string quintet
- Mystique for flute alone
- Nigun (Melody) for violin or cello and piano (published 1939)
- Nocturne in E for violin and piano
- Pastoral Quartet
- Petite Poem for violin and piano
- [2 Pieces] for violin and piano, Op. 21 (published 1941)

1. Berceuse
2. Perpetuum Mobile

- Poem for viola and piano, Op. 14 (published 1939)
- Quartet in G for 2 violins, viola and cello, Op. 16 (published 1939)
- String Quartet on Hebrew Themes for 2 violins, viola and cello (published 1944)
- String Quartet in C major for 2 violins, viola and cello
- String Quartet No. 3 for 2 violins, viola and cello
- Quartet for flute, violin, cello and piano
- Quartet for violin, viola, cello and piano
- Quintet No. 1 for flute and string quartet
- Quintet No. 2 for flute and string quartet
- Rendezvous for violin and piano
- Romanze for violin and piano
- Sea Fog for violin and piano
- Sholom Aleichem Suite for violin and piano
- Sonata for cello and piano
- Sonata No. 2 for violin and piano
- Song and Dance for violin alone
- Song of the Gondolier for violin alone
- Song of the River for cello and piano
- A Study for violin alone
- Thoughts in the Night ... (Harhorëy Lailah) for violin or cello and piano (published 1946); based on a poem by Hayim Nahman Bialik; also for voice and piano
- Trio in A minor

Organ

- Capriccio (with Hammond registration) (published 1947)
- Notturno (with Hammond registration) (published 1947)
- Prelude

Piano

- The Acrobat
- Four Episodes from the Life of Moses
- The House on the Bay
- Rocks and Sea
- Silhouette
- Sonata No. 1
- Sonatina
- Sonata No. 3
- Sonatina No. 4
- Suite for 2 pianos (composed 1941)

1. Out for a Stroll
2. By the Sea
3. Sunset
4. Dance of the Fireflies

- Three Etchings

1. The Old Castle
2. Lake Louise
3. The Grand Canyon

- Three Impressions (published 1943)

1. In the Forest
2. Nocturne
3. The Brook

- Three Pastels, Op. 12 (published 1934); also orchestrated

1. A Weeping Willow
2. The Boatman
3. In the Garden

Vocal

- The Angel for voice and piano
- Drinking Song for voice and piano (published 1945); words from the Russian by Harry Fein
- Five Songs for voice and piano

1. A Little Madness
2. Autumn Leaves
3. Foolish Birds
4. If Plot Is Not
5. To an Air Cadet

- The Raven for voice and string quintet or string orchestra, Op. 15 (published 1939); words by Edgar Allan Poe
- The River for voice and piano (published 1945); words by Paul Eisman
- Sleep, Little Baby for voice and piano (published 1945)
- Thoughts in the Night ... (Harhorëy Lailah) for voice and piano (published 1946); words by Hayim Nahman Bialik; also for violin or cello and piano
- To a Cactus for voice and piano (published 1945); words by Laurette Pizer
- Vacation for voice and piano (published 1945); words by Boris Rapoport
