= Eda C. Martin =

American politician (1902–1982)

- Martin, from a 1958 newspaper
- Born: Eda Ethel Clough; August 17, 1902; Lisbon, New Hampshire, U.S.
- Died: September 25, 1982 (aged 80); Littleton, New Hampshire, U.S.
- Occupations: Politician, state legislator

Eda Ethel Clough Martin (August 17, 1902 – September 25, 1982) was an American politician. She was a Republican, elected to multiple terms in both houses of the New Hampshire state legislature in the 1950s and 1960s.

== Biography ==
Clough was born in Lisbon, New Hampshire, the daughter of Chester Charles Clough and Julia Wallace Clough. She attended Bryant & Stratton College.

Martin was a bookkeeper and office manager by profession. As a widow in her late 40s, she became interested in state politics. Beginning in 1951, she served four terms in the New Hampshire House of Representatives, representing Littleton; she was elected to the New Hampshire Senate in 1958. She was acting president of the Senate on June 12, 1959. She returned to the House in 1960, and was re-elected to a sixth term there in 1962. She returned to the Senate for a second term in 1965, after a close election and a recount.

Clough was an officer of the New Hampshire Owls, an organization for women legislators in the state. She was also a member of the Daughters of the American Revolution, the New Hampshire Mayflower Descendants, and the New Hampshire Historical Society. In 1967 she joined Richard Nixon's campaign committee in New Hampshire.

In 1924, Clough injured her shoulder when she jumped from the third story of a burning building, in the deadly Lawrence Block Fire in Montpelier. She married one of the other survivors of the fire, railroad station agent Claude Nichols Martin, in 1926, after his divorce. Her husband died in 1949, and she died in 1982, at the age of 80, in Littleton.
