= Villa Carlotta (Altadena) =

- U.S. National Register of Historic Places
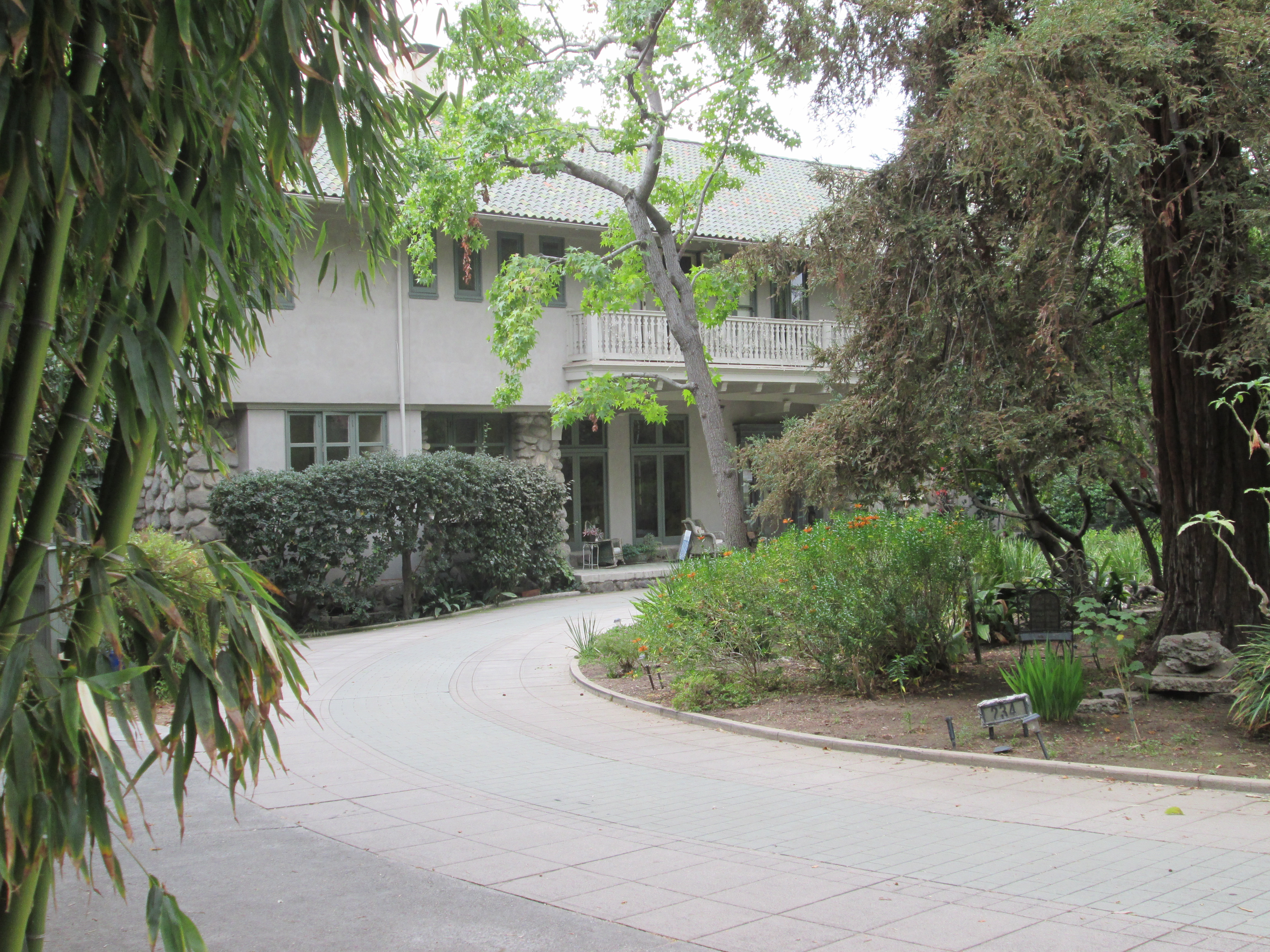
- View of the front of the house

- Location within the Los Angeles metropolitan area
- Location: 234 E. Mendocino Street; Altadena, California
- Coordinates: 34°11′22″N 118°08′40″W
- NRHP reference No.: 14000303
- Added to NRHP: June 17, 2014

Villa Carlotta is a 7,000-square-foot Mission Revival-style house at 234 East Mendocino Street in Altadena, California. It was listed on the National Register of Historic Places in 2014. Completed in 1917, it was one of the first houses in Altadena in which electrical wiring was incorporated into the original architectural plans.

The house was built by Francis Raymond Welles, who hired architect Myron Hunt. Hunt incorporated features of the Welles' family estate in France in the plans for Villa Carlotta, as evidenced by the house's high ceilings and tall windows. It remains a private house.
