= Jigsaw (novel) =

1989 semi-autobiographical novel by Sybille Bedford

- First edition (publ. Hamish Hamilton)
- Author: Sybille Bedford
- Publication date: 1989

Jigsaw: An Unsentimental Education is a 1989 semi-autobiographical novel by Sybille Bedford. It shortlisted for the Booker Prize that year. In many ways a follow-up to her earlier work, A Legacy, it is the story of a girl called Billi as she grows up and experiences sexual, intellectual and emotional awakenings. When Billi's father dies, she leaves behind her childhood in Germany for life with her morphine-addicted mother on the French Riviera.

The novel met with great acclaim when it was published, and Victoria Glendinning and Roger Kimball both cite it as evidence of Bedford's underrated brilliance. It was republished by Eland in 2005, and released in a new edition by Eland in 2012.
