= Eda Ahi =

Estonian poet, translator and diplomat

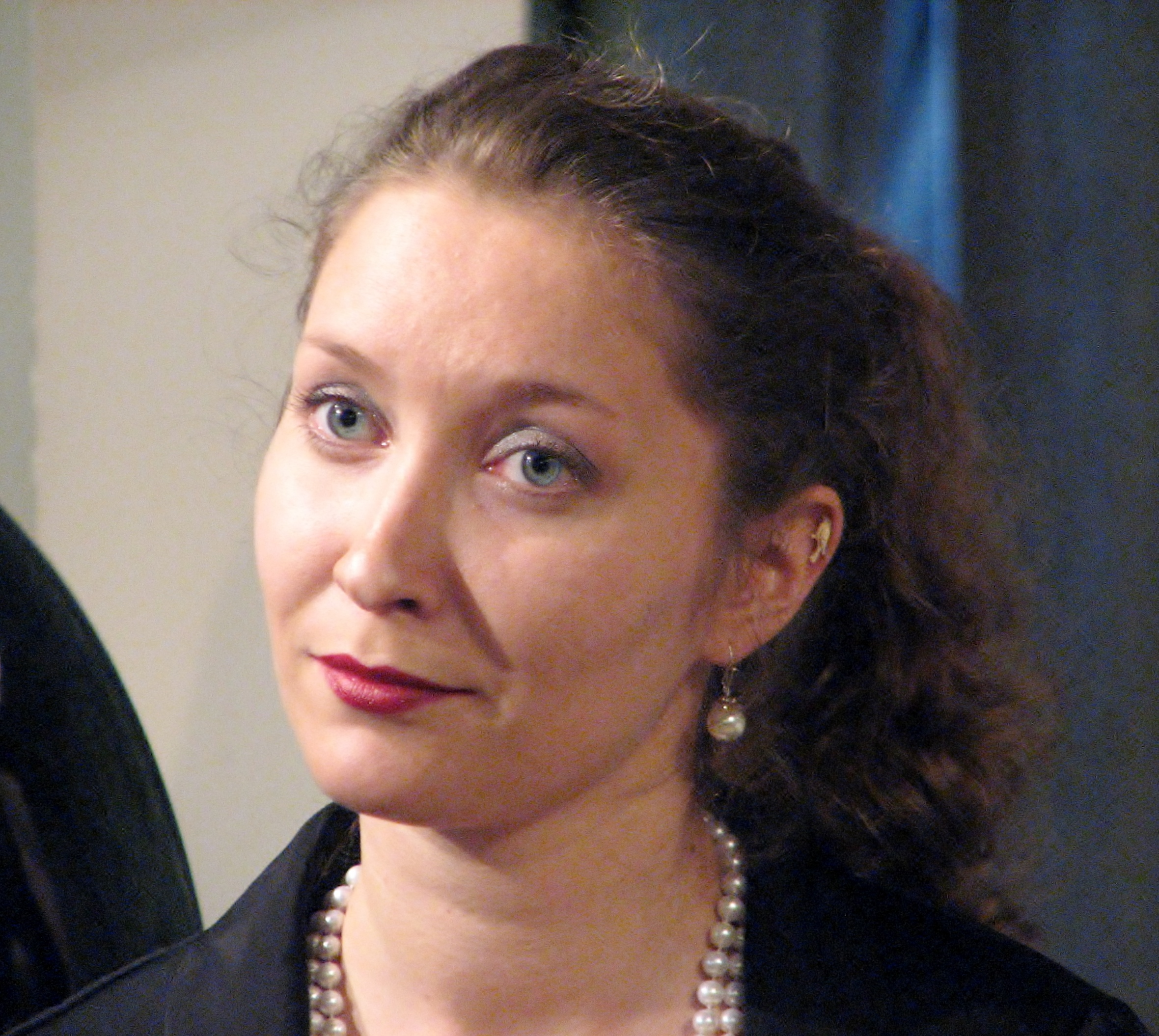
Eda Ahi (2014)

Eda Ahi (born 1 February 1990 in Tallinn) is an Estonian poet, translator and diplomat.

She graduated from Tallinn University, where she received master's degree; specialty was Russian culture. After graduation, she worked as a diplomat in Ukraine.

== Works ==
- 2012 poetry collection Maskiball (Masquerade)
- 2018 poetry collection Sadam (Port)
- 2019 poetry collection Sõda ja rahutus (War and Disorder)
