= Sybille Bedford =

German-born English non-fiction writer (1911–2006)

Sybille Bedford OBE
- Bedford in 1989
- Born: Sybille Aleid Elsa von Schoenebeck; 16 March 1911 Charlottenburg, Kingdom of Prussia, German Empire
- Died: 17 February 2006 (aged 94) London, England, United Kingdom
- Occupation: Novelist, journalist
- Period: 1953–2005

Sybille Bedford, OBE (16 March 1911 – 17 February 2006) was a German-born English writer of non-fiction and semi-autobiographical fiction books. She was a recipient of the Golden PEN Award.

== Early life ==
She was born as Sybille Aleid Elsa von Schoenebeck in the city of Charlottenburg (which was incorporated as a borough of western Berlin in 1920) in the Kingdom of Prussia, to Maximilian Josef von Schoenebeck (1853–1925), a German aristocrat, retired lieutenant colonel and art collector, and his German Jewish wife, Elisabeth Bernhardt (1888–1937). Sybille was raised in the Roman Catholic faith of her father at Castle Feldkirch in Baden. By her father's first marriage to Melanie Herz, Bedford had a half-sister Maximiliane Henriette von Schoenebeck (referred to as 'Jacko' in Quicksands but in real life known as 'Catsy') who became Baroness von Dincklage on her marriage to Hans Günther von Dincklage, a press attaché at the German Embassy in Paris. Bedford's parents divorced in 1918, and she remained with her father, under somewhat impoverished circumstances in the midst of his art and wine collection. He died in 1925, when she was 14 years old, and Sybille went to live in Italy with her mother and stepfather, Norberto Marchesani, an Italian architectural student. During those years she studied in England, lodging in Hampstead.

In the early 1920s, Sybille often travelled between England and Italy. Following the rise of fascism in Italy, her mother and stepfather settled in Sanary-sur-Mer, a small coastal fishing village in Provence in the south of France, near Toulon and Marseille. Sybille herself settled there as a teenager, living near Aldous Huxley, with whom she became friends. Bedford interacted with and was influenced by many of the German writers who settled in the area during that time, including Thomas Mann and Bertolt Brecht. Meanwhile, her mother became addicted to morphine, which had been prescribed by a local physician, and became increasingly dysfunctional.

In 1933, Sybille published an article critical of the Nazi regime in Die Sammlung, the literary magazine of Klaus Mann, the son of Thomas Mann. When her Jewish ancestry was subsequently discovered by the Nazis, her German bank accounts were frozen. At this time it was difficult for her to renew her German passport, and staying in Italy without a valid passport or a source of income carried the risk of being deported to Germany. Aldous Huxley's wife Maria came up with a solution in 1935. Maria is known to have said, on the question of who should marry Sybille, "We need to get one of our bugger friends." Sybille entered a marriage of convenience with an English Army officer, Walter "Terry" Bedford (an ex-boyfriend of a former manservant of W. H. Auden's), whom she described as a friend's "bugger butler", and obtained a British passport. The marriage ended shortly thereafter, but Sybille took her husband's surname, publishing all of her later work as Sybille Bedford.

With assistance from Aldous and Maria Huxley, Bedford left France for America in advance of the German invasion of 1940. She followed the Huxleys to California and spent the rest of World War II in the United States.

== Career as a writer ==
After the war, Bedford spent a year travelling in Mexico. Her experiences on that trip would form the basis of her first published book, a travelogue entitled The Sudden View: a Mexican Journey, which was published in 1953. Bedford spent the remainder of the 1940s living in France and Italy. During this time she had a love affair with an American woman, Evelyn W. Gendel, who left her husband for Bedford and became a writer and editor herself. In the 1950s Bedford became Martha Gellhorn's confidante.

A Legacy, Bedford's second book and first novel, was published in 1956 and televised by the BBC in 1975. It was described by Francis King as "one of the great books of the 20th century". Evelyn Waugh wrote in a letter to Nancy Mitford, "I wondered who this brilliant 'Mrs Bedford' could be. A cosmopolitan military man, plainly, with a knowledge of parliamentary government and popular journalism, a dislike of Prussians, a liking for Jews, a belief that everyone speaks French in the home..." Though outwardly a work of fiction, it was somewhat autobiographical – it presents a stylised version of her father's life in Germany, as well as some of the author's early childhood there. It was a success and enabled Bedford to continue writing. In her lifetime, three more novels were published, as well as numerous works of non-fiction. In non-fiction she was best known as a travel writer and a legal reporter.

In 1945 she met Esther Murphy, who would become her lover. The relationship lasted only a few years, but they remained lifelong friends.

Bedford spent the 1950s, the 1960s and the 1970s living in France, Italy, Britain and Portugal, and during that period had a twenty-year relationship with the American female novelist Eda Lord. In 1979 she settled in Chelsea, London. In 1981 she was appointed an Officer of the Order of the British Empire. She worked for PEN, was a fellow of the Royal Society of Literature, and in 1994 became a Companion of Literature. Bedford's final work was Quicksands, a memoir published in 2005. A biography by Selina Hastings Sybille Bedford: An Appetite for Life was published in 2020.

== Awards and honours ==
- 1993 Golden PEN Award

== Works ==
- The Sudden View: a Mexican Journey, 1953 – a travelogue. It was republished by William Collins in 1960 as A Visit to Don Otavio: a Traveller's Tale from Mexico, then republished again, as A Visit to Don Otavio: a Mexican Odyssey, by Eland in 1982.
- A Legacy, 1956 – her first novel, inspired by the author's early years and the milieu in which she was raised. With wit and insight the novel traces the overlapping worlds of refined and idle German aristocrat Julius von Felden and the wealthy Jewish Merz family into which he marries. It is set in the south of France, Paris, Spain, Berlin and the German countryside at the beginning of the 20th century.
- The Best We Can Do: (The Trial of Dr Adams), 1958 – an account of the murder trial of suspected serial killer John Bodkin Adams
- The Faces of Justice: A Traveller's report, 1961 – a description of the legal systems of England, Germany, Switzerland, and France
- A Favourite of the Gods, 1963 – a novel about an American heiress who marries a Roman prince
- A Compass Error, 1968 – a sequel to the above, describing the love affairs of the daughter of that work's protagonist
- Aldous Huxley: A biography, 1973 – the standard, authorised biography
- Jigsaw: An Unsentimental Education, 1989 – a follow-up to A Legacy, inspired by the author's experiences living in Italy and France with her mother
- As It Was: Pleasures, Landscapes and Justice, 1990 – a collection of magazine pieces on various trials, including the censorship of Lady Chatterley's Lover, the trial of Jack Ruby, and the Auschwitz trial, as well as pieces on food and travel
- Pleasures and Landscapes: A Traveller's Tales from Europe – a reissue of the previous, removing the legal writings and including two additional travel essays
- Quicksands: A Memoir, 2005 – a memoir of the author's life, from her childhood in Berlin to her experiences in postwar Europe
