= Eda Station (Fukushima) =

Railway station in Iwaki, Fukushima Prefecture, Japan

Eda Station 江田駅
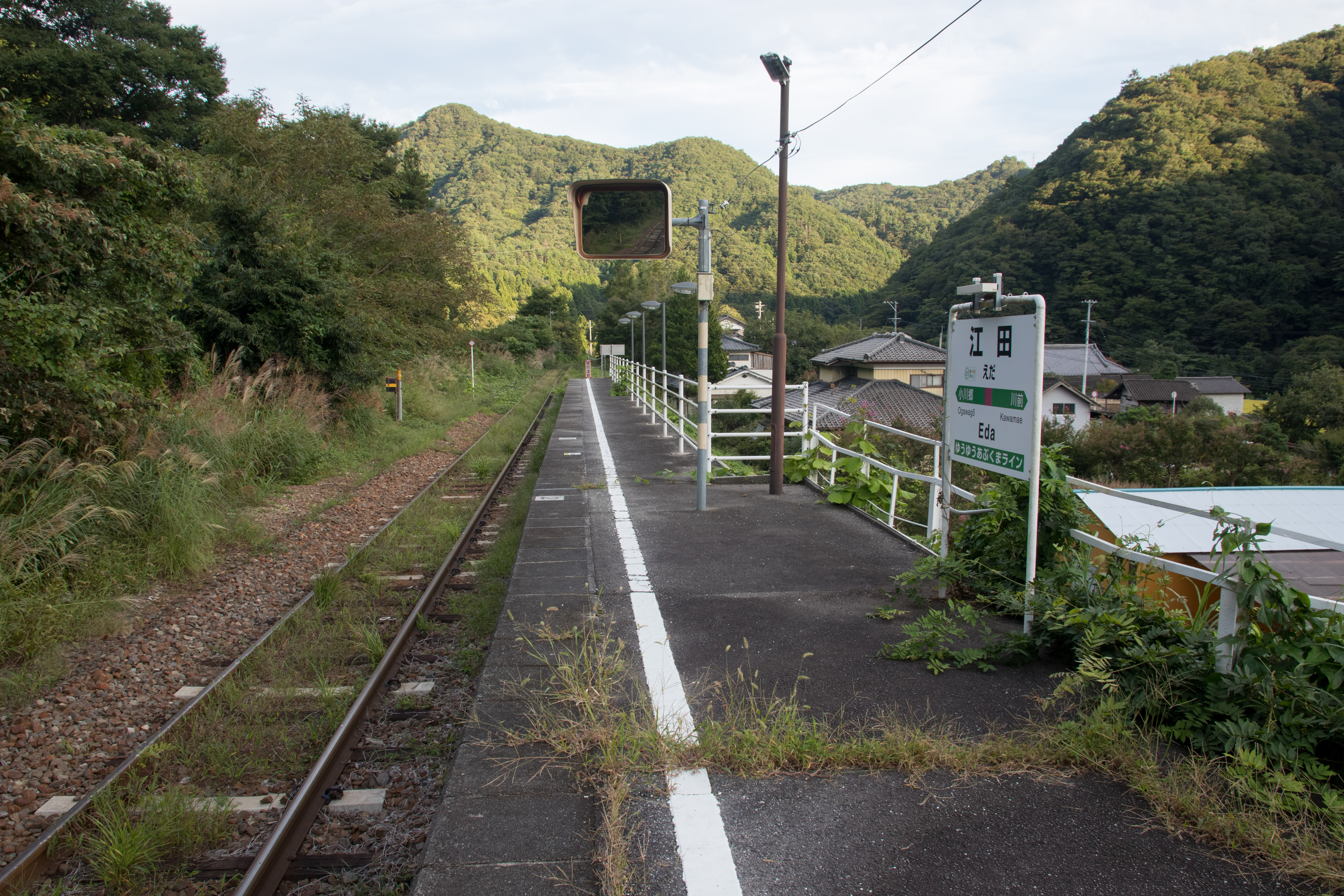
- Eda Station in September 2018

General information
- Location: 44 Ogawa-cho Kamiogawa Eda, Iwaki-shi, Fukushima-ken 979-3124; Japan
- Coordinates: 37.1796°N 140.8257°E
- Operator: JR East
- Line: ■ Ban'etsu East Line
- Distance: 18.3 km from Iwaki.
- Platforms: 1 side platform
- Tracks: 1

Other information
- Status: Unstaffed
- Website: Official website

History
- Opened: 10 October 1948

Services
Preceding station	JR East	Following station
Kawamae towards Kōriyama	Ban'etsu East Line Local	Ogawagō towards Iwaki
Location
- Location within Fukushima Prefecture Location within Japan

Eda Station (江田駅, Eda-eki) is a railway station in the city of Iwaki, Fukushima Prefecture, Japan, operated by East Japan Railway Company (JR East).

== Lines ==
Eda Station is served by the Banetsu East Line, and is located 18.3 kilometers from the official starting point of the line at Iwaki.

== Station layout ==
The station has one side platform serving a single bi-directional track. The station is unattended.

== History ==
Eda Station opened on October 10, 1948. The station was absorbed into the JR East network upon the privatization of Japanese National Railways (JNR) on April 1, 1987.

== Surrounding area ==
The station is located in an isolated, rural area, with a few houses nearby.

== See also ==
- List of railway stations in Japan
