= Eda IF =

Swedish sports club

- Full name: Eda idrottsförening
- Sport: soccer, floorball ski jumping (earlier)
- Founded: November 1941
- Based in: Eda, Sweden
- Arena: Älvvallen (soccer)

Eda IF is a sports club in Eda, Sweden, established in November 1941 as a ski jumping and soccer club.

The women's soccer team, which was started in 1974, played in the Swedish top division in 1982.

In 2007, the club began to play floorball.
