= Edla Lyytinen =

Finnish politician

Edla Lyytinen (née Julkunen; 1 October 1874 – 21 May 1919) was a Finnish politician, born in Kuopion maalaiskunta. She was a Member of the Parliament of Finland for a short time in 1919, from 1 April until her death on 21 May 1919.
