= Eda (surname) =

Eda is a Japanese surname that may refer to:

- Katsuya Eda (江田 勝哉), mathematician specializing in set theory and algebraic topology
- Kenji Eda (江田 憲司, born 1956), independent Japanese politician
- Ryoko Eda (江田 良子, born 1976), Japanese marathon runner
- Saburō Eda (江田 三郎, 1907–1977), Japanese politician
- Satsuki Eda (江田 五月, 1941–2021), Japanese politician
- Toshiji Eda (江田 利児, born 1937), Japanese rower
- Yasuyuki Eda (江田 康幸, born 1956), Japanese politician in the New Komeito Party
