= Edda (given name) =

Edda is a feminine given name which may refer to:

- Edda Adler (born 1937), Argentine chemist and biologist
- Edda Albertini (1926–1988), Italian actress
- Edda Heiðrún Backman (1957–2016), Icelandic actress, voice actress, singer, painter and director
- Edda Björgvinsdóttir (born 1952), Icelandic actress, comedian, writer and director
- Edda Bresciani (born 1930), Italian Egyptologist
- Edda Buding (1936–2014), German tennis player
- Edy Campagnoli (1934–1995), Italian television personality and actress Edda Campagnoli
- Edda Ceccoli (born 1947), Captain Regent of San Marino from 1991 to 1992
- Edda Dell'Orso (born 1935), Italian singer
- Edda Fabbri (born 1949), Uruguayan writer
- Edda Ferronao (1934–1986), Italian actress
- Edda Garðarsdóttir (born 1979), Icelandic football coach and former player
- Edda Göring (1938–2018), German politician, only child of Hermann Göring
- Edda Magnason (born 1984), Swedish singer-songwriter, musician and film actress of Icelandic descent
- Edda Moser (born 1938), German soprano
- Edda Mussolini (1910–1995), eldest child of Benito Mussolini
- Edda Mutter (born 1970), German alpine skier
- Edda Renouf (born 1943), American painter and printmaker
- Edda Seippel (1919–1993), German actress
- Edda Soligo (1905–1984), Italian actress
