= Harvey B. Hurd =

American lawyer

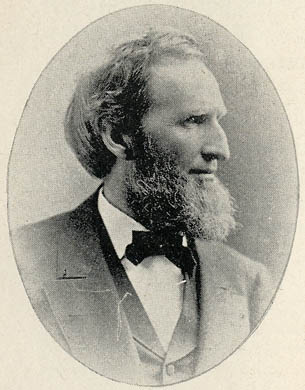
Harvey B. Hurd

Harvey Bostwick Hurd (February 14, 1828 – January 20, 1906) was a prominent Chicago lawyer, abolitionist, and social reformer.

== Early life and education ==
Hurd was born in Huntington, Connecticut on February 14, 1828. He grew up on his family's farm. On May 1, 1842, the fourteen-year-old Hurd left his parents' farm and journeyed to Bridgeport, Connecticut, where he became an apprentice at the Bridgeport Standard, a Whig newspaper. In 1844, he was one of a group of ten young men who immigrated to Illinois. He spent a year studying at Jubilee College in Peoria County, Illinois. He then moved to Chicago, finding a job at the Evening-Standard newspaper and later the Prairie Farmer. In 1847, he read law with Chicago lawyer Calvin DeWolf. He was admitted to the bar of Illinois in 1848.

== Career ==
Hurd began practicing law in 1848, initially forming a partnership with Carlos Haven, then with Henry Snapp, and then, from 1850 to 1854, with Andrew J. Brown. With Brown, Hurd was involved in several large real estate transactions in Evanston, Illinois.

In May 1853, Hurd married Cornelia A. Hilliard, daughter of Col. James Hilliard of Middletown, Connecticut. Together, the couple had three daughters: Eda, Hettie, and Nellie. In 1854, he began construction of a large home in Evanston, where he lived for the rest of his life. He served as first president of the Village Board of Evanston.

A committed abolitionist, Hurd was active in abolitionist politics in Chicago. When the Kansas–Nebraska Act of 1854 repealed the Missouri Compromise, Hurd traveled to Buffalo, New York for the founding of a national committee to protect the rights of northern settlers in the Kansas Territory. Hurd served as the secretary of this organization's executive committee, which was headquartered in Chicago. After the Kansas crop failures of 1856, this committee voted to raise funds to send seed to northern settlers in the Kansas Territory, and to provide John Brown with $5,000 to fund his activities. When there were not enough funds for both projects, Hurd decided to spend the money on seed for the settlers, a decision that ultimately upset Brown and drew criticism from Gerrit Smith, but which was vindicated when the seed arrived in Lawrence, Kansas. In the absence of this seed, the northern settlers would have had no choice but to leave the Kansas Territory. In the wake of the Pottawatomie Massacre, John Brown was forced to flee the Kansas Territory. While Brown was staying at the home of John W. Jones, his clothes were so ragged that he needed a new suit; since Hurd was approximately the same size as Brown, Hurd was fitted for the suit which was then sent to Brown.

In 1862, Hurd formed a law partnership with Henry Booth and also became a lecturer on law at the University of Chicago. His partnership with Booth was dissolved in 1868, at which time Hurd ceased the active practice of law. In April 1869, Governor of Illinois John M. Palmer appointed Hurd as one of three commissioners to revise the General Statutes of Illinois. When the other two commissioners were indisposed, Hurd completed this task on his own, presented his compiled statutes to the Illinois General Assembly in 1874. The General Assembly ordered this compilation to be published - in its published form, it was generally known as Hurd's Statutes.

Hurd became a lecturer at the Union College of Law (later known as the Northwestern University School of Law in 1876. In 1886, Hurd was the author of the so-called Hurd Bill, which proposed to create the Sanitary District of Chicago; after studying and modifying the bill, the Illinois General Assembly passed it the next year.

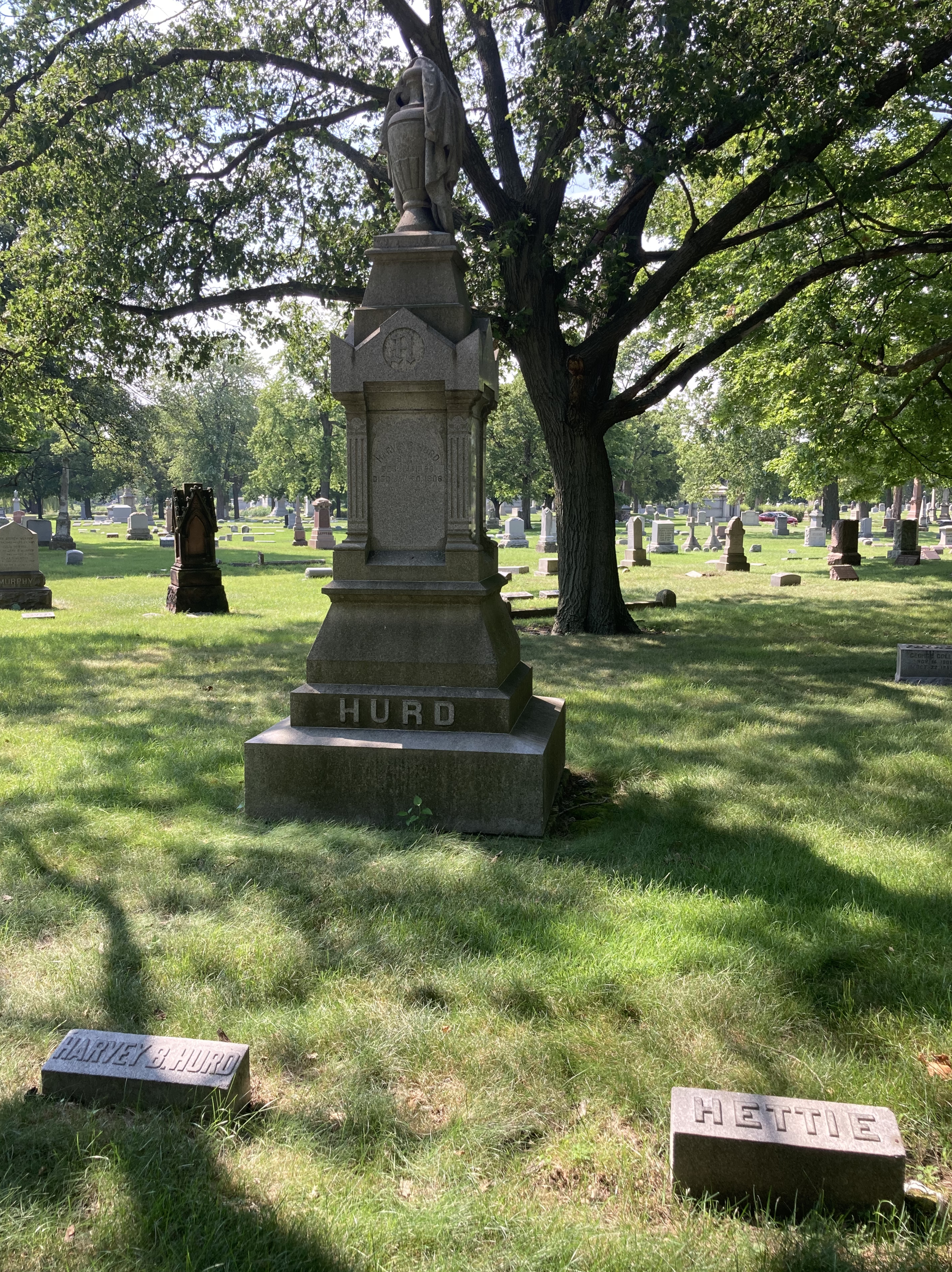
Hurd's grave at Rosehill Cemetery

Hurd was active in the Illinois State Bar Association, serving as chairman of its Committee on Law Reform. He chaired an ISBA commission on land title that on December 10, 1892, recommended that Illinois adopt the Torrens title system, which it did in 1897. Hurd was president of the Illinois State Bar Association 1898-99.

Hurd was also active in the Children's Aid Society of Chicago. He was a long-time proponent of creating a juvenile court system in Illinois, and remained active after the court was created.

== Personal life ==
Hurd's first wife, Cornelia, died in 1884. He later married Mrs. Sarah Collins, widow of George Collins. She died in 1890. In July 1892, Hurd took a third wife, Mrs. Susanna Van Wyck. She died in 1896.

Hurd died at his home in Chicago on January 20, 1906, and was buried at Rosehill Cemetery.
