= 1909 San Diego mayoral election =

- April 6, 1909
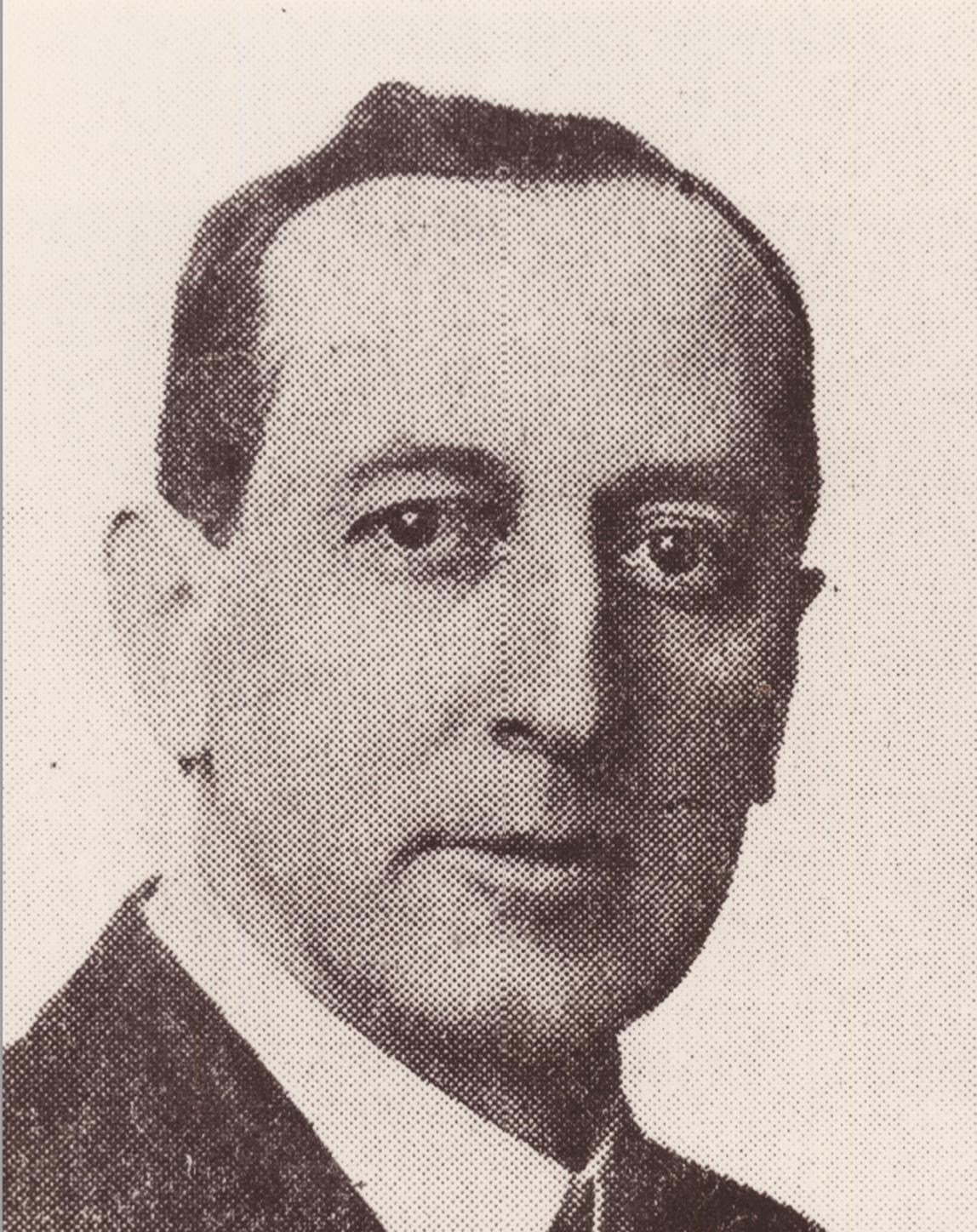

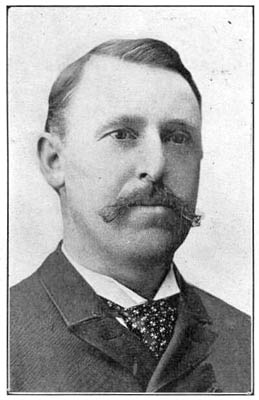
| Nominee | Grant Conard | John F. Forward Sr. |
| Party | Republican | Republican |
| Popular vote | 3,606 | 3,158 |
| Percentage | 53.3% | 46.7% |
Mayor before election
John F. Forward Sr.
Republican
Elected mayor
Grant Conard
Republican

The 1909 San Diego mayoral election was held on April 6, 1909, to elect the mayor for San Diego. Incumbent Mayor John F. Forward Sr. and Grant Conard received the most votes in the primary election and advanced to the runoff. Conard was then elected mayor with a majority of the votes.

== Candidates ==
- John F. Forward Sr., mayor of San Diego
- Grant Conard, 1907 mayoral candidate
- W.J. Kirkwood, 1905 mayoral candidate

== Campaign ==
Incumbent Mayor John F. Forward Sr. stood for reelection on the Republican ticket. Grant Conard, who was previously the runner up in the 1907 election, once again challenged Forward as a Republican running a non-political campaign. Also contesting the race was W.J. Kirkwood, a Socialist.

The 1909 election was the first to be held in San Diego using the primary election system. On March 23, 1909, Forward and Conard received the two highest vote totals and advanced to the general election. Conard was then elected mayor on April 6, 1909, with a majority of the votes in the runoff.

== Primary Election results ==
San Diego mayoral primary election, 1909
| Party | Candidate | Votes | % |
|---|---|---|---|
| Republican | John F. Forward Sr. (incumbent) | 2,356 | 40.4 |
| Republican | Grant Conard | 2,265 | 38.9 |
| Socialist | W.J. Kirkwood | 1,206 | 20.7 |
| Total votes | | 5,827 | 100 |

== General Election results ==
San Diego mayoral general election, 1909
| Party | Candidate | Votes | % |
|---|---|---|---|
| Republican | Grant Conard | 3,606 | 53.3 |
| Republican | John F. Forward Sr. (incumbent) | 3,158 | 46.7 |
| Total votes | | 6,764 | 100 |
