= 1913 San Diego mayoral election =

- April 8, 1913
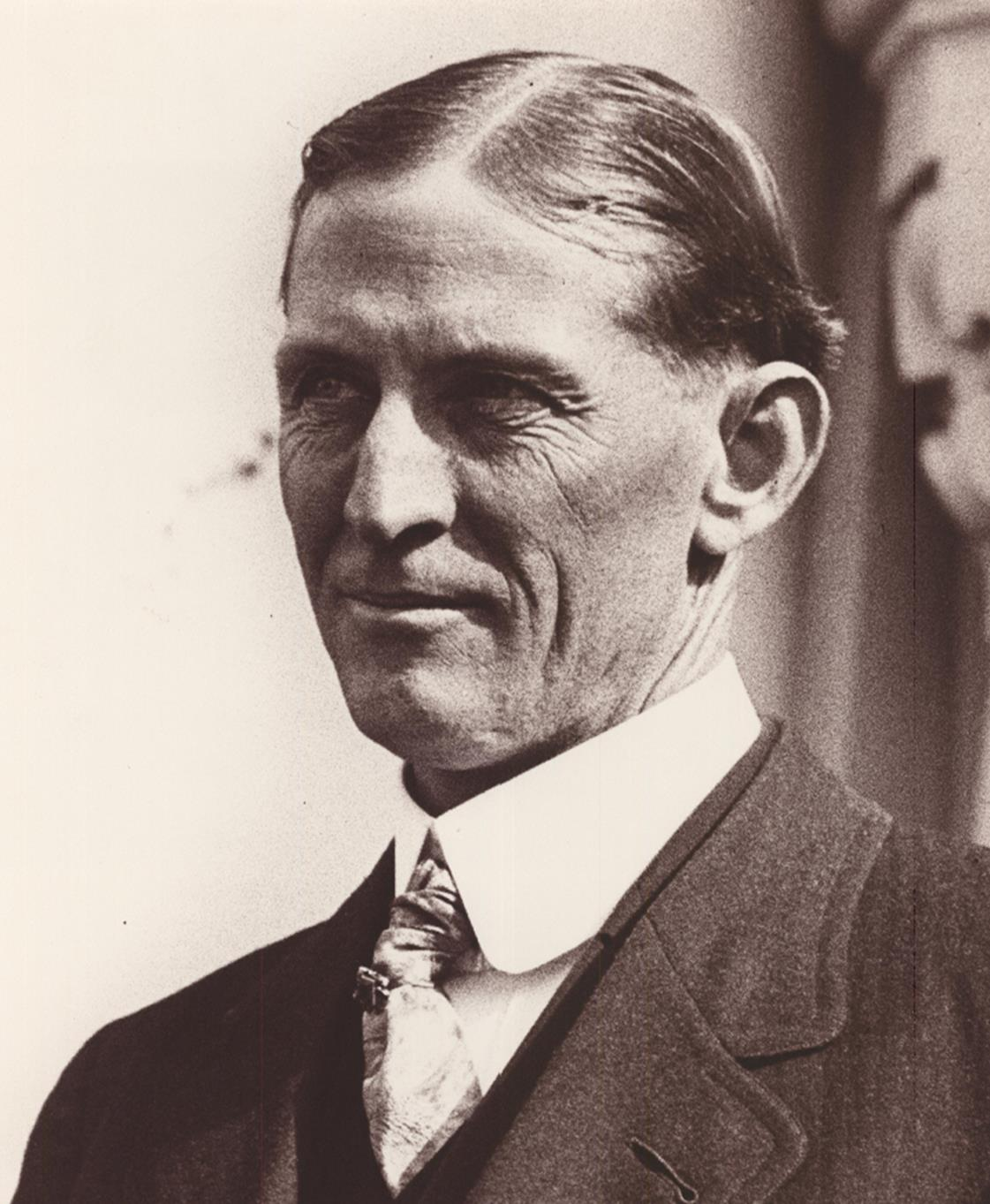

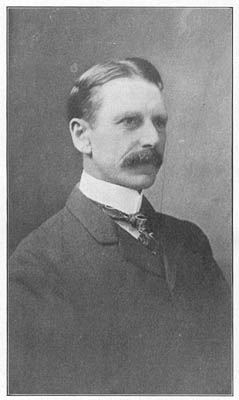
Nominee	Charles F. O'Neall	George Marston
Party	Republican	Progressive
Popular vote	7,943	7,266
Percentage	52.2%	47.8%
Mayor before election
James E. Wadham
Democratic
Elected mayor
Charles F. O'Neall
Republican

The 1913 San Diego mayoral election was held on April 8, 1913, to elect the mayor for San Diego. Charles F. O'Neall and George Marston received the most votes in the primary election and advanced to the runoff. O'Neall was then elected mayor with a majority of the votes.

== Candidates ==
- Charles F. O'Neall, real estate agent
- George Marston, department store owner
- Jacob Beckel, President of the Federated Trades

== Campaign ==
Incumbent Mayor James E. Wadham chose not to run for re-election to focus on his legal business and at the urging of his wife. Contestants for the open seat included Charles F. O'Neall, a Republican, George Marston, a Progressive running as a non-partisan candidate, and Jacob Beckel, a Socialist.

In the campaign, Marston emphasized projects that would lead to a beautiful and prosperous city, including harbor improvements, a new dry dock, a navy center and a railroad to Arizona. O'Neall emphasized the importance of developing commerce and industry over public parks and recreation.

On March 25, 1913, O'Neall and Marston received the two highest vote totals in the primary and advanced to the general election. O'Neall was then elected mayor on April 8, 1913, with a majority of the votes in the runoff.

== Primary Election results ==
San Diego mayoral primary election, 1913
Party	Candidate	Votes	%
Republican	Charles F. O'Neall	6,863	49.9
Progressive	George Marston	4,824	35.1
Socialist	Jacob Beckel	2,057	15.0
Total votes		13,744	100

== General Election results ==
San Diego mayoral general election, 1913
Party	Candidate	Votes	%
Republican	Charles F. O'Neall	7,943	52.2
Progressive	George Marston	7,266	47.8
Total votes		15,209	100
