= 1911 San Diego mayoral election =

- April 4, 1911
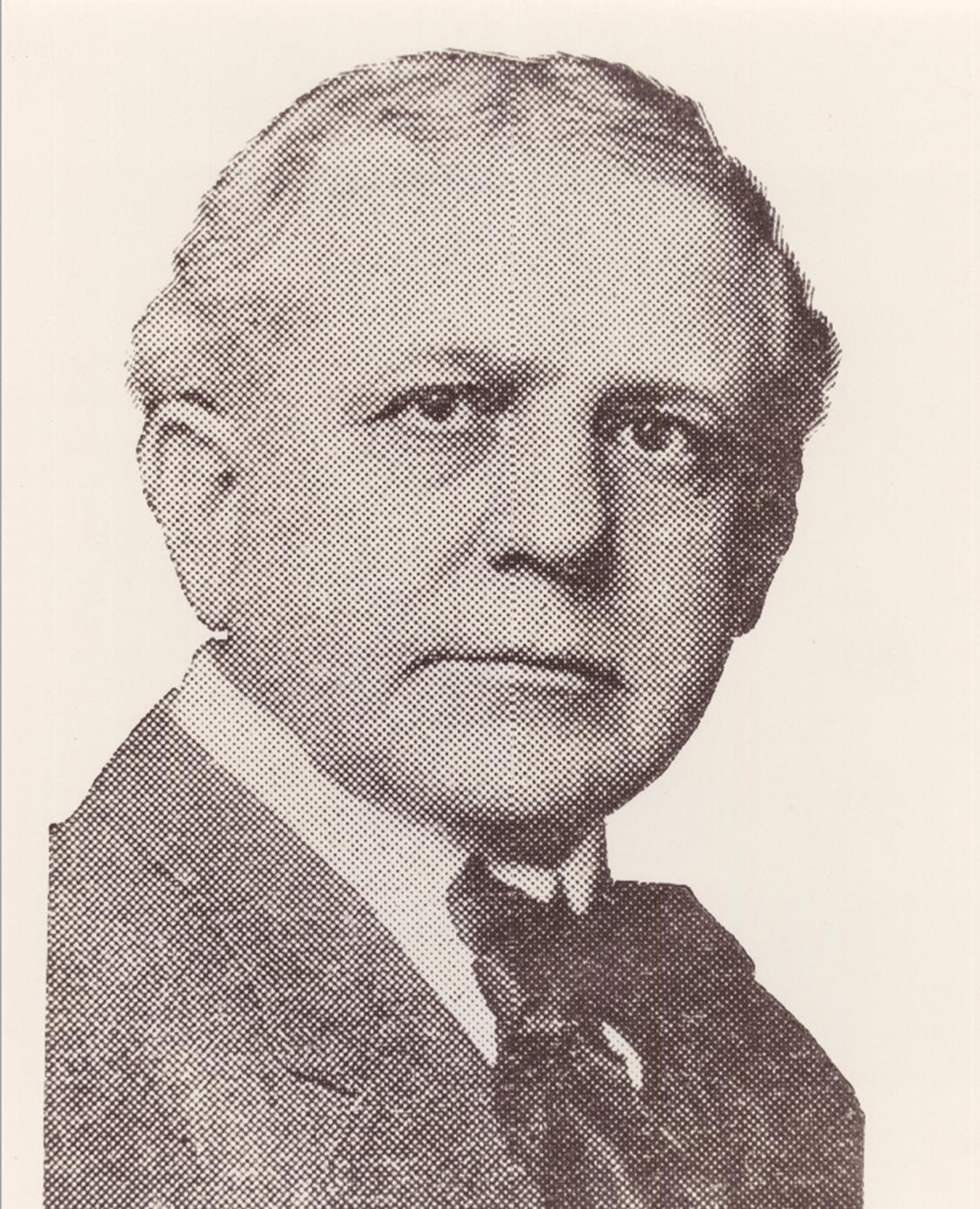

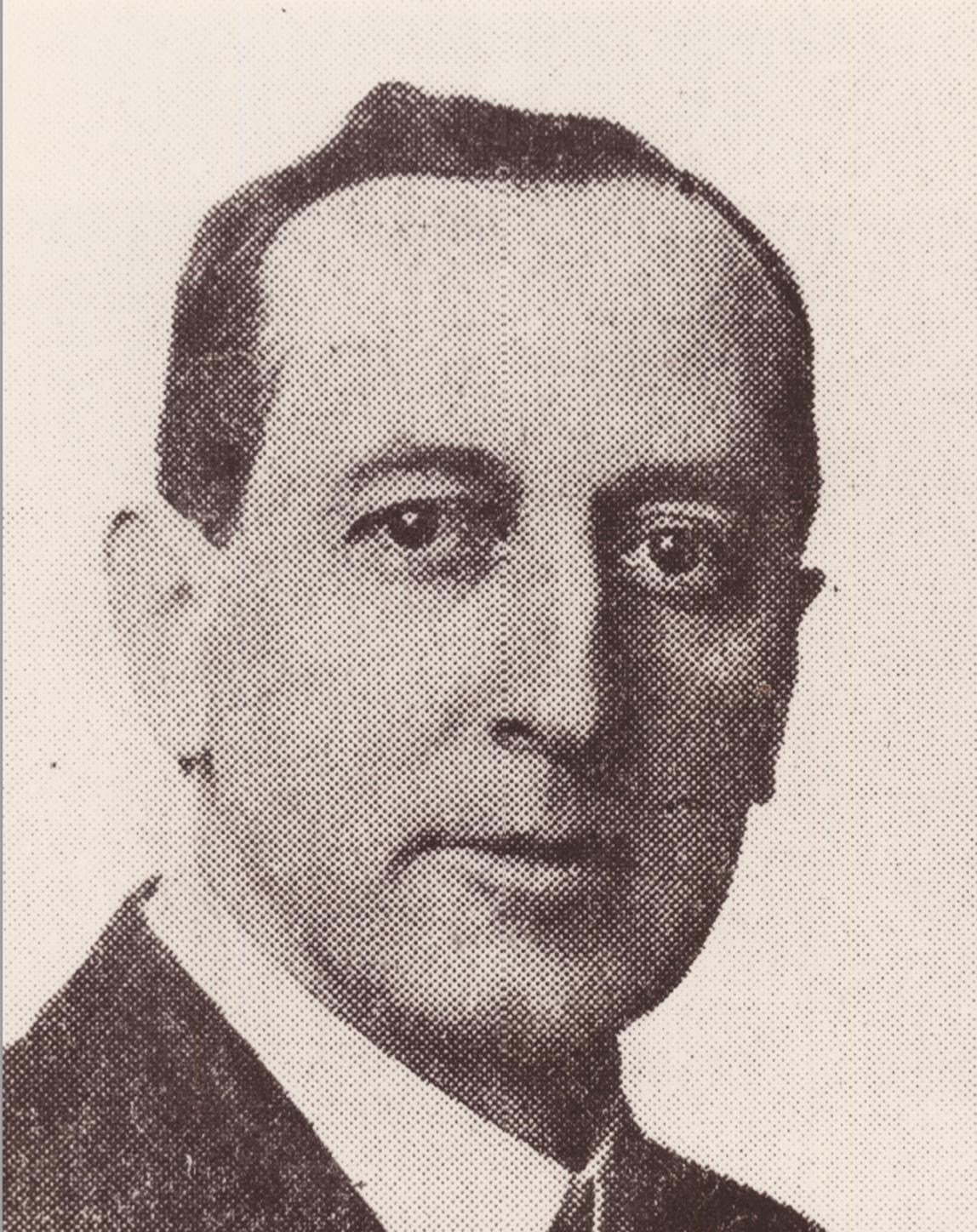
Nominee	James E. Wadham	Grant Conard
Party	Democratic	Republican
Popular vote	3,112	2,617
Percentage	54.3%	45.7%
Mayor before election
Grant Conard
Republican
Elected mayor
James E. Wadham
Democratic

The 1911 San Diego mayoral election was held on April 4, 1911, to elect the mayor for San Diego. Incumbent Mayor Grant Conard and James E. Wadham received the most votes in the primary election and advanced to the runoff. Wadham was then elected mayor with a majority of the votes.

== Candidates ==
- James E. Wadham, attorney and 1903 mayoral candidate
- Grant Conard, mayor of San Diego
- G.W. Miner

== Campaign ==
Incumbent Mayor Grant Conard, a Republican, stood for reelection on a non-partisan ticket. Conard's reelection was challenged by James E. Wadham, a Democrat. Also contesting the race was G.W. Miner, a Socialist.

On March 21, 1911, Conard and Wadham received the two highest vote totals in the primary and advanced to the general election. Wadham was then elected mayor on April 4, 1911, with a majority of the votes in the runoff.

== Primary Election results ==
San Diego mayoral primary election, 1911
Party	Candidate	Votes	%
Democratic	James E. Wadham	2,426	51.0
Republican	Grant Conard (incumbent)	1,472	30.9
Socialist	G.W. Miner	862	18.1
Total votes		4,760	100

== General Election results ==
San Diego mayoral general election, 1911
Party	Candidate	Votes	%
Democratic	James E. Wadham	3,112	54.3
Republican	Grant Conard (incumbent)	2,617	45.7
Total votes		5,729	100
