= 1907 San Diego mayoral election =

- April 2, 1907
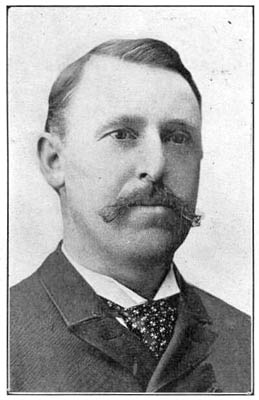

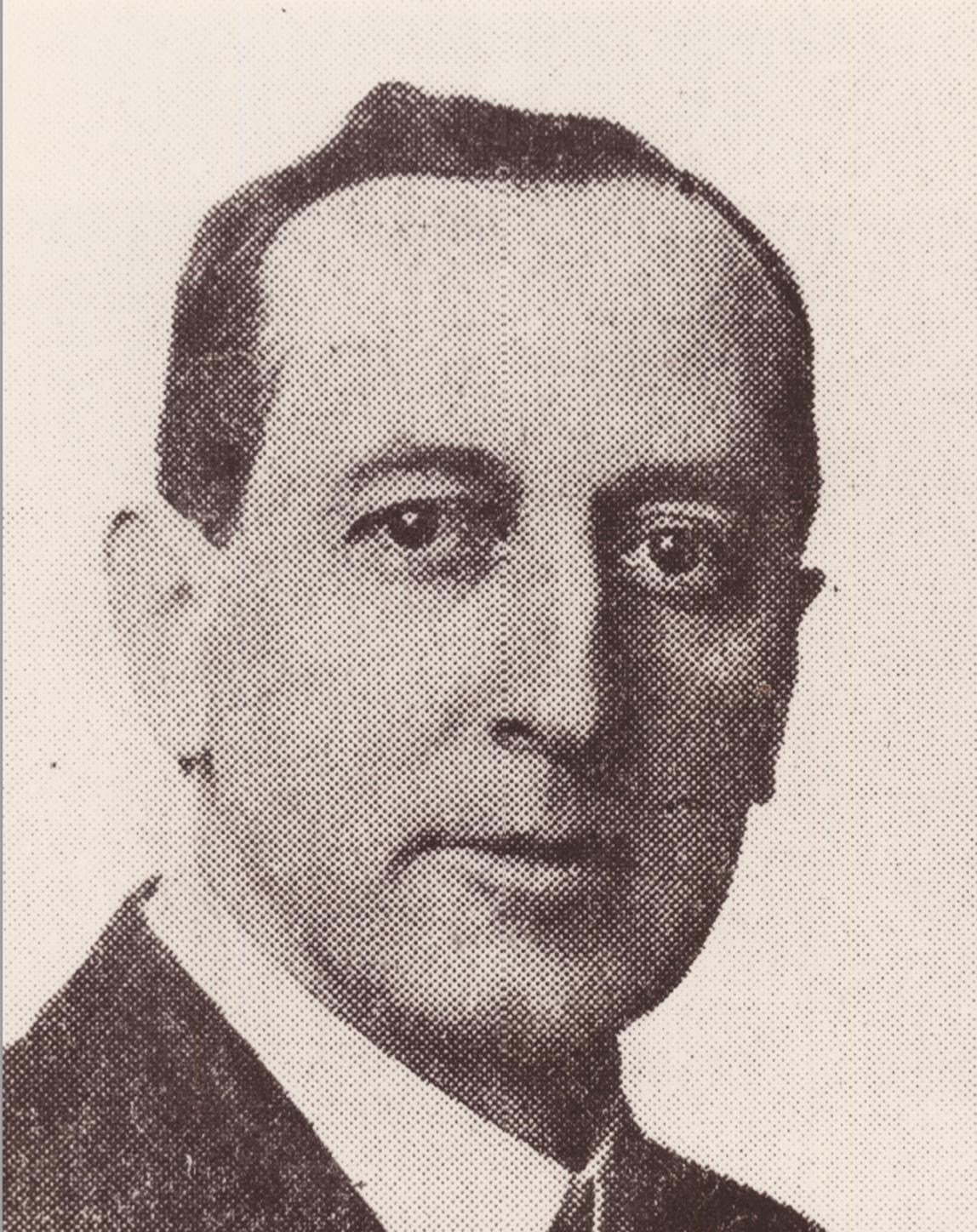
Nominee	John F. Forward Sr.	Grant Conard
Party	Republican	Republican
Popular vote	1,693	1,378
Percentage	39.3%	32.0%
Mayor before election
John L. Sehon
Democratic
Elected mayor
John F. Forward Sr.
Republican

The 1907 San Diego mayoral election was held on April 2, 1907, to elect the mayor for San Diego. John F. Forward Sr. was elected mayor with a plurality of the votes.

== Candidates ==
- John F. Forward Sr., businessman
- Grant Conard
- Ricard V. Dodge
- George A. Garrett

== Campaign ==
Incumbent Mayor John L. Sehon declined to run for reelection and instead endorsed Republican Grant Conard on the Non-Partisan ticket. Also contesting the race were John F. Forward Sr. on the official Republican ticket, Richard V. Dodge, a Democrat, and George A. Garrett, a Socialist.

On April 2, 1907, Forward was elected mayor with a plurality of 39.3 percent of the vote compared to 32.0 percent for Conard. Dodge came in third with 23.9 percent, and Garrett finished last with 4.7 percent.

== Election results ==
San Diego mayoral election, 1907
Party	Candidate	Votes	%
Republican	John F. Forward Sr.	1,693	39.3
Republican	Grant Conard	1,378	35.9
Democratic	Richard V. Dodge	1,030	23.9
Socialist	George Garrett	202	4.7
Total votes		4,303	100
