= O'Neall =

O'Neall is a surname. Notable people with the surname include:

- Charles F. O'Neall (1875–1929), American real estate agent and Democrat politician
- John Belton O'Neall (1793–1863), American judge
- John H. O'Neall (1838–1907), American lawyer and politician

== See also ==
- Neall
- O'Neill
