= Eucalyptus County Park =

Park in California, United States

Coordinates: 32°45′35″N 117°00′03″W

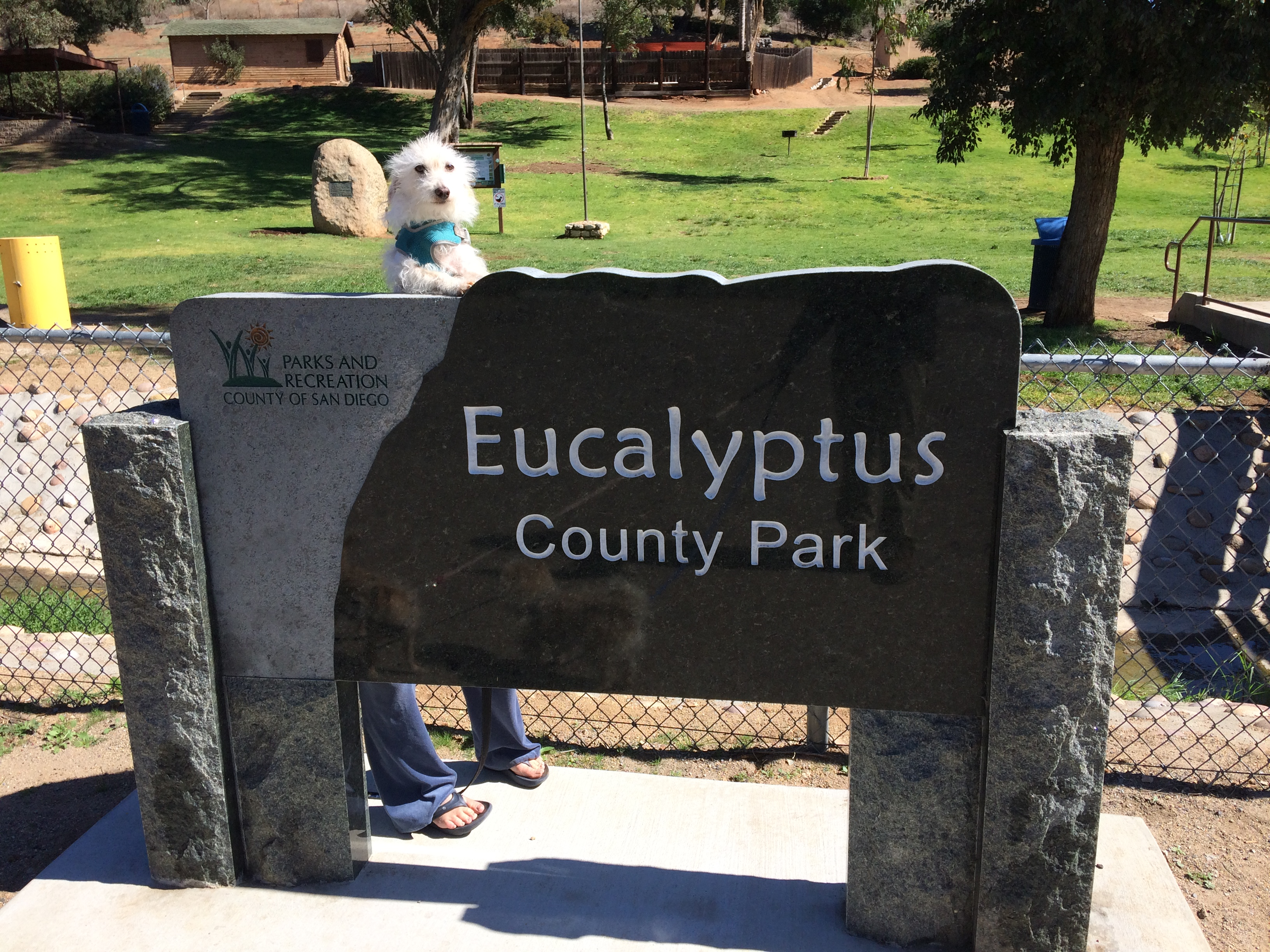

Eucalyptus County Park is a 6.45-acre (2.61 ha) urban park located at 9125 Edgewood Drive in Spring Valley, California, United States.

Named for the many eucalyptus trees on the property, the park frequently hosts birthday parties, horseshoes tournaments, BBQ grills, neighborhood children, dogs on leash, birdwatchers, a pair of hawks, and, often, artists painting the park itself. Eucalyptus County Park is managed and maintained by the Parks and Recreation Department of the County of San Diego. The park's site is one of the oldest in the eastern San Diego County dedicated to public recreational use.

== Amenities ==
In addition to 6 1/2 acres of open space areas, natural vegetation zones, green belts, gardens, and walking paths, it contains restrooms, two children's playgrounds, and the upper-level cement party area (aka Volunteer Area) under pepper trees and black oaks. Additionally, a small runoff/streambed runs southward, along the western portion of the park, en route to the Sweetwater River Spring Valley watershed. Because this park is on the side of a hill, there is limited ADA access.

== Recreational facilities ==
- 2 playgrounds
- 4 horseshoes pits
- 16 picnic tables scattered throughout the park (5 in the pavilion)
- pavilion
- restrooms
- 8 grills
- 2 parking lots, limited to under 40 spaces (no local on-street parking)
- wood bridge
- cement-and-rock bridge
- shallow streambed

== History ==
The eucalyptus trees were planted in 1880 by Charles S. Crosby, an early settler to the area. Bringing seeds from Australia with the intention of planting them as a source of railroad ties, Crosby transplanted a portion of the seedlings he had grown to a picnic area known as the Grove, which ultimately became the heart of the present-day park. Whenever a eucalyptus planted by Crosby in the park dies, it is replaced with a new eucalyptus sapling by the Parks and Recreation Department. Eight such saplings are growing in the park.

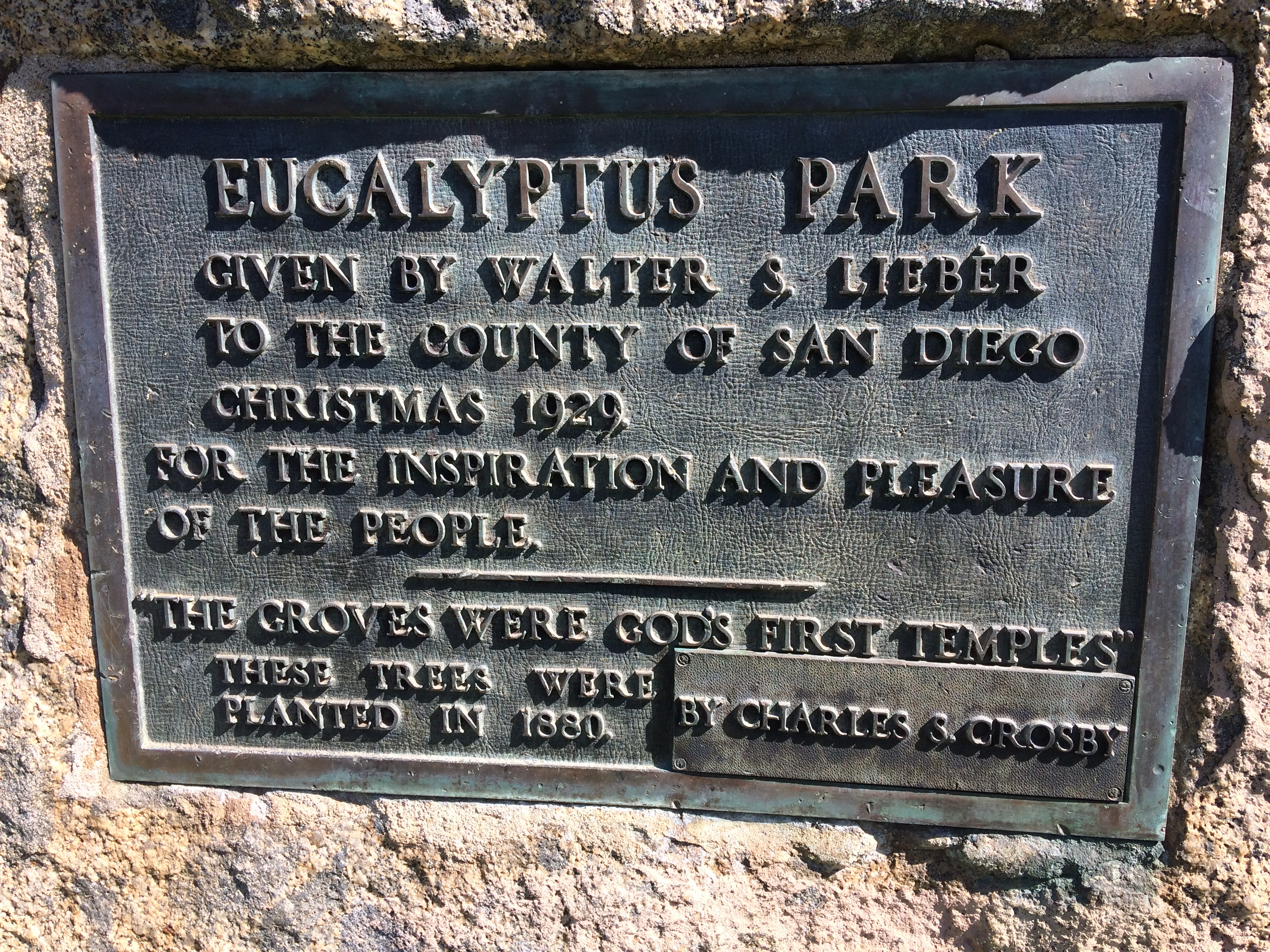
"The groves were God's first temples"

The property, afterwards owned by the local businessman Walter S. Lieber, was donated by him "to the County of San Diego ... for the inspiration and pleasure of the people" in 1929 (according to the monument in the center of the park). It is possible that Lieber's donation of this property for the use of the community was due to his admiration of Ellen Browning Scripps's many donations of parklands throughout San Diego County.

The park, placed in reserve in 1929, was dedicated on July 4, 1930, with a community parade, a party with games, picnics, a circus, fireworks and remarks by George Marston, who "expressed trees' importance to society".

Subsequently, the home on the upper lot was removed from the property due to safety issues, but the two original rock staircases and the set of hewn log stairs continues to be maintained.

== Gallery ==
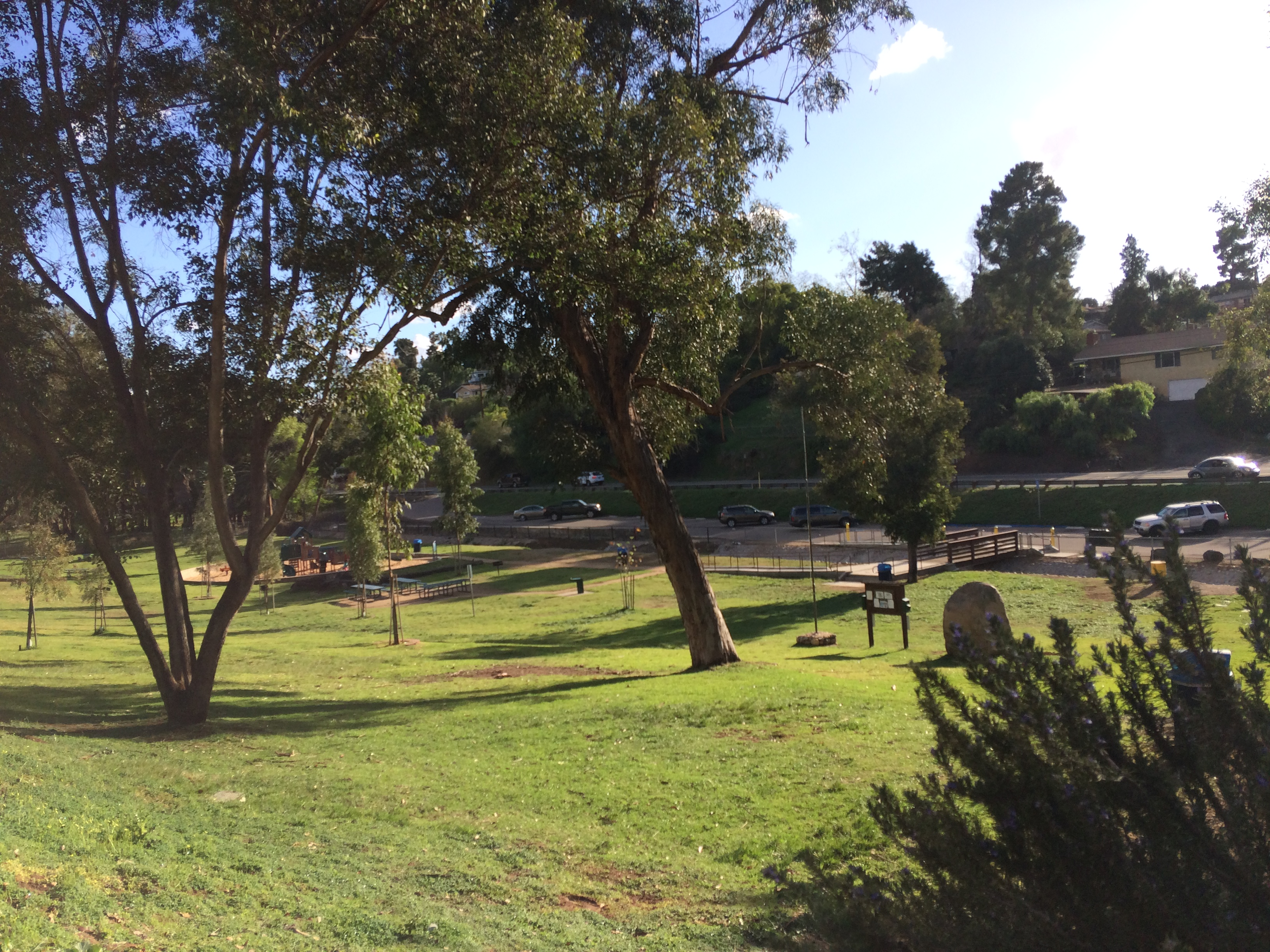
View from the pavilion, looking southwest

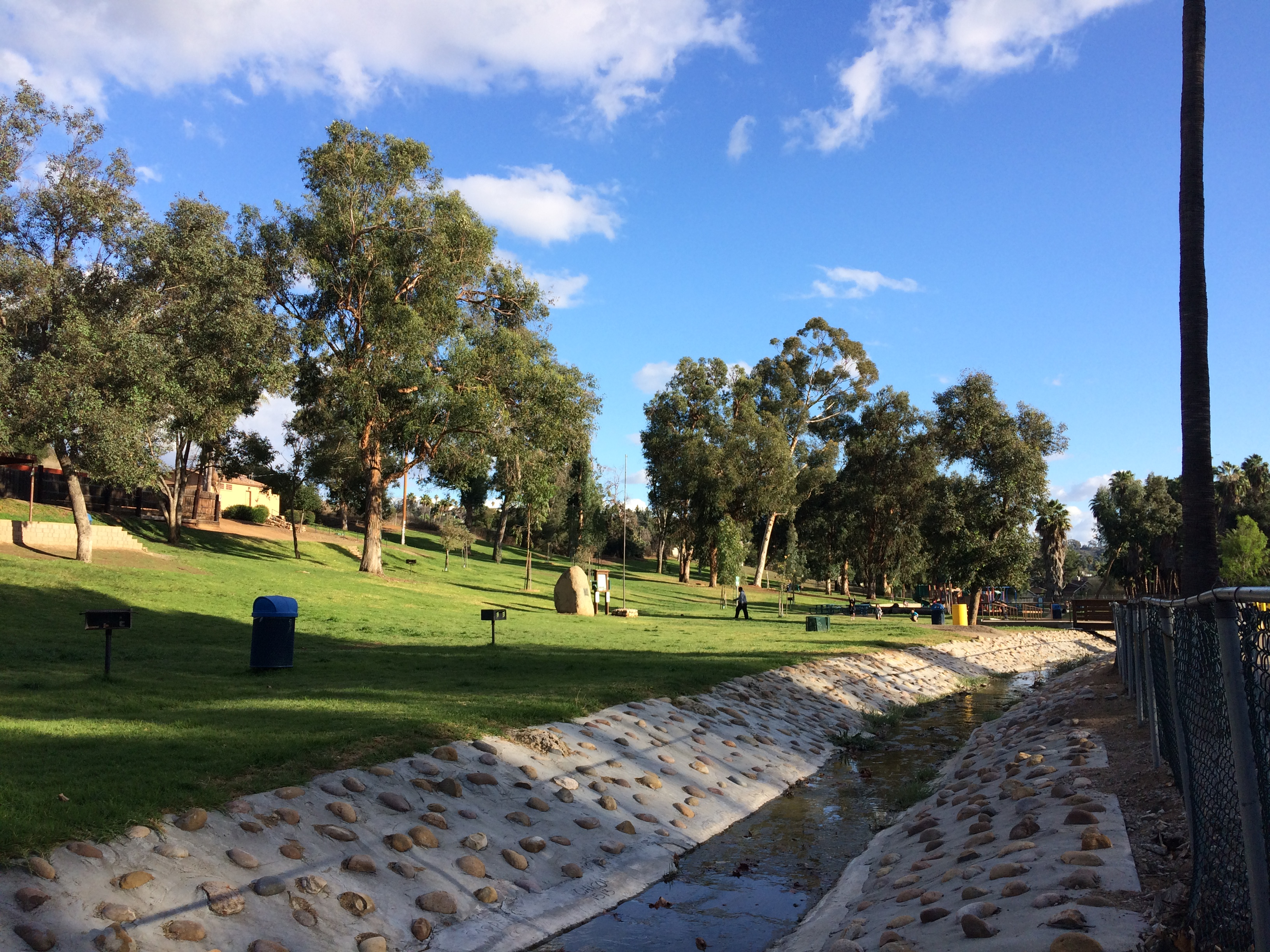
View south (downstream) from wood bridge at entrance

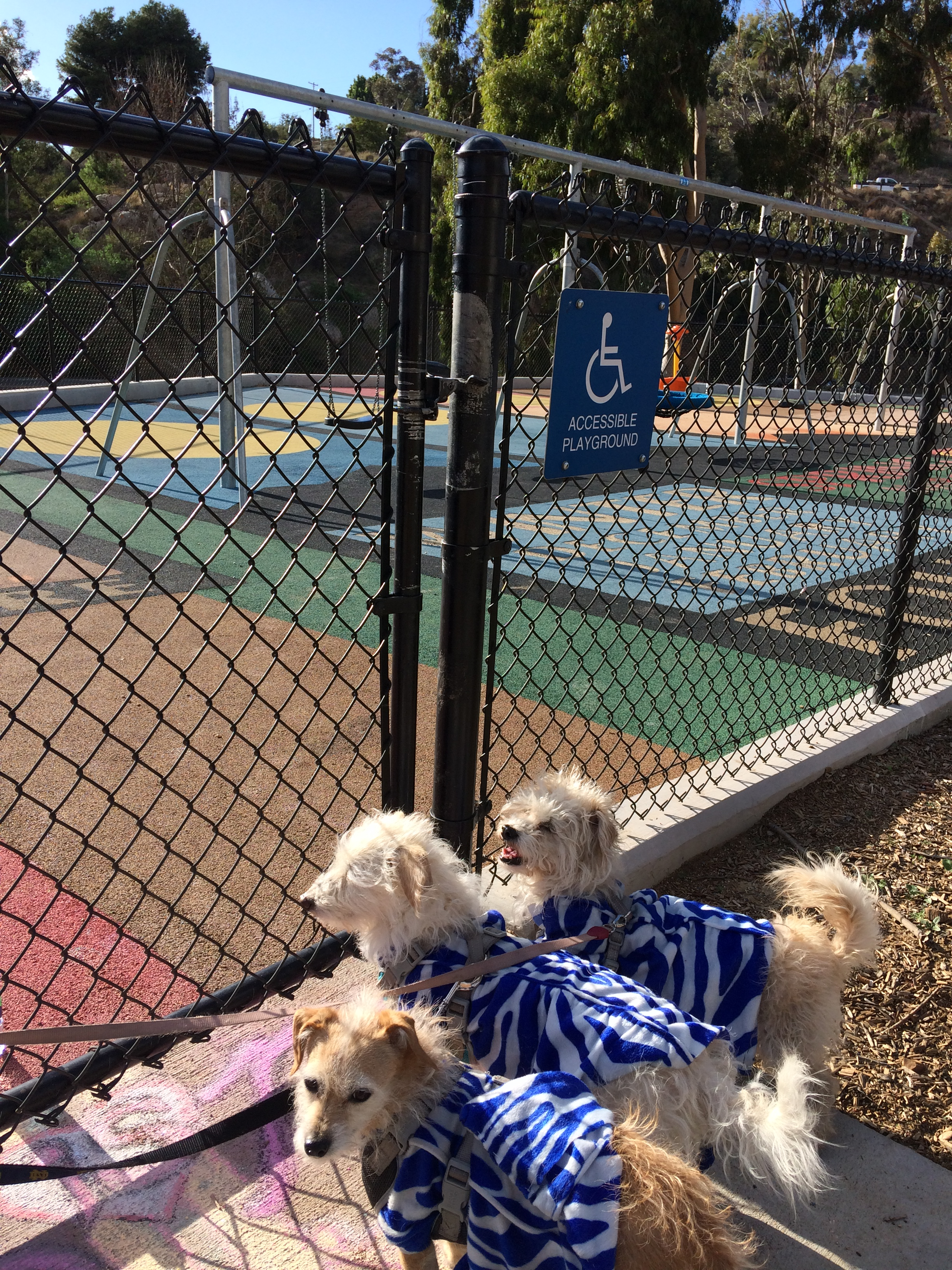
Small children's fenced playground

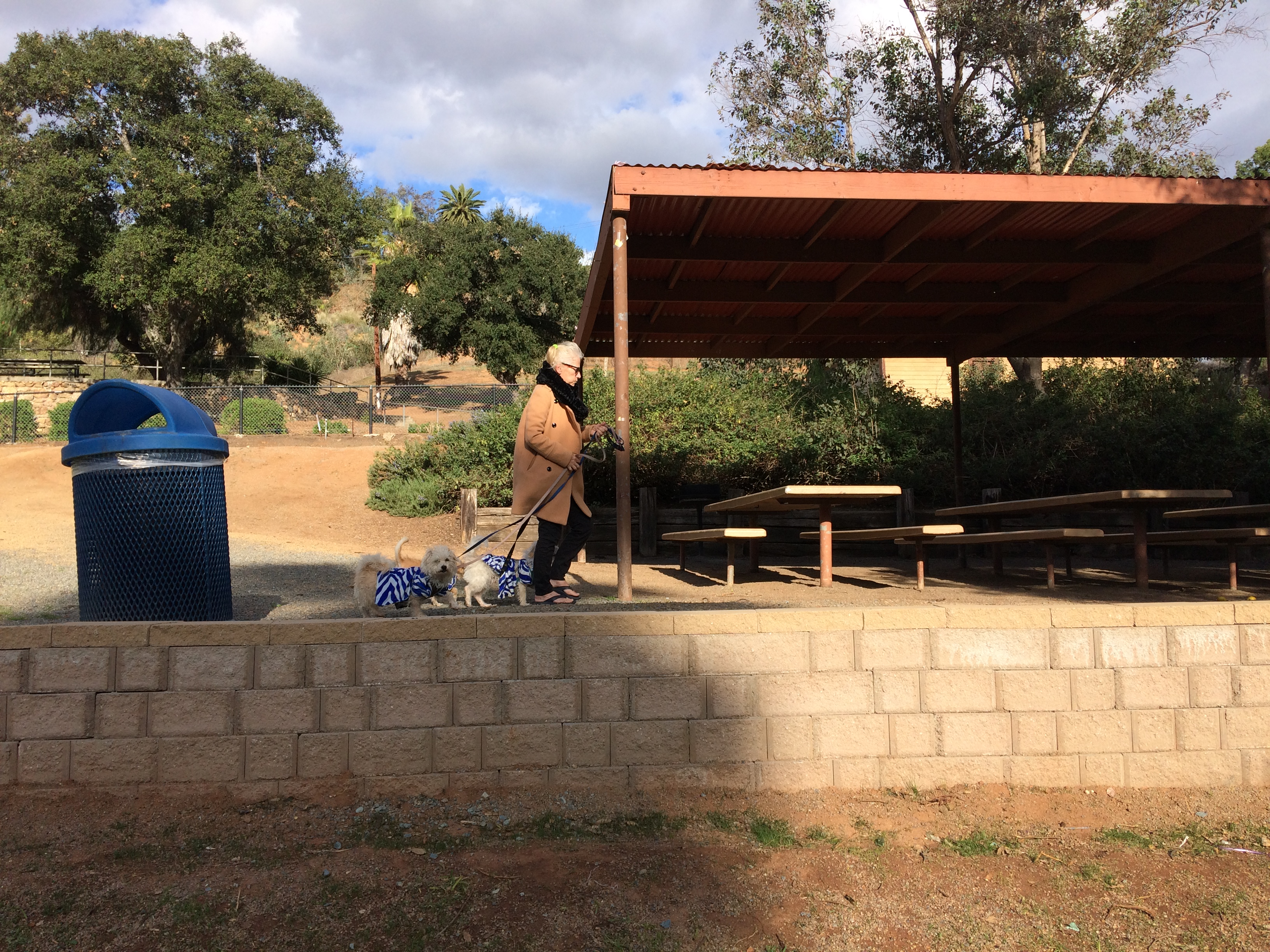
Picnic tables under the pavilion

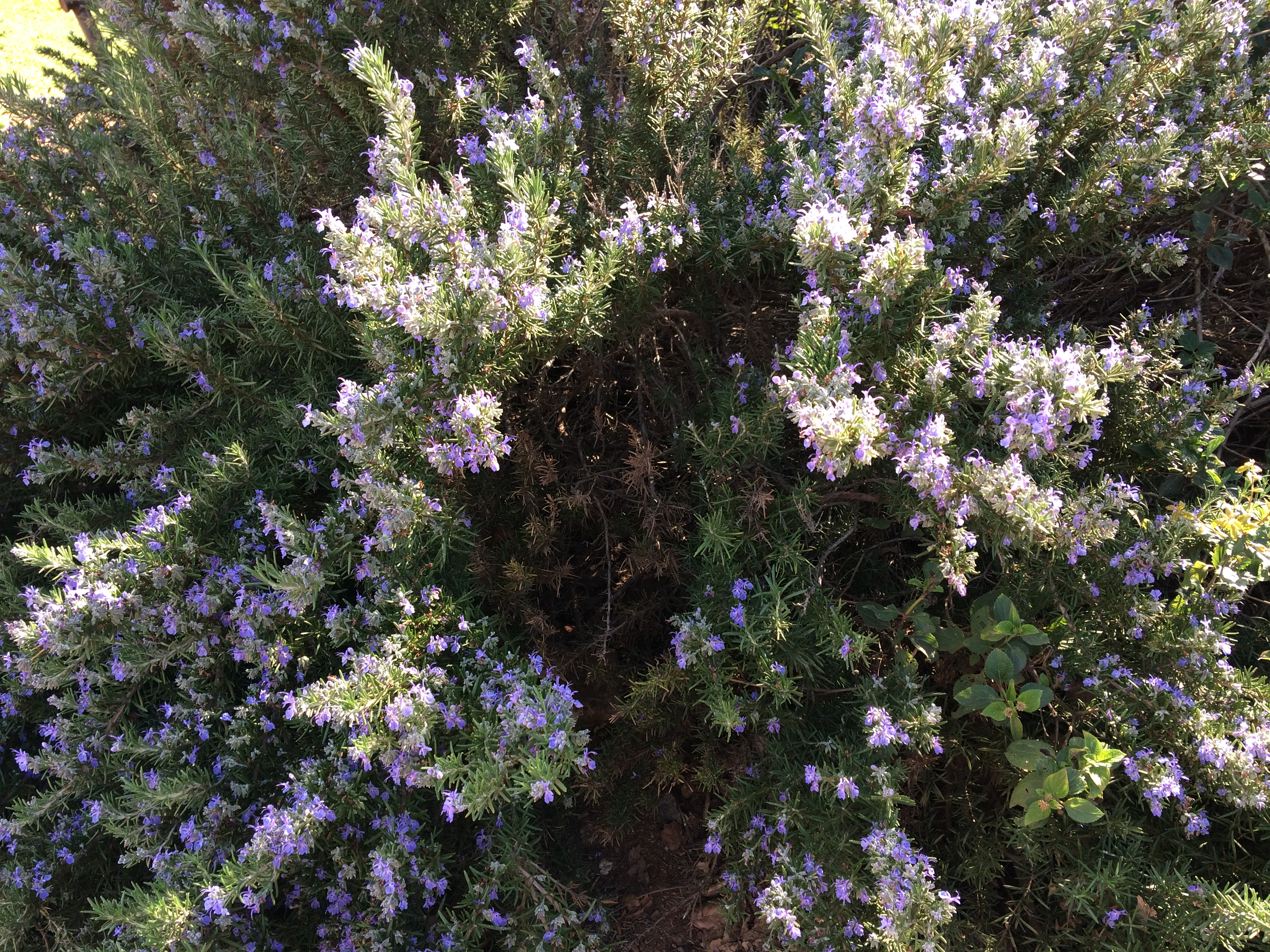
Thyme bushes with tiny blue flowers above the pavilion
