= San Diego free speech fight =

1912 period of class conflict over unionization

- Part of Free speech fights
- Location: San Diego
- Methods: Direct action, soapboxing, free speech fights, vigilantism, tar and feather, running a gauntlet, vehicular homicide, assault by fire hose

Parties
Socialists; International Workers of the World (IWW/Wobblies); Single taxers; California Free Speech League; San Diego Herald	San Diego City Council; San Diego Police Department; San Diego Union (newspaper); Merchants and Manufacturers Association; San Diego County Board of Supervisors

Lead figures
Emma Goldman; Ben Reitman	Harrison Gray Otis; John D. Spreckels; James E. Wadham; John L. Sehon; R.J. Walsh

The San Diego free speech fight in San Diego, California, in 1912 was one of the most famous class conflicts over the free speech rights of labor unions. Starting out as one of several direct actions known as free speech fights carried out across North America by the Industrial Workers of the World, the catalyst of the San Diego free speech fight was the passing of Ordinance No. 4623 that banned all kinds of speech in an area that included "soapbox row" downtown. Clashes with the police in the area led to riots, multiple deaths including the deaths of police officers, vigilantism, and the retaliatory kidnapping and torture of notable socialists, including Emma Goldman's manager Ben Reitman. As a direct result of the aftermath of this fight, the neighborhood of Stingaree was razed to the ground and San Diego's Chinatown was obliterated.

== Background ==
By the beginning of the 20th century, growing confrontations between the working class and their employers caused suspicion and animosity both within, and against the workers. Striking workers had taken militant action which culminated in the Haymarket riot in Chicago; the Great Southwest Railroad Strike of 1886 was crushed, destroying the Knights of Labor, coincident with the birth of the conservative American Federation of Labor. In the Western United States, the Western Federation of Miners (WFM) inherited the mantle of militant unionism, challenging capital in strikes from Cripple Creek to Canada. Many communities sought to limit the spread of union philosophy by revoking rights granted by the United States Constitution, particularly the freedom of speech granted by the First Amendment.

=== Industrial Workers of the World ===
In 1905, the WFM and other unions, together with socialist, and anarchist groups met in Chicago to form the Industrial Workers of the World (IWW) in what came to be called the "First Continental Congress of the working class." The immediate purpose of the IWW was to unite all working people into one worldwide union, regardless of race, creed, sex, skill, or national origin. The ultimate goal was abolition of the wage system, replacing wage labour with worker cooperatives.

The Wobblies, as IWW members were called, frequently engaged in creative tactics, including soapboxing and free speech fights . The IWW orators spoke to workers about bosses, corruption, exploitation, and the unfairness of capitalism. Championing such a direct challenge to capital, members of the IWW faced persecution and prejudice in North America and throughout the world. In many American cities, IWW members found their right to public speech interfered with by local ordinances, police harassment and vigilante violence.

In 1910, the IWW attempted to organize Mexican workers of the San Diego Consolidated Gas and Electric Company. A successful strike led to the formation of a public service union, which was disbanded when many of the Mexican workers left to participate in the Mexican Revolution.

== Germania Hall incident ==
On November 10, 1910, Local 13 of the IWW held a meeting to celebrate the martyrs of the Chicago Haymarket riot. The police closed down the Wobbly meeting place, Germania Hall, before the event could take place. In response, the IWW took their grievances to the streets and began their soapbox free speech campaign. Afterwards, Wobblies who spoke "on the soapbox" were jailed, "fingerprinted, photographed in jail and then released."

In response to the Germania Hall incident, the IWW shifted their efforts to a form of soapbox oratory in order to win over a diverse spectrum of the working class, focusing on gaining converts through their speeches. The fifty members of the IWW refocused their efforts to Heller's Corner at the corner of 5th and E Streets, in the center of the Stingaree. The Stingaree contained a mélange of ethnic groups: ranging from whites, white immigrant, blacks, Mexicans, and Chinese, most of which were members of the working class. The Stingaree and Heller's Corner were symbolic hubs for the San Diegan prejudices against different races and lower classes. The Stingaree was home to everything different and unknown that went against the "mission" ideal in San Diego, including: saloons, shops, cheap hotels, gambling houses, opium dens and prostitutes. The square block at the corner of Fifth and E Streets was home to more than just debauchery, as it also was the central location for a variety of "soapbox orators" including the Salvation Army, Socialists, Holy Rollers, and the Single Taxers. The situation was relatively peaceful and there were no violent run-ins with the police, until after the Germania Hall incident.

== Jail conditions and civil disobedience ==
The increase in arrests led to the rapid filling of the San Diego jails, causing overcrowding and the rapid decline of prison conditions, increasing Wobbly anger toward law enforcement. The reports about jail conditions were conflicting, but the general trend seems to show that the Wobblies and other pro-free speech detainees were treated badly. The jails filled up so quickly that the police used their sobering rooms or drunk tanks for housing inmates. These tanks had no beds and the arrested were forced to sleep on vermin infested concrete floors. Moreover, police brutality and aggression were rampant, while beatings and other abuses were relatively common throughout the ordeal. Sixty-three-year-old Michael Hoy died on March 28 after the police beat him and withheld medical attention.

These events coincided with the plan of the Free Speech League to "glut the jails and then to demand individual jury trials which would clog the courts and bring the legal machinery to a standstill." This especially appealed to the IWW, so much so that they called for 20,000 Wobblies to converge on San Diego in order to bring the system to a halt. There were 50 members of local 13 in 1912, but roughly 5,000 Wobblies came to San Diego to participate in the free speech fight. District Attorney Utley tried to offer a compromise to the Wobblies, promising to free the men originally arrested for conspiracy if the IWW ceased its public speaking in the restricted zone. The IWW declined the offer on principle even through its attorney, E.E. Kirk, recommended that they accept the compromise. The arrests continued. The IWW then protested against the detainment and the prison conditions in front of the city jail. Five thousand protesters turned out, and the police indiscriminately blasted people, including women and children, with fire hoses.

== Ordinance prohibiting free speech ==
In October 1912, publisher Harrison Gray Otis, owner of the Los Angeles Times and a leader in the anti-union Merchants and Manufacturers Association, was invited to speak at the U.S. Grant Hotel where he was the first to suggest an ordinance forbidding street meetings. On December 8, a petition signed by eighty-five prominent citizens and property owners who had hoped to prohibit "street speaking" in a seven-square block zone centered around 5th and E was presented to the San Diego Common Council. This was followed by a recommendation from a Grand Jury to ban street speaking in the city entirely.

The Wobblies, Single Taxers, and Socialists had signed a 250-person counter-petition.

There was a period of uncertainty, during which the council delayed its decision. The council may have simply been searching for affirmation from the general public in order to avoid widespread conflict and dismay throughout the city. Some council members "believed that a referendum would show that the majority of San Diegans favored speaking anywhere at anytime."

On January 6, 1912, the Socialists and Single Taxers were holding a soapbox event on the streets when an off-duty constable and real estate man, R. J. Walsh drove his car into a crowd at the closed-off Soapbox Row. With his horn blaring, he attempted to disrupt the orators. His car was mobbed and its tires were slashed. Walsh reported the incident to the police who broke up the meeting.

On January 8, 1912, the San Diego Common Council passed Ordinance No. 4623, which called for a restricted zone of 49-square blocks in the middle of San Diego, encompassing all of "Soapbox Row" because the meetings blocked traffic and that necessitated an ordinance for "the immediate preservation of the public peace, health, and safety and one of emergency." The initial punishment for violating the ordinance was a $25 to $100 fine and/or thirty days' imprisonment. An emergency clause called for the immediate cessation of public free speech rights, sidestepping the customary twenty-day implementation wait period.

The Wobblies' attorney questioend that the violence on January 6 was the council's pretext for issuing the ordinance, but city councilmember John L. Sehon claimed that the language had been written well before the incident and they had "always in favor of" the ordinance.

== Vigilantes ==
On February 8, 1912, the day the ordinance took effect, 5000 citizens marched in support of the California Free Speech League. Forty-one protesters were arrested. By February 10, forty-four more were arrested and charged with violating a more restricted ordinance that included zones outside the 49 block restricted zone. Also on February 10, a small article in the San Diego Union called for the formation of a "horsewhip vigilante committee" to deal with the "invasion" of Wobblies.

The increase in arrests left Police Chief Keno Wilson with a dilemma; he wanted to punish the protesters, but simultaneously faced overcrowded jails and stockades. After local newspapers began editorializing vociferously against the protesters and their tactics, groups of vigilantes began transporting arrested Wobblies and free speakers to the county line. The vigilantes began patrolling trains that were inbound from the north, and would grab Wobblies and invited speakers before they could get to the city. The vigilantes then proceeded to "reeducate" the speakers on patriotism as this brutal first hand account notes:

They were drunk and hollering and cursing the rest of the night. In the morning they took us out four or five at a time and marched us up the track to the county line ... where were forced to kiss the flag and then run a gauntlet of 106 men, every one of which was striking at us as hard as they could with their pick ax handles. They broke one man's leg, and everyone was beaten black and blue, and was bleeding from a dozen wounds.

These incidents occurred quite frequently, but there was no significant outcry from the middle class citizens of San Diego.

The San Diego Board of Supervisors authorized mounted police to patrol the Orange County border to prevent Wobblies from entering the fray. On March 4, the San Diego Police deputized 500 men to fight the wobblies. An editorial in the Evening Tribune claimed "hanging is none too good" for the Wobblies. "They are the waste material of creation and should be drained off into the sewer of oblivion there to rot in cold obstruction like any other excrement.”

On March 10, a protest formed outside of the jail, Chief Wilson ordered firefighters to turn a hose on the crowd. They also arrested people attempting to sell newspapers including the San Francisco Bulletin, San Diego Herald and the Labor Leader.

On March 18, the Union reported that 1000 vigilantes organized by local businessmen were cooperating with the police.

On April 5, sixty-five year old editor of the Herald Abraham R. Sauer — who published articles supportive of the free speech fight and critical of the police — was kidnapped, hung by the neck and allowed to live in exchange for a promise of silence.

The state of California finally intervened, as Governor Hiram Johnson was flooded with demands for an inquiry into the arrests and vigilantism in San Diego. Governor Johnson sent Harris Weinstock to act as an investigative commissioner. Weinstock claimed the vigilantes included members of the county district attorneys office, the city prosecutors office, and the fire department and that publisher John D. Spreckels was "the greatest vigilante of them all." Ultimately, however, Weinstock changed course and concluded that there was no mistreatment of prisoners and that the police were “above average in intelligence, character, and personality.“

Weinstock likened the situation to Tsarist Russia and suggested the attorney general of California file criminal charges against “the citizens’ committee, the press who condoned the lawlessness, the Merchants Association, the Chamber of Commerce, and other commercial bodies,” but he did not. He did not find any violence committed by the IWW, but insisted on "the most extreme punishment within the law" against them.

Weinstock interviewed anyone police and anyone who volunteered in the crisis in April 1912, but he was criticized by the Free Speech League for not interviewing anyone involved on the labor side of the protest. The report was not released until May 20, 1912, and it did not include the police killing of Joseph Mikolash, a Wobbly, inside the San Diego headquarters of IWWon May 7 or the Reitman affair.

== Emma Goldman and Ben Reitman ==
Emma Goldman's journal 'Mother Earth'. San Diego Edition, June 1912.

Emma Goldman and Ben Reitman came to San Diego for Goldman to give her speech "An Enemy of the People" on May 15, 1912. When the two arrived at the train station the same women that allegedly needed protection from the soapbox orators yelled "Give us that anarchist; we will strip her naked; we will tear out her guts." Mayor of San Diego James E. Wadham offered a warning, but no help to the two activists. Reitman was abducted by vigilantes from his hotel room and tortured. He later recalled,

They tore my clothes off. They knocked me down, and when I lay naked on the ground, they kicked and beat me until I was almost insensible. With a lighted cigar they burned the letters I.W.W. on my buttocks; then they poured a can of tar over my head and, in the absence of feathers, rubbed sage-brush on my body. One of them attempted to push a cane into my rectum. Another twisted my testicles. They forced me to kiss the flag and sing The Star-Spangled Banner. When they tired of the fun, they gave me my underwear for fear we should meet any women. They also gave me back my vest, in order that I might carry my money, railroad ticket, and watch. The rest of my clothes they kept. I was ordered to make a speech, and then they commanded me to run the gauntlet. The Vigilantes lined up, and as I ran past them, each one gave me a blow or a kick. Then they let me go.

The police forcibly sent Goldman to Los Angeles before she could give her speech. After being beaten and left in his undergarments, Reitman boarded a train to rejoin her in Los Angeles.

By the fall of 1912, the Soapbox Row had been abandoned. In fact, the whole neighborhood of Stingaree was razed. Goldman and Reitman attempted to return in 1913 but were arrested and "deported" by police. Goldman did not succeed in giving another speech in the city until June 1915.

== Legacy ==
The ban was rescinded in 1915, but in 1918 a similar ordinance banning "seditious language" was not repealed until September 2020 after objections following the Black Lives Matter protests.

=== In song ===
From the July 11, 1912, edition of the IWW's Little Red Songbook, the first stanza of "We're Bound For San Diego":

In that town called San Diego when the workers try to talk,
The cops will smash them with a sap and tell them "take a walk",
They throw them in a bull pen and they feed them rotten beans,
And they call that "law and order" in that city, so it seems.

The bonus track "Tar and Sagebrush" on the Anti-Flag album The Bright Lights of America is a folk punk interpretation of Ben Reitman's description of his torture.

=== 100th anniversary ===
On January 6, 2012, protesters from Occupy San Diego invoked the 1912 free speech fight while arguing against an encroachment law in 2012 by using soapboxes as props while observing the 100th anniversary of the San Diego free speech fight.

On January 8, Ben Reitman's great-granddaughter took part in a commemoration event at 5th and E.

On February 7, the San Diego City Council issued a proclamation to "express its deep dismay for our predecessor's actions and formally reiterates the Council’s repudiation of this shameful ordinance." The proclamation was presented to representatives of the ACLU and local labor officials but members of Occupy San Diego who were present reminded the public of a similar municipal code that was currently being used to arrest peaceful protesters.

Through February 12, an exhibit featuring art and historical exploration of California labor history hosted by Under the Perfect Sun co-author Jim Miller and labor leader Lorena Gonzalez was displayed at Centro Cultural de la Raza in Balboa Park.

On April 12, 2012, the San Diego Imperial Counties Labor Council applied to the City of San Diego Historical Resources Board to designate the "San Diego Free Speech Site at Heller’s Corner" a commemorative historic site that "does not include any specific built environment features such as buildings or paving, as the existing features do not date to the period of significance." The item passed by unanimous consent on April 26.

== See also ==
- Green Corn Rebellion
- Seattle's Potlatch Riot of 1913
