= 1905 San Diego mayoral election =

- April 4, 1905
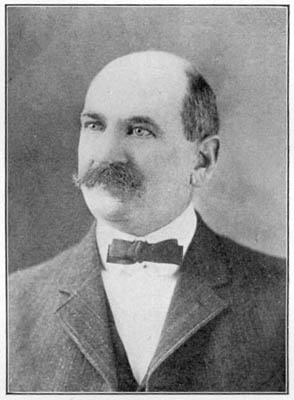

Nominee	John L. Sehon	Dan F. Jones
Party	Democratic	Republican
Popular vote	2,018	1,376
Percentage	52.7%	35.9%
Mayor before election
Frank P. Frary
Republican
Elected mayor
John L. Sehon
Democratic

The 1905 San Diego mayoral election was held on April 4, 1905, to elect the mayor of San Diego. John L. Sehon was elected mayor with a majority of the votes.

== Candidates ==
- John L. Sehon, retired army captain and member of the San Diego City Council
- Dan F. Jones, president of the San Diego City Council
- W.J. Kirkwood

== Campaign ==
Incumbent Mayor Frank P. Frary declined to run for reelection. Three candidates campaigned for the open seat: Dan Jones, a Republican, John L. Sehon, a Democrat running on the Non-Partisan ticket, and W.J. Kirkwood, a Socialist.

On April 4, 1905, Sehon was elected mayor with a majority of 52.7 percent of the vote. Jones came in second with 35.9 percent of the vote. Kirkwood came in third with 11.3 percent.

During the campaign, it was questioned whether a retired army officer such as Sehon was eligible for civil office. Fearing that his opponents would attempt to lock him out of office, Sehon broke into City Hall in the middle of the night of the first day of his term to forcibly take possession of the office of the mayor.

== Election results ==
San Diego mayoral election, 1905
Party	Candidate	Votes	%
Democratic	John L. Sehon	2,018	52.7
Republican	Dan F. Jones	1,376	35.9
Socialist	W.J. Kirkwood	438	11.3
Total votes		3,832	100
