= Neall =

Neall is a surname. Notable people with the surname include:

- Charles F. O'Neall (1875–1929), American real estate agent and politician
- Gail Neall (born 1955), Australian swimmer
- John H. O'Neall (1838–1907), U.S. Representative from Indiana
- Robert R. Neall (born 1948), American politician

== See also ==
- Neall Ellis, Rhodesian/South African pilot
- Neall Massif, mountain massif rising between the Salamander and West Quartzite Ranges
