= Stingaree, San Diego =

Human settlement in San Diego, California, United States of America

Coordinates: 32°42′36″N 117°9′44″W

The Stingaree was a neighborhood in downtown San Diego from the boom of the 1880s until it was demolished during a vice eradication campaign of 1916. It was the site of the city's Chinatown. Because of this, along with its working-class origins, it earned a reputation as the home to the city's "undesirables", including prostitutes, pimps, drug dealers, and gamblers. Additionally, the neighborhood was home to many other working-class citizens, and was in the center of a wider blue-collar residential area encompassing much of the city south of Broadway.

Though the name "Stingaree" (a colloquial pronunciation of "stingray") refers primarily to the period before 1916, the neighborhood's character as a red-light district lasted until its massive redevelopment in the 1980s.

== Etymology and name origins ==
The name "Stingaree" is most famously associated with a colorful metaphor of the era: that a visitor to the district's dense concentration of saloons, gambling houses, and brothels was just as likely to get "stung" by vice as a swimmer wading in the shallow waters of San Diego Bay.

The first recorded appearance of the name in print occurred in the late 19th century. On November 24, 1881, the San Diego Union dryly reported that the dilapidated wooden structures along lower Fifth Avenue, known locally as "Stingaree Row," were finally "receiving a much-needed application of paint, soap, and water."

While the popular "vice" metaphor remains the dominant explanation, parallel local oral histories and environmental evidence point to a literal, physical origin for the name. During the localized, small-scale development of the New Town waterfront in the late 19th century, private developers and municipal builders worked to overcome the extensive tidal mudflats and shallow waters that separated downtown from navigable deep-water channels. The original mean high tide line ran very close to Front and J Streets, leaving wide stretches of warm mudflats exposed at low tide. These shallows served as prime nesting grounds for thousands of stingrays.

To build up usable, solid dry land for waterfront blocks and warehouses near the foot of G Street, developers constructed wharves and filled in the low-lying tide flats with dredged silt. While the soft tissue of any marine life scooped up in this fill dirt quickly decayed, the durable, venomous tail barbs of the stingrays remained embedded in the unpaved dirt roads for years. Local oral history passed down by early residents of Front Street notes that stepping on these discarded, dried stingray barbs—especially after heavy rains washed away the topsoil—was a frequent, painful physical hazard for neighborhood children and laborers, reinforcing the "Stingaree" moniker through literal, physical encounters.

== Boundaries ==
The exact boundaries of the neighborhood are contested and likely changed throughout the years. The Health Department identified them as First and Fifth Avenues to the west and east, and Market and K Streets to the north and south.

== Crime ==
Gambling and prostitution were illegal in California after 1855. However, law enforcement throughout America and especially in the West saw these vices as impossible to eradicate. Special "restricted" districts were created in many cities where the vices were tolerated so long as they were kept within the boundaries of the district and that there were no greater crimes involved. Illegal payments from the vice trade to the police were also typical components of these bargains. The Stingaree, like the more famous Barbary Coast in San Francisco, was one of these districts.

The neighborhood saw a concentration of drug peddlers, brothels and gambling halls. Many other establishments in the neighborhood participated in petty crime, like the Railroad Coffeehouse on Fifth and K that sold liquor after midnight under the title "Coffee Royal" (coffee and whisky) for 15¢. There were at least 120 openly illegal establishments in the district in 1888.

Between 1887 and around 1896 Wyatt Earp owned four saloons and gambling halls in San Diego, one on Fifth, one on Fourth Street, and two others near Sixth and E. The saloons offered 21 games including faro, blackjack, poker, keno, and other Victorian-American games of chance like pedro and monte. At the height of San Diego's real estate boom, Earp made up to $1,000 a night in profit.

The Oyster Bar on Fifth Avenue was one of the more popular saloons in the Stingaree district. One of the reasons it drew a good crowd was the brothel upstairs named the Golden Poppy. Each room was painted a different color and each prostitute wore a matching dress. In 2003, the Oyster Bar saloon was converted into a restaurant by former San Diego mayor Roger Hedgecock who opened Roger's On Fifth.

== Chinese population ==
The southwest corner of the Stingaree (between Market, K, First and Fourth) was the site of the city's Chinatown from the 1860s until the 1930s. During this period, the Chinese in California were marginalized by sometimes violent anti-Chinese movements, as well as the passage of laws that made it a crime to hire Chinese laborers while there were non-Chinese willing to take the work. This, together with a decline in Chinese fishing due to the fear of being blocked readmission into the country from the waters, led to the creation of a thoroughly impoverished and ghettoized population. Many Chinese fell prey to the neighborhood's opium dens and gambling houses.

== Social unrest ==
The Industrial Workers of the World found a ready audience with the Stingaree's marginalized working-class population. Their attempts to organize the residents were met with a 1912 ordinance banning street speaking. The city police were given special powers to break up demonstrations. When Emma Goldman came to speak in San Diego, she was driven out of town by vigilantes. Her manager Ben Reitman was kidnapped, the initials I.W.W. were branded into his buttocks and he was tarred and sagebrushed. What followed were years of demonstrations by the IWW, AFL, and other groups. These demonstrations were often violently suppressed by the police, turning the neighborhood into a scene of overt social conflict. .

== City action ==
Starting with the 1880s, there were many election-time promises to reform the Stingaree, most of which were not acted on. In 1912 the Health Department began to eradicate vice in the district. They acted against the recommendations of San Diego police chief Keno Wilson, who believed that this would spread prostitution into other parts of the city. The health department's action was in keeping with the national Progressive movement that called for closing these districts.

Between 1912 and 1916 over 120 structures were destroyed, transforming the image of the city and creating a large homeless population. Many prostitutes were driven out of town. A large portion of the Chinatown was razed in the process as well. Although the name of the district disappeared, extensive raids against prostitution took place as late as 1938, and significant massage parlor raids occurred in 1973. Vice and poverty dominated the area until its redevelopment in the 1980s.

== Present day ==
The wild character of the neighborhood was finally removed by modern-day redevelopment. Many of the neighborhood's residents—and modern red-light uses—were removed with eminent domain, tax increment financing and other strong-arm techniques. The redevelopment efforts hinged on turning the neighborhood into an 1880s-themed upscale shopping area. The new Gaslamp Quarter recreates a "gaslamp era" town that has few characteristics of its actual history as the Stingaree. The last vestiges of the neighborhood's red-light history have been overcome by historical recreationism.

== See also ==
- History of San Diego
- Downtown San Diego
