= Birdville, Texas =

Former community in Tarrant County, Texas

Coordinates: 32.8161°N 97.2716°W

Birdville was a former community in Tarrant County, Texas, United States, which was founded circa 1840. Today, the community is known and incorporated as Haltom City.

== History ==
A team of Texas Rangers led by Jonathan Bird were dispatched by Sam Houston to establish a fort to defend local settlers from attack by natives and bandits. The fort was located southeast of the city near the present location of Calloway's Lake on the north bank of the Trinity River near the current location of the Viridian subdivision. In 1849, after the establishment of Camp Worth, new settlements began arising in the area, including Birdville, which had a population around 50 by 1849, when Tarrant County was established. In August of the following year, Birdville was selected as the county seat, a title which it lost to Fort Worth in November 1856. In 1882, Birdville's first public school was established, and the Birdville Independent School District was established in 1896. The former area of Birdville was subsequently annexed by Haltom City in the latter part of the 20th century.
