= Charles F. O'Neall =

American mayor

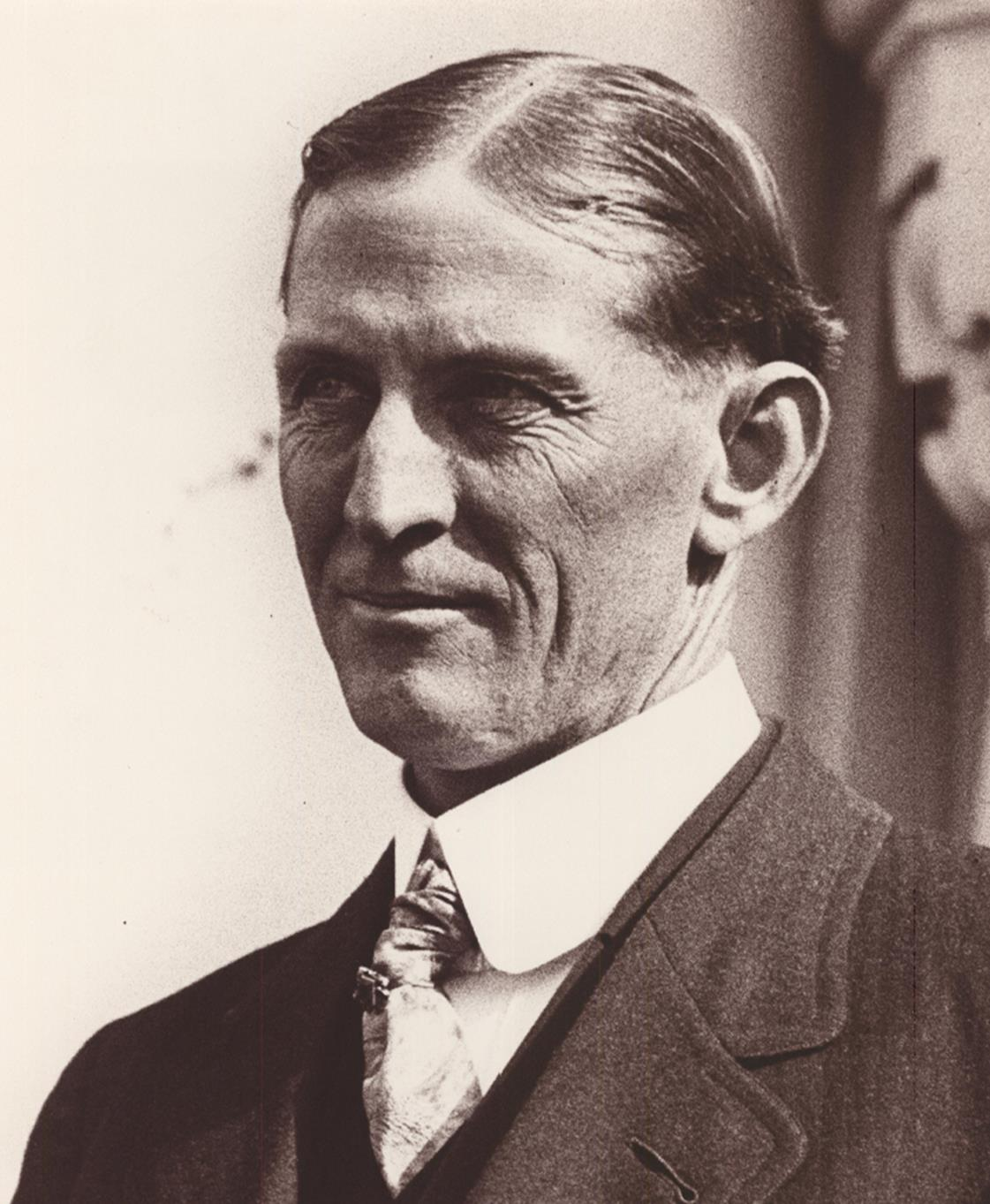

15th Mayor of San Diego
- In office May 5, 1913 – May 3, 1915
- Preceded by: James E. Wadham
- Succeeded by: Edwin M. Capps

Personal details
- Born: November 12, 1875 Birdville, Texas, U.S.
- Died: December 31, 1929 (aged 54) Lubbock, Texas, U.S.
- Party: Democratic

Charles F. O'Neall (November 12, 1875 – December 31, 1929) was an American real estate agent and Democratic politician from California.

He was born 1875 in Birdville, Texas, to James E. and Annie E. O'Neall. O'Neall attended public schools in Dallas, Texas, afterwards working at various stores, then at Midland, Texas, raising stock.

O'Neall married Annie May Townsend May 14, 1900, at Midland. They had three children, Ella, Annie, and Charles F., Jr.

In 1906 he moved to San Diego, California, where he became a successful real estate agent. He also became active in public affairs. He was president of the San Diego Realty Board during 1911–1913, served as a Fire Commissioner under Mayor John Forward Sr., and was director of the Chamber of Commerce. He was also active with the Democratic Party, serving as its County Central Committee chairman. He campaigned for Democrats President Wilson and Congressman William Kettner, and was chairman of the latter campaign.

O'Neall was elected mayor of San Diego and served from 1913 to 1915. With the support of the business community, defeated Department Store owner George Marston. It was a classic "Smokestacks versus Geraniums" campaign. The tourism and parks people supported Marston and the commerce and industry people supported O'Neall. Banker Louis Wilde said:

O'Neall is progressive, not narrow, conservative. ... Mr. Marston ... means well, but he has not got it in him to do broad things for anybody ... somehow or other every time a big vital movement has been started for the advancement of the city, Marston has been quietly against it ...

Four years later, Wilde would run for mayor and also win against Marston in a similar campaign.

O'Neall was mayor when the Panama–California Exposition opened in Balboa Park in 1915.

O'Neall died in Lubbock, Texas on December 31, 1929, of a heart attack.

== See also ==
- Black, Samuel T. (1913). San Diego County California. The S. J. Clark Publishing Company, Chicago., v. 2, pp. 133–34 : "Charles F. O'Neall"

Political offices
Preceded by James E. Wadham	Mayor of San Diego; 1913–1915	Succeeded by Edwin M. Capps
