= James E. Wadham =

American politician (1864–1930)

Jim Wadham
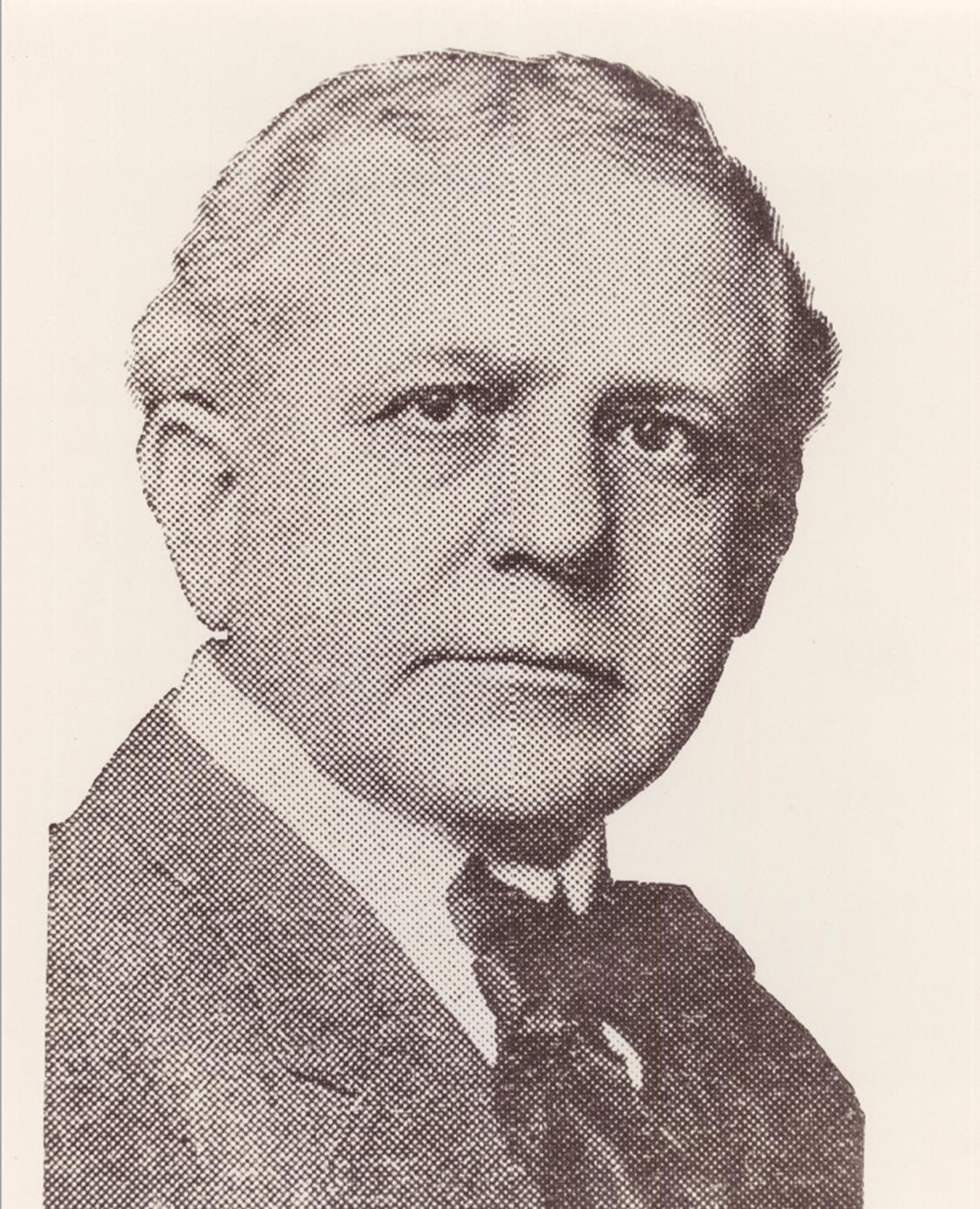
- Wadham in San Diego YearBook,1912

14th Mayor of San Diego
- In office May 1, 1911 – May 5, 1913
- Preceded by: Grant Conard
- Succeeded by: Charles F. O'Neall

Personal details
- Born: 1864 Illinois
- Died: May 26, 1930 (aged 65–66) San Diego, California
- Party: Democratic

James Echael Wadham (1864 – May 26, 1930) was an American Democratic politician from California.

Wadham was born in 1864 in Macomb, Illinois, but moved to San Diego, California, around 1870. He was a conservative Democratic attorney who ran for mayor of San Diego in 1903 but was defeated. He ran again a few years later and served as mayor from 1911 to 1913. He was elected with the help of trade unions.

== Wadham and Wobblies ==
The Industrial Workers of the World (IWW or "Wobblies") were a militant labor union seeking to organize unskilled workers. San Diegans were uneasy because the Mexican Revolution of 1910 had recently occurred, and the border with Mexico was nearby. San Diego, as did many local governments, passed ordinances against any kind of public demonstration. In 1912, Wobblies came to challenge the San Diego ordinances by getting arrested in significant numbers, and filling the city jail. But private vigilante groups, apparently working in cooperation with the police, took the Wobblies out of town and beat them up.

Vincent Saint John, a leader of the Wobblies, sent a telegram to Wadham which stated, "This fight will be continued until free speech is established in San Diego if it takes 20,000 members and 20 years to do so." That only made the San Diego vigilantes, newspapers, and city and county government dig in their heels and more determined to get rid of the Wobblies at any cost.

Anarchists Emma Goldman and Ben Reitman came to town to lecture, against the advice of mayor Wadham. After they arrived, Wadham went to Reitman and said:

You hear that mob, they mean business. They want to get you and Reitman out of the hotel, even if they have to take you by force. We cannot guarantee anything. If you consent to leave, we will give you protection and get you safely out of town.

Reitman suggested the police disperse the vigilantes just as they did the Wobblies. Wadham replied:

We can't do it. These people are in a dangerous mood, and your presence makes things worse.

Reitman refused protection, and Wadham gave up and left. Reitman was kidnapped from his hotel room by the vigilantes, stripped, tortured, branded, tarred, and sent out of town. Goldman fled in the meantime. The San Diego free speech fight eventually diminished.

Political offices
Preceded by Grant Conard	Mayor of San Diego, California; 1911–1913	Succeeded by Charles F. O'Neall
