= George Marston (California politician) =

American politician, businessperson, and philanthropist

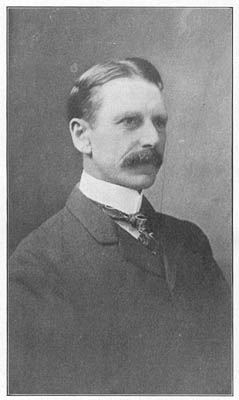
- Born: George White Marston; October 22, 1850; Fort Atkinson, Wisconsin, U.S.
- Died: May 31, 1946 (aged 95); San Diego, California, U.S.
- Occupations: Department store owner, politician, and philanthropist
- Spouse: Anna Lee Gunn
- Children: 5

George White Marston (October 22, 1850 – May 31, 1946) was an American politician, department store owner, and philanthropist. Marston was involved with establishing Balboa Park, Presidio Park, and the San Diego Public Library. His contributions to San Diego earned him the affectionate title of "San Diego's First Citizen."

== Early life and career ==
Marston was born in Fort Atkinson, Wisconsin. As a boy, Marston learned to ice skate, which he continued to enjoy throughout his life. His father had a chronic respiratory ailment and wanted to live in a better climate for his health, so the family moved to San Diego in 1870.

Marston was initially a clerk in the Horton House Hotel, then entered the mercantile business as a bookkeeper with the firm of Aaron Pauly & Sons general merchandise store and warehouse merchants. Pauly was the founder of the San Diego Chamber of Commerce. Marston was its secretary and later its president.

In 1872, Marston clerked for storekeeper Joseph Nash. He and partner Charles Hamilton bought Nash out and ran the store. After Marston's marriage, he split the store business with his partner Hamilton, with Hamilton taking the grocery side and Marston taking the dry goods. The Marston Company, at 5th Avenue and C Street in downtown San Diego, became the only major department store in the city. In later years, two additional suburban stores opened. Their success was due to exclusive business arrangements that Marston made with several suppliers. He became quite wealthy and was a generous philanthropist in the city. The stores were sold to The Broadway in 1961. The downtown flagship store has since closed.

Marston's business trips took him to major cities such as San Francisco and New York City, where he saw great urban parks. This developed a desire to see San Diego's Balboa Park become as great. As a result of his efforts in park development and planning, Marston helped make Balboa Park a local landmark. Marston hired architect John Nolen to develop the first plan for the park in 1908 and a more-detailed plan in 1926.

Marston served as chairman of the Buildings and Grounds Committee for the 1915 Panama–California Exposition in Balboa Park. The Exposition established an infrastructure of museums and attractions for the park that still exists today.

A statue by Ruth Hayward of Marston with other significant founders of San Diego stands in Balboa Park.

With Ed Fletcher, Marston developed the Pine Hills area.

== Philanthropy ==
In 1907, Marston bought Presidio Hill with the intent of preserving the old Presidio of San Diego, the first European settlement in present-day California, which had fallen into ruins. He couldn't get anyone interested in the project, so he built Presidio Park in 1925 with his own funds, hiring Nolen to plan the park. He commissioned the building of the Serra Museum, designed by architect William Templeton Johnson, in Presidio Park. He donated the park to the city in 1929. Presidio Park, still a city-owned historic park, is now listed on the National Register of Historic Places.

Marston served on the first board of trustees for the San Diego Public Library in 1882 and founded the San Diego YMCA, serving as its president for 22 years. He was on the city council from 1887 to 1889. In 1928 he founded the San Diego Historical Society (now the San Diego History Center) and served as its first president. Marston also raised funds and donated his own money to buy land for present-day Torrey Pines State Natural Reserve and Anza-Borrego Desert State Park.

Marston served as a founding trustee for Pomona College and funded a number of the campus's early buildings. He gave $100,000 (equivalent to $1,857,006 in 2025) to endow the college's central quadrangle, which is named after him.

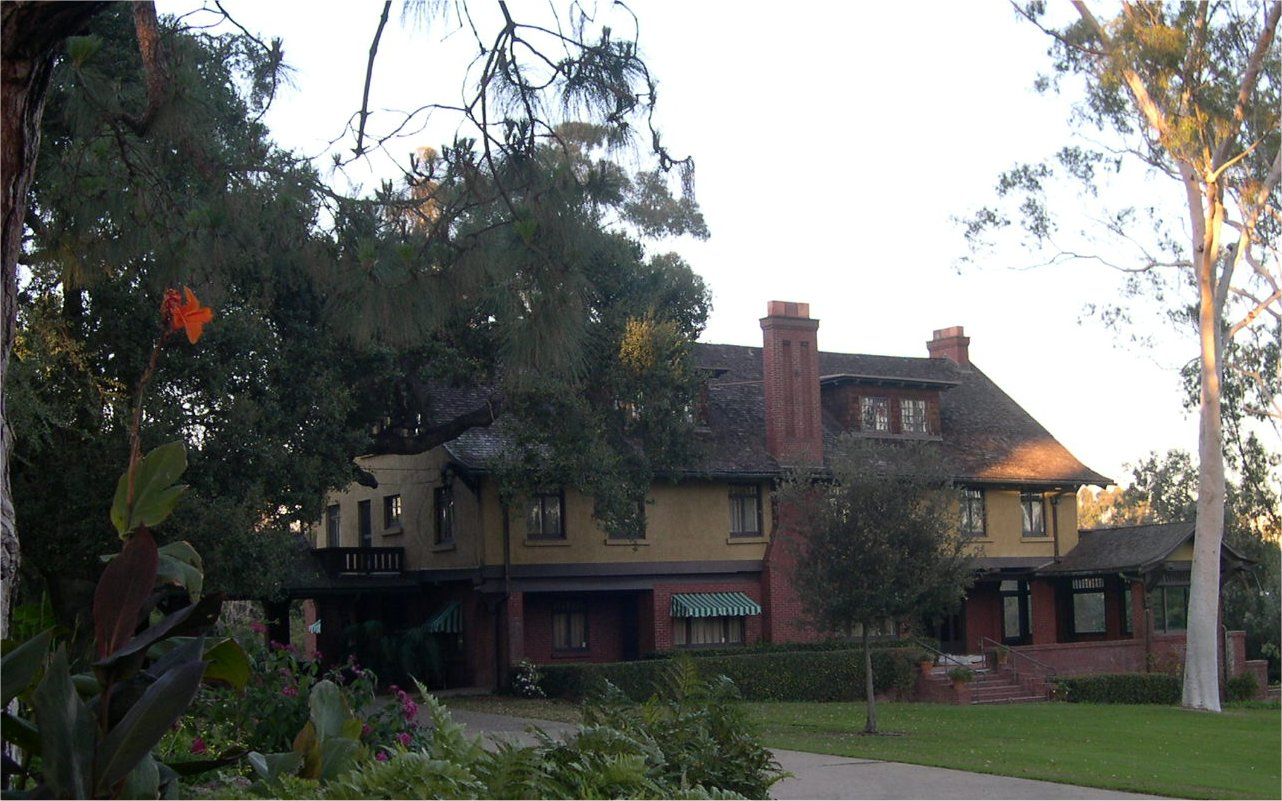
George W. Marston House and Gardens

George Marston's Residence at 3525 Seventh Avenue was designed by Irving Gill and William S. Hebbard architects in 1904/1905. The residence initially was planned to be built in English Tudor style, but was completed in the Arts and Crafts style, which was becoming in vogue. The property, dubbed the George W. Marston House and Gardens, was donated to the City of San Diego by Marston's daughter Mary in 1987 and is now a museum at the northwest corner of Balboa Park. Save Our Heritage Organisation (SOHO) took over operation of the property in July 2009 and is in the process of restoring the gardens and furnishing the home in appropriate period style.

== Politics ==
Marston was active politically and called himself an "independent". He was raised a Republican, but swung back and forth between Democrat and Republican, supporting the party or person most likely to push for reform. He supported California's reform-oriented Progressive Party in the 1910s and early 1920s.

Marston ran for mayor unsuccessfully in 1913 (against Charles F. O'Neall) and again in 1917 (against Louis J. Wilde). The 1917 race, in particular, was a classic growth-vs.-beautification debate. Marston argued for better city planning with more open space and grand boulevards; Wilde argued for more business development. Wilde called his opponent "Geranium George", painting Marston as unfriendly to business. Wilde's campaign slogan was "More Smokestacks", and during the campaign, he drew a great smokestack belching smoke on a truck through the city streets. The phrase "smokestacks vs. geraniums" is still used in San Diego to characterize this type of debate. Local horticulturist Jim Zemcik has produced a "Geranium George" series of geranium varieties in Marston's honor, including one variety named for his wife Anna Gunn Marston, who was an avid gardener.

== Personal life ==
In 1878, he married Anna Lee Gunn (May 20, 1853 – October 7, 1940), a teacher. They had five children. Her brother Douglas Gunn was the owner and editor of San Diego Union and served as the mayor of San Diego from 1889 to 1891.

George Marston died at age 95 at his home in San Diego. He is interred in Mount Hope Cemetery. For the eulogy at his funeral, James A. Blaisdell spoke of Marston's impact on Balboa Park, "Just around the corner lies the central Balboa Park of the city—walks that he laid out—flowers that he planted—trees that he loved—vistas that he foresaw—beautiful buildings that he envisioned. ... This paradise was not here when George Marston came [in 1870]. In this park he speaks to thousands whose lives have been made happier through him."

== Quote ==
I feel the development of the city's beauty and civic welfare can go along with the industrial development ... I am in favor of all things that make for commerce, manufacturing, for all business activity . . . It is absurd to say that I am not in favor of industrial development. I believe in a Greater San Diego—everything that makes for a bigger city. Let us build a great city on a good foundation. Let us have our industries as large as possible. Let us build a complete city.

== See also ==
- George White Marston: A Family Chronicle (1956), compiled by his daughter Mary Gilman Marston.
- George White Marston and the San Diego Progressives, 1913-1917, San Diego State University thesis, 1976, by Uldis A. Ports.
- City Planning, Progressivism, and the Development of San Diego, 1908–1926, San Diego State University thesis, 1977 by Gregg R. Hennessey.
- George White Marston Collection, Papers and records, 1870–1946, MS 219, San Diego Historical Society.
