= Grant Conard =

American politician (1867–1919)

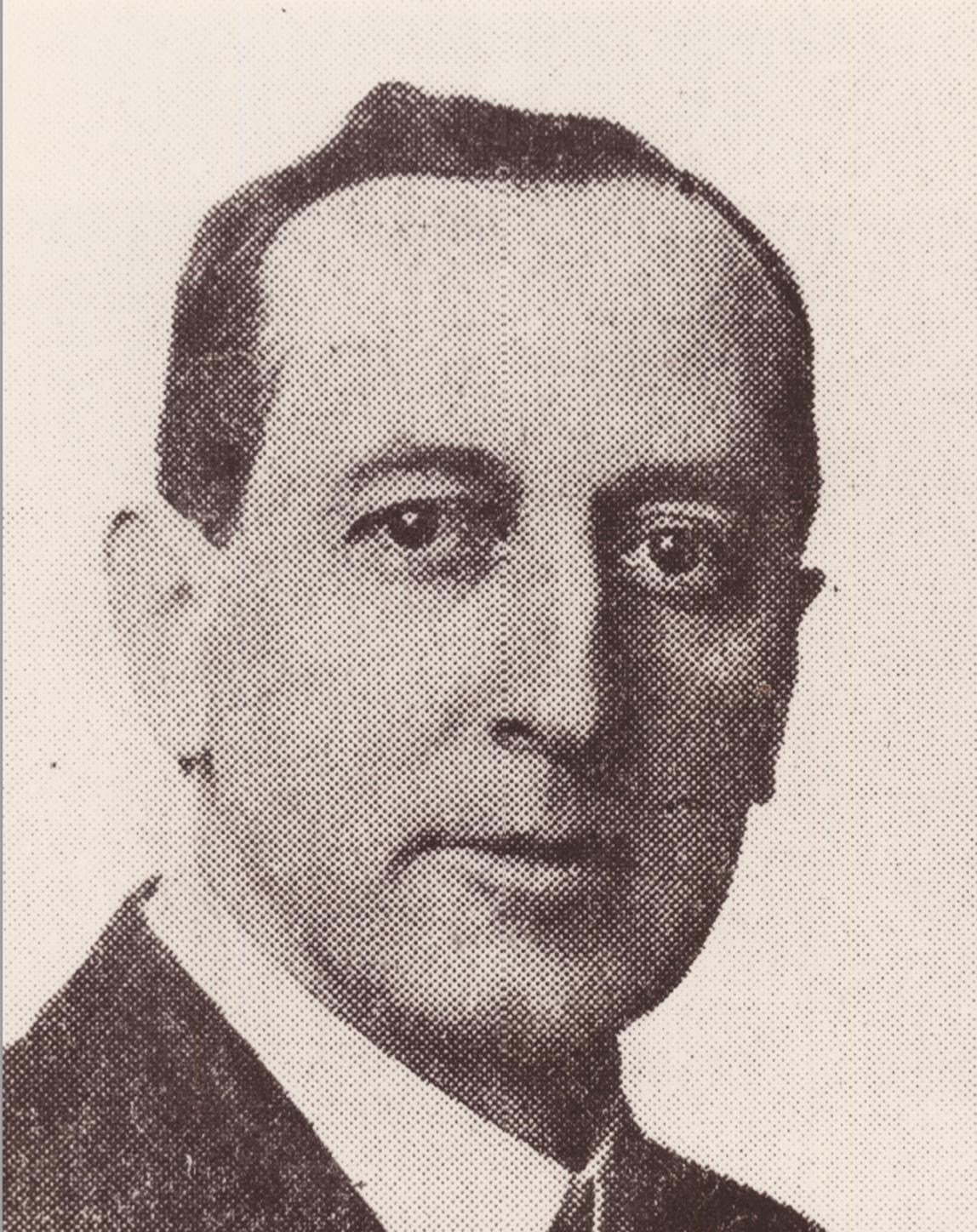

Member of the California State Assembly from the 79th district
- In office January 4, 1915 – January 8, 1917
- Preceded by: Edward Cunningham Hinkle
- Succeeded by: Hugh J. Baldwin

13th Mayor of San Diego
- In office May 3, 1909 – May 1, 1911
- Preceded by: John F. Forward Sr.
- Succeeded by: James E. Wadham

Personal details
- Born: August 5, 1867 LaSalle County, Illinois, U.S.
- Died: November 5, 1919 (aged 52) San Diego, California, U.S.
- Party: Republican
- Spouse: Mildred Shaver

Grant Conard (August 5, 1867 – November 5, 1919) was an American Republican politician from California.

Grant Conard was born on August 5, 1867, in LaSalle County, Illinois. He was a real estate developer. He was mayor of San Diego during 1909–1911, and from 1915 to 1917 he served in the California State Assembly for the 79th district.

Conard died November 5, 1919, in San Diego, aged 52.

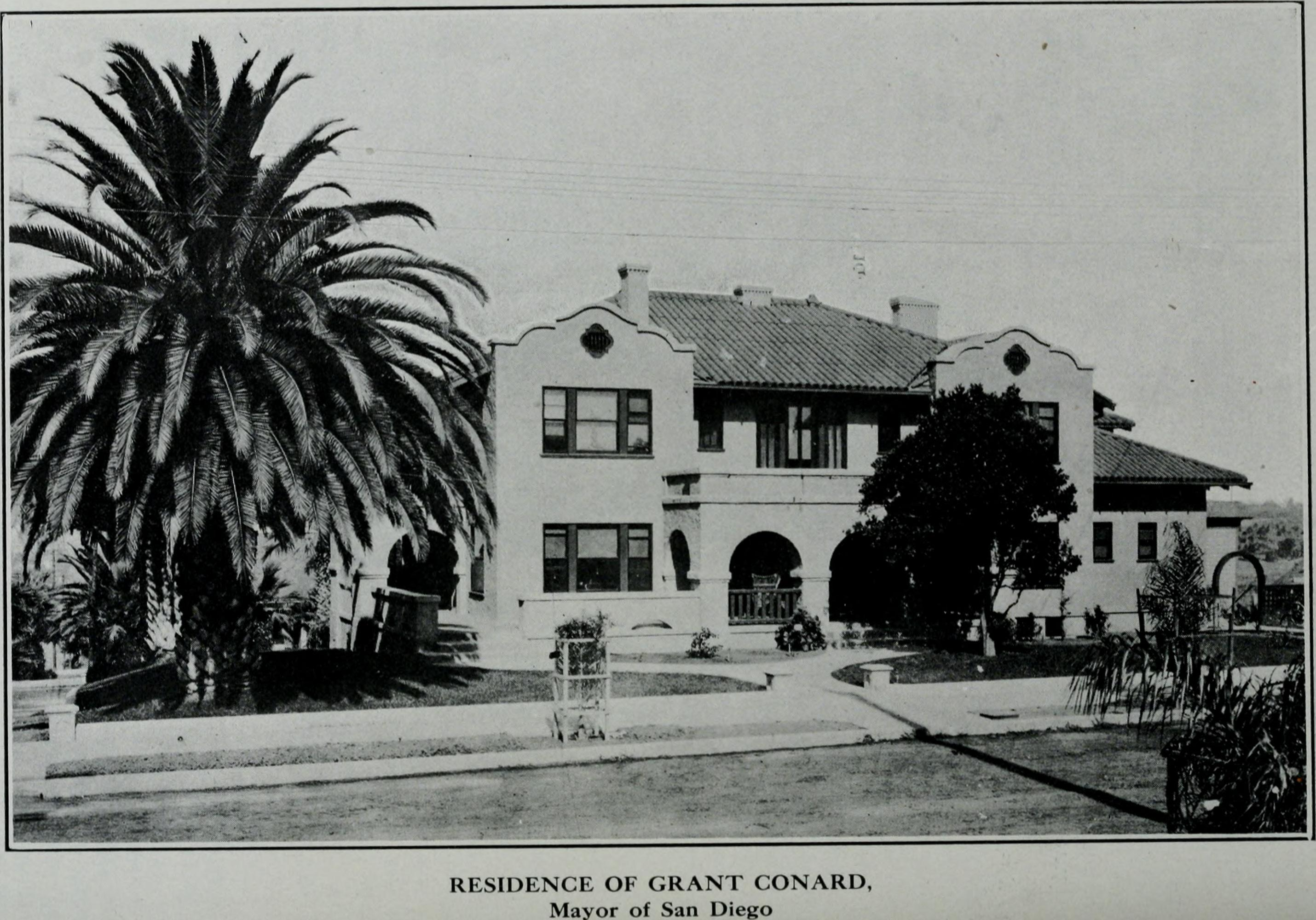
Residence of Grant Conard

Political offices
Preceded by John F. Forward Sr.	Mayor of San Diego; 1909–1911	Succeeded by James E. Wadham
