= John L. Sehon =

11th Mayor of San Diego (1862–1913)

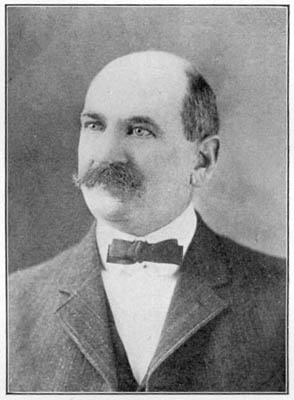

11th Mayor of San Diego
- In office May 1, 1905 – May 6, 1907
- Preceded by: Frank P. Frary
- Succeeded by: John F. Forward Sr.

Personal details
- Born: June 9, 1862 Atlanta, Georgia
- Died: May 18, 1913 (aged 50) San Diego, California
- Party: Democratic

John Leicester Sehon (June 9, 1862 – May 18, 1913) was an American Democratic politician from California.

== Biography ==
Sehon was born on June 9, 1862, in Atlanta, Georgia. He served in the army as a captain. Sehon was elected to the city council and set an independent course as a council member. In 1905 an "anti-boss" mood with San Diego voters caused them to defeat the Republican candidate and elect retired Captain Sehon, of the Democratic and Independent coalition, as mayor of San Diego, California, which he served until 1907. This defeated the "City Boss" organization of Charles S. Hardy, a successful merchant and leader of the city's most powerful political organization ever.

During his campaign he emphasized the idea that the public owned the water supply and was a leader in a reform movement in his previous service in the city council. A controversy rose during the campaign about whether a retired army officer could legally run for a civil office. Just to make sure there wouldn't be a problem Capt. Sehon disappeared after being elected so court papers couldn't be served on him, and just before midnight when his term began he stole into the mayor's office and proclaimed himself mayor. Court proceedings took place after the fact, where the Superior Court decided against the mayor, but was overruled by the Court of Appeals and California Supreme Court.

While mayor, Sehon vetoed a proposal to give the Southern California Mountain Water Company a monopoly to supply water to San Diego. John D. Spreckels, of the Spreckels Sugar Company, poured money into city council races to overturn this veto.

Later, Sehon was Superintendent of Police in the early 1910s. After a public campaign against prostitution by many prominent citizens, Sehon gave the order in November 1912 to close the "Stingaree District". He died in San Diego on May 18, 1913, and is buried at Mount Hope Cemetery.

Political offices
Preceded by Frank P. Frary	Mayor of San Diego; 1905–1907	Succeeded by John F. Forward Sr.
