= John F. Forward Sr. =

American mayor of San Diego (1851–1926)

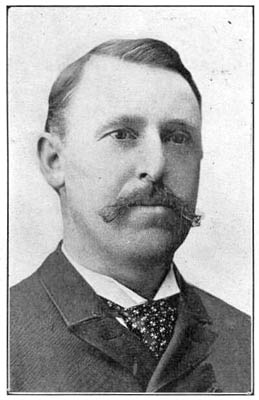

12th Mayor of San Diego
- In office May 6, 1907 – May 3, 1909
- Preceded by: John L. Sehon
- Succeeded by: Grant Conard

Personal details
- Born: October 3, 1851 Pittsburgh, Pennsylvania
- Died: December 24, 1926 (aged 75) San Diego, California
- Party: Republican
- Spouse: Ella Dillon November
- Children: 7, including John Jr.

John F. Forward Sr. (October 3, 1851 – December 24, 1926) was an American Republican politician from California.

Forward was born in 1851 in Pittsburgh, Pennsylvania, to Walter and Elizabeth Forward. His grandfather, Walter Forward, was U. S. Secretary of the Treasury. In 1866, he started working as a machinist and continued for seven years. He then joined the Pennsylvania Railroad as a fireman.

Forward married Ella Dillon in November 1874 in Pittsburgh, and they had seven children: John F. Forward Jr., who was also mayor, James D., Annie D., Walter L., Joseph C., Frank G., and Charles Hamilton Forward Sr., attorney, and partner in the Luce Forward law firm in San Diego, grandson Charles H. Forward Jr. of Hanalei, Hawaii, and great-grandson Charles H. Forward III of Honolulu, Hawaii.

Forward came to San Diego in 1887. In San Diego, he worked in San Diego County's recorder office for 19 years, and, from 1892, headed the office for 14 of those years.

In 1903, Forward founded Union Title and Trust Company and, after resigning as recorder, directed it for nine years as its president.

Forward was mayor of San Diego during 1907–1909. He was elected on an anti-establishment campaign with only 39% of the vote. Since that time, runoffs have been required if nobody receives a majority of the vote for mayor.

Forward was a prominent citizen, a "staunch republican," and strongly supported unions as the "salvation of the working man."

Forward died in 1926, aged 75, in San Diego.

Political offices
Preceded by John L. Sehon	Mayor of San Diego, California; 1907–1909	Succeeded by Grant Conard
