= 1935 San Diego mayoral election =

← 1932	April 23, 1935	1939 →
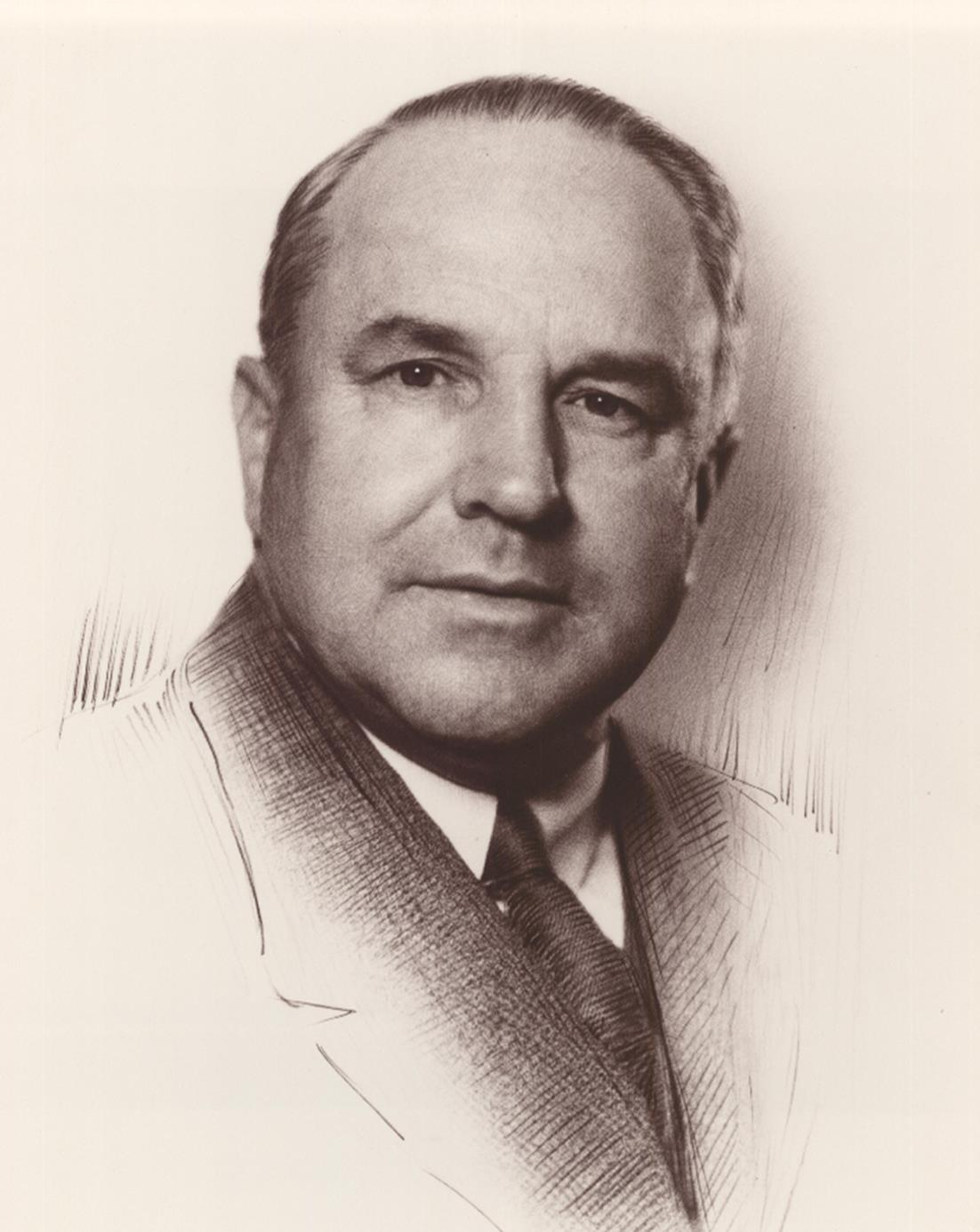

Nominee	Percy J. Benbough	A. Ray Sauer Jr.
Party	Republican	Nonpartisan
Popular vote	22,190	18,615
Percentage	54.4%	45.6%
Mayor before election
Albert W. Bennett (acting)
Republican
Elected mayor
Percy J. Benbough
Republican

The 1935 San Diego mayoral election was held on April 23, 1935, to elect the mayor for San Diego. Two mayors had resigned since the previous mayoral election, and no incumbent mayor stood for reelection. In the primary election, Percy J. Benbough and A. Ray Sauer Jr. received the most votes and advanced to a runoff election. Benbough was then elected mayor with a majority of the votes in the runoff.

== Candidates ==
- Percy J. Benbough, mortician and mayoral candidate in 1927
- A. Ray Sauer Jr.
- Harry Steinmetz, San Diego State College teacher
- William E. Harper
- Henry B. Cramer
- Le Roy E. Goodbody
- Daniel M. Denton
- C. Leon De Aryan
- Rufus S. Hendon

== Campaign ==
Previously elected mayor John F. Forward Jr. had resigned mid-term and did not contest the 1935 election. His appointed replacement, Rutherford B. Irones had also resigned prior to the election and did not contest it. Vice Mayor Albert W. Bennett served as acting mayor during the campaign. Bennett did not contest the election.

Several civic leaders who called themselves the Civic Affairs Conference endorsed a slate of candidates for the 1935 mayoral and city council elections. The convention endorsed local businessman Percy J. Benbough as their candidate for mayor. Another challenger was Harry C. Steinmetz, a teacher at San Diego State College who ran a socialistic campaign endorsing full public ownership of all utilities.

On March 26, 1935, Benbough came in first in the primary election with 34.6 percent of the votes, followed by A. Ray Sauer Jr., son of the publisher of a weekly newspaper, in second place with 20.5 percent. Steinmetz finished third with 12.4 percent of the vote, and was eliminated from the runoff. Since no candidate received a majority of the vote, Benbough and Sauer advanced to a runoff election. On April 23, 1935, Benbough came in first place in the runoff election with 54.3 percent of the vote and was elected to the office of the mayor.

== Primary election results ==
1935 San Diego mayoral primary election
Party	Candidate	Votes	%
Republican	Percy J. Benbough	12,443	34.6
Nonpartisan	A. Ray Sauer Jr.	7,349	20.5
Socialist	Harry C. Steinmetz	4,470	12.4
Nonpartisan	William E. Harper	3,875	10.8
Nonpartisan	Henry B. Cramer	3,629	10.1
Nonpartisan	Le Roy E. Goodbody	3,161	8.8
Nonpartisan	Daniel M. Denton	444	1.2
Nonpartisan	C. Leon De Aryan	339	0.9
Nonpartisan	Rufus S. Hendon	229	0.6
Total votes		35,939	100

== General election results ==
1935 San Diego mayoral general election
Party	Candidate	Votes	%
Republican	Percy J. Benbough	22,190	54.4
Nonpartisan	A. Ray Sauer Jr.	18,615	45.6
Total votes		40,805	100
