= 1951 San Diego mayoral election =

← 1947	April 17, 1951	1955 →
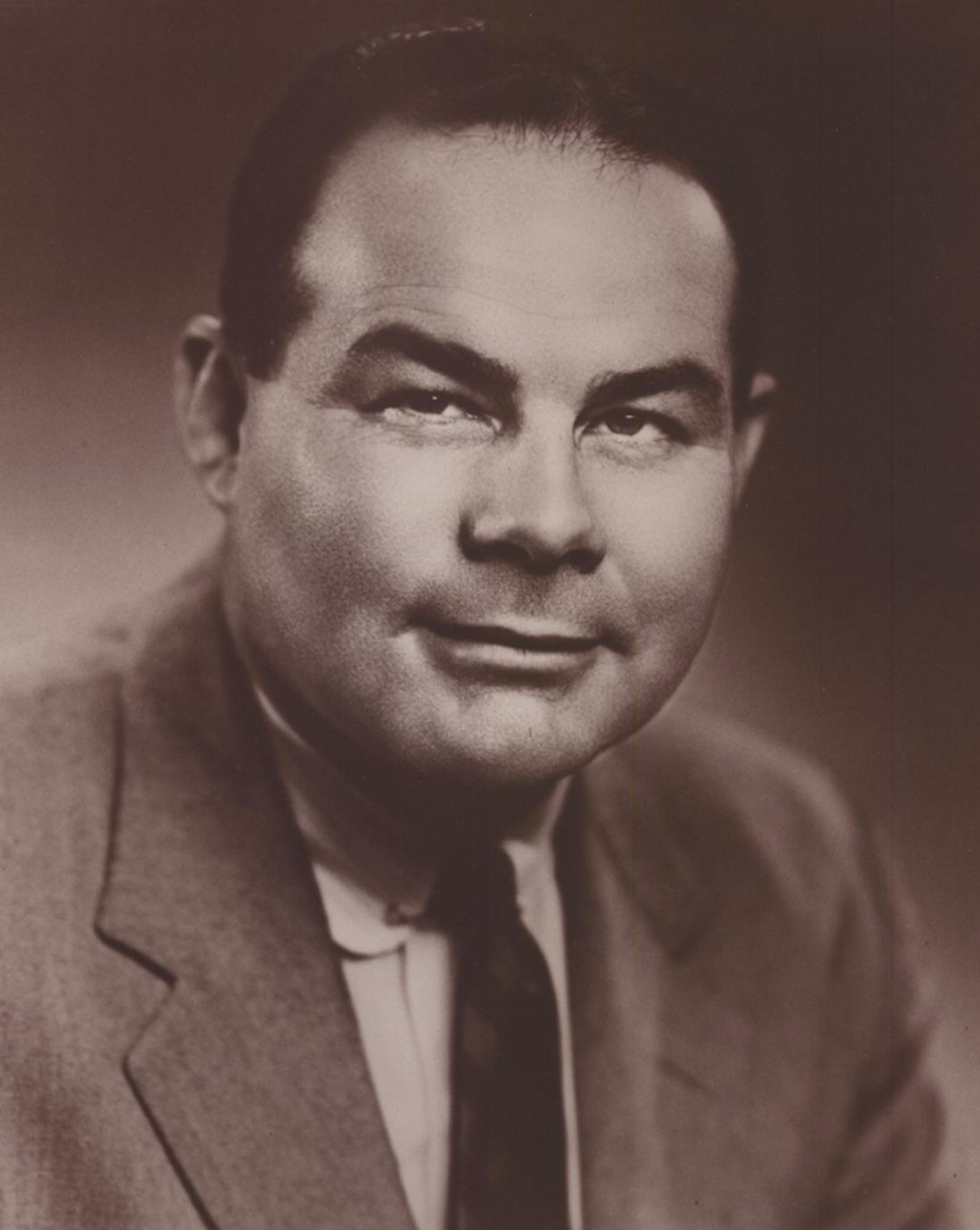

Nominee	John D. Butler	Gerald C. Crary
Party	Republican	Nonpartisan
Popular vote	46,400	31,501
Percentage	59.6%	40.4%
Mayor before election
Harley E. Knox
Republican
Elected mayor
John D. Butler
Republican

The 1951 San Diego mayoral election was held on April 17, 1951 to elect the mayor for San Diego. Incumbent mayor Harley E. Knox did not stand for reelection. In the primary election, Gerald C. Crary and John D. Butler received the most votes and advanced to a runoff election. Butler was then elected mayor with a majority of the votes in the runoff.

== Candidates ==
- John D. Butler, attorney
- Gerald C. Crary, former member of the San Diego City Council
- Fred A. Rhodes, former City Manager and Public Works Director
- Lilliam A. Johnson, realtor
- Hugh V. Knox, former reporter
- Clifton L. Voorhies, golf professional
- Edwin F. Murphy, realtor

== Campaign ==
Incumbent Mayor Harley E. Knox chose not stand for reelection on the advice of his physician. On March 13, 1951, Gerald C. Crary came first in the primary election with 33.5 percent of the vote, followed by John D. Butler with 25.9 percent. Because no candidate received a majority of the vote, Crary and Butler advanced to a runoff election. On April 17, 1951, Butler received 59.6 percent of the vote in the runoff and was elected to the office of the mayor. Butler was the youngest mayor to have been elected as well as the first to be born in San Diego.

== Primary Election results ==
San Diego mayoral primary election, 1951
Party	Candidate	Votes	%
Nonpartisan	Gerald C. Crary	22,959	33.5
Republican	John D. Butler	17,728	25.9
Nonpartisan	Fred A. Rhodes	15,918	23.2
Nonpartisan	Lilliam A. Johnson	7,619	11.1
Nonpartisan	Hugh V. Knox	2,045	3.0
Nonpartisan	Clifton L. Voorhies	1,371	2.0
Nonpartisan	Edwin F. Murphy	877	1.3
Total votes		68,517	100

== General Election results ==
San Diego mayoral general election, 1951
Party	Candidate	Votes	%
Republican	John D. Butler	46,400	59.6
Nonpartisan	Gerald C. Crary	31,501	40.4
Total votes		77,901	100
