= 1943 San Diego mayoral election =

- April 20, 1943
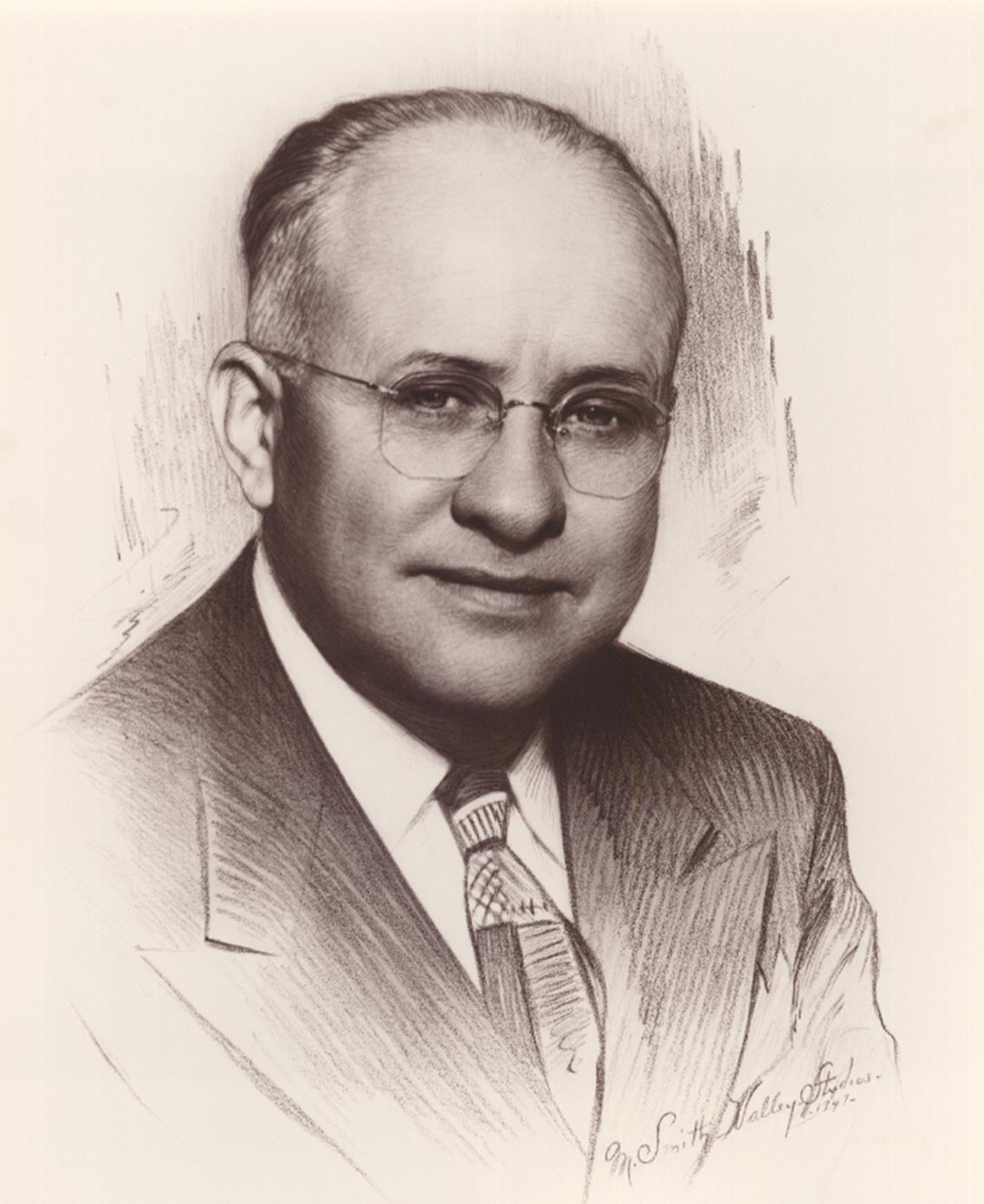

Nominee	Harley E. Knox	James B. Abbey
Party	Republican	Nonpartisan
Popular vote	25,353	11,913
Percentage	68.0%	32.0%
Mayor before election
Howard B. Bard
Democratic
Elected mayor
Harley E. Knox
Republican

The 1943 San Diego mayoral election was held on April 20, 1943, to elect the mayor for San Diego. Appointed incumbent mayor Howard B. Bard did not stand for election to a term of his own. In the primary election, Harley E. Knox and James B. Abbey received the most votes and advanced to a runoff election. Knox was then elected mayor with a majority of the votes in the runoff.

== Candidates ==
- Harley E. Knox, member of the San Diego City Council
- James B. Abbey
- Fred W. Simpson
- Albert E. Flowers

== Campaign ==
Previously elected Mayor Percy J. Benbough had died in office mid-term of natural causes. Howard B. Bard was appointed to finish the balance of Benbough's term. Bard did not stand for election for a term of his own.

On March 9, 1943, Harley E. Knox came in first in the primary election with 43.4 percent of the votes, followed by James B. Abbey in second place with 32.0 percent. Because they had the two highest vote tallies, Knox and Abbey advanced to the runoff election. On April 20, 1943, Knox came in first place in the runoff election with 68.0 percent of the vote and was elected to the office of the mayor.

== Primary Election results ==
San Diego mayoral primary election, 1943
Party	Candidate	Votes	%
Republican	Harley E. Knox	15,141	43.4
Nonpartisan	James B. Abbey	11,172	32.0
Republican	Fred W. Simpson	6,779	19.4
Nonpartisan	Albert E. Flowers	1,795	5.2
Total votes		34,887	100

== General Election results ==
San Diego mayoral general election, 1943
Party	Candidate	Votes	%
Republican	Harley E. Knox	25,353	68.0
Nonpartisan	James B. Abbey	11,913	32.0
Total votes		37,266	100
