= John Forward =

John Forward may refer to:

- John F. Forward Jr., American politician from California
- John F. Forward Sr., his father, American politician from California
