= First Unitarian Universalist Church =

First Unitarian Universalist Church may refer to:

- First Unitarian Universalist Church of San Diego
- First Unitarian Church of San Jose, San Jose, California, named First Unitarian Universalist Church in its listing on the National Register of Historic Places (NRHP)
- First Unitarian Universalist Church of Niagara, Niagara Falls, New York, listed on the NRHP
- All Souls Church (Braintree, Massachusetts), also known as the First Unitarian Universalist Church
- First Unitarian Universalist Church of Richmond, Virginia
