= 1955 San Diego mayoral election =

- April 19, 1955
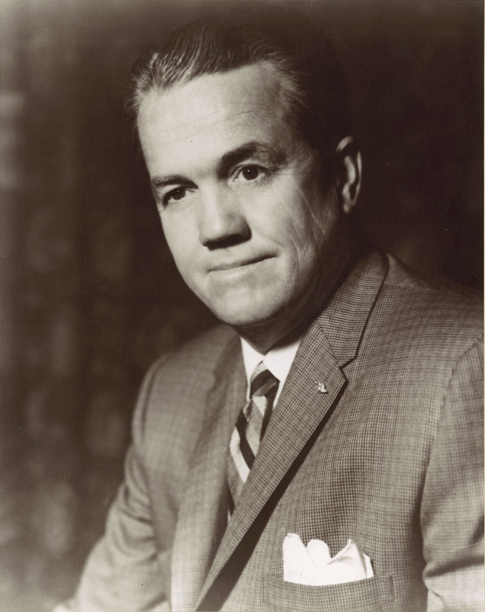

Nominee	Charles Dail	Harry L. Foster
Party	Democratic	Nonpartisan
Popular vote	42,897	41,660
Percentage	50.7%	49.3%
Mayor before election
John D. Butler
Republican
Elected mayor
Charles Dail
Democratic

The 1955 San Diego mayoral election was held on April 19, 1955 to elect the mayor for San Diego. Incumbent mayor John D. Butler did not stand for reelection. In the primary election, Charles Dail and Harry L. Foster received the most votes and advanced to a runoff election. Dail was then elected mayor with a majority of the votes in the runoff.

== Candidates ==
- Charles Dail, former member of the San Diego City Council
- Harry L. Foster
- Jerome W. Rudrauff
- Robert L. Stevenson
- Gerard A. Dougherty
- Sol Blanc
- Emilio P. Adams
- Richard L. Parsons

== Campaign ==
Incumbent Mayor John D. Butler did not stand for reelection. On March 8, 1955, Charles Dail came first in the primary election with 39.4 percent of the vote, followed by Harry L. Foster with 27.5 percent. Because no candidate received a majority of the vote, Dail and Foster advanced to a runoff election. On April 19, 1955, Dail received 50.7 percent of the vote in the runoff and was elected to the office of the mayor.

== Primary Election results ==
San Diego mayoral primary election, 1955
Party	Candidate	Votes	%
Democratic	Charles Dail	29,097	39.4
Nonpartisan	Harry L. Foster	20,286	27.5
Nonpartisan	Jerome W. Rudrauff	16,810	22.8
Nonpartisan	Robert L. Stevenson	2,731	3.7
Nonpartisan	Gerard A. Dougherty	1,396	1.9
Nonpartisan	Sol Blanc	1,357	1.8
Nonpartisan	Emilio P. Adams	1,220	1.7
Nonpartisan	Richard L. Parsons	985	1.3
Total votes		73,882	100

== General Election results ==
San Diego mayoral general election, 1955
Party	Candidate	Votes	%
Democratic	Charles Dail	42,897	50.7
Nonpartisan	Harry L. Foster	41,660	49.3
Total votes		84,557	100
