= 1947 San Diego mayoral election =

- March 11, 1947
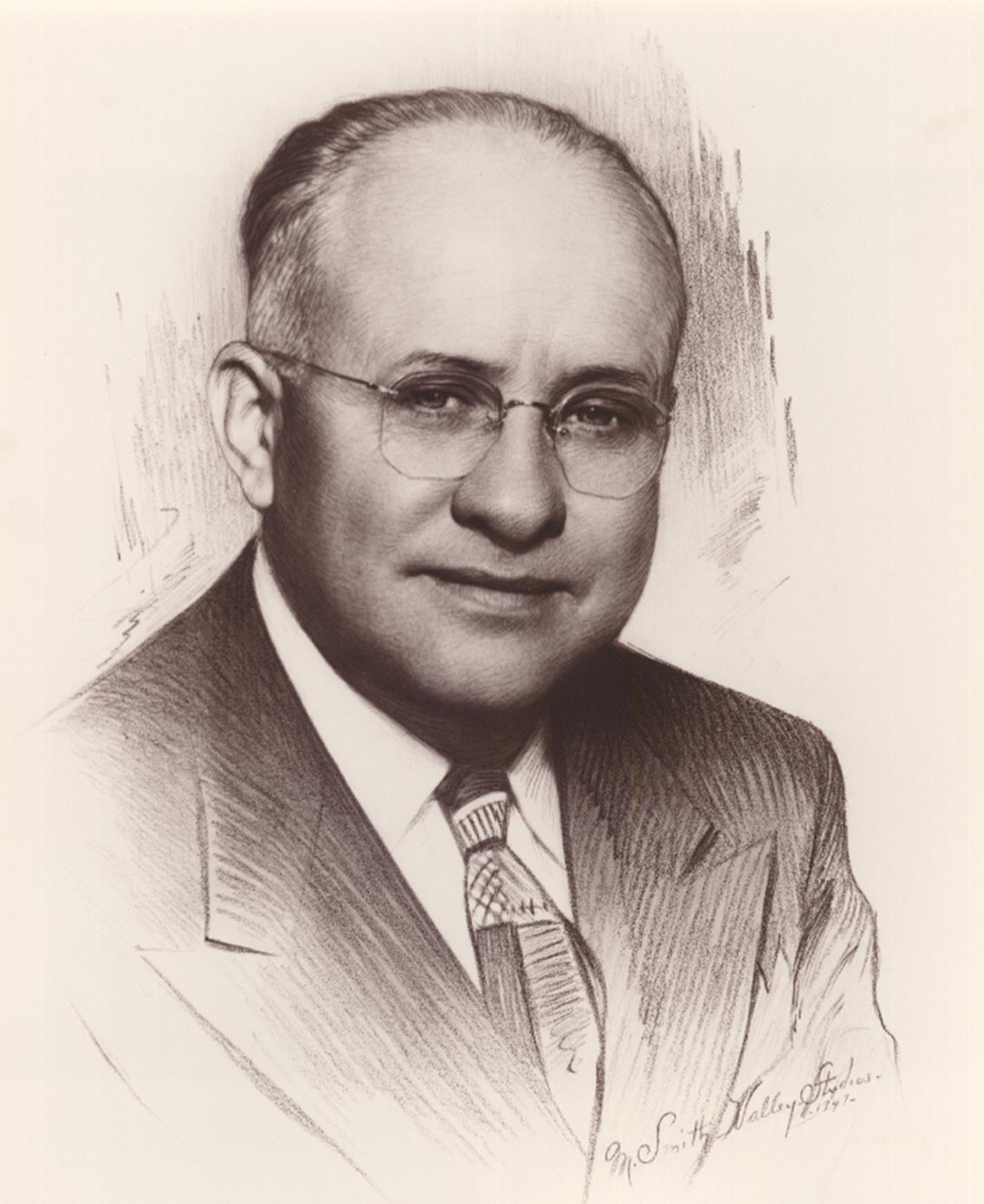

Nominee	Harley E. Knox	Edgar F. Hastings
Party	Republican	Nonpartisan
Popular vote	27,432	8,134
Percentage	67.9%	20.1%
Mayor before election
Harley E. Knox
Republican
Elected mayor
Harley E. Knox
Republican

The 1947 San Diego mayoral election was held on March 11, 1947, to elect the mayor for San Diego. Incumbent mayor Harley E. Knox stood for reelection to a second term. In the primary election, Knox received a majority of the votes and was elected outright with no need for a runoff.

== Candidates ==
- Harley E. Knox, mayor of San Diego
- Edgar F. Hastings
- Joseph G. Shea

== Campaign ==
Incumbent Mayor Harley E. Knox stood for reelection to a second term. On March 11, 1947, Knox received a majority of 67.9 percent of the vote in the primary election. This was more than 47 percent higher than what was received by Edgar F. Hastings, his nearest competitor. Because Knox was elected outright in the primary, no runoff election was held.

== Primary Election results ==
San Diego mayoral primary election, 1947
Party	Candidate	Votes	%
Republican	Harley E. Knox (incumbent)	27,432	67.9
Nonpartisan	Edgar F. Hastings	8,134	20.1
Nonpartisan	Joseph G. Shea	4,843	19.4
Total votes		40,409	100

== General Election results ==
Because Knox received a majority of the votes in the primary, no general election was held.
