= 1927 San Diego mayoral election =

- April 5, 1927
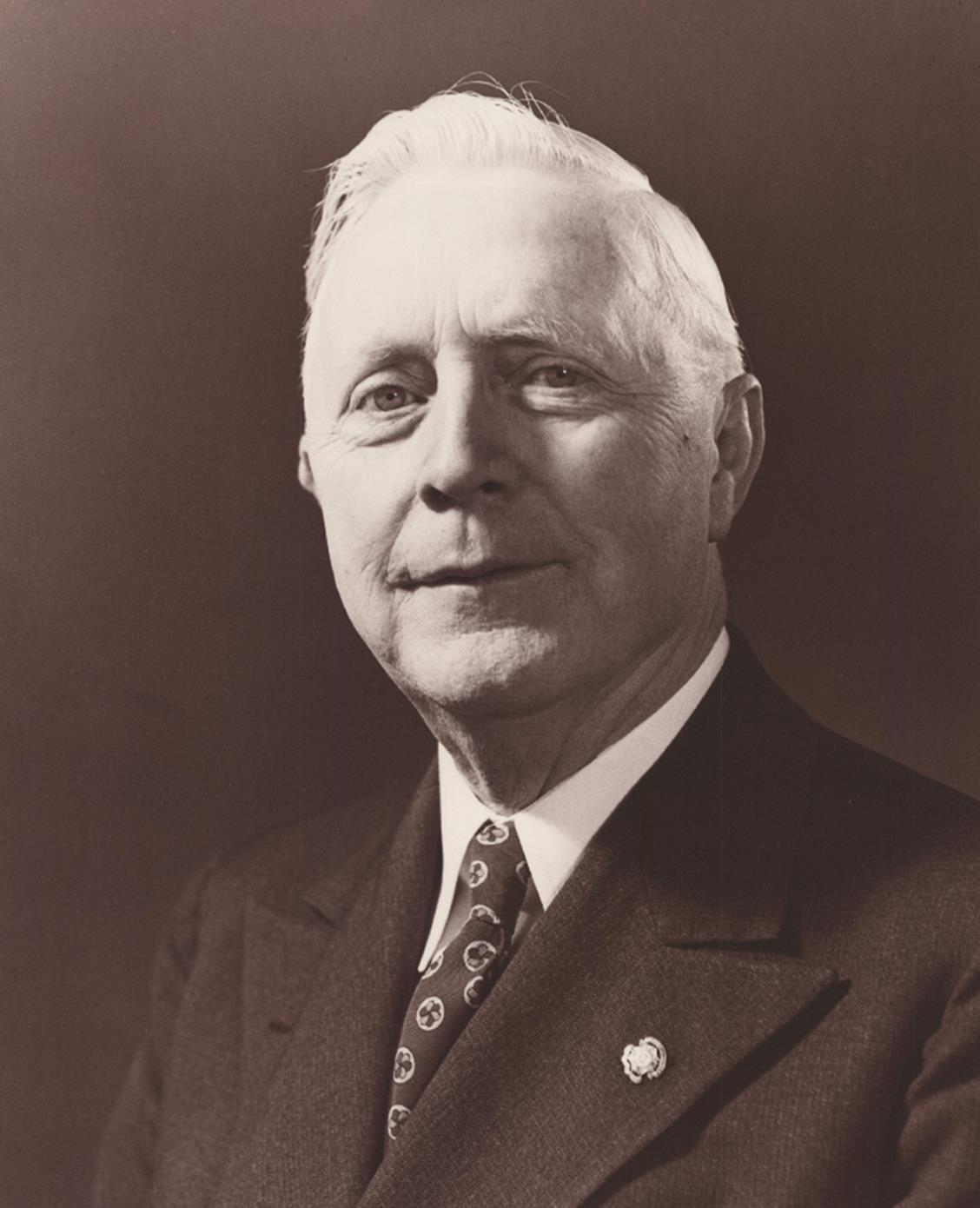

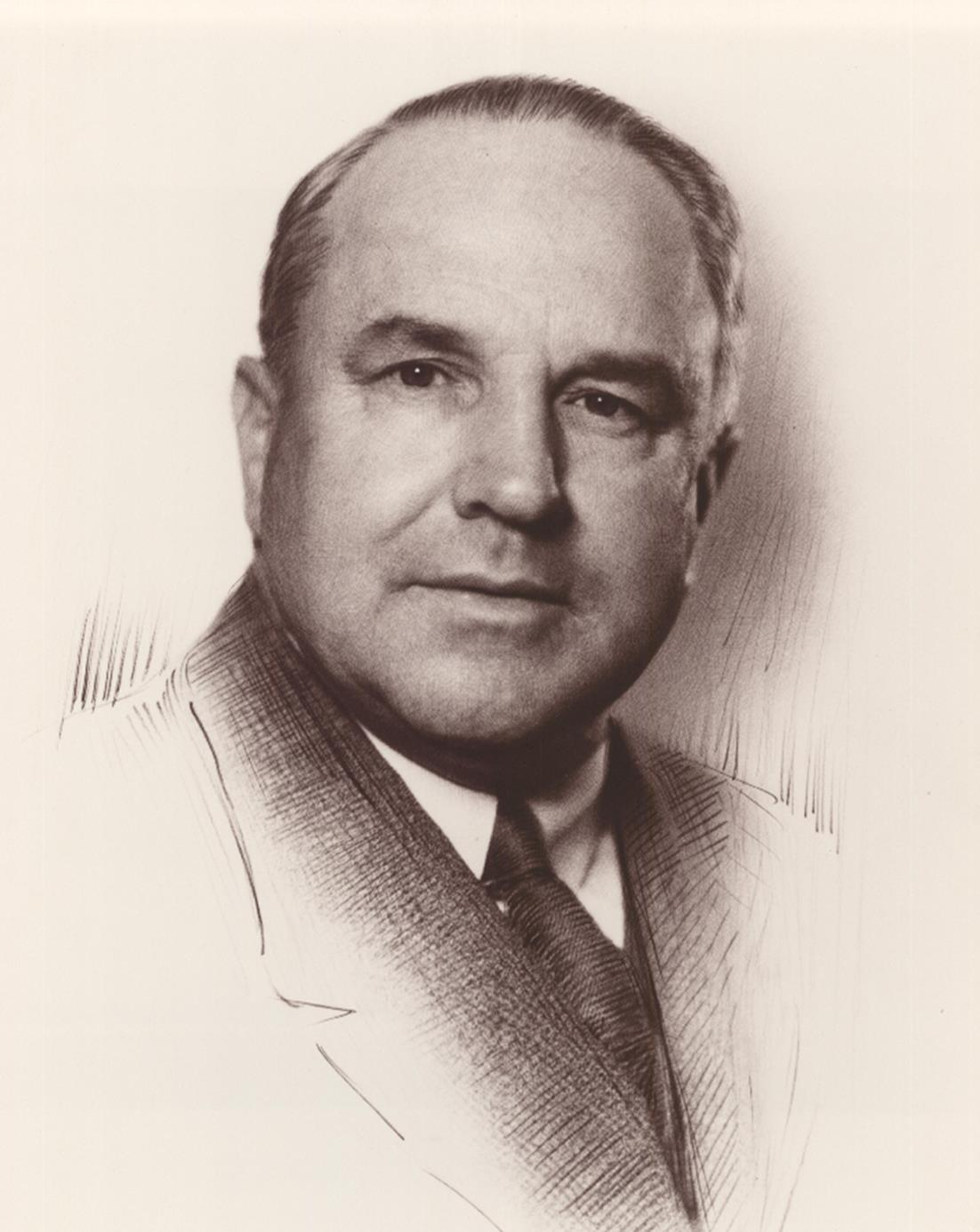
Nominee	Harry C. Clark	Percy J. Benbough
Party	Republican	Republican
Popular vote	17,147	10,836
Percentage	61.3%	38.7%
Mayor before election
John L. Bacon
Republican
Elected mayor
Harry C. Clark
Republican

The 1927 San Diego mayoral election was held on April 5, 1927 to elect the mayor for San Diego. Incumbent mayor John L. Bacon did not to stand for reelection. In the primary election, Harry C. Clark and Percy J. Benbough received the most votes and advanced to a runoff election. Clark was then elected mayor with a majority of the votes in the runoff.

== Candidates ==
- Harry C. Clark, attorney
- Percy J. Benbough, mortician
- George L. Mayne
- Claude L. Chambers
- Edgar F. Hastings
- Byron J. Walters
- William I. Kinsley
- Alfred L. Lee
- Oriel C. Jones

== Campaign ==
Incumbent Mayor John L. Bacon chose not to stand for reelection to a third term, leading to a large field of competitors to replace him. On March 22, 1927, Harry C. Clark came in first place in the primary election with 30.2 percent of the votes, followed by Percy J. Benbough with 17.0 percent. Since no candidate received a majority of the vote, Clark and Benbough advanced to a runoff election. On April 5, 1927, Clark received a majority of 61.3 percent of the vote in the runoff and was elected to the office of the mayor.

== Primary Election results ==
San Diego mayoral primary election, 1927
Party	Candidate	Votes	%
Republican	Harry C. Clark (incumbent)	7,933	30.2
Republican	Percy J. Benbough	4,469	17.0
Nonpartisan	George L. Mayne	4,197	16.0
Nonpartisan	Claude L. Chambers	3,647	13.9
Nonpartisan	Edgar F. Hastings	2,992	11.4
Nonpartisan	Byron J. Walters	2,664	10.1
Nonpartisan	Alfred L. Lee	313	0.1
Nonpartisan	William I. Kinsley	80	—
Nonpartisan	Oriel C. Jones	19	—
Total votes		26,314	100

== General Election results ==
San Diego mayoral general election, 1927
Party	Candidate	Votes	%
Republican	Harry C. Clark (incumbent)	17,147	61.3
Republican	Percy J. Benbough	10,836	38.7
Total votes		27,983	100
