= 1932 San Diego mayoral election =

- April 26, 1932
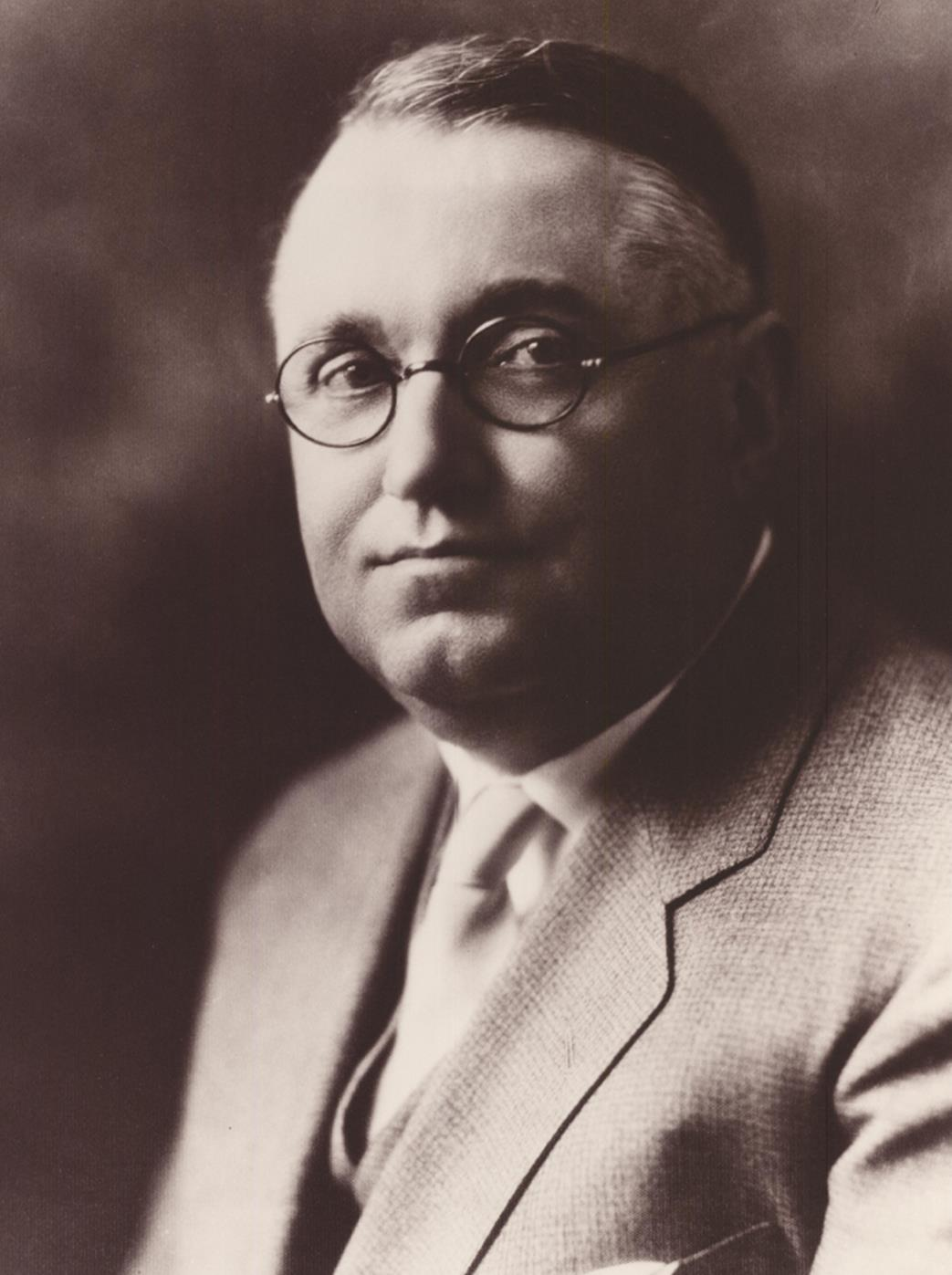

| Nominee | John F. Forward Jr. | William E. Harper |
| Party | Republican | Nonpartisan |
| Popular vote | 27,958 | 6,216 |
| Percentage | 81.8% | 18.2% |
Mayor before election
Walter W. Austin
Republican
Elected mayor
John F. Forward Jr.
Republican

The 1932 San Diego mayoral election was held on April 26, 1932, to elect the mayor for San Diego. Incumbent mayor Walter W. Austin did not stand for reelection. In the primary election, John F. Forward Jr. and William E. Harper received the most votes and advanced to a runoff election. Forward was then elected mayor with a majority of the votes in the runoff.

== Candidates ==
- John F. Forward Jr.
- William E. Harper
- James V. Alexander
- David L. Rosco
- Flemmer Adams
- C. Leon De Aryan
- Francis Von Hassler

== Campaign ==
Incumbent Mayor Walter W. Austin did not stand for reelection. On March 22, 1932, John F. Forward Jr. came in first in the primary election with 47.0 percent of the votes, followed by William E. Harper in second place with 20.9 percent. Since no candidate received a majority of the vote, Forward and Harper advanced to a runoff election. On April 26, 1932, Forward came in first place in the runoff election with 81.8 percent of the vote and was elected to the office of the mayor.

== Primary Election results ==
San Diego mayoral primary election, 1932
| Party | Candidate | Votes | % |
|---|---|---|---|
| Republican | John F. Forward Jr. | 16,726 | 47.0 |
| Nonpartisan | William E. Harper | 7,425 | 20.9 |
| Nonpartisan | James V. Alexander | 6,713 | 18.9 |
| Nonpartisan | David L. Rosco | 4,525 | 12.7 |
| Nonpartisan | Flemmer Adams | 200 | 0.6 |
| Nonpartisan | C. Leon De Aryan | — | — |
| Nonpartisan | Francis Von Hassler | — | — |
| Total votes | | 35,589 | 100 |

== General Election results ==
San Diego mayoral general election, 1932
| Party | Candidate | Votes | % |
|---|---|---|---|
| Republican | John F. Forward Jr. | 27,958 | 81.8 |
| Nonpartisan | William E. Harper | 6,216 | 18.2 |
| Total votes | | 34,174 | 100 |
