= 1939 San Diego mayoral election =

- April 25, 1939
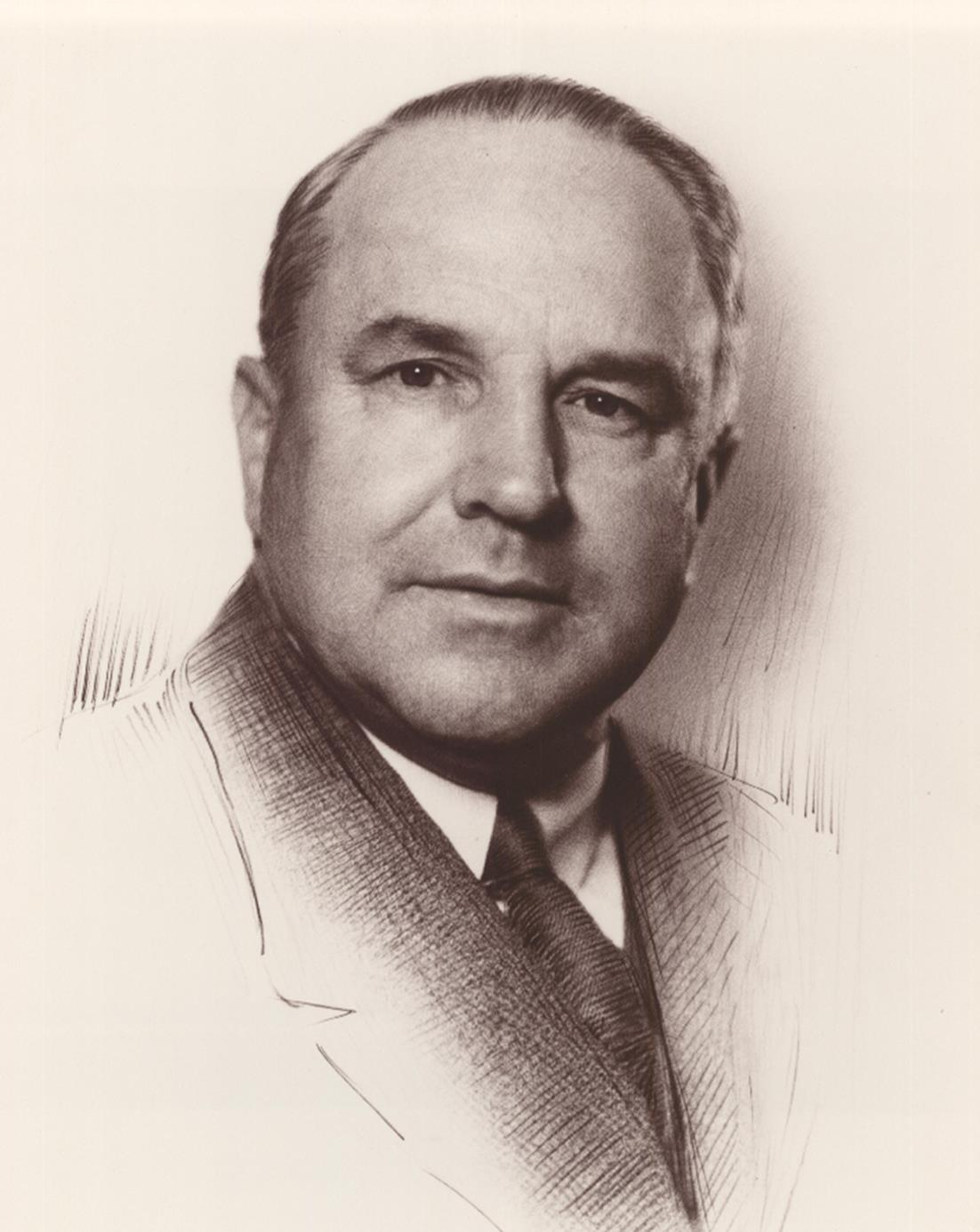

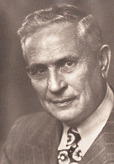
Nominee	Percy J. Benbough	Jacob Weinberger
Party	Republican	Democratic
Popular vote	32,196	9,113
Percentage	77.9%	22.1%
Mayor before election
Percy J. Benbough
Republican
Elected mayor
Percy J. Benbough
Republican

The 1939 San Diego mayoral election was held on April 25, to elect the mayor for San Diego. Incumbent mayor Percy J. Benbough stood for reelection to a second term. In the primary election, Percy J. Benbough and Jacob Weinberger received the most votes and advanced to a runoff election. Benbough was then reelected mayor with a majority of the votes in the runoff.

== Candidates ==
- Percy J. Benbough, mayor of San Diego
- Jacob Weinberger, attorney
- Magner White
- Claude Chandler

== Campaign ==
Incumbent Mayor Percy J. Benbough stood for reelection to a second term. Mayor Benbough had fallen out politically with the volunteer Civic Affairs Conference that had endorsed him in the previous election. Therefore, Benbough campaigned alongside a slate of city council candidates opposed to the conference's candidates, promising to "mow 'em down."

On March 28, 1939, Benbough came in first in the primary election with 57.9 percent of the votes, followed by Jacob Weinberger in second place with 24.3 percent. Because they had the two highest vote tallies, Benbough and Weinberger advanced to the runoff election. On April 25, 1939, Benbough came in first place in the runoff election with 77.9 percent of the vote and was reelected to the office of the mayor.

== Primary Election results ==
San Diego mayoral primary election, 1939
Party	Candidate	Votes	%
Republican	Percy J. Benbough (incumbent)	22,652	57.9
Democratic	Jacob Weinberger	9,707	24.4
Nonpartisan	Magner White	4,236	10.6
Nonpartisan	Claude Chandler	3,241	8.1
Total votes		39,836	100

== General Election results ==
San Diego mayoral general election, 1939
Party	Candidate	Votes	%
Republican	Percy J. Benbough (incumbent)	32,196	77.9
Democratic	Jacob Weinberger	9,113	22.1
Total votes		41,309	100
