= Charles Dail =

27th Mayor of San Diego (1909–1968)

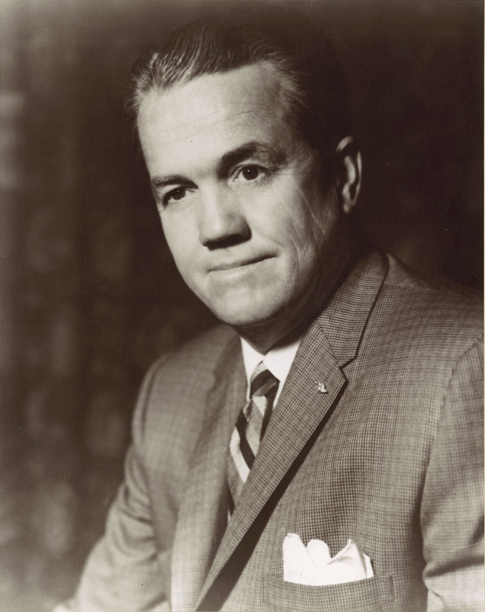

27th Mayor of San Diego
- In office May 2, 1955 – December 2, 1963
- Preceded by: John D. Butler
- Succeeded by: Frank E. Curran

Personal details
- Born: January 11, 1909 Kansas City, Kansas
- Died: July 13, 1968 (aged 59) San Diego, California
- Party: Democratic
- Spouse: Dorothy Mae Cook
- Profession: insurance

Charles Calhoun Dail (January 11, 1909 – July 13, 1968) was an American Democratic politician from San Diego, California. He served three terms on the San Diego City Council and two terms as the 27th mayor of San Diego.

== Biography ==
Charles Calhoun Dail was born on January 11, 1909, in Kansas City, Kansas. His parents were Charles Darwin Dail and Hester Dail, née Cooksey. He married Dorothy Mae Cook on June 28, 1933. Prior to seeking elected office, Dail worked in the insurance business.

== City Council and Mayor ==
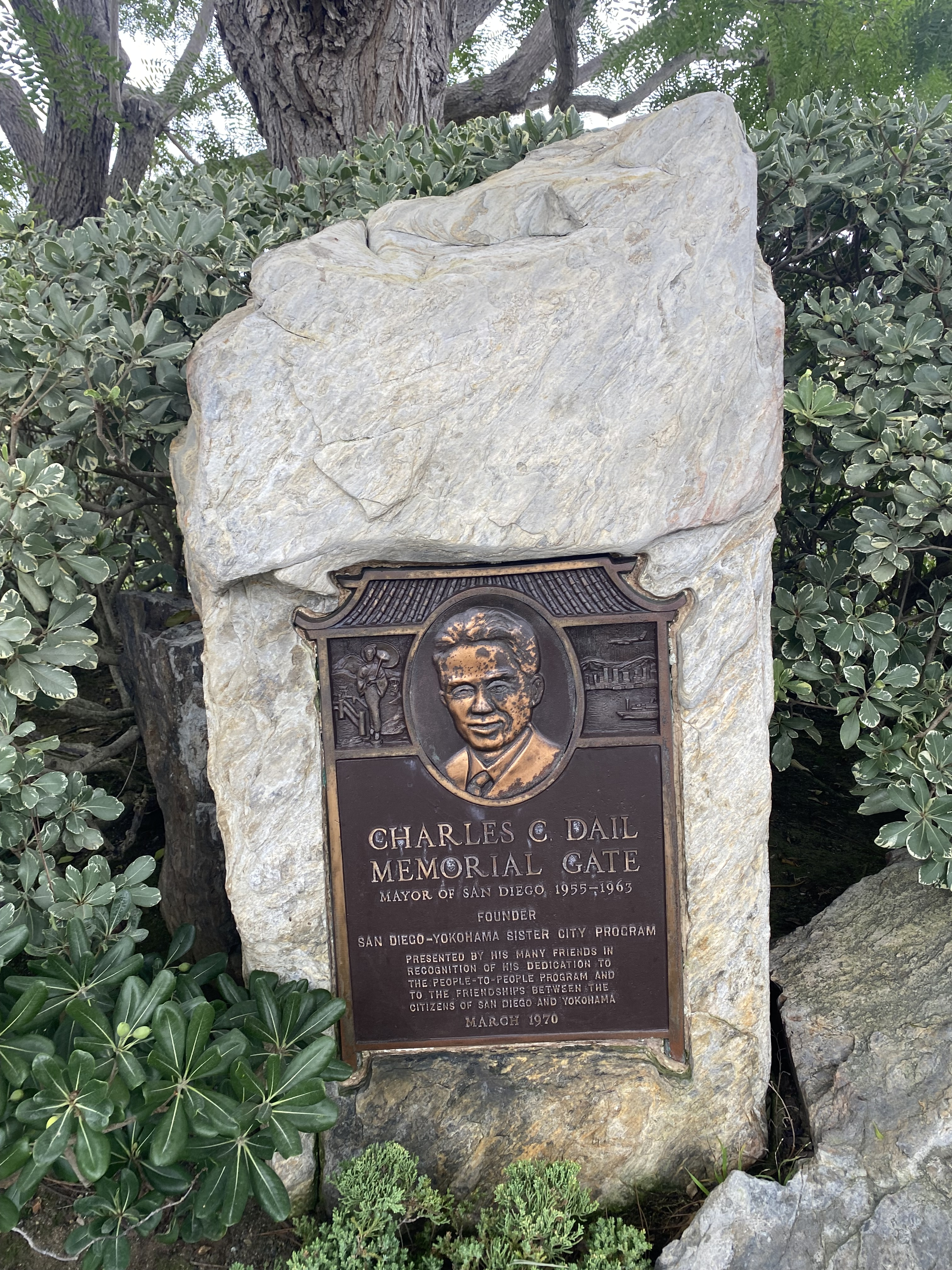
Plaque in Japanese Friendship Garden, Charles Dail Memorial

Dail was elected to three terms on the San Diego City Council from 1943 to 1955. Later he was twice elected mayor of San Diego, serving between 1955 and 1963.

As mayor he promoted the development of the downtown San Diego Community Concourse, which includes city hall and city offices as well as a civic auditorium; the project set off a wave of construction of skyscraper offices and hotels and started the revival of the city's downtown, which had been deteriorating. The city complex is now named the Charles C. Dail Community Concourse. He also spearheaded the development of Mission Bay Park.

Dail helped convince the Regents of the University of California to locate a new campus, the University of California, San Diego, in San Diego; ground was broken for the new campus in 1961. Dail had had polio as a child, and in 1963 he convinced Jonas Salk to locate the Salk Institute for Biological Studies in La Jolla, San Diego. The city donated 27 acres (11 hectares) of city pueblo land as a gift to construct the Institute.

Dail was also instrumental in establishing a sister-city relationship between San Diego and Yokohama, Japan. As a result, the Charles Dail Gate in the Japanese Friendship Garden in Balboa Park bears his name.

While Mayor, Dail was indicted by the Grand Jury twice. He was accused of offering to obtain a liquor license for a local bar owner in return for an interest in the business. Dail was ultimately successful in turning back these charges. Dail was also subject to recall effort led by a local organization called the Better Government Association. In their petition, they accused Dail of being unresponsive to the public on issues such as the elimination of parking meters, his advocacy for expanding Brown Field Municipal Airport into an international airport, and building new roads through Balboa Park. The recall campaign was ultimately unsuccessful.

Dail declined to run for a third term as mayor in 1963, citing personal and business reasons. At the time, Dail's combined twenty years serving as a city council member and mayor was the longest period of elected service in San Diego's history.

== Death ==
On July 13, 1968, Dail suffered a cerebral hemorrhage at his home in San Diego. He died soon after in Sharp Memorial Hospital at the age of 59. He was entombed at Greenwood Memorial Park.

Political offices
Preceded by John D. Butler	Mayor of San Diego, California; 1955—1963	Succeeded by Frank E. Curran
