= First Unitarian Universalist Church of San Diego =

Church in California, US

Coordinates: 32.7533378°N 117.1685776°W

First Unitarian Universalist
- First Unitarian Universalist Church of San Diego
- First Unitarian Universalist
- Location: 4190 Front St, San Diego, CA 92103
- Country: US
- Denomination: Unitarian Universalist Association of Congregations
- Website: www.firstuusandiego.org

History
- Founder(s): Alonzo Horton , Moses A. Luce
- Dedication: June 22, 1873

First Unitarian Universalist Church of San Diego is an independent congregation affiliated with the Unitarian Universalist Association of Congregations.

== Location ==
First Unitarian Church is located at 4190 Front St in San Diego in the Hillcrest neighborhood.

== Early history ==
Unitarians first met in San Diego in 1873 at Horton Hall.

== Notable Ministers ==
- Kathleen Owens
- Howard B. Bard served as mayor of San Diego, California, from 1942 to 1943.
