= Rutherford B. Irones =

American physician

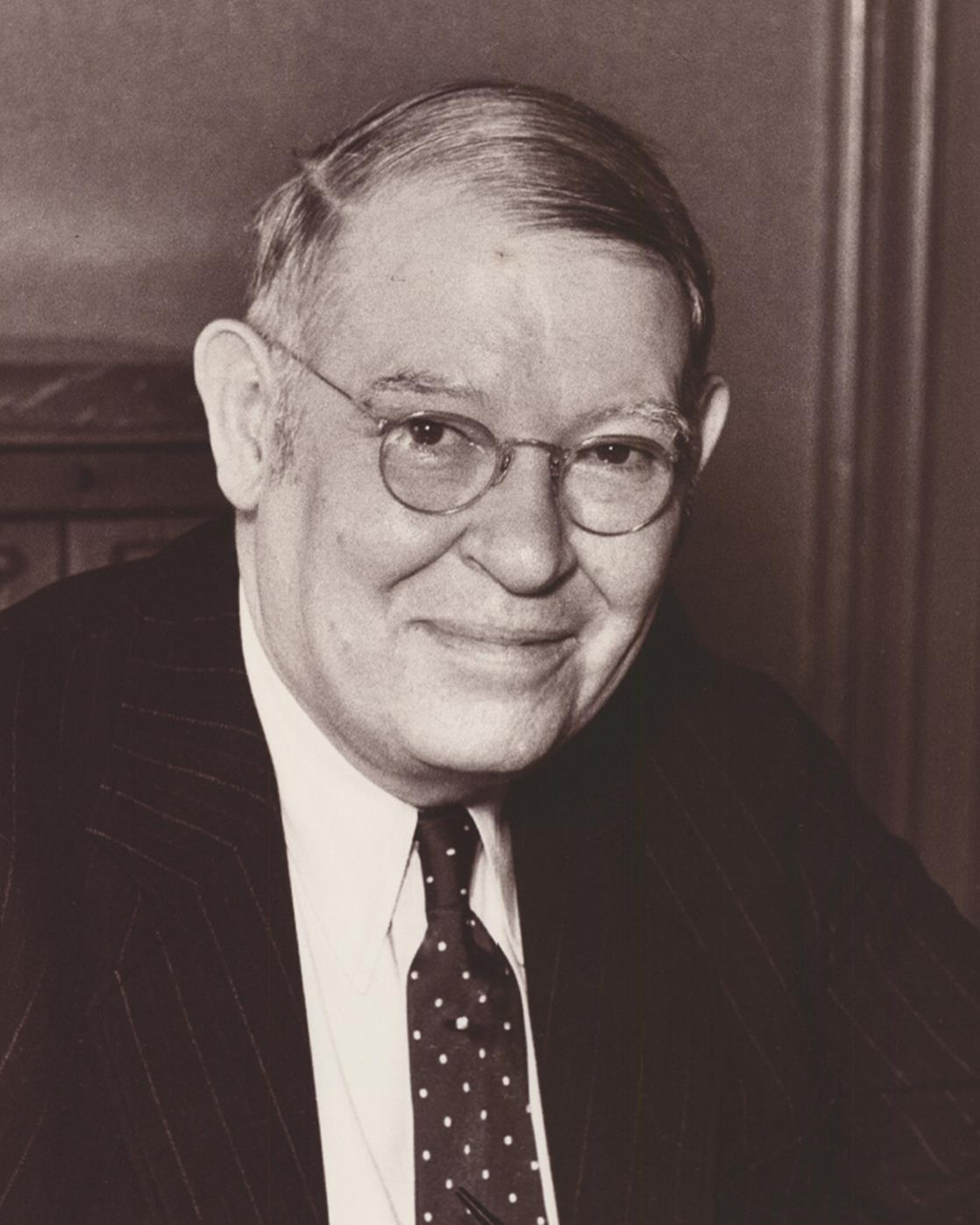

22nd Mayor of San Diego
- In office August 2, 1934 – February 1, 1935
- Preceded by: John F. Forward Jr.
- Succeeded by: Percy J. Benbough

Personal details
- Born: March 4, 1877 Oakland, California, U.S.
- Died: February 13, 1948 (aged 70) Sawtelle, California, U.S.
- Party: Republican

Rutherford B. Irones (March 4, 1877 – February 13, 1948) was an American physician and Republican politician from California.

== Early life: military and medical service ==
Irones was born March 4, 1877, in Oakland, California, to John H. Irones, who came to California in 1847. Rutherford Irones graduated from the University of California Medical School in Berkeley and trained as a physician at Vanderbilt Clinics at Roosevelt Hospital in New York. He joined the Marine Hospital Service in 1900 in San Francisco Bay and became a respected physician. He helped out with the San Francisco plague of 1900–1904. Later he went to La Boca, a neighborhood in the South American city of Buenos Aires, studying yellow fever, and visited several hospitals in Asia.

Irones married Georgie E. Dow in January 1906.

In 1907, Irones opened an office in San Diego where he practiced medicine.

During World War I, Irones served again as Captain in the medical corps, serving in France. At the war's end he remained and was food director for the American Relief Administration in Central Europe and Balkan States. He became friends with Alexander I, the crown prince of Yugoslavia. On January 17, 1920, Irones married the Countess von Retz and Sitzgross, later known as Essy, at Vienna, Austria. Irones returned to San Diego in 1920, where he was a member of the American Medical Association and local medical societies, and the Roman Catholic Church.

== Political life ==
Irones was a strong anti-prohibitionist and headed the Crusaders' anti-prohibition organization, which fought the 18th Amendment in the San Diego and Imperial counties. He campaigned in 1932 for Republican Tallant Tubbs against Democrat William Gibbs McAdoo for Senator. McAdoo, who was "dry", won.

Irones was appointed mayor of San Diego on August 2, 1934, to finish out the term of John Forward, who resigned. The council wanted to appoint Vice Mayor Al Bennett, but he said "I'm thoroughly disgusted with city politics. I don't want the mayor's appointment." Councilman Charles E. Anderson commented "I was in hope some outstanding citizen...could be persuaded to accept the office, but I guess that is impossible." He said the council settled on Irones as a "harmony" move.

Shortly after his appointment, Irones had his pay as mayor attached to pay a bad debt of $648 plus interest.

A month after taking office, he demanded and got a new Lincoln automobile from the city, which was derisively referred to by the press as the "royal coach". While driving drunk one evening, Irones crashed his new car, seriously injuring the passenger in the other car; then, he ran into a telephone pole trying to escape. Police Chief George M. Sears, appointed by Irones, did nothing.

Several months later, after a newspaper investigation and civil suit by the victim publicized the crime, Irones was arrested, convicted of hit-and-run driving, and forced to resign in 1935. Sentenced to six months in jail and one year's probation, he was confined in a cell with 17 others, but released 30 days early for good behavior. After a separate board hearing, Irones kept his medical license.

== Epilogue ==
In 1937 his wife Essy, the former Countess, sold her jewelry to pay his gambling debts and left him. He sued for divorce in 1939.

Irones died February 13, 1948, at the United States Veterans Home at Sawtelle, Los Angeles, where he had lived for a year prior to his death, and was buried in nearby Los Angeles National Cemetery.

== See also ==
- Black, Samuel T. (1913). San Diego County California. The S. J. Clark Publishing Company, Chicago., v. 2, pp. 263–264: "Rutherford B. Irones, M.D."
- Obituary, San Diego Union, February 17, 1948, p. A-3. Includes portrait

Political offices
Preceded by John F. Forward Jr.	Mayor of San Diego; 1934–1935	Succeeded by Percy J. Benbough
