= Howard B. Bard =

24th Mayor of San Diego (1870–1954)

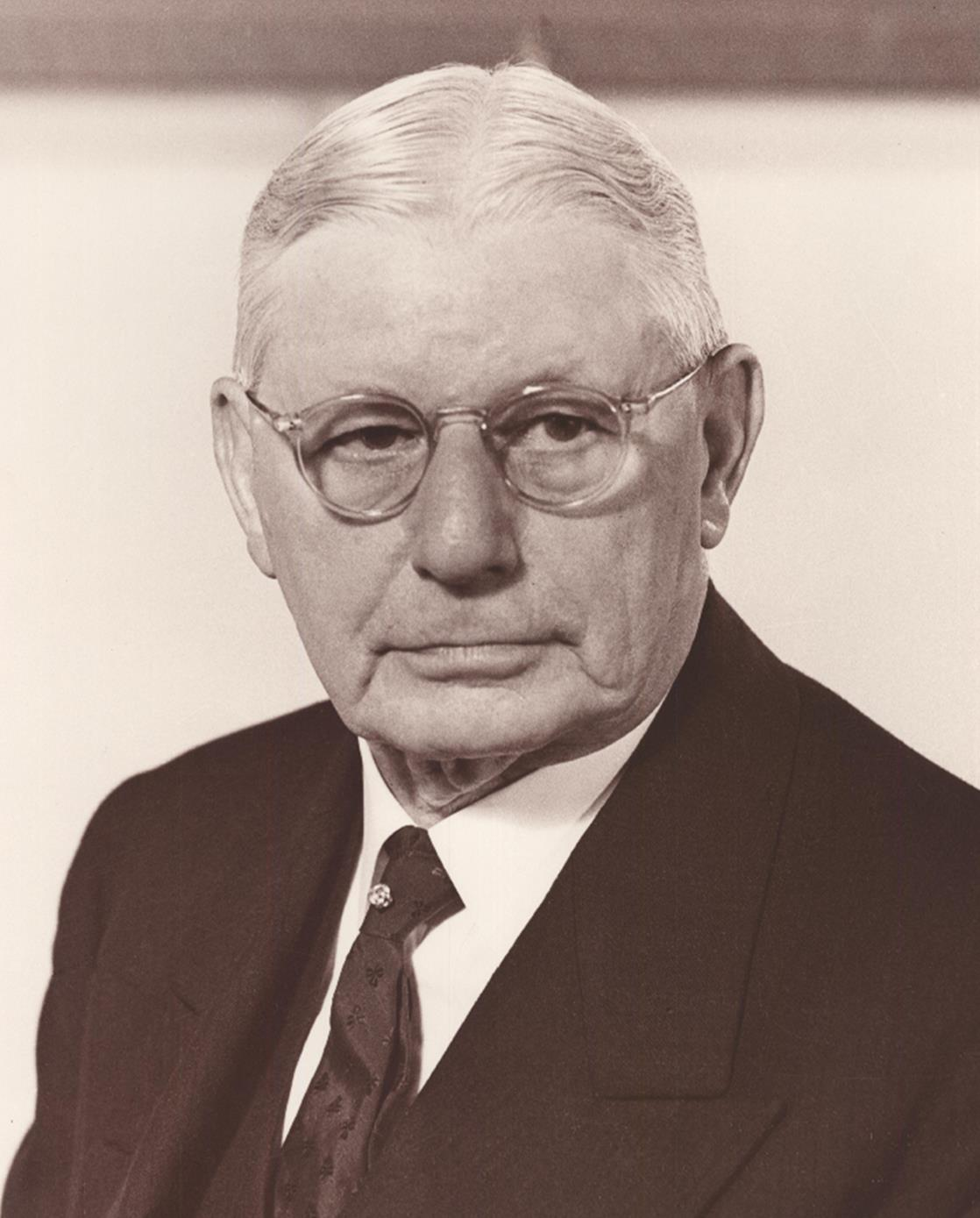

24th Mayor of San Diego
- In office November 4, 1942 – May 3, 1943
- Preceded by: Percy J. Benbough
- Succeeded by: Harley E. Knox

Personal details
- Born: October 20, 1870 Ohio
- Died: May 22, 1954 (aged 83) San Diego, California
- Party: Democratic

Howard Burton Bard (October 20, 1870 – May 22, 1954) was an American Unitarian minister and politician who served as mayor of San Diego from 1942 to 1943.

== Biography ==
Bard was born 1870 in Ohio. He was a pastor in Grand Rapids, Michigan. In 1912 Bard moved to San Diego, where he was pastor of the First Unitarian Church of San Diego for several decades. While pastor he continually organized public forums both at his church and later at his home to debate issues of the day. He did not shirk from controversy, scheduling debates on issues from capital punishment to peace with Germany.

Bard entered politics by being elected to the San Diego City Council in 1918. Politically, Bard was a Democrat. However, he vacated the office because he was out of the state for more than 30 days without authorized leave. Bard requested leave, but was denied by the City Council.

Bard was appointed mayor of San Diego on November 30, 1942 after Percy Benbough died in office, and finished out the term in 1943. Five days after taking office, he caused a furor when he fired his secretary, who worked for the city for eight years, and hired his daughter. A councilman called his appointment "a mistake".

After serving as "caretaker" mayor, Bard served in several other positions, including Commissioner of Public Works and City Parks Commissioner. Throughout his time as Pastor of the First Unitarian Church, San Diego City Councilman, Mayor and City Commissioner, Bard established a reputation as a lightning rod for a variety of the social, religious, civil and political issues of the era. During the late 1920s, 1930s and early 1940s Bard hosted a continual series of meetings, debates and forums at the First Unitarian Church and when the crowds grew too large to be comfortably accommodated there, on the canyon terraces behind his home in San Diego's Bankers Hill neighborhood. Hundreds of people turned out to hear debates on Prohibition, the rise of Nazism, American Isolationism, Government Corruption, the International Labor Movement, the Spanish Civil War and similar issues of the day. Bard sent invitations to many State and National leaders as well as citizens across San Diego to meet and argue virtually anything of note on the terraces of his Front Street home which he called “La Barranca Encantada” (The Enchanted Canyon).

In 1939 Bard married Mildred Valley Smith, daughter of William Henry Smith. They had at least one daughter and one son, Howard B. Bard, Jr.

Bard died 1954 in San Diego. Bard Hall at the First Unitarian Church was named in his honor in 1945.

== Quote ==
People who claim the right to free speech, to free assembly, to free press for themselves, come face to face with the situation of others claiming the same right of liberty—and because the other fellow's thought differs from his own, one often feels the other's right ought to be abridged or denied. . . . But, if we are to be good democrats in a democracy, we must be willing to allow to the other fellow the same rights of liberty that we demand for ourselves. That is especially true in religion.

== See also ==
- Biographical sketch, San Diego Union, January 2, 1943
- Obituary, San Diego Union, May 23, 1954

Political offices
Preceded by Percy J. Benbough	Mayor of San Diego, California; 1942–1943	Succeeded by Harley E. Knox
