= John D. Butler =

26th Mayor of San Diego (1915–2010)

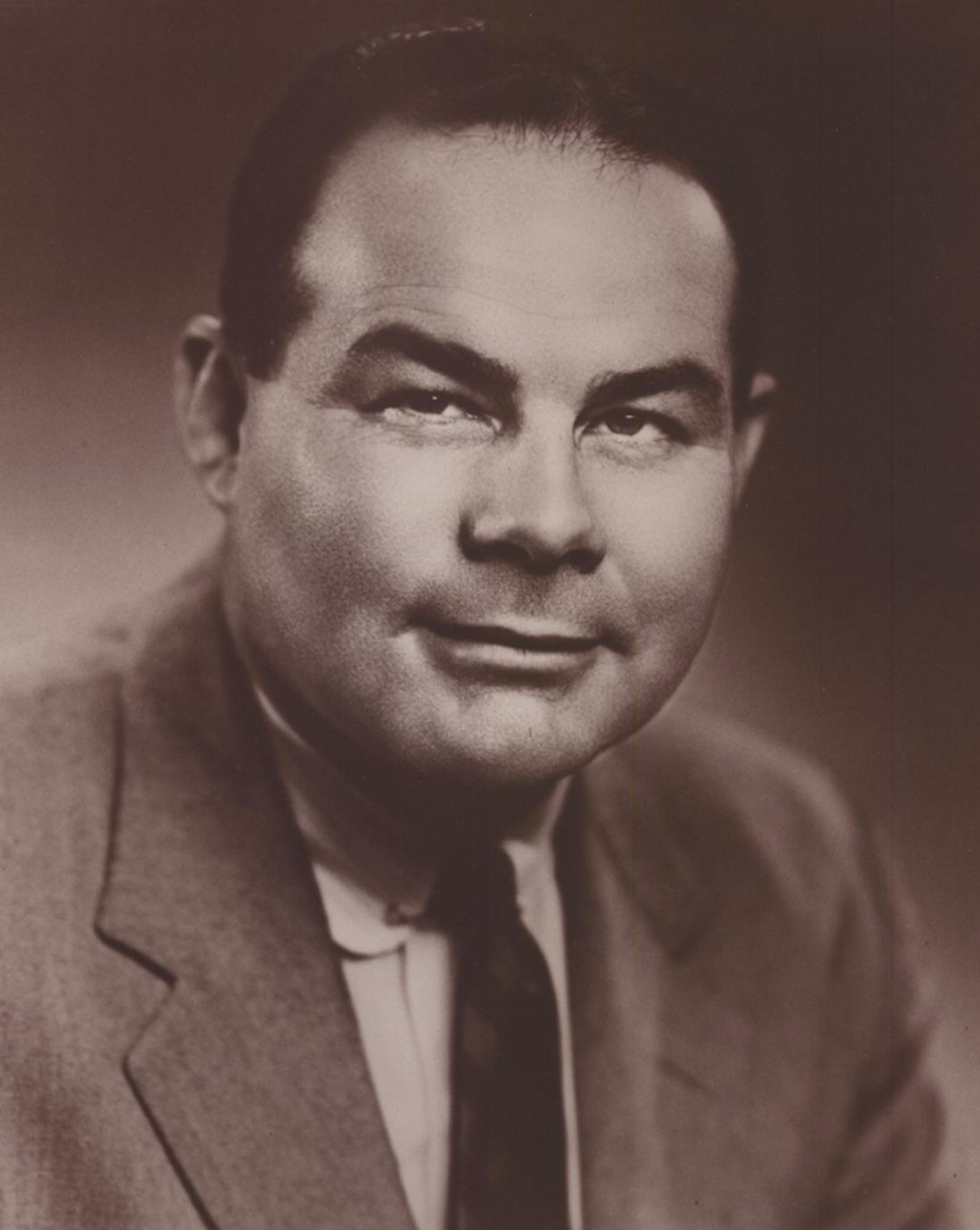

26th Mayor of San Diego
- In office May 7, 1951 – May 2, 1955
- Preceded by: Harley E. Knox
- Succeeded by: Charles Dail

Personal details
- Born: August 4, 1915 San Diego, California, U.S.
- Died: February 9, 2010 (aged 94) San Diego, California, U.S.
- Party: Republican
- Education: San Diego State College (B.A.); University of California, Berkeley; Stanford Law School (J.D.)

John D. Butler (August 4, 1915 – February 9, 2010) was an American Republican politician from California. John Butler was born in San Diego and played football at San Diego State University, where he was named an All-American. He was a transactional lawyer. During World War II, he served in the United States Navy.

Butler was mayor of San Diego, a nonpartisan position, from 1951 until 1955. He was the first "native son" mayor and the youngest mayor in city history. During his tenure as mayor, he was responsible for initiating the one-way street system in downtown San Diego and began the development of Mission Bay. He guest starred as himself on two CBS television series, the variety program, Faye Emerson's Wonderful Town, and What's My Line?. In the latter, a quiz program, broadcast on October 5, 1952, panelist Arlene Francis guessed Butler's identity. San Diego politics is the subject of an interview with Butler, which is included in the Oral History Collection of the San Diego Historical Society. Butler lived in the Point Loma area of San Diego during the last decades of his life and was active at San Diego Yacht Club and La Playa Yacht Club.

Political offices
Preceded by Harley E. Knox	Mayor of San Diego, California; 1951–1955	Succeeded by Charles Dail
