= Harley E. Knox =

American mayor (1899–1956)

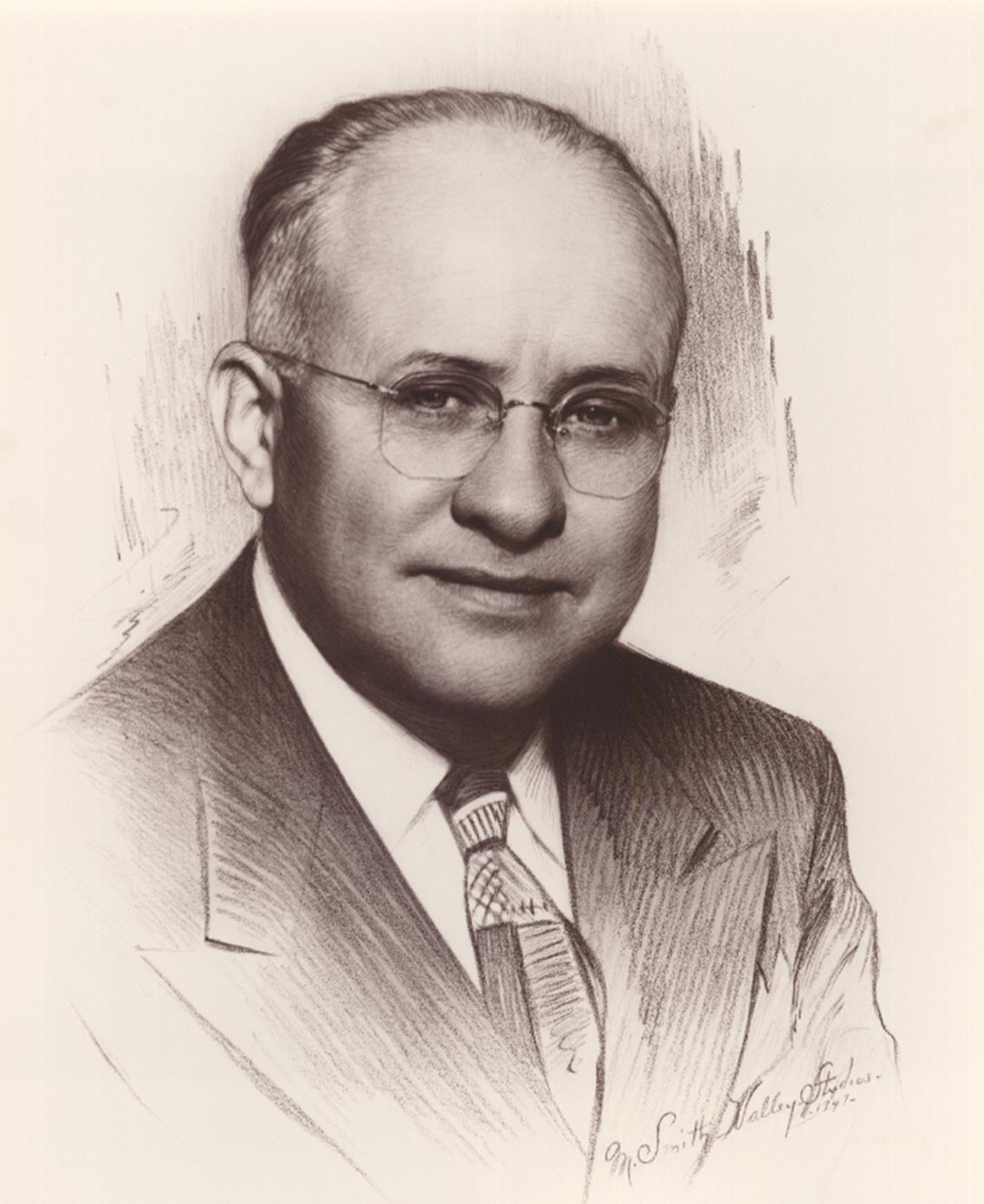

25th Mayor of San Diego
- In office May 3, 1943 – May 7, 1951
- Preceded by: Howard B. Bard
- Succeeded by: John D. Butler

Personal details
- Born: January 26, 1899 Nebraska
- Died: September 13, 1956 (aged 57) San Diego, California
- Party: Independent

Harley Eugene Knox (January 26, 1899 – September 13, 1956) was an American Independent politician from California.

== Biography ==
Born in 1899 in Nebraska, Knox came to San Diego with his parents in 1912. He dropped out of San Diego High School while a junior, and served briefly in the Army. He later graduated from the San Diego Normal School, which is now San Diego State University.

In 1919, he became a dairyman in southeastern San Diego when he bought his first cow. The same year, he married his next-door neighbor, Bessie, and they had four daughters.

Knox was first elected to city council in 1939, unopposed, and served until 1943. He was mayor of San Diego from 1943 until 1951. During his first mayoral campaign, on learning his opponent had raised $30,000 to defeat him, he commented: "If it was worth all that money for someone to make you mayor, I don't think they were preparing to buy good government."

While mayor, Knox was active in creating new public works projects for the city, such as expanding water and sewage facilities. He traveled frequently to Washington to lobby for federal aid. After World War II, San Diego faced a housing shortage, as did many U.S. cities. He came up with the novel idea of reusing surplus building material at the Army's Camp Callan (on the site now occupied by the University of California, San Diego) to build 1500 homes.

Knox also had a hand in expanding Lindbergh Field. To allow for an expanded airport, the city bought land for Montgomery Field and gained a 50-year lease for Naval Air Station Miramar. Unfortunately, the City Council terminated the Miramar lease a year after Knox left office and sold part of Montgomery Field for use by General Dynamics to manufacture missiles. Knox criticized his successors for being shortsighted.

During his term, he was responsible for constructing the San Diego Aqueduct, which joined the Metropolitan Water District's Colorado River Aqueduct. Although Knox was accused of promoting this project to benefit his dairy business, he became a local hero for winning the battle against the federal government over the San Diego's right to some of the Colorado River water. Knox also initiated planning for Mission Bay as a recreational area, and created Mission Bay Park with a bond issue.

Knox was injured in a plane crash in 1944 and subsequently suffered health problems, so declined to run for re-election in 1951. He returned to his dairy business, but remained active with various civic projects. He died of a heart attack in 1956, in San Diego.

His biographer, Iris Engstrand, said, "He's kind of like the last of the innocent mayors. He tried to do everything good for the city." American journalist John Gunther, who toured the United States to research his 1947 book Inside U.S.A., wrote of Knox, "...as well as anything I found in forty-eight states, he showed what a city can mean to its first citizen."

An elementary school in southeastern San Diego is named in his honor, and the Mission Hills-Hillcrest Branch of the San Diego Public Library is named after him and his wife.

== Quotes ==
… like a tropical hurricane the war effort swept over San Diego, tearing at its normal way of life, uprooting carefully laid plans, disrupting municipal services…. Now the gale has subsided. Around us is the wreckage and debris that must be swept up. [1946]

No encouragement should be given to both parents working and leaving the children in some institution. While it upgrades the standard of the family, it degrades the welfare of the child. [Arguing against day care in Aid to Dependent Children programs]

== See also ==
- Harley Eugene Knox: San Diego Mayor for the People 1943–1951 (2002) by Iris Engstrand and Paul Campuzano. ISBN 0-918740-23-1. Book reviewed by Roger Showley in The San Diego Union-Tribune, January 19, 2003, p. I-2. The book was underwritten by Knox's daughter Donna.

Political offices
Preceded by Howard B. Bard	Mayor of San Diego, California; 1943—1951	Succeeded by John D. Butler
