= John F. Forward Jr. =

American politician

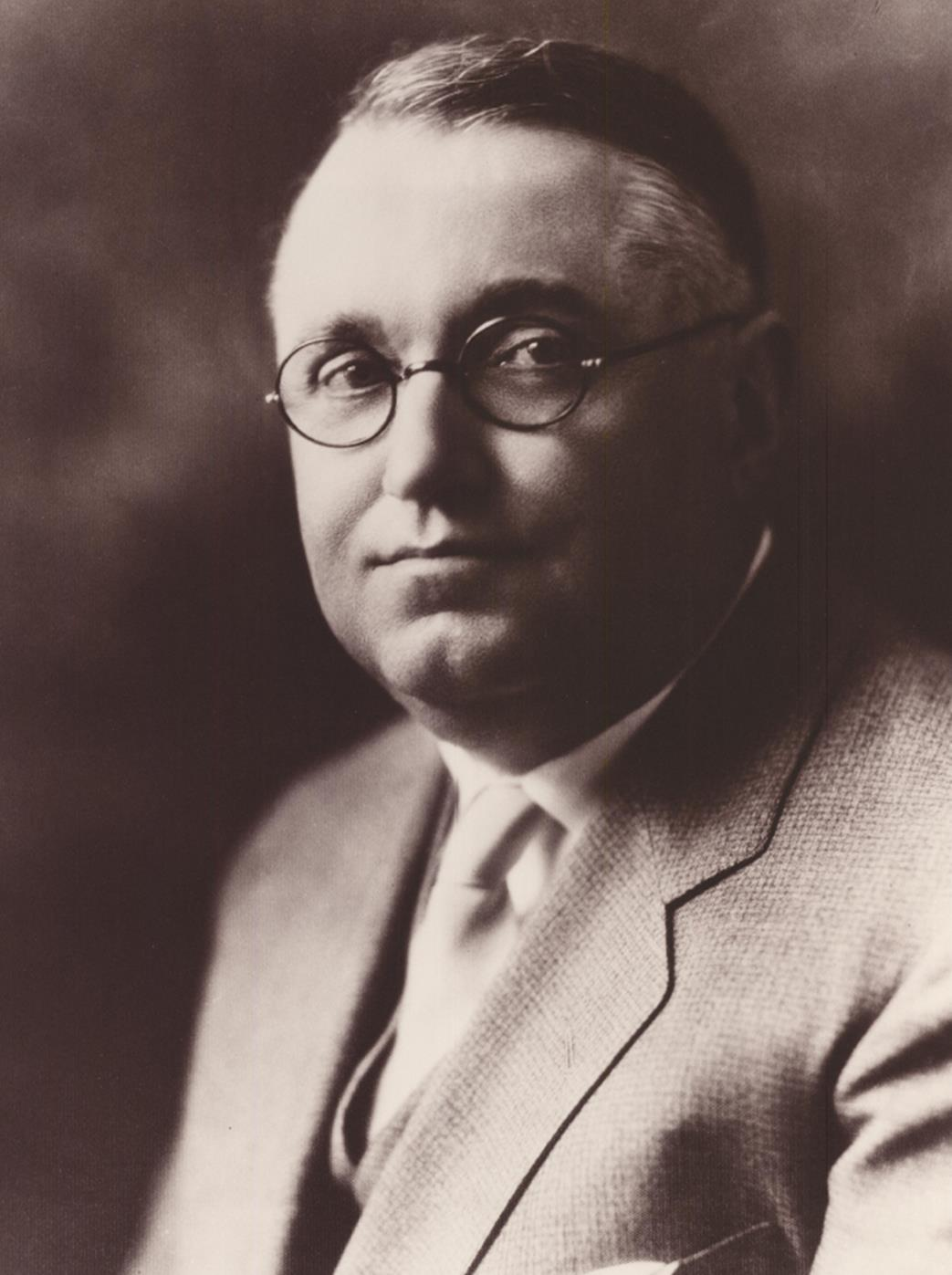

21st Mayor of San Diego
- In office May 2, 1932 – August 2, 1934
- Preceded by: Walter W. Austin
- Succeeded by: Rutherford B. Irones

Personal details
- Born: November 18, 1876 Pittsburgh, Pennsylvania, U.S.
- Died: March 28, 1938 (aged 61) San Diego, California, U.S.
- Party: Republican
- Spouse: Alberta Fairbanks
- Children: Flora

John F. Forward Jr. (November 18, 1876 – March 28, 1938) was an American businessman and politician from California.

== Personal and business life ==
John F. Forward Jr. was born 1876 in Pittsburgh, Pennsylvania, to John F. Forward Sr. and Elizabeth Forward. Forward came to San Diego, California, with his family in 1887, and graduated from the public schools.

In 1890, Forward started work in the title business with H. T. Christian & Company. In 1907, he started working for the Union Title and Trust Company of San Diego, founded by his father, and later became company president after his father's death in 1926. In the early 1930s he retired from the presidency, and became chairman of the board.

Forward was recognized as an expert on land titles and wrote an article on the "History of Land Titles in San Diego County", which appeared in Heilbron's History of San Diego County (1936).

Forward married Alberta Fairbanks July 29, 1901, and they had one daughter, Flora.

Forward died in 1938 in San Diego at age 61.

== Civic life ==
Forward served as president of the Chamber of Commerce in 1911. Forward served as a director of the 1915 Panama–California Exposition in San Diego and as city park commissioner until he resigned in 1926.

Forward was mayor of San Diego from 1932 until he resigned August 2, 1934. His father was also mayor two decades earlier, and they are the only father-son mayors for San Diego.

In 1936, Forward was active in promoting the California Pacific International Exposition.

== See also ==
- Black, Samuel T. (1913). San Diego County California. The S. J. Clark Publishing Company, Chicago., v. 2, pp. 539–540: "John F. Forward Jr."
- Heilbron, Carl (1936). History of San Diego County. San Diego Press Club. Biography, p. 24

Political offices
Preceded by Walter W. Austin	Mayor of San Diego; 1932–1934	Succeeded by Rutherford B. Irones
