= Percy J. Benbough =

23rd Mayor of San Diego (1984–1942)

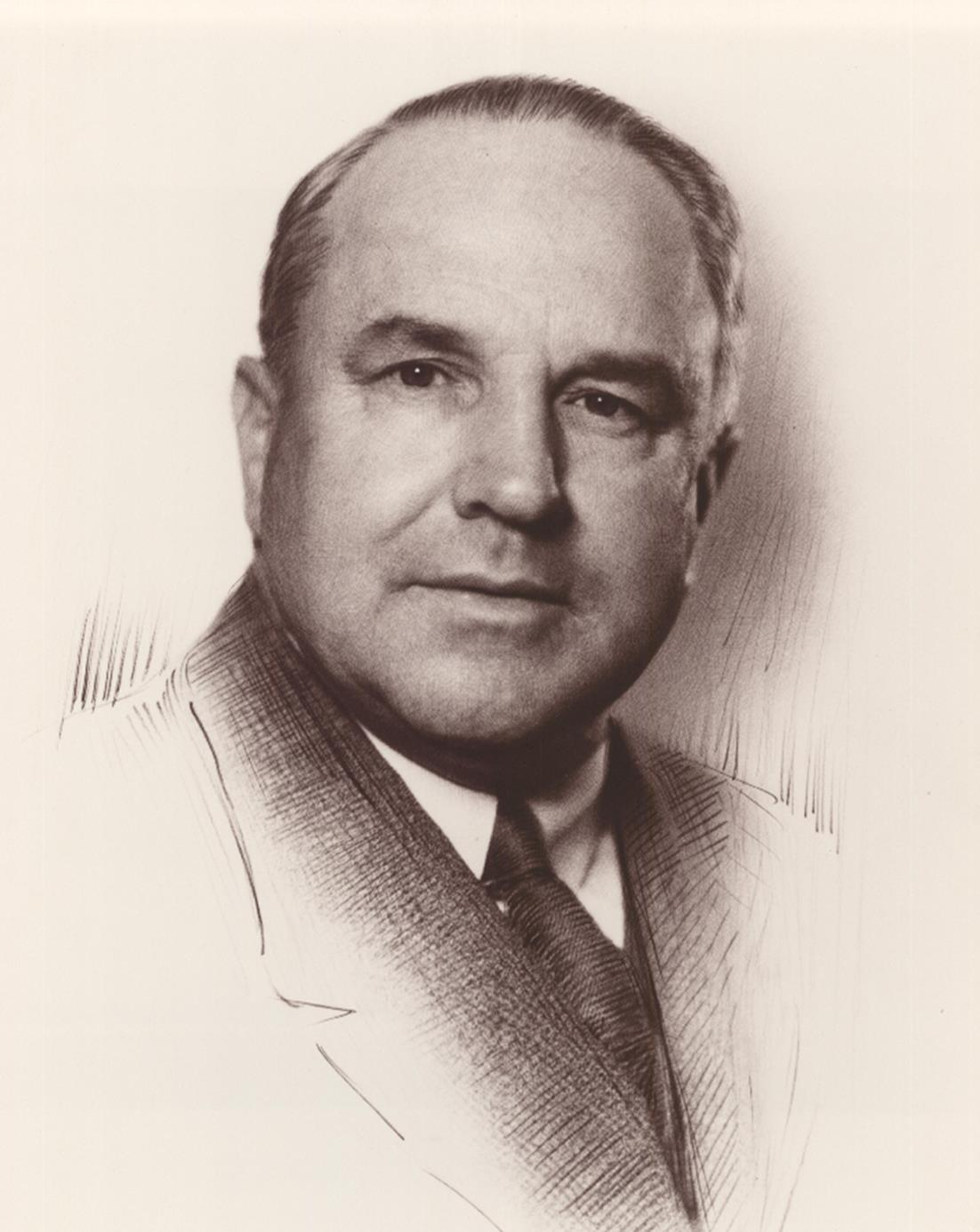

23rd Mayor of San Diego
- In office 6 May 1935 – 4 November 1942
- Preceded by: Rutherford B. Irones
- Succeeded by: Howard B. Bard

Personal details
- Born: 14 April 1884 London, United Kingdom
- Died: 4 November 1942 (aged 58) San Diego, California
- Party: Republican

Percival "Percy" James Benbough (14 April 1884 – 4 November 1942) was an American Republican politician from California.

Percy Benbough was born April 14, 1884 near London, England, and came to San Diego when he was four. At first he ran a grocery store and men's clothing store. His father was a mortician; after the elder Benbough died, Percy Benbough ran and expanded the business.

Benbough was elected councilman and served during 1913–1917, where he was also superintendent of the fire department. He ran for mayor of San Diego in 1927 but lost. In 1931 he was appointed police chief, where he transferred people to break up cliques to help fight corruption then existing in the department. After only three months as chief he resigned, due to frustration in removing entrenched corruption.

He was elected mayor in 1935 and reelected in 1939. One of his accomplishments as mayor was helping prepare the city for World War II.

Benbough died November 4, 1942, the only San Diego mayor to die in office. He is entombed at Cypress View Mausoleum.

He and his wife Grace Legler Benbough had two sons. She was born December 8, 1881, and died October 12, 1961, in San Diego. Their son Percy J., Jr., an avid sportsman, was killed in a plane crash on February 20, 1932 at age 25. Their other son, George Legler Benbough (1909-1998), a lieutenant commander in the U.S. Navy during World War II, took over the family's mortuary business in the 1930s and was usually known as "Legler."

The San Diego Historical Society's Percy Benbough Award for Distinction in Government Leadership honors Benbough. The Grace Benbough Room of Sharp Mary Birch Hospital in San Diego honors his wife, and was made possible by their younger son's legacy, the Legler Benbough Foundation.

== Quote ==
Don't let your money go to anyone who claims he can fix you at City Hall. We are going to get rid of the chiseler and the rat and we need your help. . . . If you insist on doing an illegal business—and mind you, I am not telling you it is all right—take your chances. . . . It will break you if you have to pay protection money and fines, too. [Speaking before the San Diego Liberal Businessman's Association, a group of saloonkeepers, bookmakers, and the like, on the eve of the 1935 California Pacific International Exposition.]

Political offices
Preceded by Rutherford B. Irones	Mayor of San Diego, California; 1935–1942	Succeeded by Howard B. Bard
