= Race and the war on drugs =

The war on drugs is a term for the actions taken and legislation enacted by the US federal government, intended to reduce or eliminate the production, distribution, and use of illicit drugs. The war on drugs began during the Nixon administration with the goal of reducing the supply of and demand for illegal drugs, but an ulterior racial motivation has been proposed. The war on drugs has led to controversial legislation and policies, including mandatory minimum penalties and stop-and-frisk searches, which have been suggested to be carried out disproportionately against minorities. The effects of the war on drugs are contentious, with some suggesting that it has created racial disparities in arrests, prosecutions, imprisonment, and rehabilitation. Others have criticized the methodology and the conclusions of such studies. In addition to disparities in enforcement, some claim that the collateral effects of the war on drugs have established forms of structural violence, especially for minority communities.

== Law and order politics ==
=== Origin ===
Several scholars, including the historian and lawyer Michelle Alexander, have stated that the war on drugs is one product of a political strategy known as "tough on crime." The emergence of the initiative in conservative politics can be traced to American campaigns in the mid-1950s. A 1966 U.S. News & World Report article covering Nixon's presidential campaign quoted him as saying that "the increasing crime rate can be traced directly to the spread of the corrosive doctrine that every citizen possesses an inherent right to decide for himself which laws to obey and when to disobey them." In the 1960s, as Nixon was making his first presidential run, crime rates began to rise dramatically in the United States. Street crime reportedly quadrupled, and homicide rates nearly doubled.

Alexander writes that while scholars now attribute the rising crime rates to the surge in population of the baby boomer generation, conservatives then tied the increases to race. Crime reports were used as evidence of a loss of morality and of social stability in the wake of the Civil Rights Movement. The 1964 Republican presidential candidate Barry Goldwater made the connection during his campaign and helped to lay the groundwork for the tough on crime movement. In a 1964 speech, "Peace through Strength," Goldwater said, "Choose the way of the Johnson Administration and you have the way of mobs in the streets." Lyndon Johnson's administration was responsible for passing the Civil Rights Act of 1964.

Alexander noted that Goldwater lost the presidential election, but his campaign strategy influenced that of Nixon's 1968 candidacy. Alexander stated that the politics of Nixon's campaign for president were coded anti-black rhetoric. Referring to the migration of black southerners to the north, Nixon said that "these cities were repaid with crime ridden slums and discontent." Nixon made 17 campaign speeches solely on law and order before the 1968 presidential election. The Republican strategist Kevin Phillips published his influential argumentative "The Emerging Republican Majority" in 1969 and wrote, "Nixon's successful presidential election campaign could point the way toward long term political realignment and the building of a new Republican majority, if Republicans continued to campaign primarily on the basis of racial issues, using coded antiblack rhetoric."

== Nixon administration ==
The war on drugs was declared by President Richard Nixon during a special message to Congress delivered on June 17, 1971, in response to increasing rates of death from narcotics. During his announcement, Nixon mentioned fighting the war on two fronts: the supply front and the demand front. To address the supply front, Nixon requested funding to train narcotics officers internationally and proposed various legislation to disrupt manufacturers of illegal drugs. The demand front referred to enforcement and rehabilitation; Nixon proposed the creation of the Special Action Office of Drug Abuse Prevention to co-ordinate various agencies in addressing demand for illegal drugs. The mission of President Nixon and the United States government was to use the war on drugs to emphasize law enforcement, reduce the supply of illicit drugs, arresting distributors, and attempting to prove a lesson to the people of America to stop using and selling drugs. Although, this drifted towards a focus on minorities. Prisons were filled with individuals arrested for nonviolent drug offenses, and most of the prisoners were a minority in the United States. He also requested an additional $155 million for treatment and rehabilitation programs and additional funding to increase the size and technological capability of the Bureau of Narcotics and Dangerous Drugs.

=== Controlled Substances Act ===
Nixon announced his first major federal policy relating to the issue of substance abuse in 1970. Known as the Controlled Substances Act (CSA), it was ratified into law on September 7, 1970 and marked one of his administration's first major policy achievements. The CSA regulated at a federal level the manufacture, distribution, use, and distribution of certain substances. It placed all controlled substances into one of five scheduled classes based on their potential for abuse and ability to be used in medical treatment. One feature of the Act was the establishment of the National Commission on Marijuana and Drug Abuse, also known as the Shafer Commission, which was chaired by former Pennsylvania Governor Richard Shafer. Its purpose was to understand the extent of use of marijuana in the United States. The commission found that marijuana was undeserving to be classified as Schedule 1, the most dangerous classification, which included heroin and cocaine. In addition, the committee urged the administration to consider the potential of legalization laws in relation to marijuana.

The drug historian, writer, and researcher Emily Dufton attests to Nixon's disdain for marijuana and his personal convictions of a connection between the drug and social rot. In addition, she argues that Nixon viewed marijuana as a "black drug" and that pursuing a punitive attitude towards the drug could offer significant political gain. Dufton states that the administration directly ignored the report from the Shafer Commission because of Nixon's personal feelings towards the drug. Nixon told Shafer in a private meeting, "I have very strong feelings about marijuana." He continued, "I want a goddamn strong statement against the drug. One that just tears the ass out of legalization supporters." Marijuana's psychoactive chemical, tetrahydrocannabinol (THC), is still listed as a Schedule 1 drug, despite its legalization in several states. Scholars of criminal justice and drug policy like Antony Loewenstein and James Forman Jr. argued that the CSA was not punitive in nature but targeted marijuana in a demonizing and criminal way. Their argument was based on a belief that targeting marijuana was part of a larger anti-black political strategy. Both intellectuals argue that marijuana was purposefully aligned by conservative politicians with an urban black population, civil rights protests, and the rising crime rates of the late 1960s and the early 1970s. The argument concludes that the political strategy led to disproportionate punitive treatment of the black communities' usage of marijuana.

=== Increases in federal funding ===
On June 17, 1971, Nixon held a press conference in which he announced, "America's public enemy number one in the United States is drug abuse." He continued, "In order to fight and defeat this enemy, it is necessary to wage a new, all-out offensive." In the speech, Nixon called for Congress to approve the allocation of $150 million in new funding to the "treatment and prevention of drug abuse." According to the Bureau of Labor Statistics, that is now the equivalent of just under $966 million.

=== Heroin epidemic ===
During the Nixon administration, the country faced a heroin epidemic. There were 15 times as many heroin addicts in Washington, D.C., as there were in all of England. The US government responded in two ways. The first response came from Nixon's newly appointed Special Action Office for Drug Abuse Prevention, headed by Jerome Jaffe to provide free synthetic alternatives to heroin in the form of government-regulated methadone. The idea was not to cure the addicts but to prevent them from engaging in street crimes to feed their addictions. The second response came in the form of an increased police presence. Some community activists criticized the Nixon treatment program, many of whom saw heroin addiction and methadone treatment as a new form of black oppression. There was a call from black community leaders for more punitive action against dealers and users. Black activists in Chicago, DC, and Harlem called on government to increase the policing and the sentencing for individuals involved in robbery, mugging, street dealing and murder. Many civil rights advocates pushed back against the law and order rhetoric that won Nixon the White House, but other activists from some of the most drug-affected cities were some of the earliest supporters of more punitive drug policies. Scholars argue that conservative politicians used the calls from the nation's urban leaders as proof that the law and order policies had nothing to do with race. Many historians, including Foreman Jr. and Alexander write that knowingly or unknowingly, black politicians helped the formation of the American penal system, which would grow to operate at levels unprecedented in world history.

=== Creation of Drug Enforcement Agency ===
In 1973, Nixon created the Drug Enforcement Agency (DEA) to bring together the Bureau of Dangerous Drugs and the US Customs Agency. According to the DEA's own historical record, the goal of the merger was to end the rivalry and the miscommunication between the offices in an attempt to combat the rising availability and use of drugs in the US.

Upon its creation, the DEA received a $1 billion increase in federal funding over what the two agencies had been receiving prior to the merger. From 1973, before the merger, to 1974, federal budgeting for drug enforcement rose $41 billion and would increase again in 1975 from $116.20 billion to $140.90 billion.

=== Rockefeller Mandatory Minimum Drug Laws ===
In 1973, New York Governor Nelson Rockefeller passed the nation's first mandatory minimum drug laws. Increasing pressure from the failed treatment programs in New York's most drug-addicted cities, Rockefeller introduced mandatory minimum drug laws. Rockefeller, according to New York District Attorney Arthur Rosenblatt, had been a champion of rehabilitation treatment methods as governor but now felt that those policies were failing, turned to the "tough on crime" ideas of Nixon, and introduced the new laws to his state. The laws called for mandatory prison sentences of 15 years to life for drug dealers. Rosenblatt testified that addict or casual users, or anyone else found in possession of even trace amounts of marijuana, cocaine, or heroin were eligible for a prison sentence and that almost immediately, there was a disproportionate rate of arrest and incarceration in urban and minority neighborhoods. Whites were using and selling drugs at similar rates to blacks, but minorities disproportionately went to prison. Rockefeller would become vice president under President Gerald Ford after the resignation of Nixon.

=== Ehrlichman interview ===
A former Nixon aide suggested that the war on drugs was racially and politically motivated.

The Nixon campaign in 1968, and the Nixon White House after that, had two enemies: the antiwar left and black people. You understand what I'm saying? We knew we couldn't make it illegal to be either against the war or black, but by getting the public to associate the hippies with marijuana and blacks with heroin, and then criminalizing both heavily, we could disrupt those communities. We could arrest their leaders, raid their homes, break up their meetings, and vilify them night after night on the evening news. Did we know we were lying about the drugs? Of course we did.

— John Ehrlichman, former Nixon aide, interview with Dan Baum

However, because he may have been disillusioned with the Nixon administration following the Watergate scandal, the validity of Ehrlichman's claim has been disputed.

== Carter administration ==
=== Marijuana legalization ===
President Jimmy Carter was an advocate for legalization of marijuana at the national level. Carter argued that possession of less than 28 g of marijuana should be decriminalized. Carter believed in a more treatment-based approach to the addiction problems, with softer penalties for cocaine but was as opposed to heroin as his predecessors. In a speech to Congress in 1977, Carter stated that "penalties against possession of a drug should not be more damaging to an individual than the use of the drug itself."

Rather than legalization, congressional lawmakers passed a bill that would criminalize only marijuana "open to public view." Scholars would later criticize the abuse of that bill when they debated stop-and-frisk laws.

In 1967, the US Supreme Court ruled in Terry v. Ohio that a "stop-and-frisk" search does not violate the Fourth Amendment if the officer executing the search bears a "reasonable suspicion" that the person being searched has committed or is about to commit a crime. As a result, "stop-and-frisk" searches became much more common during the war on drugs and were generally conducted in minority communities. "Stop-and-frisk" searches have been criticized for being disproportionately carried out against minorities as a result of racial bias, but empirical literature on that count is inconclusive. Certain authors have found that even after controlling for location and crime participation rates, blacks and Hispanics are stopped more frequently than whites. Others have found that no bias exists on average in an officer's decision to stop a citizen, but bias may exist in an officer's decision to frisk a citizen.

Carter oversaw the largest scale back of incarceration in US history. He presided over a 34% decline in sentenced prisoners between 1977 and 1980, a reduction of 9,625 inmates. That was the largest of any president on record, both as a percentage and in absolute numbers.

== Reagan administration ==
President Ronald Reagan officially announced his war on drugs in October 1982. Reagan began to shift the job of drug enforcement from the state to the federal level. Reagan greatly increased the budgets of the antidrug programs in the FBI, the DEA, and the Department of Defense.

=== African American representation in the media ===
Crack cocaine hit the streets of the United States in 1985. A decline in legitimate inner-city employment opportunities led some to sell drugs, most notably crack. The unsettled and developing crack markets created a wave of violence in many neighborhoods of the United States. The DEA began lobbying congress on behalf of Reagan's war on drugs initiative by courting media outlets in an attempt to win public support for the war on drugs. Robert Strutman, head of the New York City DEA office recalled, "In order to convince Washington, I needed to make drugs a national issue and quickly. I began lobbying efforts and I used the media. The media was only too willing to cooperate."

In June 1986, Newsweek called crack the biggest story since the Vietnam War and Watergate, and in August, Time termed crack "the issue of the year." Stories written about crack featured terms like "welfare queen," "crack babies" and "gangbangers," racially targeted terms. "Welfare queen" and "Predator criminals" were among the most frequently used terms, which had been coined by Reagan during his presidential campaign. The sociologists Craig Reinerman and Harry Levine stated, "Crack was a godsend to the right.... It could not have appeared at a more politically opportune moment."

=== Military Cooperation with Law Enforcement Act ===
The Military Cooperation with Law Enforcement Act, passed in 1981 allowed the military to provide local, state, and federal police access to military bases, weapons, intelligence, and research in the name of drug intervention. The Act rescinded much of the power of the Comitatus Act, passed after the Reconstruction period, which prevented the use of the military in local police efforts without the consent of Congress. Police departments would receive disbursements based on the number of antidrug arrests the department made. Non-drug arrests brought no financial gain, even for violent crime.

=== Comprehensive Drug Abuse and Control Act ===
The original act, passed in 1970, allowed governments to attain funds, drugs, and equipment seized during raids through civil court hearings and drug convictions. Over the years, the list of items allowed to be seized grew in size. In 1984, the Act was amended to allow federal law enforcement agencies to "retain and use any and all proceeds from asset forfeitures, and to allow state and local police agencies to retain up to 80 percent of the assets value." The law now allowed police units to seize cars, cash, and property from drug raids, even without a conviction. "Because those who were targeted were typically poor or of moderate means, they often lacked resources to hire an attorney or pay the considerable court costs. As a result, most people who had their property seized did not challenge the government's action, especially because the government could retaliate by filing criminal charges."

Between 1989 and 1992, federally funded state and local police agencies seized over $1 billion in assets. That did not include the DEA or other federally funded enforcement agencies.

=== Anti-Drug Abuse Act ===
Spurred by the media craze over the war on drugs the House of Representatives allocated $2 billion in new funding to the federal anti-drug fight in 1986. The House also authorized the use of the military in narcotics control efforts, the death penalty for some drug related crimes, and the admission of illegally obtained evidence in drug trials.

In October 1986, Reagan signed the Anti-Drug Abuse Act. It supported much-harsher federal penalties than any other drug legislation in the United States ever passed, with mandatory minimum sentences for the distribution of cocaine and far more severe punishments for the distribution of crack. It outlined a 100-1 discrepancy in prison terms for crack versus powder cocaine. An individual caught with 5 g of crack cocaine would face a five-year sentence. An individual would need to be caught with 500 g of powder cocaine to carry the same sentence. Many scholars have argued that these laws were racist in nature since crack was a drug identified by the media and the public to be associated with black America and powder cocaine with white America. In addition, scholars have pointed out that data from states like New York, where mandatory minimum sentencing had originated a decade earlier, show that mandatory minimums lead to a disproportionate number of arrests of black Americans. The Act was revisited by the administration in 1988 to allow public housing authorities to evict a tenant who allowed drug-related activity to occur on or near public housing premises. Also was added a five-year minimum mandatory sentence for anyone found in possession of cocaine base, even without evidence of intent to distribute. The penalties applied to citizens even without prior convictions.

The vote passed 346–11. Six of the negative votes came from the Congressional Black Caucus.

=== "The Dark Alliance" ===
In 1996, the journalist Gary Webb published a series of articles for the San Jose Mercury News tying the Reagan administration to the trafficking of illegal narcotics into the United States. The three-part expose by Webb, "The Dark Alliance," claimed that in an effort to support the Sandinista National Liberation Front (FDN) financially, the CIA supported narcotics trafficking into the US by top members of the Nicaraguan rebel group, the Contras. Webb alleged that the fallout from the operation was the large scale spread of the crack epidemic in the United States. A California-based drug dealer, "Freeway," Rick Ross testified that Norwin Meneses and Danillo Blandon Reyes, two members of the FDN, supplied him with cocaine for much of the 1980s. He testified that at its peak, the drug ring operated from California to Michigan and as far south as Louisiana. The State Department knew of the operation and interfered with local police investigation to prevent the prosecution of FDN-linked trafficking. In 1990 Reyes testified that his "cocaine sales were for a time C.I.A. approved." Blandón testified that the CIA notified him of a raid on his home in 1986. Neither Meneses or Blandón ever received prison sentences for their roles in the scandal.

The response to Webb's writings were mixed. Journalists from both The Washington Post and The Los Angeles Times credited Webb with an important piece of journalism. David Corn of The Washington Post wrote that Webb "deserves credit for pursuing an important piece of recent history and forcing the C.I.A. and the Justice Department to investigate the contra-drug connection." Other journalists, including James Adams of The New York Times, were critical of Webb's work with his sources. Adams denounced Webb for his failure to contact the CIA and "cross check sources and allegations" and concluded, "For investigative reporters determined to uncover the truth, procedures like these are unacceptable."

The series resulted in three federal investigations (by the CIA, the Department of Justice, and the House Intelligence Committee) into the claims of "Dark Alliance." The reports rejected his main claims but were critical of some CIA and law enforcement actions. The CIA report found no evidence that "any past or present employee of CIA, or anyone acting on behalf of CIA, had any direct or indirect dealing" with Ross, Blandón, or Meneses or that any of the other figures mentioned in "Dark Alliance" were ever employed by or associated with or contacted by the agency. The Department of Justice report stated that "We did not find that he [Blandón] had any ties to the CIA, that the CIA intervened in his case in any way, or that any connections to the Contras affected his treatment." The House Committee report examined the support that Meneses and Blandón gave to the local Contra organization in San Francisco and the Contras in general and concluded that it was "not sufficient to finance the organization" and did not consist of "millions," contrary to the claims of the "Dark Alliance" series. The support "was not directed by anyone within the Contra movement who had an association with the CIA," and the committee found "no evidence that the CIA or the Intelligence Community was aware of these individuals' support."

== George H.W. Bush administration ==
In August 1989, during his first year in office, President George H. W. Bush announced that drugs were "the most pressing issue facing our nation." During the speech, Bush held up a bag of crack into the camera as he blamed "everyone using drugs" to be "the greatest threat to America." A New York Times/CBS News poll that year reported that 64% of those polled, the highest ever recorded, saw drugs as the most dangerous issue facing the nation. As recently as 1982, a poll on a similar issue recorded that just 2% of the nation saw drugs as the most pressing issue. Some scholars attribute the rise in public sentiment to an increase in drug activity. That opinion has been criticized, however, by those believe that the surge of public concern is more closely connected to a dramatic shift in political campaigns, public initiatives, and partisan appeals.

=== Keith Jackson ===
A 1989 Washington Post investigative story accused the administration of setting up an 18-year-old black man from Baltimore in a sting operation to showcase the drug problem close to home. The DEA, using an undercover agent, pushed a black 18-year-old high school student, Keith Jackson, to make a sale of crack outside the White House. (Jackson had already sold cocaine to agents on four other occasions.) In a recorded conversation with the agents, Jackson can be heard saying "Where the [Expletive] is the White House?" The agents set up a buy with Jackson in Lafayette Park, just across the street from the White House. Jackson was arrested and convicted of felony possession of crack cocaine with intent to distribute. He had no prior convictions but was sentenced to 10 years in prison based on the mandatory minimum laws of 1988. After his conviction, Jackson was visibly in tears. U.S. District Judge Stanley Sporkin told Jackson at his sentencing, "Bush used you, in the sense of making a big drug speech. But he's a decent man, a man of great compassion. Maybe he can find a way to reduce at least some of that sentence." Bush, when asked about the story, told the Washington Post, "The man went there and sold drugs in front of the White House, didn't he?... I can't feel sorry for this fellow."

=== Evidence of mass incarceration ===
The focus of the administration's National Drug Strategy (NDS) called for tough guaranteed punishment for drug dealers and a reduced response in penalties for users. The plan also laid out funding for treatment and education but ultimately believed that "none of these can be effective unless America restores the rule of law in its cities and holds drug users accountable for the damage they cause society."

The policy laid out by the administration represented the largest increase in resources for law enforcement in the nations history. Critics have stated that the policy spawned the creation of the prison–industrial complex. The NDS allocated nearly $1.5 billion in 1990 for the construction of 24,000 new federal prison beds, an increase of 1 billion dollars from 1989.

The policy also increased funding for security in public housing projects from $8 million to $50 million.

By the end of Bush's presidency in 1993, he had presided over one of the greatest hikes in imprisonment in the nation's history. During his four years, there was a 39% increase in incarcerations, an increase of 16,946 prisoners from the eight years of the Reagan administration.

By the end the Bush presidency, 9.18% of all black people in the United States were in prison, on probation, or on parole, but only 1.76% of the white population in the United States were in one of those situations. In 1993, there were 6 times as many black Americans in local jails per 100,000 inmates as there were white Americans. From 1989, when Bush took office, to 1993, when he left, the number of black males in American prisons increased by 300,000 people. The number of white males increased by 50,000 inmates. The number of sentences for drugs increased from 25,309 in 1989 to 48,554 in 1993.

== Clinton administration ==
During his presidential campaign, Bill Clinton declared that no other president would be tougher on crime. Some scholars have argued that Clinton advanced the war on drugs further than any previous president had imagined possible.

=== Violent Crime and Law Enforcement Act ===
Clinton signed the 1994 Crime Bill, which was written by Senator Joe Biden of Delaware. It included 30 billion dollars' worth of federal anticrime funding. Specific to the war on drugs, Clinton included the three-strikes law, which required a mandatory life sentence for any felony violent crime conviction after two other prior convictions. Some social justice critics argue that the law disproportionately affected criminals in urban neighborhoods hurt by policing the war on drugs, rather than white-collar criminals. The bill also authorized $16 million in new funding for the development of federal prisons and state and local police forces. The Justice Policy Institute stated in 2008 that the administration's "tough on crime" policies caused larger increases in federal and state inmate populations than for any other president in American history.

The act also saw the expansion of the federal death penalty. Sixty new capital punishment charges were created including non-homicidal narcotics offenses, drive-by shootings resulting in death, and carjackings relating to death. Between 1994 and 1999, nearly two thirds of people sentenced to the federal death penalty were black during Clinton's presidency, nearly seven times that of their representation in the US population. During his two terms, the federal prison population increased from 1.3 million to 2 million inmates.

The law featured a provision that removed the approval of Pell Grants for low-income inmates in federal prison. That prevented most inmates in federal or state prison from continuing their education while they were locked up.

=== "One Strike and You're Out" policy" ===
Scholars have argued that Clinton's policies came in an attempt to swing back the tide of white voters who had left the party two decades earlier to support Reagan. The Clinton administration articulated that the policies were an attempt to be fiscally conservative and to slash the federal budget deficit.

During the administration, the federal budget saw a reduction in public housing funding by $17 billion. The federal corrections programs received a $19 billion, which a 61 percent decrease in public housing funding and a 171 percent increase in federal prison budgeting. Scholars argue that the construction of federal prisons replaced the major public housing programs for the urban poor. Clinton's "One Strike and You're Out" policy stated, "From now on, the rule for residents who commit crime and peddle drugs should be one strike and you're out." Any tenant of public housing convicted of any drug-related offence would no longer have access to public housing.

== Controversial policies ==
A number of policies introduced during the war on drugs have been singled out as particularly racially disproportionate.

=== Mandatory minimums ===
The Anti-Drug Abuse Act of 1986 established a 100-1 sentencing disparity for the possession of crack or powder cocaine. Possession of 500 g of powder cocaine triggered a five-year mandatory minimum sentence, but it took possession of 5 g of crack cocaine to trigger the same mandatory minimum penalty. In addition, the Anti-Drug Abuse Act of 1988 established a one-year mandatory minimum penalty for simple possession of crack cocaine, which made crack cocaine the only controlled substance for which a first possession offense triggered a mandatory minimum penalty.

A 1992 study found that mandatory minimum sentencing caused blacks and Hispanics to receive more-severe sentences than their white counterparts from 1984 to 1990.

In 1995, the United States Sentencing Commission delivered a report to Congress concluding that because 80% of crack offenders were black, the 100–1 disparity disproportionately affected minorities. It recommended for the crack-powder sentencing ratio to be amended, and other sentencing guidelines to be re-evaluated. Its recommendations were rejected by Congress. By contrast, certain authors have pointed out that the Congressional Black Caucus backed the Anti-Drug Abuse Act of 1986, which implied that that law could not be racist.

In 2010, Congress passed the Fair Sentencing Act, which reduced the sentencing disparity between crack and powder cocaine from 100–1 to 18–1. The mandatory minimum penalty was amended to take effect for possession of crack cocaine in excess of 28 g.

Mandatory minimum penalties have been criticized for failing to apply uniformly to all cases of illegal behavior.

2009. Percent of adult males incarcerated by race and ethnicity.

== Crime statistics ==
=== Stops and searches ===
A 2015 report conducted by the US Department of Justice found that black drivers in Ferguson, Missouri, were over twice as likely to be searched during vehicle stops but were found in possession of contraband 26% less often than white drivers.

A 2016 report conducted by the San Francisco District Attorney's Office concluded that racial disparities exist regarding stops, searches, and arrests by the San Francisco Police Department and that the disparities were especially salient for the black population. Blacks made up almost 42% of all non-consensual searches after a stop but accounted for fewer than 15% of all stops in 2015. Of all people searched without consent, Black and Hispanic people had the lowest "hit rates" (i.e., the lowest rate of contraband recovered).

A 2016 Chicago Police Accountability Task Force report found that black and Hispanic drivers were searched by the Chicago Police more than four times more frequently than white drivers, but white drivers were found with contraband twice as often as black and Hispanic drivers.

=== Arrests ===
A 1995 Bureau of Justice Statistics report found that from 1991 to 1993, 16% of those who sold drugs were black, but 49% of those arrested for doing so were black.

A 2006 study concluded that blacks were significantly overrepresented for those arrested for drug delivery offenses in Seattle. The same study found that it was a result of law enforcement focusing on crack offenders and outdoor venues and dedicating resources to racially-heterogeneous neighborhoods.

A 2010 study found little difference by race with regards to the rates of adolescent drug dealing. A 2012 study found that black youths were less likely than white youths to use or sell drugs but more likely to be arrested for doing so.

A 2013 study by the American Civil Liberties Union determined that a black person in the United States was 3.73 times more likely to be arrested for marijuana possession than a white person, but both races have similar rates of marijuana use. Iowa had the highest racial disparity of the fifty states. Blacks in Iowa were arrested for marijuana possession at a rate 8.4 times higher than whites. One factor that may explain the difference in arrest rates between whites and blacks is that blacks are more likely than whites to buy marijuana outdoors, from a stranger, and away from home.

A 2015 study concluded that minorities have been disproportionately arrested for drug offenses and the difference could not "be explained by differences in drug offending, non-drug offending, or residing in the kinds of neighborhoods likely to have heavy police emphasis on drug offending."

The nature of the U.S.-sponsored war on drugs creates two dangerous consequences that often go largely unnoticed: racial profiling and irreversible harm done through legislation, both at the international and domestic spheres. With the introduction of the USA Patriot Act in October 2001 the United States appears to employ a surveillance strategy that ultimately weakens the civil rights of those affected, often through unbalanced criminal proceedings. These policies fail to acknowledge South American women's realities, which are intersectionality observed through socioeconomic positions, cultural and gender expectations, and unfamiliarity with the English language in criminal procedures Studies have shown the increase of racial profiling in Latino women as a method to deter the war on drugs, creating power imbalances as U.S. policies are pushed to national South American governments. The war on drugs has caused irreversible consequences to Latino women that should shape future understanding of the harms of racial profiling and not addressing the deeper issues of individual realities in the conflict.

=== Sentencing ===
In 1998, there were wide racial disparities in arrests, prosecutions, sentencing, and deaths. Black people, despite being only 13% of regular drug users, made up for 35% of drug arrests, 55% of convictions, and 74% of people sent to prison for drug possession crimes. Nationwide African-Americans were sent to state prisons for drug offenses 13 times more often than white men.

Crime statistics show that in 1999 in the United States, blacks were far more likely to be targeted by law enforcement for drug crimes, and they received much stiffer penalties and sentences than whites. A 2000 study found that the disproportionality of black drug offenders in Pennsylvania prisons was unexplained by higher arrest rates, which suggested the possibility of operative discrimination in sentencing.

A 2008 paper stated that drug use rates by blacks (7.4%) were comparable to those by whites (7.2%), and since there are far more whites than blacks, 72% of illegal drug users in America are white, and only 15% are black.

According to Michelle Alexander, the author of The New Jim Crow and a professor of law at Stanford Law School, drug trading is done at similar rates all over the US, but most people arrested for it are colored. Together, blacks and Hispanics were 58% of all prisoners in 2008 but only one quarter of the US population. Most prisoners are arrested for drug related crime, and in at least 15 states, three quarters of them are black or Latino.

A 2012 report by the United States Sentencing Commission found that drug sentences for black men were 13.1% longer than drug sentences for white men between 2007 and 2009.

=== Rehabilitation ===
Professor Cathy Schnieder of International Service at American University noted that in 1989, blacks, representing 12-15% of all drug use in the United States, made up 41% of all arrests. That was a noted increase from 38% in 1988. Whites were 47% of those in state-funded treatment centers but fewer than 10% of those committed to prison.

=== Incarceration by race and ethnicity ===
2010. Inmates in adult facilities, by race and ethnicity. Jails, and state and federal prisons
Race, ethnicity	% of US population	% of U.S. incarcerated population	National incarceration rate (per 100,000 of all ages)
White (non-Hispanic)	64	39	450 per 100,000
Hispanic	16	19	831 per 100,000
Black	13	40	2,306 per 100,000

== Legal history ==
Some have suggested that US Supreme Court rulings related to the war on drugs have reinforced racially-disproportionate treatment.

In United States v. Armstrong (1996), the Supreme Court heard the case of Armstrong, a black man charged with conspiring to possess and distribute more than 50 g of crack cocaine. Facing the District Court, Armstrong claimed that he was singled out for prosecution because of his race and he filed a motion for discovery. The District Court granted the motion, required the government to provide statistics from the last three years on similar crimes, and dismissed Armstrong's case after the government refused to do so.

The government appealed the decision, and the US Court of Appeals affirmed the dismissal by holding that defendants in selective-prosecution claims did not have to demonstrate that the government had failed to prosecute similar cases. The case was then sent to the Supreme Court, which reversed the decision and held that defendants had to show that the government had failed to prosecute similar cases.

In United States v. Bass (2002), the Supreme Court heard a similar case. John Bass was charged with two counts of homicide, and the government sought the death penalty. Bass filed for dismissal, along with a discovery request alleging that the death sentence was racially motivated. When the government refused to comply with the discovery request, the District Court dismissed the death penalty notice. Upon appeal, the US Court of Appeals affirmed the dismissal, and the case was sent to the Supreme Court.

Reversing the decision, the Supreme Court ruled that a defendant in a selective prosecution case had to make a "credible showing" of evidence that the prosecution policy in question was intentionally discriminatory. The court ruled that Bass did not do so because he failed to show that similar cases with those different races were treated differently. Specifically, the Court rejected Bass's use of national statistics and held that they were not representative of cases.

Both cases have been criticized for perpetuating racially motivated legal standards. It has been suggested that the current standard is impossible to meet for selective prosecution claims because the relevant data may not exist, or the prosecution may have sole access to it.

== Effects of war on drugs ==
=== Negative health effects ===
Felony drug convictions often lead to circumstances that carry negative health-related consequences. Employment opportunities (and associated healthcare benefits), access to public housing and food stamps, and financial support for higher education are all jeopardized, if not eliminated, as a result of such a conviction. In addition, a felony distribution charge often precludes a convict from benefiting from most healthcare programs that receive federal funding.

=== Collateral consequences ===
Some authors have suggested that the collateral consequences of criminal conviction are more serious than the legal penalties. In many cases, statutes do not require that convicts are informed of these consequences. Many felons cannot be employed by the federal government or work in government jobs, as they do not meet the standards to gain security clearance. Felons convicted of distributing or selling drugs may not enlist in the military.

Certain states are financially incentivized to exclude criminals from access to public housing. All states receive less federal highway funding if they fail to revoke or suspend driver's licenses of drug-related felons.

Collateral consequences, and felon disenfranchisement in particular, have historically been at least partially racially motivated.

=== African-American communities ===
The war on drugs has incarcerated high numbers of African-Americans. However, the damage has compounded beyond individuals to affect African-American communities as a whole, with some social scientists suggesting the war on drugs could not be maintained without societal racism and the manipulation of racial stereotypes.

African-American children are overrepresented in juvenile hall and family court cases, a trend that began during the war on drugs. From 1985 to 1999, admissions of blacks under the age of 18 increased by 68%. Some authors posit that the overrepresentation is caused by minority juveniles committing crime more often and more serious crimes.

A compounding factor is often the imprisonment of a father. Boys with imprisoned fathers are significantly less likely to develop the skills necessary for success in early education. In addition, African-American youth often turn to gangs to generate income for their families, oftentimes more effectively than at a minimum wage or entry-level job. Still, this occurs even as substance abuse, especially marijuana, has largely declined among high school students. In contrast, many black youths drop out of school, are subsequently tried for drug-related crime, and acquire AIDS at disparate levels.

In addition, the high incarceration rate has led to the juvenile justice system and family courts to use race as a negative heuristic in trials, leading to a reinforcing effect. As more African-Americans are incarcerated, the more the heuristic is enforced in the eyes of the courts, which contributes to yet higher imprisonment rates among African-American children.

High numbers of African American arrests and charges of possession show that although most drug users in the United States are white, blacks are the largest group being targeted as the root of the problem. Furthermore, a study by Andrew Golub, Bruce Johnson, and Eloise Dunlap affirms the racial divide in drug arrests, notably marijuana arrests, where blacks with no prior arrests (0.9%) or one prior arrest (4.3%) were nearly twice as likely to be sentenced to jail as their white counterparts (0.4% and 2.3%, respectively). Harboring such emotions can lead to a lack of will to contact the police in case of an emergency by members of African-American communities, ultimately leaving many people unprotected. Disproportionate arrests in African-American communities for drug-related offenses has not only spread fear but also perpetuated a deep distrust for government and what some call racist drug enforcement policy.

Additionally, a black-white disparity can be seen in probation revocation since black probationers were revoked at higher rates than white and Hispanic probationers in studies as published under the Urban Institute.

=== Women of color ===
The war on drugs also plays a negative role in the lives of women of color. The number of black women imprisoned in the United States increased at a rate more than twice that of black men, over 64% from 1986 to 1991. During that same period, the percentage of females incarcerated for drug-related offenses more than doubled. In 1989, black and white women had similar levels of drug use during pregnancy. However, black women were 10 times as likely as white women to be reported to a child welfare agency for prenatal drug use. In 1997, of women in state prisons for drug-related crimes, forty-four percent were Hispanic, thirty-nine percent were black, and twenty-three percent were white, quite different from the racial make up shown in percentages of the United States as a whole. Statistics in England, Wales, and Canada are similar. Women of color who are implicated in drug crimes are "generally poor, uneducated, and unskilled; have impaired mental and physical health; are victims of physical and sexual abuse and mental cruelty; are single mothers with children; lack familial support; often have no prior convictions; and are convicted for a small quantity of drugs".

Additionally, these women typically have an economic attachment to, or fear of, male drug traffickers, creating a power paradigm that sometimes forces their involvement in drug-related crimes. Though there are programs to help them, women of color are usually unable to take advantage of social welfare institutions in America due to regulations. For example, women's access to methadone, which suppresses cravings for drugs such as heroin, is restricted by state clinics that set appointment times for women to receive their treatment. If they miss their appointment, (which is likely: drug-addicted women may not have access to transportation and lead chaotic lives), they are denied medical care critical to their recovery. Additionally, while women of color are offered jobs as a form of government support, these jobs often do not have childcare, rendering the job impractical for mothers, who cannot leave their children at home alone.

However, with respect to mandatory minimum sentencing, female offenders receive relief almost 20% more often than male offenders. In addition, female offenders, on average, receive lighter sentences than those who commit similar offenses.

== See also ==
- Methamphetamine and Native Americans
- Race and crime
- Race and crime in the United States
- Race in the United States criminal justice system
- Racial profiling in the United States
- United States incarceration rate
