= Murder of Ronil Singh =

2018 murder of a police officer

Ronil Singh (April 6, 1985 – December 26, 2018) was a Fijian-born American police officer who was shot and killed on the morning of December 26, 2018, in Newman, California, by a driver he had pulled over on suspicion of driving while drunk. Paulo Mendoza, a 31-year-old Mexican, was arrested three days later. Prior to his arrest for the murder of Singh, Mendoza was found guilty of multiple offenses.

== Incident ==
Singh grew up in the town of Naitata, Navua, Fiji. He emigrated to California in 2003 with his family. He attended police academy and joined the Newman, California Police Department in 2011.

While working on Christmas Day, Singh was shot by a motorist whom he had pulled over because he appeared to be driving under the influence of alcohol or drugs.

The shooter drove off and was captured after a 55-hour manhunt.

== Suspect ==
The accused murderer, a citizen of Mexico, and had previously been charged with driving under the influence. He was wanted for failing to serve his sentence on two previous charges.

Although the suspect had identified himself as Gustavo Arriaga Perez, his real name was Paulo Virgen Mendoza, born December 28, 1986.

Stanislaus County Sheriff Adam Christianson stated that the suspect had twice been arrested for driving under the influence, and that he spoke openly about being affiliated with a gang. His first arrest, for a felony DUI with an injury to a man, was on August 14, 2011. He was arrested on a second misdemeanor DUI on June 5, 2014. A court sentenced him to serve five days in jail, and three years of probation for the 2011 DUI, as well as to enroll in a DUI program. However, he never showed up, and the warrant was still outstanding when he shot Singh four years later.

The suspected shooter was scheduled to appear in court in January 2015 to be arraigned for his second DUI case, but court records reveal he never showed up. A warrant was then issued for his arrest.

He appeared in court on January 2, 2019 and was charged with the murder of Officer Singh, although the trial was suspended temporarily for a mental health evaluation requested by his attorney.

Mendoza was cleared by psychiatrists to stand trial on April 2, 2019. On April 11, 2019, Mendoza initially pled not guilty to the murder, but later pled guilty to first-degree murder as well as other special circumstances on a trial on November 5, 2020 as part of a plea deal to avoid the death penalty. He was sentenced to life without parole.

== Political attention ==
President Trump drew attention to the crime immediately after the arrest, and in a January 9, 2019 in an address from the Oval Office on the need to build a wall between the United States and Mexico, saying, "“America’s heart broke the day after Christmas when a young police officer in California was savagely murdered in cold blood by an illegal alien, who just came across the border,... The life of an American hero was stolen by someone who had no right to be in our country.” Singh's brother, Reggi Singh, accompanied President Trump on a visit to the Mexican border in Texas.

Stanislaus County Sheriff Christianson said that, “Law enforcement was prohibited because of sanctuary laws, and that led to the encounter with Officer Singh,... “I’m suggesting that the outcome could have been different if law enforcement wasn’t restricted, prohibited or had their hands tied because of political interference.”

The case has been compared to the 2015 Shooting of Kathryn Steinle in San Francisco and the 2018 Killing of Mollie Tibbetts in Iowa.

Nicole Malliotakis wrote that "Corporal Singh's name must now be added to the growing list of Americans that includes Kate Steinle, Kayla Cuevas, Nisa Mickens, and Mollie Tibbetts, who were all killed by individuals who were unlawfully in our nation. The most recent victim, 22 year-old Pierce Kennedy Corcoran, was killed by an unlicensed and uninsured illegal immigrant driver on the last Saturday of 2018 in Knoxville, Tennessee. The simple fact is, if we had stronger border security in lieu of sanctuary policies that protect those in our country illegally, these six young (average age 23) Americans, would still be alive today."

Former California Governor Jerry Brown denied that the Ronil Singh's death had anything to do with California's new sanctuary law.

== See also ==
- Office of Victims of Immigration Crime Engagement
- Illegal immigration to the United States and crime
