= Illegal immigration to the United States and crime =

Illegal immigration to the United States and crime is a legal and political topic in the United States. In the United States, "illegal re-entry" is a felony, "improper entry" is a misdemeanor and "unlawful presence" is a civil violation. Research examining links between illegal immigration and crime often disregard the act of entering the United States itself as a crime, and typically focus on rates of incarceration, violent crime, property crime, and traffic offenses.

There is widespread scholarly consensus that illegal immigrants commit less crime than native-born Americans. Sanctuary cities—which limit or deny cooperation with the national government in enforcing immigration law—have no statistically meaningful impact on crime, and may reduce the crime rate. Research suggests that immigration enforcement has no impact on crime rates. Claims of a link between illegal immigration and crime is often asserted by right-wing politicians and media, which some commentators have argued are made in bad faith.

== Research ==
=== Relationship between immigration status and crime ===
Entering the US without documented permission from the US government is an "offense" or a misdemeanor. According to some empirical evidence that disregarded illegal immigration itself as a crime, immigrants (including illegal immigrants) were otherwise less likely to commit crimes than native-born citizens in the United States.

A 2020 paper by the Cato Institute found that the illegal immigrant conviction rate in Texas was 45 percent lower than the conviction rate of native-born Texans. Texas is the only state that gathers an arrestee's biometric data through the Department of Homeland Security's system tracking illegal immigrants and that maintains the records of an arrestee's immigration status.

A 2018 study found that undocumented immigration to the United States did not increase violent crime rates. A 2017 study found that "Increased undocumented immigration was significantly associated with reductions in drug arrests, drug overdose deaths, and DUI arrests, net of other factors." A 2017 study found that California's extension of driving licenses to unauthorized immigrants "did not increase the total number of accidents or the occurrence of fatal accidents, but it did reduce the likelihood of hit and run accidents, thereby improving traffic safety and reducing costs for California drivers ... providing unauthorized immigrants with access to driver's licenses can create positive externalities for the communities in which they live."

A 2018 study in the American Economic Journal: Economic Policy found that by restricting the employment opportunities for unauthorized immigrants, the Immigration Reform and Control Act of 1986 (IRCA) likely caused an increase in crime rates. A 2018 PLOS One study estimated that the undocumented immigrant population in the United States was 22 million, approximately twice as large as the estimate derived from the United States Census Bureau's figures. An author of the study notes that this has implications for the relationship between undocumented immigration and crime, suggesting that the crime rate among undocumented immigrants is significantly lower than previously estimated: "You have the same number of crimes but now spread over twice as many people as was believed before, which right away means that the crime rate among undocumented immigrants is essentially half whatever was previously believed."

According to analysis of the 2010 United States census, "immigrants to the United States are significantly less likely than native-born citizens to be incarcerated. The authors found that 1.6 percent of immigrant males age 18–39 are incarcerated, compared to 3.3 percent of the native-born... The divide was even sharper when the authors examined the incarceration rate among immigrant men the authors believe likely to be undocumented — specifically less-educated men from El Salvador and Guatemala between age 18–29. ... According to the analysis, these likely undocumented immigrants had an incarceration rate of 1.7 percent, compared with 10.7 percent for native-born men without a high school diploma".

A 2016 study of an effort to reduce crime in North Carolina by identifying and deporting illegal immigrants showed no correlation between increased deportation enforcement and local crime rates.

A 2018 study found no evidence that apprehensions of undocumented immigrants in districts in the United States reduced crime rates.

A 2020 study found that native-born US citizens are incarcerated at higher rates for homicide in Texas than undocumented immigrants.

According to immigration analyst Alex Nowrasteh, and criminologist Barry Latzer, Texas is the only state that tracks illegal immigrants by the specific crime committed. Homicide data are regarded as more accurate than data on other crimes because "a much higher proportion of murders are solved." The Texas data for 2016 showed that the rate of murder convictions in 2016 was 3.2 per 100,000 native-born Americans, 0.9 for every 100,000 legal immigrants and 1.8 per 100,000 illegal immigrants.

=== Perception ===
Research suggests that people overestimate the relationship between immigration and criminality.

A January 2024 survey in the U.S. found that 57% of Americans believe migrants lead to more crime, which some experts attribute to anecdotal media stories that lack context. Graham Ousey believes the perception stems from flashpoint events that politicians use to push up the myth that immigrants create more crime. Donald Trump has been the most prominent promoter of the false link between immigration and crime, according to the Associated Press. Guadalupe Correa-Cabrera argues it is a cornerstone of the MAGA platform.

Americans dramatically overestimate the relationship between refugees and terrorism. A 2020 study of media coverage from 1900-2013 found an increasing framing of stories in prominent news media helps to explain the misperception among many Americans that immigration increases crime, such as treating immigration itself as a crime and covering fewer crimes committed against immigrants. A 2018 study found that media coverage of immigrants in the United States has a general tendency to emphasize illegality and/or criminal behavior in a way that is inconsistent with actual immigrant demographics. These findings are consistent with a 2019 study showing that the news covering crime implies that there is a racial or immigration factor based on the stories selected and descriptors of the suspects, creating an inaccurate view of the impacts of immigration on crime, which are not significant. A study of coverage of refugees in the Guardian and the Times in the UK from 2015-2018 found that media portrayals made Muslim refugees seem like threats to the economy or security and exaggerated differences between these refugees and the native population.

==== Political consequences ====
Research suggests a vicious cycle of bigotry and immigrant alienation could exacerbate immigrant criminality and bigotry. For instance, UC San Diego political scientist Claire Adida, Stanford University political scientist David Laitin, and Sorbonne University economist Marie-Anne Valfort argue:

[F]ear-based policies that target groups of people according to their religion or region of origin are counter-productive. Our own research, which explains the failed integration of Muslim immigrants in France, suggests that such policies can feed into a vicious cycle that damages national security. French Islamophobia—a response to cultural difference—has encouraged Muslim immigrants to withdraw from French society, which then feeds back into French Islamophobia, thus further exacerbating Muslims' alienation, and so on. Indeed, the failure of French security in 2015 was likely due to police tactics that intimidated rather than welcomed the children of immigrants—an approach that makes it hard to obtain crucial information from community members about potential threats.

A study of the long-run effects of the 9/11 terrorist attacks found that the post-9/11 increase in hate crimes against Muslims decreased assimilation by Muslim immigrants. Controlling for relevant factors, the authors found that "Muslim immigrants living in states with the sharpest increase in hate crimes also exhibit: greater chances of marrying within their own ethnic group; higher fertility; lower female labour force participation; and lower English proficiency." Hate crimes and family separation have also been consequences of rhetoric linking crime to migration from Mexico. Individuals who believe that African Americans and Hispanics are more prone to violence are more likely to support capital punishment.

The Dillingham Commission singled out immigrants from Southern Europe for their involvement in violent crime (even though the data did not support its conclusions). The commission's overall findings provided the rationale for sweeping 1920s immigration-reduction acts, including the Emergency Quota Act of 1921, which favored immigration from northern and western Europe by restricting the annual number of immigrants from any given country to 3 percent of the total number of people from that country living in the United States in 1910. The movement for immigration restriction that the Dillingham Commission helped to stimulate culminated in the National Origins Formula, part of the Immigration Act of 1924, which capped national immigration at 150,000 annually and completely barred immigration from Asia.

== Procedures ==
Individuals who are in the United States illegally and who have been convicted of crimes are eligible to be deported under federal law. Research suggests that immigration enforcement has no impact on crime rates.

=== Sanctuary cities ===
Crimes committed by illegal immigrants who had previously been arrested or convicted of crimes have been a focus of particular attention. Sanctuary cities—which adopt policies designed to avoid prosecuting people solely for being in the country illegally—have no statistically meaningful impact on crime, and may reduce the crime rate.

Discussion has been particularly intense when an illegal alien has been arrested for a minor offense and is known to be in the country illegally is released because the jurisdiction where he was arrested is a sanctuary city that limits police cooperation with U.S. Immigration and Customs Enforcement (ICE,) and goes on to commit a new crime. Examples include the 2018 Tulare County shootings, where the suspect had previously served time in American prisons and been deported twice before being arrested on a misdemeanor and released under California Sanctuary Law SB54 the day before he killed two and wounded seven in a spree shooting.

== Laws and regulations ==
=== Special Order 40 (1979) ===
Special Order 40 is a directive issued jointly by the Los Angeles City Council and the Los Angeles Police Department (LAPD) under Chief Daryl Gates and the Los Angeles City Council in 1979 prohibiting officers of the LAPD officers from questioning individuals for the sole purpose of whether they were in the United States legally. The Special Order was the center of controversy following the 2008 Murder of Jamiel Shaw II by a perpetrator who was a member of the 18th Street gang and an illegal immigrant to the United States. An effort to put a repeal measure on the ballot in 2009 failed. Police Commissioner William Bratton successfully opposed rescinding the Special Order.

=== Arizona SB 1070 (2010) ===
The Support Our Law Enforcement and Safe Neighborhoods Act (Arizona SB 1070) was enacted by the Arizona legislature in 2010 as a response to broad public dislike of illegal immigration among Arizona voters, and by a widespread belief that a great deal of crime was being committed by illegal immigrants that persisted despite a scholarly consensus that illegal immigrants commit proportionately fewer crimes than American citizens and that crime was declining at the border. Public support for the bill was driven by the March 2010 murder of Arizona rancher Robert Krentz.

=== Texas Senate Bill 4 (2017) ===
Texas Senate Bill 4 was enacted in 2017 to block municipalities in Texas from becoming sanctuary cities, that is, to prevent local authorities from refusing to cooperate with federal authorities in enforcing immigration laws by directing police and court officials not to question persons accused of crimes about their immigration status and to ignore requests by federal authorities to hold individuals who are in the country illegally and have been arrested for minor crimes for deportation. Texas Senate Bill 4 also allows police officers to check the immigration status of those they detain if they choose.

== Political debate ==
=== "Trump Hypothesis" and 2016 Presidential election ===
During his presidential campaign Donald Trump asserted that the immigrants are responsible for higher levels of violent and drug-related crime in the United States. A 2016 study was undertaken to test this hypothesis, specifically with regard to immigrants from Mexico. According to the study, "Results largely contradict the Trump Hypothesis: no evidence links Mexican or undocumented Mexican immigrants specifically to violent or drug-related crime."

In July 2015, Donald Trump invited what he terms Angel Families, families who have had a member killed by an illegal immigrant to meet with him. Some had lost relatives in road accidents, others were shot or stabbed, but all had family members who died due to actions taken by what Trump describes as people who never should have been in the U.S. in the first place. The Remembrance Project, a nonprofit that works to draw attention to the victims of crimes committed by illegal immigrants, helped the campaign locate families of victims.

During the 2016 Republican Party presidential primaries, a political advertisement showing mugshots of illegal immigrants who committed violent crimes in the U.S. alternate with footage of candidate Jeb Bush saying, "Yeah, they broke the law, but it's not a felony.... It's an act of love," is regarded as having played a role in Bush's withdrawal from the race. At a May 2016 campaign rally, Trump told an audience that illegal immigrants "Raped, sodomized and killed" Americans. Jamiel Shaw, Sr., the father of a high school student murdered by an illegal immigrant in 2008, became a spokesman for the Trump campaign.

=== Trump Presidency ===
During his presidency, Donald Trump had repeatedly asserted that crimes committed by illegal immigrants to the United States make the construction of a wall along the U.S.-Mexico border an urgent necessity. Trump's assertions about crimes committed by illegal immigrants were regularly shown to be inaccurate.

The latest rise in crime occurred in 2020 during the Trump presidency, when immigration was historically low due to COVID restrictions.

=== 2018 midterm election ===
"One Nation," a political nonprofit supporting Republican candidates, produced an ad showing a masked, knife-wielding man with a voice saying, "We need tough immigration enforcement to keep dangerous criminals out." Other ads criticized sanctuary cities, something Matt Gorman, spokesman for the National Republican Congressional Committee, said that many Americans oppose.

=== 2024 election ===
Some politicians and commentators have criticized the most vocal commentators linking immigration and crime as doing so in bad faith for political gain.

A January 2024 survey in the U.S. found that 57% of Americans believe migrants lead to more crime, which some experts attribute to anecdotal media stories that lack context. Graham Ousey believes the perception stems from flashpoint events that politicians use to push up the myth that immigrants create more crime. Donald Trump has been the most prominent promoter of the false link between immigration and crime, according to the Associated Press. Guadalupe Correa-Cabrera argues it is a cornerstone of the MAGA platform.

== See also ==
- Immigration and crime
- Immigration and crime in Germany
- Disinformation
- Dog whistle (politics)
- Fear of crime
- Fearmongering
- Human trafficking in the United States
- Race and crime in the United States
- Sensationalism
