= Murder of Casey Chadwick =

American murder case

On June 15, 2015, Casey Chadwick was stabbed to death in her Norwich, Connecticut home by Jean Jacques. Jacques had been convicted of a 1996 attempted murder and served 15 years in prison, was released from the custody of the U.S. Immigration and Naturalization Service for deportation, but was never deported because the government of his nation of birth and citizenship, Haiti, refused to accept him. The case "received widespread attention" and "sparked outrage" because Jacques was not deported and committed a second murder after his release from federal custody.

== Crime ==
Jacques stabbed Chadwick to death in her apartment on Spaulding Street in Norwich, Connecticut following what is thought to have been an argument about drugs that belonged to Chadwick's boyfriend, a drug dealer.

=== Victim ===
As a result of her daughter's death, Chadwick's mother, Wendy Hartling, became active in the Remembrance Project and an active supporter of President Trump.

== Perpetrator ==
Jacques is an illegal immigrant.

Jacques, a Haitian citizen, arrived in the United States in 1992 after being intercepted in a boat off the Florida coast.

== Previous crime and failed deportation ==
In 1996, Jacques was involved in a shooting on Laurel Hill Avenue in Norwich in which his former girlfriend suffered a serious head injury and her new boyfriend was killed. Jacques was convicted on weapons charges and attempted murder. He served 15 years in prison and was released in January 2012 into custody of Immigration and Customs Enforcement (ICE). He was held by ICE for 205 days, while arrangements were made to deport him to Haiti. At the last minute, the government of Haiti refused to take him, citing his lack of identity documents. He was released by ICE on Nov. 9, 2012 (time unknown).

Jacques could not be deported because the Haitian government refused to accept him, saying that he could not prove that he was a citizen. Federal agencies failed to deport Jacques on three separate occasions between 2002 and the murder of Chadwick.

Senator Richard Blumenthal and Representative Joe Courtney jointly introduced "Casey's Law," a bill intended to expedite deportation of illegal immigrants who pose a threat to public safety or who have committed a violent crime, and to "crack down" on countries that delay or refuse official U.S. attempts to deport dangerous criminals to their home country. However, the bill was never voted on. The bill was introduced as S.3277 on July 14, 2016. No hearings were scheduled or documented relating to the bill. The bill was again introduced on October 19, 2021 as H.R.2647. Again, there are no hearing transcripts or agendas indicating that the subcommittee held a hearing on it.

=== Federal investigation ===
In January 2016, the Department of Homeland Security opened an investigation into the handling of the Jacques deportation by Immigration and Customs Enforcement. The report found that while ICE had failed to pursue all possible avenues to establish Jacques’ Haitian citizenship, it was unlikely to have been able to satisfy the government of Haiti even if it had pursued all possible ways to establish his birth and citizenship.

== Legal proceedings ==
Jacques was convicted of murdering Chadwick and was sentenced to 60 years in prison, the maximum sentence for murder in Connecticut.

Jacques' attorneys filed an appeal of the conviction on procedural grounds and the appellate case has been accepted by the State Supreme Court. The appeal is based on the question of whether Norwich police needed a warrant to search Jacques' home on July 15, 2015; his lease on the apartment had expired at the time the search was conducted.

== Public and political attention ==
In a 2016 campaign speech, Donald Trump criticized "a Supreme Court decision, if these violent offenders cannot be sent home, our law enforcement officers have to release them into your communities... the results are horrific, horrific. There are often terrible consequences, such as Casey Chadwick’s tragic death in Connecticut just last year."

During another campaign speech he blamed his opponent Hillary Clinton, for her "refusal," during her term as Secretary of State to force foreign governments to take "killers" back, asserting that, "One foreign national and convicted killer who should have been sent back to his home country in 2012 was instead set free by Clinton's watch. Six months after his release, he killed again, murdering a 25-year old beautiful Casey Chadwick.

State Representative Joe Courtney complained of "a breakdown in the system that allowed a convicted felon with a deportation order to return to the Norwich community."

Senator Richard Blumenthal, Senator Chris Murphy and Representative Joe Courtney stated that, "It is unacceptable that ICE failed to remove a convicted attempted murderer subject to a final deportation order — a measure that would have saved the life of Casey Chadwick."

Representative John Culberson of Texas stated that when Haiti refused to take Jacques back the country should have been treated as Guyana was treated by the United States in 2001 when it refused to accept deportees; all visa approvals from Guyana to the United States were suspended until Guyana complied.
