= Tulare County shootings =

Shooting spree in Tulare County, California

- Location: Tulare County, California, United States
- Date: December 16, 2018
- Attack type: Shooting spree
- Weapon: 9mm semi-automatic pistol
- Deaths: 3 (including the perpetrator)
- Injuries: 7
- Perpetrator: Gustavo Garcia

A shooting spree began in farming country near Exeter, California on December 16, 2018, when a man with a gun began shooting at random people, and continued to do so throughout Tulare County for 24 hours. Three people, including the shooter, died. Seven others were injured.

The case attracted national attention in the U.S. because the shooter was a convicted felon who had served time in American prisons and had reentered the country illegally for a third time, following deportations in 2004 and 2014. The shooting reignited debate over California Sanctuary Law SB54 because the U.S. Immigration and Customs Enforcement requested the Tulare County sheriff's office to hold him in detention, but the Sheriff was unable to do so under the California Sanctuary Law. The shooting spree began shortly after the shooter was released.

== Shootings ==
Gustavo Garcia, (36) an illegal immigrant, began with a shooting of random victims in an orchard, and continued with a robbery at a convenience store, and more shootings, and a carjacking, ending with a wrong-way police chase on a highway. During the spree he shot a woman seated in her car in the parking lot of a Motel 6 in Tulare, shot up a Shell gasoline station in Pixley, shot and killed a person standing outside a gas station in Visalia, and, at around 3 a.m. on the morning of Monday the 17th, was reported to police for standing in his ex-girlfriend's backyard, yelling threats as he shot at her house. He then disappeared before police arrived.

Garcia was next spotted by a Tulare County Sheriff's deputy in a gray Honda SUV on a flat county road outside the city. The deputy attempted to stop the SUV, but Garcia shot the patrol car. He then fled into an orchard, where he brandished his gun at three farmworkers, and stole their GMC truck. He drove south in the northbound lanes of Highway 65 at high speed, smashing into multiple cars at speeds of more than 100 mph. Finally crashing the vehicle, the perpetrator was pronounced dead at the scene at around 7 o'clock on Monday morning. Before the spree ended, three people, including the shooter, were dead, and seven others were hospitalized with injuries.

Garcia had been arrested for being under the influence two days before he went on his crime spree, but was released because California police are not allowed to hold illegal aliens arrested for misdemeanors in order to turn them over to federal ICE agents for deportation. According to Tulare police, Garcia stole the ammunition he used in the shooting from a Walmart store which had not secured the ammunition properly.

Following Garcia's arrest, U.S. Immigration and Customs Enforcement (ICE) notified local police that he had already been deported twice, in 2004 and 2014. Garcia served 2 years in prison for a 2013 armed robbery, and another 27 months in prison for illegally reentering the country, before he was deported for the second time in 2014. ICE issued an immigration hold against Garcia following his arrest, but the hold was not honored.

Tulare County's Board of Supervisors had adopted a resolution opposing California's "Sanctuary State" law in May 2018, but the resolution did not alter the state law's prohibition of local police holding illegal aliens charged with misdemeanors for deportation by ICE.

== Perpetrator ==
Garcia Ruiz, a.k.a. "Junior", was an illegal immigrant who first arrived in the United States in 1992 as a minor. In 2002, he was accused of assault with a deadly weapon and conspiracy in Reedley, California; that same year, he was accused of armed robbery and possession of a firearm in Fresno, California. He was sentenced to one year in jail and three years' probation or to two years in prison; sources differ. He was deported to Mexico. Having returned to the United States illegally, he went on to spend 27 months in prison and was deported for a second time in 2014. García was arrested on a misdemeanor charge days before the shooting spree, but released under the provisions of the new California Sanctuary Law SB54.

== See also ==
- Illegal immigration to the United States and crime
