= Race and crime =

Research on racial disparities in criminal justice

Research into the relationship between race and crime has grown rapidly in recent years. More specifically, the research delves into the potential cause and effects of racial disparities in crime. This includes but is not limited to, disadvantages and inequality (racially, socially and economically), disparities in education, employment/unemployment, poverty, social status, and social/familial structure. Also of notable interest, is the role of exposure in childhood to violent behavior, another potential cause of racial disparities in crime.

Research conducted in Europe and the United States on the matter has been widely published, particularly in relation to discrimination by criminal justice systems. However, there is also a wide variety of research that branches off from this topic of discrimination by the criminal justice system. It has been argued that evidence for discrimination by the criminal justice system (and racial disparities occurring as a result) are potentially over interpreted and lacking supportive evidence. Therefore, it is important to consider other potential aspects of race as a correlate of crime and the multitude of potential causes and effects incorporated.

== Race and Crime on Women and Girls ==
Researcher Harmon and Boppre shed light onto the potential causes of the rise in the racial disparity between Black and White females by examining changes in the relative odds of Black female imprisonment to White female imprisonment. They found that the war on crime ultimately affected all racial groups in America, but the effects were more pronounced among African Americans and Latinos. This was revealed in official statistics, i.e., the Uniform Crime Report, managed by the FBI. The community puts their trust in crime statistics by the FBI to compare safer states, cities, or towns that display the number of crimes. However, research shows that female black offenders are often discriminated against by the law enforcement agencies. So although Black females are admitted to prison for drug crimes at an 83% higher rate than White females at the start of the war on drugs, by 2008 Black females' admittance rate was 338% higher, a quadrupling of the 1983 disparity. Researchers analyze the percentage of drug crimes committed by women and girls across different racial groups to identify issues within the data. The data highlight that the most important factor is victimization, Black female offenders are consistently condemned for their offenses while their victimizations are ignored.

== Victimization on Women and Girls ==
Acquaviva and colleagues examine the disparate treatment and experiences that Black and Latina victims face within the criminal legal system.Their findings show that women involved in crime frequently encounter unfair treatment by law enforcement—both when they are labeled as offenders and when they attempt to seek help as victims. The research also reveals that Black female offenders constitute the highest percentage among the racial groups studied, and the victim survey data clearly illustrates the discrimination they face.

Another key finding involves limitations in understanding how victim characteristics and behavior variables affect Black and Latina victims, due to the dichotomous way these variables were measured. The researchers noted disparities in detention and arrest rates across racial groups, showing that Black and Latina women were more likely to experience mistreatment or lack of assistance from law enforcement, even when they cooperated. The study additionally evaluated the policies of 36 police departments nationwide to determine how effectively they address profiling, police sexual misconduct, and other gendered aspects of policing.Researchers highlight the need for stronger, clearer policies to prevent racial profiling and ensure that Black female offenders are not subjected to unjust stops, searches, or arrests without reasonable cause.

== Criminal adjudication: discrimination by the criminal justice system ==
There is a common assumption and belief that criminal adjudication within the criminal justice system is biased, whereupon ethnicity, race and class not only predicts but foreshadows that criminal arrests are skewed. More specifically, this prediction is attributed to the concern that racial minorities (African American, Latinos, Etc.) and impoverished or poverty-stricken defendants tend to receive harsher judged sentences compared to White, Asian, and wealthier or more affluent defendants. One aspect to consider when examining research about potential biases and discrimination within the Criminal Justice System is the researcher’s possible expectancy effects, citation bias, negativity bias and an over interpretation of statistical noise. Since this discrimination is not always detected and recorded, information provided isn't always 100% accurate.

An act titled End Racial and Religious Profiling Act, stating that federal, state, and local law enforcement were prohibited from targeting people based on their race, ethnicity, national origin, or religion, was introduced in the 118th Congress by Senator Ben Cardin, but was not filed in the House. It has not yet been reintroduced in the 119th Congress.

=== Discrimination by the criminal justice system in Europe ===
Research suggests that police practices, such as racial profiling, over-policing in areas populated by minorities and in-group bias may result in disproportionately high numbers of racial minorities among crime suspects in Sweden, Italy, and England and Wales. According to the Racial Disparity Audit conducted by the United Kingdom Prime Minister, in 2017 minorities living in Wales and England were more than 3.5 times more likely to be arrested than whites. Likewise, this same group was far more likely to be the victims of crime with their white counterparts only having 15 percent likelihood. Research also suggests that there may be possible discrimination by the judicial system, which contributes to a higher number of convictions for racial minorities in Sweden, the Netherlands, Italy, Germany, Denmark and France.

=== Discrimination by the criminal justice system in the United States ===
Research suggests that police practices, such as racial profiling, over-policing in areas populated by minorities and in-group bias may result in disproportionately high numbers of racial minorities among crime suspects. Also, there may be possible discrimination by the judicial system, which contributes to a higher number of convictions for racial minorities. Recent research in 2024 shows that racial inequality in the U.S. criminal justice system is caused by more than just individual bias. Sociologist Hedwig Lee explains that racism is built into the system itself through patterns and policies that treat some groups as less valued. These factors work together to keep racial gaps in policing, courts, and prisons in place over time. On average, white offenders are less likely to be arrested for their crime than non-white offenders. Studies show that prosecutors are more likely to charge people that are a part of marginalized groups with more severe sentences than compared to white people.

== Racial disparities: relationship between inequality and crime ==
Racial inequality, resulting in increased disadvantages and imbalances that not only affect but overshadow the treatment of racial groups (such as racial minorities), has often been theorized to be a factor in the manifestation and explanation of crime. More specifically, the aspect that economic deprivation and economic hardships influenced the disparity in crime rates between Whites, Blacks and other racial minorities. Overall, a wide variety of explanations and research have focused on the effects of inequality (socially, economically, educationally), poverty and unemployment, structural disadvantages, inadequate economic resources, and social segregation and isolation.

=== Theoretical perspectives: theories, theses and dissertations ===
Early research into the effects of interracial economic inequality, economic hardships, economic deprivation and factors such as poverty and unemployment have contributed to a variety of theories, theses and dissertations. This includes, but is not limited to, the deprivation thesis, macrostructural theory of intergroup relations, interracial economic inequality thesis and the macro-social theory of social structure. One possible suggestion for racial inequality related to crime is that areas who had a higher population of enslaved people in the 1800s would ultimately have lasting racial prejudice embedded within these areas, leading to increased rates of racial profiling and biased court systems. U.S. policing and criminal justice system has historical roots in slavery and colonization, such as slave patrols, Black Codes, and Jim Crowe Laws that criminalized freed Black people, creating a pre-existing bias towards African American. The following theories affects on these factors:

- Majority Minority Theory: policing intensity increases in minority majority areas with socioeconomic disadvantages.
- Conflict Theory of Law: policing backs dominant or majority group interests.
- Minority Threat Hypothesis: as minority presence or power increases, law enforcement responds with more control and aggressive strategies.

=== Research and studies ===
When considering the research and studies that have been focused on the statistical rates and notable differences between race and crime, it is important to understand possible underlying issues, assumptions or biases that may occur. For example, previous studies have attempted to obtain statistical rates by disaggregating crime rates or employing race specific crime rates. However, this was shown to result in an overrepresentation of specific racial groups such as blacks and other racial minorities (including both delinquents and adults). Other prior (and even current) studies have also utilized data such as victimization data, homicide data, and violent crimes. However, some of these approaches had limitations, resulting in overrepresentation or incorrect assumptions. Possible limitations to consider are the utilization of only one measurement of discrimination or race-crime statistics, the omission of information or facts, and relying on subsets and overtly broad information and data sets.

In 2020 Black Americans were 9.3 times more likely than White Americans to be homicide victims, American Indians 4.3 times, and Latin individuals 1.9 times, based on age-adjusted data. Since, homicide tends to be intraracial, these numbers highlight higher rates of offending inside the same racial groups. However, other sources present data distracting from these figures. According to data in 2023, police shooting stats showed about four in ten individuals shot by officers were White, while about one in five were Black and around one in eight were Hispanic. Another report from the same year over victims of violent crimes, was found to be mostly White at around 62%, Black individuals represented around 12%, Hispanic individuals 17%, and Asian, American Indian, and Alaska Native individuals making up about 4%. More recent data on arrests for violent offenses present that approximately 53% of people arrested were White, 25% were Black, and 14% were Hispanic. This expresses the demographic differences between victimization and arrest rates.

In a graph published by the Office of Juvenile Justice and Delinquency Prevention, the overall detention rate for juveniles has gone down since the 1990s; however, the rate of detention for Black, Hispanic, and Indigenous youth is still shown as significantly higher compared to white youth. In an additional graph published by the OJJDP, the rate of youth arrest rates shows similar results, with Black and Indigenous youth once again facing higher rates than white youth.

Currently, one of the tools utilized is the NIBRS database which has assisted with obtaining a more accurate analysis. This was due to an increase in variety and improved measure of crime. However, conflicting research and findings have brought to light a multitude of potential limitations to the available documentation, records and data that is available for use in race-crime specific data. Interpretation of these studies and research conducted have resulted in a variety of narratives and outcomes due to mixed results, a lack of studies for racial groups such as Asians, and even aspects such as expectancy effects and biases (such as negativity bias).

== See also ==
- Crime in the United States
- Decarceration in the United States
- Electronic monitoring in the United States
- Hate crime
- Immigration and crime
- Incarceration in the United States
- Race and crime in the United States
- Race and the war on drugs
- Race and inequality in the United States
- Racial profiling
- Racism in the United States
- Sex differences in crime
- Statistical correlations of criminal behaviour
