= Hamilton Project =

American economics policy program

The Hamilton Project is an economic policy initiative within the Brookings Institution. It was originally launched in April 2006 by a combination of public policy makers, business people, academic leaders, and other former Clinton administration economists and experts. The Hamilton Project "seeks to advance America's promise of opportunity, prosperity, and growth." It went dormant after U.S. President Barack Obama assumed office in 2009 because many of its members left to work for the White House; however it was relaunched in 2010 with Michael Greenstone as the new director.

The Hamilton Project is currently led by Wendy Edelberg, former Chief Economist at the Congressional Budget Office. Previous directors have included Jay Shambaugh, former Member of the White House Council of Economic Advisers and a professor of economics and international affairs at the George Washington University; Peter R. Orszag, former Director of the Office of Management and Budget in the Obama Administration; Jason Furman, professor of the practice of economic policy at the Harvard Kennedy School; Douglas W. Elmendorf, Dean of the Kennedy School at Harvard University; Michael Greenstone, a former chief economist for the President's Council of Economic Advisers; and Diane Whitmore Schanzenbach, director of the Institute for Policy Research at Northwestern University. The Hamilton Project hosts events and commissions evidence-based policy proposals, reports, and books on topics ranging through economic security, employment, poverty, education, health care, and innovation.
