= Sentencing disparity =

Form of unequal treatment

Sentencing disparity, or sentencing discrimination, is defined as "a form of unequal treatment in criminal punishment".

== Variation among judges ==
Two judges could be faced with a similar case in which one could order a very harsh sentence, and another would give a much lesser sentence. There is evidence that some US federal judges give much longer prison sentences for similar offenses than other judges do.

In 2005, Max Schanzenbach found that "increasing the proportion of female judges in a district decreases the sex disparity" in sentencing which he interprets as "evidence of a paternalistic bias among male judges that favors female offenders".

A 2020 study found with decreasing number of female judges in French courts, the gender gaps in prison and probation sentences is widened. Prison and probation sentences are lighter for women, and suspended prison sentences are longer. The gender of the prosecutor seems to play no role.

== By gender or sex ==
=== United States ===
A 2001 University of Georgia study found substantial sentencing discrimination against men "after controlling for extensive criminological, demographic, and socioeconomic variables". The study found that in US federal courts, "males are... less likely to get no prison term when that option is available; less likely to receive downward departures [from the guidelines]; and more likely to receive upward adjustments and, conditioned on having a downward departure, receive smaller reductions than ... females".

In 2006, Ann Martin Stacey and Cassia Spohn found that women receive more lenient sentences than men after controlling for presumptive sentence, family responsibilities, offender characteristics, and other legally relevant variables, based on examination of three US district courts.

In 2012 Sonja B. Starr from University of Michigan Law School found that controlling for the crime, "men receive 63% longer sentences on average than women do" that and women are “twice as likely to avoid incarceration if convicted", also based on data from US federal court cases.

Natalie Goulette and her colleagues found 2014 support for the “evil woman” theory, which suggests that chivalry is reserved for certain groups of women, which appear to be docile and in need of protection.

In 2019, The Guardian claimed that outdated data on sentencing disparity have been widely cited, such as a 2006 ACLU article stating that the average prison sentence was two to six years for men who killed their female partners and 15 years for women who killed their male partners. The claim was repeated by Women's March organization and by the journalist Mona Eltahawy. ACLU stated the source of the information was National Coalition Against Domestic Violence. 1989. The Bureau of Justice Statistics report on intimate partner violence from that period indicated that a higher proportion of female prisoners convicted of violence against their intimate partners received life sentences or the death penalty (33%), compared to male prisoners who were convicted of similar offenses (19%). Additionally, that proportion was also higher than that of female prisoners who committed violent crimes against non-intimate individuals (22%).

=== United Kingdom ===
A paper examining gender sentencing disparities in a large samples of assault, burglary, and drugs offences found that male offenders are subjected to significantly harsher sentences, even after controlling for mitigating factors and case characteristics. Men were 2.84 times more likely than women to receive custodial sentence for the offence of assault, 1.89 more likely for the offence of burglary, and 2.72 more likely for offence related to drugs. For offences of assault, the gender factor was stronger than any other "harm and culpability" factor with the exception of the "with intent to commit serious harm" factor.

=== France ===
A 2020 study showed that women received 33% (15 days) shorter prison sentences than men, even after controlling for all observable characteristics, including a very precise description of the crime. When pairs of mixed-gender offender were convicted together, the gender gap was even higher: men receive 38.7 additional prison days and 10.7 fewer suspended prison days.

From a procedural point of view, when controlling for the type of crime, men were on average judged after shorter investigations and were more likely to be sentenced after an accelerated procedure. When taken to court, men were 20% less likely to be discharged (6% vs. 4%). In 2017, 19.9% of convicted men were sentenced to prison, compared to 8.5% of convicted women.

== By race ==
=== United States ===
A 2001 University of Georgia study found substantial sentencing racism against African Americans "after controlling for extensive criminological, demographic, and socioeconomic variables". The study found that in US federal courts, "blacks... less likely to get no prison term when that option is available; less likely to receive downward departures [from the guidelines]; and more likely to receive upward adjustments and, conditioned on having a downward departure, receive smaller reductions than whites".

A 2023 study found for grand juries in the USA a "small but statistically significant disparate impact on Black defendants", but no taste-based discrimination or statistical discrimination between black and white races based on data from a quarter million felony cases.

== Equality versus equity ==
Some have argued for sentencing disparity because of social equity or substantive equality for race and gender. In 2016, Mirko Bagaric argued that African-Americans and Indigenous Australians should receive a sentencing discount in all but the most serious crimes, in part to offset unacknowledged biases to the opposite effect, and that women should "be treated more leniently when they commit the same crime as a man" and not have any exception for serious offending.

In the United Kingdom, Jean Corston's 2007 report planned as a "review of women with particular vulnerabilities in the criminal justice system" is described as making the case "that prisons should be scrapped for all but a tiny number of women". Corston that justified on the basis "equality does not mean treating everyone the same" (social equality and formal equality). She proposed, "Custodial sentences for women must be reserved for serious and violent offenders who pose a threat to the public". Also, she thought that overt separate sentencing for men and women could be considered after then-pending equality legislation.

In 2024, Secretary of State for Justice Shabana Mahmood unveiled plans to decrease the number of women in jail, close women’s prisons, or convert them to male prisons to tackle an overcrowding crisis. For that purpose, Mahmood planned to establish a new public body, the Women’s Justice Board, and to increase prison alternatives for women such as community sentences and residential women’s centres.

Some legal commentators and men's rights activists argue that giving women lighter sentences than men is infantilizing, based on stereotyping, and incompatible with gender equality.

== See also ==
- Ambivalent sexism
- Bias of jurors
- Focal concerns theory
- Institutional discrimination
- Judicial discretion
- Judicial misconduct
- Hate crime
- Millet (Ottoman Empire)
- Selective enforcement
- Selective prosecution
- Religious law
- Women-are-wonderful effect
