= California Values Act =

2017 California state law

California State Legislature
- Full name: California Senate Bill 54
- Introduced: December 6, 2017
- Assembly voted: September 15, 2017
- Senate voted: September 16, 2017
- Signed into law: October 5, 2017
- Sponsor: Kevin de León
- Governor: Jerry Brown
- Code: Health and Safety
- Website: leginfo.legislature.ca.gov/faces/billTextClient.xhtml?bill_id=201720180SB54

Status: Current legislation

2017 California Senate Bill 54, commonly referred to as "SB 54" and also known as the "California Values Act" is a 2017 California state law that prevents state and local law enforcement agencies from using their resources on behalf of federal immigration enforcement agencies. The law allows for cooperation between local, state and federal law enforcement in cases of violent illegal immigrants, and is often referred to as a "sanctuary law" due to its resemblance of sanctuary jurisdiction policies.

According to a 2020 study, the law had no significant impact on violent and property crime rates in California.

A legal challenge by the federal government was unsuccessful in the Ninth Circuit Court of Appeals. The Supreme Court declined to hear the case.

== Background ==
The bill was passed as a response to Executive Order 13768, President Trump's initiative to oppose sanctuary cities and other jurisdictions that refuse to collaborate with federal immigration authorities, and to his stepped up deportations of illegal immigrants.

The bill was introduced by State Senate President Kevin de Leon. The bill passed the Senate on September 16, 2017 27–11 on a party-line vote, with all Democrats voting in favor and all Republicans voting against. The bill passed the Assembly 51–26 on September 15, 2017, with all Republicans and three Democrats voting against. Governor Jerry Brown signed the bill after its passage.

== Provisions ==
The Sanctuary Law, a sequel to the 2013 state law called the California Trust Act, is designed to prevent local law enforcement agencies from detaining undocumented immigrants who are eligible for deportation by the U.S. Immigration and Customs Enforcement (ICE) for violating immigration laws except in cases where the undocumented immigrants have been convicted of serious or violent felonies, or of misdemeanors that can be classified as such felonies. Such policies have been in place in many California cities and counties for decades.

== Political impact ==
The law has received both significant support and opposition. An online poll conducted by UC Berkeley in April 2018 found that 56% of voters support the law and 41% oppose it.

In March 2018, the U.S. Department of Justice filed a lawsuit against the state of California, alleging that SB 54 and other laws aimed at reducing cooperation in the state with federal immigration authorities were unconstitutional. The lawsuit was dismissed in July 2018 by judge John Mendez of the United States District Court for the Eastern District of California, stating in his opinion that "The Court does not find any indication in the cited federal statutes that Congress intended for States to have no oversight over detention facilities operating within their borders."

The bill was a significant issue during the 2018 elections.

The December 2018 killing of Ronil Singh re-inflamed debate over the new law, with some claiming that the law prevented the perpetrator from being deported before the murder took place. Governor Brown has denied that Singh's murder by an illegal immigrant had anything to do with California's new sanctuary law.

Also in December 2018, an undocumented immigrant who had twice been deported, but who had returned to the United States illegally, was arrested on a misdemeanor charge but released under the new sanctuary law, and then embarked on a 24-hour shooting spree in Tulare County, killing two and injuring seven, before crashing his car and dying. Sheriff Mike Boudreaux shifted blame away from his department onto ICE and California SB54 (2017). The sheriff told the press that a "tool has been removed from our hands," and that, because the county could not turn the shooter over to ICE for deportation unless ICE had issued an arrest warrant, which they had not. He continued, "our county was shot up by a violent criminal."

Several cities and local governments in California declared their opposition to the state's sanctuary policies and passed ordinances to that effect. Most of these ordinances are symbolic however, some have joined the Trump administration's lawsuit against California.

On February 21, 2025, State Senate Minority Leader Brian Jones and other Southern California Republicans including Gubernatorial Candidate Chad Bianco held a press conference in San Diego to announce a proposed bill "Safety Before Criminal Sanctuary" (SB554) that would weaken SB54. Protesters in attendance included members of the SEIU United Service Workers West and the American Friends Service Committee.

== See also ==
- Illegal immigration to the United States and crime
- Immigration policy of Donald Trump
