= Focal concerns theory =

Criminological theory

In criminology, the focal concerns theory, posited in 1962 by Walter B. Miller, attempts to explain the behavior of "members of adolescent street corner groups in lower class communities" as concern for six focal concerns: trouble, toughness, smartness, excitement, fate, and autonomy. Miller described these focal concerns as "areas or issues which command widespread and persistent attention and a high degree of emotional involvement." Miller's theory, as it is often referred to, views these criminogenic influences as a learned part of the lower-class subculture values. In essence, the theory suggests that delinquency is part of the learned cultural values rather than an anomic reaction to unattainable goals.

== See also ==
- Core values
- David Matza
- Sentencing disparity
- Social values
- Uncertainty avoidance

== Bibliography ==
- Cohen, Albert. Delinquent Boys (New York: Free press, 1995) pg. 19–25
- Miller, Walter. "Lower-class Culture as a Generating Milieu of Gang Delinquency", Journal of Social Issues 14 (1958): 5–19
- Flowers, Barri R. The Adolescent Criminal: An Examination of Today's Juvenile Offender. McFarland & Company, Inc. 108–109
