= Diane Schanzenbach =

American economist

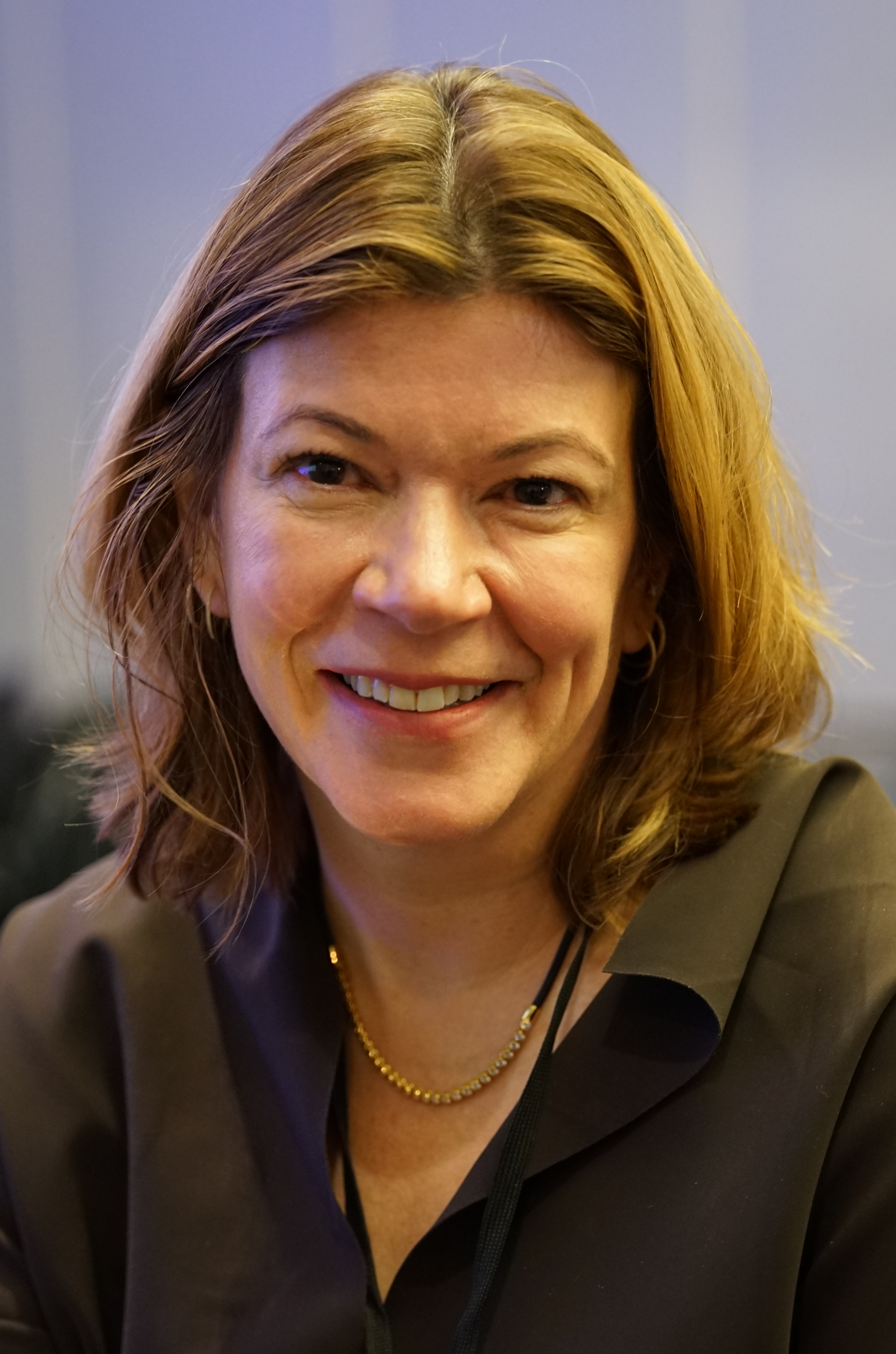
- Schanzenbach at ASSA 2026
- Born: Diane Miriam Whitmore; 1972 (age 53–54); St. Louis, Missouri, U.S.
- Spouse: Max Schanzenbach

Academic background
- Education: Wellesley College (BA); Princeton University (PhD)

Academic work
- Discipline: Economic policy
- Institutions: Northwestern University

Diane Whitmore Schanzenbach (born 1972 as Diane Miriam Whitmore) is an American economist who studies the effects of policies aimed at alleviating child poverty, such as the Supplemental Nutrition Assistance Program (SNAP). She works at Northwestern University as Professor of Human Development and Social Policy at their School of Education and Social Policy. She is also the director of Northwestern's Institute for Policy Research and the Brookings Institution's Hamilton Project, as well as a senior fellow at the Brookings Institution.

== Education and career ==
Schanzenbach received her bachelor's degree in religion and economics magna cum laude from Wellesley College in 1995, and her Ph.D. in economics from Princeton University in 2002. Before joining the faculty of Northwestern, she taught at the University of Chicago's Harris School of Public Policy and served as a Robert Wood Johnson Foundation postdoctoral scholar at the University of California, Berkeley.

== Honors and awards ==
Schanzenbach is a research associate at the National Bureau of Economic Research and a visiting scholar at the Federal Reserve Bank of Chicago. In 2013, she received the annual Raymond Vernon Memorial Prize for the best paper published in the Journal of Policy Analysis and Management.

== Personal life ==
Schanzenbach is married to Max Schanzenbach, a professor at Northwestern University School of Law. In 2012, they moved to North Shore neighborhood of Chicago, Illinois with their three children named Daniel, Peter, and Amy.
