= Harry Levine (sociologist) =

American sociologist and criminologist

- Born: April 1, 1945 (age 81)
- Education: Brandeis University; University of California, Berkeley
- Known for: Marijuana arrests
- Awards: Senior Scholar Distinguished Achievement Award from the Society for the Study of Social Problems (2013)
- Scientific career
- Fields: Sociology
- Workplaces: Queens College; Graduate Center, CUNY
- Thesis: Demon of the Middle Class: Self Control, Liquor, and the Ideology of Temperance in 19th Century America (1969)
- Doctoral advisor: David Matza

Harry Gene Levine (born April 1, 1945) is an American sociologist known for his research on alcohol and illicit drugs in American society. He is a professor of sociology at Queens College and the Graduate Center, CUNY. His work has included studies on marijuana arrests in New York City, which have found that such arrests are more common there than in any other city in the world, and that they were much more common from 1998 to 2007 than from 1988 to 1997. He has also found that over the 15 years leading up to 2011, far more of those arrested in New York City for marijuana possession were black (54%) than were Latino (33%) or white (12%). Levine's research has also found that during the period from 2002 to 2010, under the mayoralty of Michael Bloomberg, marijuana arrests by the NYPD increased significantly, and 87% of those arrested for marijuana were black or Hispanic.
