= Act of Love (politics) =

Phrase used by American politician Jeb Bush

Act of Love is a phrase used by American politician Jeb Bush to describe the act of immigrating illegally to the United States for the purpose of improving a family's economic condition, and also a U.S. political advertisement released by the 2016 presidential campaign of Donald Trump as part of an attack on Bush's approach to illegal immigration to the United States.

== Background ==
Bush made the statement in answer to a question put by a reporter during a celebration of the 25th anniversary of the presidency of his father, George H. W. Bush, held at the George Bush Presidential Library in April 2014. During the August 6, 2015 Republican presidential debate, when moderator Chris Wallace asked Bush if he stood by this statement, Bush responded, "I do. I believe that the great majority of people coming here illegally have no other option. They want to provide for their family." He added that "there should be a path to earned legal status" for illegal immigrants.

The advertisement, released in August 2015, attacked Bush by playing a tape of Bush defending illegal entry into the U.S. by undocumented migrants as "an act of love." In the ad, mugshots of illegal immigrants who committed violent crimes in the U.S. alternate with footage of Bush saying, "Yeah, they broke the law, but it's not a felony.... It's an act of love."

It is regarded by a number of commentators as having been a crucial turning point in the failure of the Bush candidacy.

== Response to advertisement ==
The ad attracted comparisons to the 1988 "Willie Horton" advertisement, "one of the most notorious political attacks in recent decades."

=== Role in 2016 campaign ===
The phrase is regarded as having played a role in the withdrawal of Bush's candidacy.

Looking back on the event months later, The Weekly Standard called "Act of Love" a "gonzo web video" and "Trump's first truly effective ad" and said that it "pointed out that the debate in which Bush defended illegal immigrants took place just a month after the killing of Kathryn Steinle in San Francisco by an illegal immigrant who had been deported multiple times." The ad features an image of Juan Francisco Lopez-Sanchez, the sole suspect in that killing.

According to The Washington Post, "[n]o candidate in the race was prepared for GOP voters' opposition to immigration, with the exception of Trump", and the anti-illegal-immigration sentiment tapped by Trump contributed to Bush's defeat. According to Eric Fehrnstrom, a Republican political analyst and media strategist, Bush's response to the question put to him about this statement during the August 2015 Republican presidential debate marked a crucial turning point in the campaign for the Republican nomination. Looking back on the campaign, conservative political analyst Michael Barone considers the Trump's two-pronged attack on Bush in the August Republican primary debate, for the "act of love" position on illegal immigration and for being weak, as a key moment in Trump's political rise.

=== Impact of ad on campaign media ===
The San Francisco Chronicle described the ad, together with Bush's attacks on Trump, as pivotal in transforming Instagram from a personal photo-sharing app that some celebrities and politicians used to enhance their images into a campaign tool.
