= Remembrance Project =

US anti-illegal immigration organization

The Remembrance Project
- Founder: Maria Espinoza
- Location: Houston, Texas, United States
- Origins: 2009
- Website: theremembranceproject.org trp-usa.org

The Remembrance Project is an anti-illegal immigration American non-profit organization based in Houston, Texas. The Project maintains a list of American citizens killed by illegal immigrants in the United States and works to draw attention to the victims of such crimes.

It was praised by President Donald Trump, and members of the group frequently joined Trump during the 2016 United States presidential campaign.

== History ==
The Remembrance Project was founded in 2009 by conservative anti-illegal-immigration activist Maria Espinoza, whose father immigrated to the United States legally.

During the 2016 United States presidential election, members of the Remembrance Project joined candidate Donald Trump at rallies. On January 25, 2017, President Trump thanked the organization for their good work.

The Southern Poverty Law Center has criticized Espinoza for "helping to advance the agenda of the organized nativist movement in the United States, which is to demonize immigrants in general, whether documented or not", for calling crime committed by illegal immigrants an "epidemic" and for appearing on the front cover of The Social Contract which it calls a racist journal. Espinoza has supported a "catch an illegal immigrant" game on the campus of University of Texas at Austin, and claimed that "Child molestation and rape are very numerous in this illegal alien demographic!"

== See also ==
- Illegal immigration to the United States
- Illegal immigrant population of the United States
- Immigration and crime
- Office of Victims of Immigration Crime Engagement
- Angel Families
- Illegal immigration to the United States and crime
