= Max Schanzenbach =

American legal scholar and law professor

Max M. Schanzenbach is an American legal scholar and the Seigle Family Professor of Law at the Northwestern University School of Law in Chicago, United States.

== Education ==
Schanzenbach received his JD from Yale Law School and his PhD in economics from Yale University.

== Career ==
Schanzenbach joined the Northwestern University faculty in 2003 as an assistant professor of law. He was named the Benjamin Mazur Professor of Law there in 2006. In the Spring of 2008, he was the Bruce W. Nichols Visiting professor of law at Harvard Law School. Since 2012, he has been the co-editor-in-chief of the American Law and Economics Review.

== Work ==
A 2007 study co-authored by Schanzenbach and Robert H. Sitkoff argued that trustees responded appropriately to the introduction of so-called prudent investor laws. Also in 2007, Schanzenbach and Emerson Tiller (who is also a professor at Northwestern) co-authored a study showing that judges appointed by Republicans tend to give harsher sentences for street crime, while those appointed by Democrats tend to punish white-collar criminals more severely. Schanzenbach has also argued that police union contracts are serious impediments to creating incentives for proper police conduct, including the contract made by the union representing officers in the Chicago Police Department.

== Personal life ==
Schanzenbach is married to Diane Whitmore Schanzenbach, a professor at the Northwestern University School of Education and Social Policy, with whom he has three children. As of 2015, they live in the North Shore area of Chicago, Illinois.
