= Walter B. Miller =

American anthropologist (1920–2004)

Walter B. Miller (1920–2004) was an American anthropologist and was known for his study and publications on youth gangs.

== Biography ==
=== Early life ===
Walter Benson Miller was born February 7, 1920, in Philadelphia and died March 28, 2004, in Cambridge, Massachusetts. He was a Phi Beta Kappa (1948) graduate of the University of Chicago with an M.A. in anthropology, and of Harvard University with a Ph.D. in social relations. He lived and studied with the Fox Indians of Iowa as part of the University of Chicago, Department of Anthropology, Fox Indian Applied Anthropology Project from 1948 to 1953 under Clyde Kluckhohn. Miller worked with James Q. Wilson and Daniel Patrick Moynihan at the Harvard-MIT Joint Center for Urban Studies in the 1960s.

=== Career ===
Miller was director of Boston's Roxbury Gang Delinquency Research Project for the United States Department of Health, Education, and Welfare's National Institute of Mental Health from 1957 to 1964. Miller, a jazz, blues and bluegrass musician, found that his knowledge of and interest in music helped him establish rapport with gang youth.

He published numerous papers from that project, including his major theoretical contribution, one of the most frequently cited papers in criminological literature, "Lower Class Subculture as a Generating Milieu of Gang Delinquency." Unlike other theories of youth gangs, Miller saw gang members as essentially normal youth who were trying to achieve belonging and status according to the criteria of their own lower and working class, as opposed to middle class, communities.

From 1974 to 1980, Miller served as Project Director of the National Youth Gang Survey, the first national survey of violence by youth gangs and groups for the National Institute of Juvenile Justice and Delinquency Prevention based at Harvard Law School's Center for Criminal Justice. He was instrumental in founding the National Youth Gang Center. Until his death, he served as an Adjunct Research Consultant for the Institute for Intergovernmental Research (IIR) in Tallahassee, FL, overseeing research for the National Youth Gang Center Project of the Office of Juvenile Justice and Delinquency Prevention, U.S. Department of Justice.

== Major works ==
Miller, Walter B.1958 Lower Class Culture as a Generating Milieu of Gang Delinquency. Journal of Social Issues 14, no. 3:5–19.

Miller, Walter B. 2001. The Growth of Youth Gang Problems in the United States: 1970-98 : Report. Diane Pub Co. (ISBN 978-0-7567-1616-5)

== Personal life ==
Miller was known in the Boston area as a traditional jazz trumpet player, vocalist, and member of the Blue Horizon Jazz Band. Miller died at his home in Cambridge, Massachusetts, on March 28, 2004.
