= Barry Latzer =

Barry Latzer (born 1945) is an American criminologist and emeritus professor of criminal justice at the John Jay College of Criminal Justice. He previously taught at the Graduate Center, CUNY. He also prosecuted and defended accused criminals while teaching both there and at John Jay. In 2016, his book The Rise and Fall of Violent Crime in America was published by Encounter Books. In 2021, The Roots of Violent Crime in America: From the Gilded Age through the Great Depression was published by LSU Press. In 2022, his book The Myth of Overpunishment: A Defense of the American Justice System and a Proposal to Reduce Incarceration While Protecting the Public was published by Republic Book Publishers. He has been called an "expert on core curricula" and has lectured and written on capital punishment and on state constitutional criminal procedure law.

Latzer worked as an Assistant District Attorney in Brooklyn, New York from 1985 to 1986, as a member of the Indigent Defendants Appeals Panel in Manhattan from 1987 to 1990, and as a Senior Consultant for the American Council of Trustees and Alumni from 2003 to 2005. Latzer was a member of the board of trustees of the National Association of Scholars from 2004 to 2017 and a co-founder and member of the executive committee of the CUNY Association of Scholars from 1997 to 2003.

Barry Latzer has also appeared on TV programs and podcasts being interviewed and discussing his books.

== Education ==
Latzer received his Ph.D. in political science from the University of Massachusetts, Amherst in 1977, and his J.D. from Fordham University in 1985.

== Books ==
- State Constitutions and Criminal Justice (Greenwood Press, 1991)
- State Constitutional Criminal Law (Clark, Boardman, Callaghan, 1995)
- Death Penalty Cases (Butterworth-Heinemann, 200)
- The Rise and Fall of Violent Crime in America (Encounter Books, 2016)
- The Roots of Violent Crime in America: From the Gilded Age through the Great Depression (LSU Press, 2021)
- The Myth of Overpunishment: A Defense of the American Justice System and a Proposal to Reduce Incarceration While Protecting the Public. Description. (Republic Book Publishers, 2022)

== Other writing ==
- "Don't Call Rioters 'Protesters'" (commentary) (subscription required), The Wall Street Journal, June 4, 2020; for context, the WSJ lead online news headline the same day was "Protesters Gather to Memorialize George Floyd" (subscription required).
