= Immigration policy in Texas =

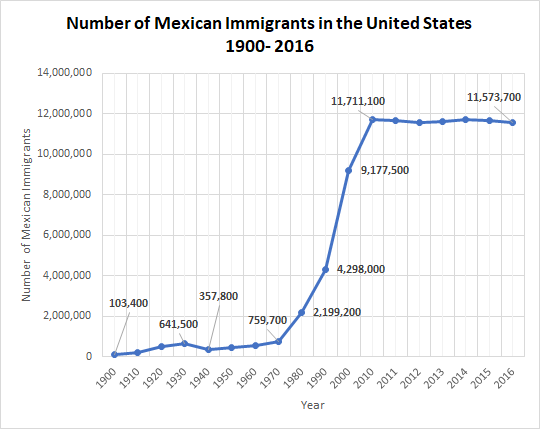
Trend of Mexican migration to the United States, 1900 - 2016

The state of Texas has a long history of immigration and immigration policy. The region that is now Texas was originally home to several Native American tribes. The first European immigrants arrived in the 1600s when the land was colonized by the French and the Spanish. Financial incentives created by the Mexican government brought many immigrants to Mexican Texas in the 1820s, mostly from slaveholding areas in the southern United States. This continued as significant illegal immigration to Mexico after 1830, when American migrants were banned.

The next wave of immigrants arrived in the mid-1980s, prompted by the passage of the Immigration Reform and Control Act. By 2022, there were over 5.17 million foreign-born people in the State of Texas.

Immigration is a major topic in American politics and was a key issue for President Donald Trump. Despite a decrease in the rate of immigration, recent policies have attempted to limit immigration to Texas and restrict legal protections for migrants. The United States federal government regulates the international border and has primary enforcement power for immigration law. State and local governments can choose whether to cooperate with federal law enforcement, and what services to provide to legal and illegal immigrants.

== History of immigration in Texas ==
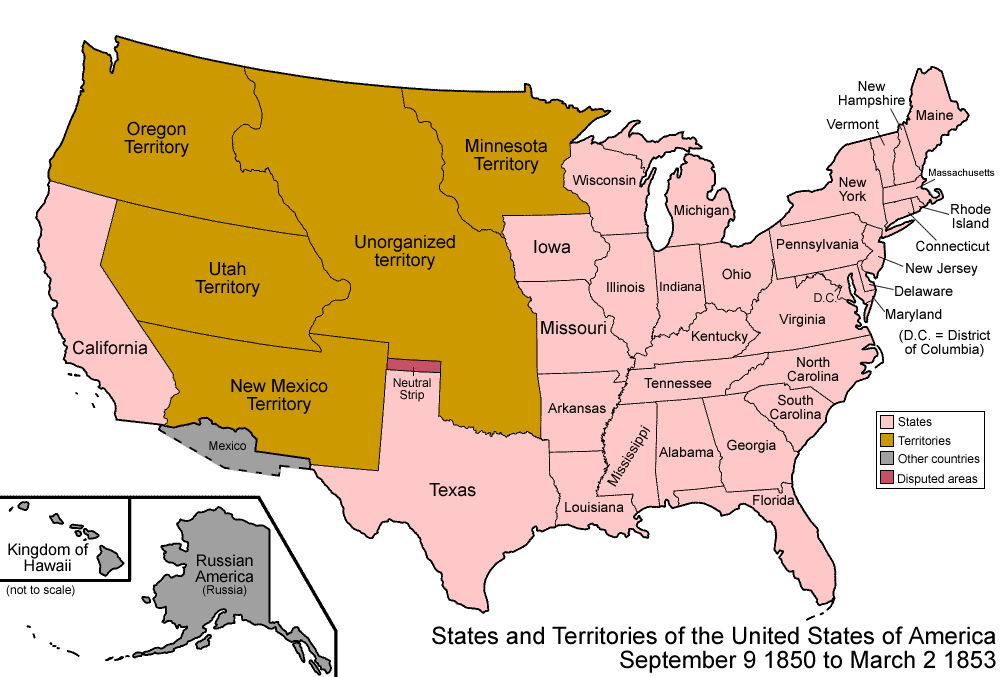
Borders of US states and territories 1850-1853

=== Brief history of Texas ===
Long before Texas became a state, several Native American tribes lived in the region. The Caddo, Lipan Apache, Karankawa, Jumano, Tonkawa, and Coahuiltecan people were some of the first inhabitants. The land was settled by the French and the Spaniards beginning in the 1600s, and the conquistadors and missionaries who arrived from Europe greatly changed the Native Americans' ways of life. The Spaniards claimed the largest amount of land and significantly influenced the culture of the region, the effects of which are still felt in Texas to this day.

In 1820, Mexico, which included present-day Texas, gained independence from Spain. After significant amounts of legal and illegal immigration from the southern United States generated political instability, Texas then declared independence from Mexico in 1836 and became the Republic of Texas, which was annexed by the United States in 1846 with the main purpose of continuing slavery. As a consequence of Texas leaving Mexico and joining the United States, many Mexican Americans never moved from their homes but lived in two nations, and there is a popular saying among Mexican Americans which states, "We didn't cross the border, the border crossed us." The current border of Texas was not established until the Compromise of 1850.

=== Background on immigration ===
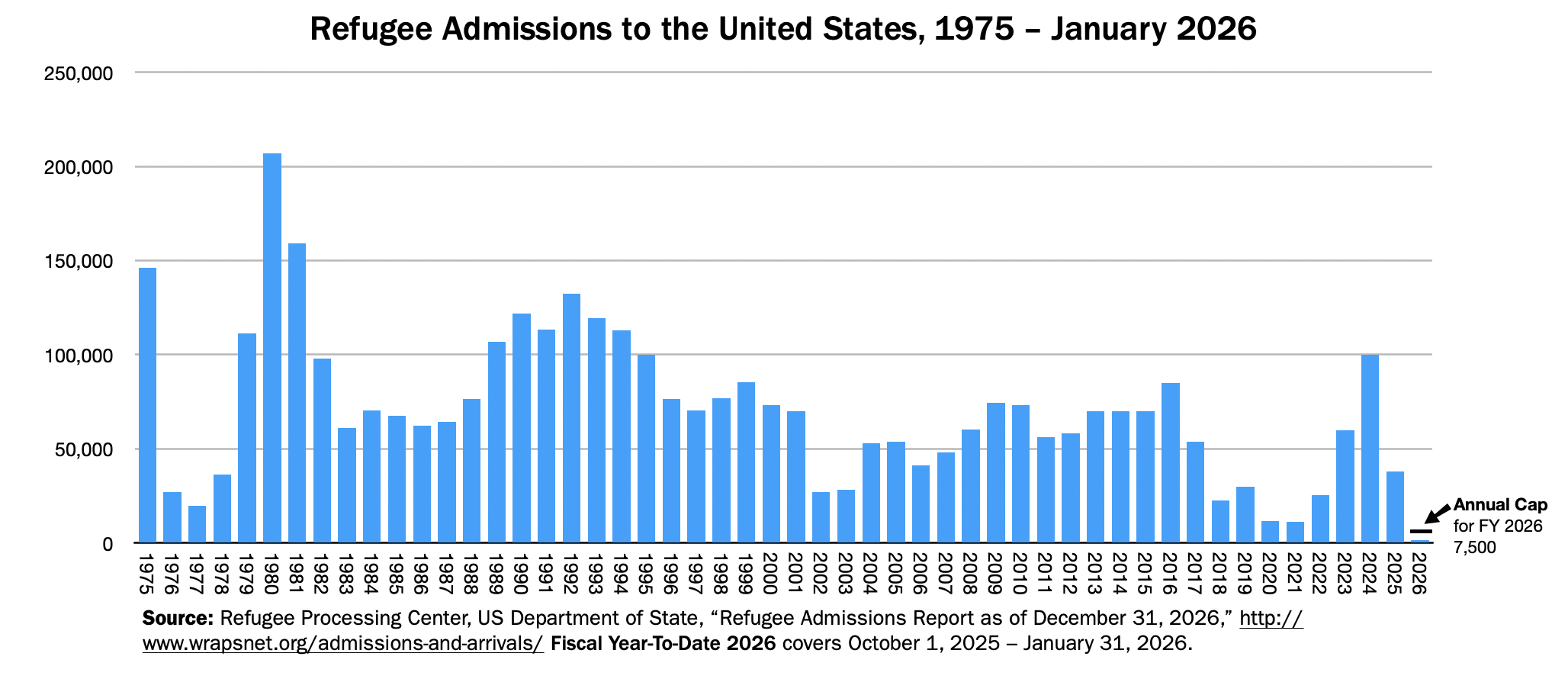
Refugee admissions, 1975 - 2019

The subject of immigration has always been a major issue in the United States and has become increasingly polarized over the last 20 years, with many stances on immigration criticized for being disconnected from their relevant statistics. The federal government of the United States is responsible for setting and enforcing most immigration policies, which determine who may become a new citizen or enter the country as a temporary resident, permanent resident, or refugee. However, states have the power to establish their own supplementary policies, allowing them to determine which public services immigrants can access, establish employee screening requirements, and guide interactions between related state agencies and their federal counterparts. For instance, some Texas jurisdictions have adopted policies that limit their cooperation with federal immigration enforcement. These jurisdictions are known as sanctuary jurisdictions. Once inside the United States legally, immigrants have freedom of movement between the states and may work anywhere if federally authorized (other than employer-specific visas).

Before 1970, Texas mainly attracted migrants who already lived in the United States, known as domestic migrants. Immigrants from Mexico would pass through Texas but would rarely stay and the foreign-born population in Texas hovered around 3%. However, during the 1980s immigration to Texas changed drastically as the state experienced an economic boom in the oil industry, which led more people to settle in the area, especially immigrants from Mexico. The foreign-born population increased to nearly 10% by the end of the decade. The passage of the Immigration Reform and Control Act (IRCA) in 1986 further encouraged immigrants to settle in Texas. The IRCA bolstered laws prohibiting the hiring of illegal immigrants but also made most of the illegal immigrants living in the United States legal immigrants. Many of those immigrants settled in Texas, bringing the foreign-born population of Texas to almost 17% by 2010.

As of 2022, Texas had a foreign-born population of 5,169,126 people, 63.5% of whom are of Latino origin The state has the second-largest population of immigrants in the United States and the second-highest number of Mexican immigrants in the United States. According to the American Immigration Council, one out of every six Texas residents is an immigrant and 15 percent of residents who are native-born U.S. citizens have at least one parent who is an immigrant. In 2015, over a third of all immigrants in Texas were naturalized U.S. citizens.

More recently, the immigrant population of the U.S. has been growing more slowly and new immigrants are increasingly of Asian descent and more educated than those of previous generations. The Mexican immigrant population has declined by half a million people since the beginning of the decade. In 2018, the United States ceded its status as the world's top country for resettling refugees when it was surpassed by Canada.

== Past policies ==
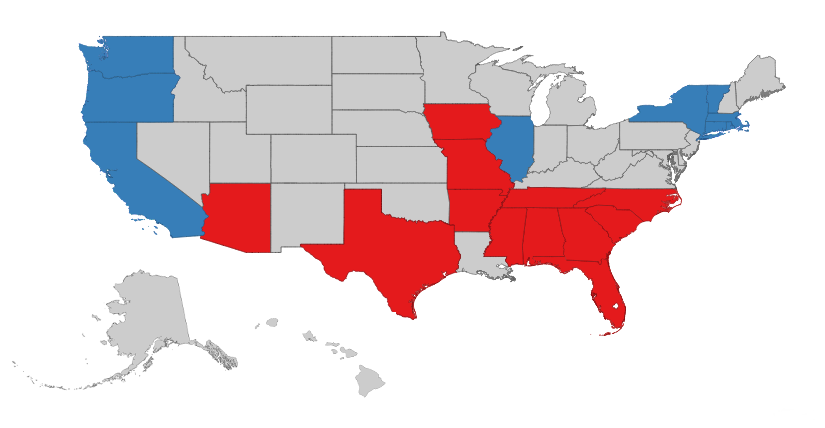
A map of U.S. states colored by their policy on sanctuary cities. Red: prohibits sanctuary cities. Blue: encourages sanctuary cities. Gray: no statewide policy.

=== Sanctuary cities ===
A sanctuary city is unofficially defined as a jurisdiction within a state that discourages cooperation with the federal government regarding the enforcement of immigration or abortion laws. These non-cooperation policies are enacted in an attempt to reduce fears of deportation and family break-up. For example, local law enforcement officers might refuse to detain non-citizen inmates for an additional 48 hours before releasing them as requested by the federal immigration authorities, in order to hamper the authorities' attempt to take them into federal custody. Multiple jurisdictions and cities in Texas were considered sanctuary cities before being banned by Texas Senate Bill 4.

=== Tent courts ===
President Trump established tent courts in the border towns of Brownsville and Laredo in September 2019 in an attempt to process the large number of migrants awaiting a trial. These courts provide shorter commutes for people waiting in Mexico and allow immigration judges in San Antonio to attend hearings virtually. People protested the secrecy surrounding the tent courts because Homeland Security would not allow reporters or the general public inside until January 2020. There were also complaints that people were being deprived of due process in the tent courts.

== Present policies ==
=== Senate Bill 4 ===
On May 7, 2017, Governor Greg Abbott signed a law that allowed law enforcement officers to ask about a person's immigration status if they had been arrested and detained. The law also banned sanctuary cities in the state and required local law enforcement officers to assist the federal government with immigration enforcement. On August 30, 2017, a judge for the United States District Court for the Western District of Texas approved a temporary injunction that prevented the law from going into effect until several lawsuits were resolved. However, the State of Texas appealed the injunction, and a ruling on September 25, 2017, by the United States Court of Appeals for the Fifth Circuit allowed Senate Bill 4 to remain in effect. Another ruling by the court on March 13, 2018, made an exception for the section of the bill that would punish officials who publicly endorse sanctuary city policies.

On March 19, 2024, the Supreme Court rejected, along liberal-conservative lines, a Biden Administration emergency request to temporarily prevent Texas from arresting migrants and attempting to deport them while the law was being challenged in court. On the same day, the full Fifth Circuit put a stay on enforcement, overturning the ruling of its own three-judge panel.

== Ongoing policies ==
=== Resettlement of refugees ===
On January 10, 2020, Governor Greg Abbott declared that Texas would not accept any refugees that year, making it the first state in the country to do so. This decision came after President Donald Trump gave local governments the ability to veto refugee resettlements in September 2019. Governor Abbott claimed that Texas had received more refugees than any other state, stating that 10% of all refugees in the United States had resettled in Texas over the past 10 years. On January 15, 2020, a federal judge blocked the executive order, ruling that individual states do not have the power to deny refugees entry and that doing so is not in the interest of the public. As such, Texas will continue to accept refugees unless the Trump administration chooses to appeal the decision, which it has not done as of January 2020.

=== Asylum law ===
Under U.S. federal law, a person seeking asylum must prove that they fear persecution from their native country and that this persecution would be based on race, religion, nationality, political views, or social groups. On January 25, 2018, President Trump passed the Migrant Protection Protocols, commonly known as the "Remain in Mexico" Program, which would send asylum seekers in the United States back to Mexico while they await their hearing. Seven ports of entries have implemented this program, four of which are in Texas: El Paso-Ciudad Juárez, Brownsville-Matamoros, Laredo-Nuevo Laredo, and Eagle Pass-Piedras Negras. The United States Court of Appeals for the Ninth Circuit halted the program in Arizona and California on March 4, 2020, ruling that the program violates United States law. However, the law remained in effect in the four ports in Texas. On March 11, 2020, the Supreme Court granted a temporary appeal that put a hold on the Ninth Circuit appeal and allowed the "Remain in Mexico" program to continue. A final ruling on the Migrant Protection Protocols Program is pending as of March 2020.

== Operation Lone Star ==
Operation Lone Star (OLS) is a joint operation between the Texas Department of Public Safety and the Texas Military Department along the US-Mexico border of southern Texas. Operation Lone Star has produced a lot of results when it comes to arrests, charges, apprehensions, and drug operations. Operation Lone Star was started in March 2021 by Governor Greg Abbott. The Texas National Guard and Texas Department of Public Safety were deployed to the southern border. Since the launch of Operation Lone Star in Texas:

• Over 494,400 illegal immigrant apprehensions • Over 38,100 criminal arrests • More than 34,600 felony charges • Over 453 million lethal doses of fentanyl seized

Cited from Operation Lone Star Ramps Up Historic Response to Biden's Border Crisis

Operation Lone Star has received $460,196 for border transportation funding, $55.4 million for border wall funding, and $102,689 for border security funding as of December 8, 2023 (Operation Lone Star). Since April 2022, Texas has transported over 12,500 migrants to Washington, D.C. Since August 2022, over 35,600 were transported to New York City and over 29,400 migrants to Chicago. There were over 3,400 migrants sent to Philadelphia since November 2022, 15,000 to Denver since May 18, and over 1,400 to Los Angeles since June 14 of this year (Operation Lone Star...). Texas has sent migrants to sanctuary cities by bus and by planes. OLS has used over $4.5 million and is facing charges of civil rights abuse (Operation Lone Star: A Costly...). This operation costs Texas taxpayers nearly $20 million a week and is channeling money out of important state programs (Operation Lone Star: A Costly...).

== See also ==
- Illegal immigration to the United States
- Illegal immigration to Mexico
- Texas Senate Bill 4
- Texas Statutes
- Immigration Legislation
