= Immigration enforcement in Ohio =

Immigration enforcement has been an evolving topic over many years. Throughout each presidential term there has been a different approach to immigration. In recent years, the most action taken to this topic has been from the Trump administration due to this being one of his campaigns primary concerns. During Trump's first presidential term, his administration made 472 immigration related changes to policies. Now during Trump's second presidential term, even more policies and orders have been enacted creating stricter enforcements on immigration 3. By the means of these policies, the extent of enforcement is in the state's power which leads to different participation levels throughout the county. This leads to "sanctuary cities" where they choose not to cooperate with these policies as they are supposed to. These "sanctuary cities" are present throughout all different states including Ohio.

In the state of Ohio, these federal policies have been adopted and have shifted their approach to the topic of immigration enforcement. Ohio has leaned towards republican which has led state lawmakers to support these policies. This has also led to bills being made and attempting to get passed that will align and help the expansion of these federal policies in state. Though the state has taken action to align with the Trump administration, there are cities and counties spread throughout Ohio fighting back. These "sanctuary cities" have taken action in many different ways and continue to.

== Federal policy and immigration ==
The Supreme Court has consistently ruled that the federal government has complete and exclusive power over immigration enforcement in the United States. However, individual states can determine how illegal immigrants are treated within their state. Additionally, states have shown to moderate their level of cooperation with immigration enforcement operations based on their views on immigration. "Sanctuary cities", such as Boston, Los Angeles, and Chicago, are specific municipalities that implement policies made to protect illegal immigrants, and limit local law enforcement from cooperating with federal immigration enforcement. The federal government, and the current Trump Administration, has taken legal action against uncooperative states, issuing executive orders and even threatening to withhold federal funds.

Executive Order 14159

The Trump administration has enacted multiple executive order actions directed at preventing or managing illegal immigration. Executive Order 14159 expands the use of "expedited removal", allowing for higher levels of deportation without a full immigration hearing. Furthermore, the order denies federal funding to sanctuary cities in order to pressure cities to comply with stricter immigration enforcement requirements. Additionally, the order institutes criminal and civil offenses for immigrants that fail to register as undocumented.

Migrant Protection Protocols

Another policy reinforced by the Trump administration are the Migrant Protection Protocols, or "Remain in Mexico" policies. This law lengthens the immigration process by requiring immigrant asylum seekers to remain in Mexico instead of being let into the US. Additionally, the policy limits parole policies and humanitarian involvement, such as shutting down CBP One, a program designed to increase ease of access towards asylum seekers. Finally, the policy makes it more difficult to claim asylum by modifying protections that previously allowed immigrants from dangerous situations to seek asylum.

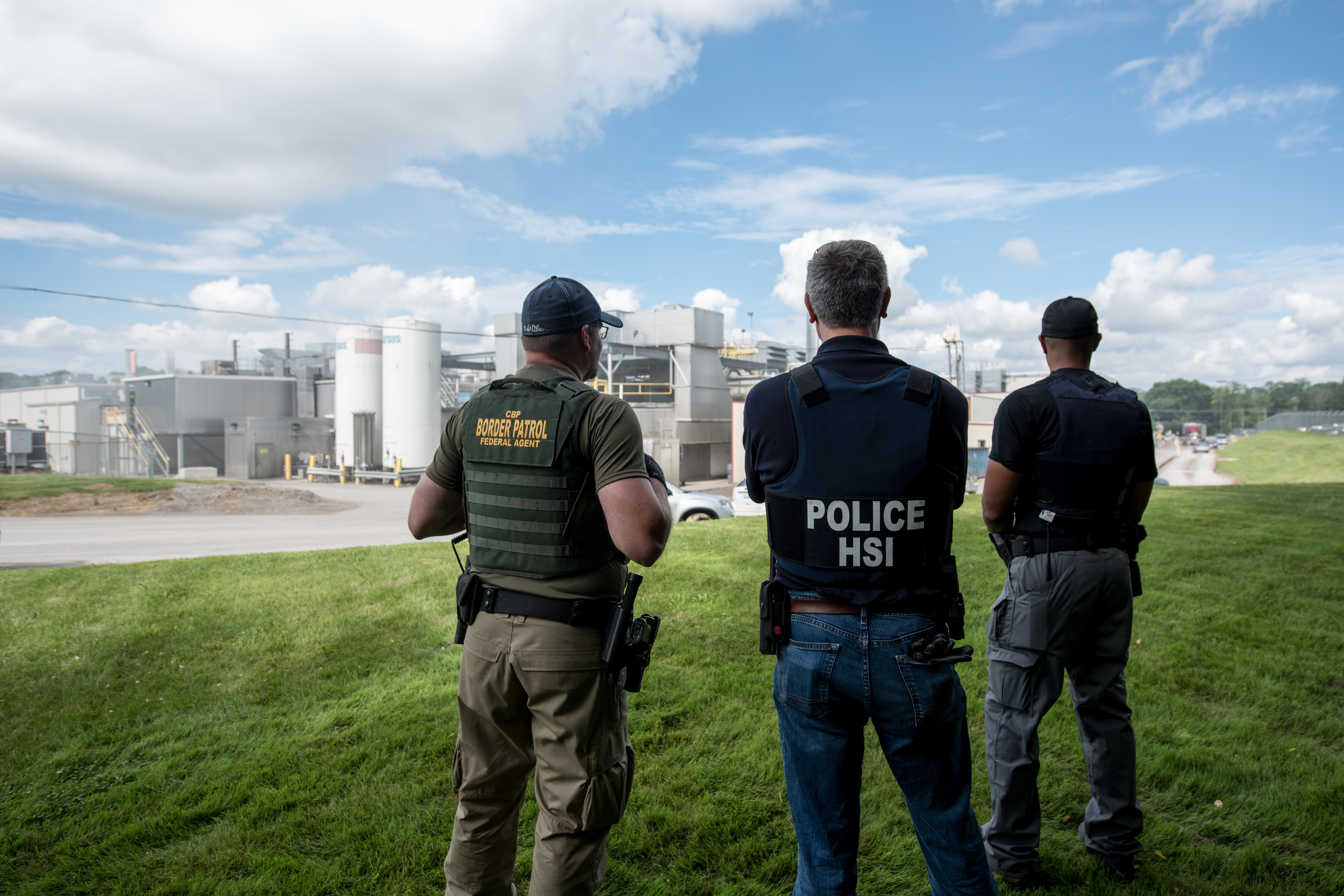

== Public opinion ==
Ohio's public opinion on immigration enforcement is mixed. In 2024 the majority of Ohio's voters are opposed to the recent ICE operations, including using unmarked vehicles and identity covering masks during operations/raids. Though there is a significant amount of criticism on immigration tactics a large portion of Ohio's continue to support strong border security and the enforcement of the law on immigration. Polling in last couple years shows that the majority of Ohioans despite there political identity believe that immigration enforcement should focus on people who have committed serious and deadly crimes vs going after all undocumented immigrants. Recently there have been protests speaking out against ICE raids from Ohio residents. These protests do not seem to change the mind of local law enforcements cooperation when it comes to supporting immigration enforcement. Advocacy groups in Ohio are at full force. Especially in northeast Ohio where groups are focusing on providing counsel to immigrants that do not know there legal status or just those who might need it.

== Ohio's approach and in-state policies ==
The degree of participation and implementation of federal immigration policies varies from state to state. A major factor to the approach Ohio has on these policies is that over the past decade the percentage of republican votes and republican representation has steadily increased through elections, which has slowly diminished the thought of Ohio being a swing state. In addition to the Republican Party's increased victory margin in Ohio in the 2024 election, immigration was a significant concern in Ohio and it was what Republicans primarily cared about. As a result of these election outcomes, the state of Ohio tends to fully enforce federal immigration policies, especially the policies implemented by the current republican administration.

=== Support for stricter implementation of immigration policies ===
In addition to the application of federal policies throughout the state, Ohio has passed bills of their own about immigration enforcement. Senate Bill 172 was the most recent bill that was passed through the senate on June 18, 2025, but is still awaiting to be signed into legislation. This bill would limit local governments' ability to restrict or prevent arrests related to immigration and explicitly establish that those who are in the country illegally are subject to arrest. Additionally, the bill states that if someone is asking about someone's immigration status or providing personal information for purposes of helping with immigration enforcement, public officials can't stop them from doing so.

Although there are not many laws that have been passed and implemented, numerous measures are now attempting to pass through the House and the Senate. This includes bills like House Bill 26 and House Bill 200 that would enforce stricter laws on immigrants and dispense more power to law enforcements throughout the state. House Bill 26 is also known as the "Protecting Ohio Communities Act". This bill would mandate cooperation between state and local authorities and ICE by requiring that immigrants be held for 48 hours and during this time ICE be contacted. It then states that if local administrations refuse to comply, their funding would be cut. Should this bill be approved, receiving public benefits from local government operations would require the verification of immigration status, and an emergency would be declared, allowing it to become immediately effective. Another bill that Ohio legislation is pushing is the "America First Act" which is House Bill 200. This measure would increase penalties and make it a felony to enter Ohio as an undocumented immigrant. It would establish the rule that if you were to commit this felony, you would be asked to leave the state within 72 hours and face a year in prison along with a $500 fine.

=== Objection to new strict immigration policies ===
Despite the state government advocating for the establishment of more harsh policies regarding immigration, they have been met with significant push back. Many social justice advocates are concerned about the implementation of policies that give local law enforcement more authority. Critics fear that racial profiling could come from law enforcement's authority to make arrests if they have any suspicions. Due to the fact that immigration-related infractions are usually civil in nature, law enforcement now has the authority to make an arrest without a warrant. The concern of citizens not going to their local law authorities have also been raised by advocates. Focusing more on enforcing this new system may cause the redirection of public safety resources, the diminishment of faith in local enforcement and the hindrance of victims of crimes going to their local police. The implementation of these policies have also led to legal repercussions, such as the lawsuits an advocacy group called ACLU have filed against county sheriffs. They are demanding to see the contracts these counties have with ICE, arguing that they are invalid and detention centers that originate from it are illegal. While counties have voted to confirm the validity of this contract, this could develop into legal action in the future.

Throughout all of this, the "sanctuary counties" throughout Ohio have taken action to counteract all that is in place. Franklin County recently passed local rules that do not allow any immigration arrests to occur at county courthouses without the possession of a court ordered warrant. The court argued the policies in place create a barrier or fear for citizens resulting in fewer statements and reduced presence within active courthouse cases, which provokes the idea of the public right to due process being endangered. Resistance to following these policies has also taken place in the city of Columbus. While the Trump administration believes Columbus is preventing the enforcement of federal immigration laws, Mayor Andrew Ginther has stayed firm with his executive order that was implemented in 2017, saying that the city's resources will not be used solely on the purpose of arresting citizens on the account of immigration.

== Examples of immigration enforcement in Ohio ==
On July 9, 2025, Ayman Soliman was detained by U.S. Immigration and Customs Enforcement (ICE). This came directly after his asylum status was revoked. Soliman left Egypt in 2014 he stated that he faced persecution for his religion as well as his journalism, Soliman was later granted asylum just 4 years after this. Soliman then went on to work as a chaplain in the Cincinnati Children's Hospital.

Soliman was taken to Butler County Jail in southwestern Ohio. Soliman's attorneys filed a habeas corpus petition in order to attempt to keep him at the Butler County Facility rather than be transferred elsewhere with there case being that a transfer would separate him from his counsel as well as his family. American attorney Kate Brady said "We have witnessed numerous incidents of detainees being removed under the cover of darkness and hastily shuffled from one location to another without legal contact." The Federal judge decided that Soliman will not to be moved without court approval.

State leaders like Representative Greg Landsman and the ACLU of Ohio put pressure on Soliman's detention because of the clean record Soliman has as well as his religious figure. These leaders called for transparency in ICE using county jail. A statement by the Department of Homeland Security was released that discussed how an ongoing application and legal status does not make someone unable to have immigration action be forced on them.

When Soliman got out of custody he stated the he went through harsh conditions. These harsh conditions included a 5-day isolation period in a cell with zero access to legal counsel, anything religious, and commissary. He said that he got handcuffed after politely requesting to pray. Although ICE never publicly commented on these allegations.

10 weeks went by in detention and Soliman was finally released in September 2025 after going through a huge amount of legal and community advocacy. Solomon's visa is expected to be restored soon which will let him remain a citizen in the United States. Solomon's supporters talk about his release as a win for the process of due process. Soliman himself called it a "rebirth".
