= Luis Bracamontes =

Convicted of murder, on death row in the U.S.

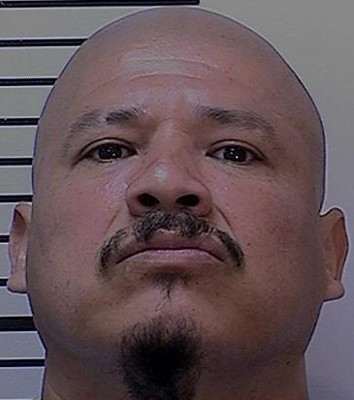
- Born: Luis Enrique Monroy Bracamontes; 1979 or 1980 (age 46–47); Mexico
- Conviction: First degree murder with special circumstances (2 counts) (both of the perpetrators)
- Penalty: Bracamontes: Death; Monroy: Life in prison with the possibility of parole after 50 years
- Accomplice: Janelle Monroy

Details
- Date: October 24, 2014
- Locations: Sacramento County and Placer County, California, US
- Target: Policemen in Sacramento
- Killed: Michael Davis; Danny Oliver
- Injured: Anthony Holmes; Jeff Davis
- Weapons: AR-15 style rifle; Semi-automatic pistol

Luis Enrique Monroy Bracamontes (born 1979 or 1980) is a convicted murderer who murdered two police officers with his female accomplice in Northern California. On October 24, 2014, Bracamontes opened fire on three Sacramento metropolitan area sheriff's deputies, killing two and wounding the third, while a civilian was also wounded in the shooting. Bracamontes is a citizen of Mexico and a convicted drug dealer who was in the United States illegally. Bracamontes was sentenced to death in 2018. His death sentence was commuted by Governor Gavin Newsome.

== Arrests and deportations ==
Bracamontes is an illegal immigrant who had been previously deported twice. He was first deported in 1997 after being convicted in Arizona on charges of possessing narcotics for sale. In 1998, he was arrested again on drug charges in Phoenix, but was released "for reasons unknown" by former Maricopa County Sheriff Joe Arpaio.

Bracamontes was arrested and deported to Mexico again in 2001.

== Shootings and criminal conviction ==
Bracamontes was using the name Marcelo Marquez when he, along with his wife, Janelle Monroy, then aged 37, a US citizen from Utah, shot and killed a sheriff's deputy, Danny Oliver of the Sacramento County Sheriffs Department, in the Arden-Arcade neighborhood of Sacramento with a pistol. He then carjacked several vehicles, a white Mustang from a woman named Chantelle and shot a driver, Anthony Holmes during an unsuccessful attempt. Bracamontes then fatally shot another police officer, Detective Michael Davis of the Placer County Sheriff's Department with a rifle, when he was located in the Auburn Area; he also seriously wounded Davis' partner, Deputy Jeff Davis (no relation). He was eventually taken into custody after an extensive manhunt in the area. After a lengthy courts process of about four years, which was highlighted by his repeated outbursts and other actions in the courtroom, Bracamontes was sentenced to death on April 25, 2018. Monroy was tried separately and convicted of one count of murder, several counts of attempted murder, and multiple carjacking and weapon-related charges. On March 23, 2018, she was sentenced to 50 years to life in prison, rejecting the defense's argument that she was a battered woman acting under duress. Judge Steve White her case noted, "Ms. Monroy, you did not start this reign of terror, but you joined in immediately after as an active participant".

== Responses ==
The shooting came to national attention in debates over the Obama administration's policies on immigration in the fall of 2014. The shootings came to national attention again when President Trump invited Jessica Davis and Susan Oliver, the widows of slain officers Detective Michael Davis and Deputy Sheriff Danny Oliver, to attend his first address to a joint session of Congress on February 28, 2017.

=== Trump administration advertisement ===
Approximately one week before the 2018 midterm elections, the Trump administration ran an advertising that linked Bracamontes to Democrats, accusing Democrats of letting Bracamontes and other dangerous, undocumented immigrants into the United States. The ad drew widespread and bipartisan condemnation and was compared to the infamous Willie Horton ad during the 1988 presidential campaign. Republican Senator Jeff Flake said the ad was "a new low in campaigning" and "sickening", Republican Ohio Governor John Kasich said "all Americans should reject this ad and its motives" and Representative Carlos Curbelo condemned the ad as part of a "a divide-and-conquer strategy".

Fact-checkers at PolitiFact, The Washington Post and The Sacramento Bee found that the assertions "Democrats let him (Luis Bracamontes) into our country" and "Democrats let him stay" were false. CNN refused to air the ad, describing it as a "racist anti-immigration commercial". NBC and Fox News aired the ad, but later said they would not air it again. Facebook pulled the ad from its platform, saying it violated their community standards.

== See also ==
- List of homicides in California
- Colorado sanctuary city controversy
- Illegal immigration to the United States and crime
- List of death row inmates in the United States
- List of law enforcement officers killed in the line of duty in the United States
- Murder of Jamiel Shaw II
- Office of Victims of Immigration Crime Engagement
- Shooting of Kathryn Steinle
