= Victims of Immigration Crime Engagement =

American federal agency

Victims of Immigration Crime Engagement Office
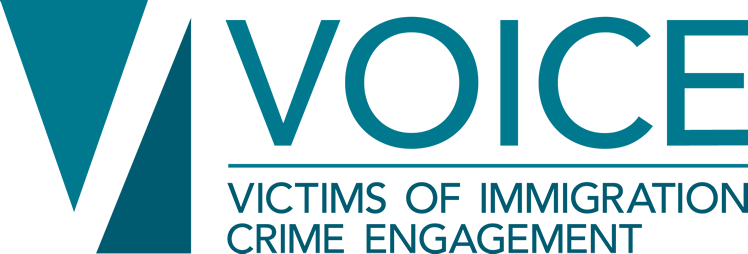

Agency overview
- Formed: February 25, 2017 (original); April 9, 2025 (re-established)
- Dissolved: June 11, 2021
- Parent department: Department of Homeland Security
- Parent agency: Immigration and Customs Enforcement
- Key documents: Executive Order 13768 (original); Executive Order 14159 (re-established)
- Website: www.ice.gov/voice

The Victims of Immigration Crime Engagement (VOICE) Office is a U.S. government agency that was established within the Department of Homeland Security under the first Trump administration in February 2017. President Donald Trump directed it be established by Executive Order 13768. The office was dissolved by the Biden administration on June 11, 2021, replaced by the Victims Engagement and Services Line (VESL). It was reopened, in 2025, under the second Trump administration.

The office's mission was to "provide proactive, timely, adequate, and professional services to victims of crimes committed by removable aliens". The office's purpose was to act as a liaison between U.S. Immigration and Customs Enforcement and the victims and their families to ensure they would be provided information about the offender, including the offender's immigration and custody status so that their questions and concerns regarding immigration enforcement efforts would be addressed.

The VOICE office was to issue quarterly reports studying the effects of the victimization by criminal aliens present in the United States. Only one report, in June 2018, was issued through the agency's existence.

== Establishment ==
The office was established pursuant to section 13 of the January 25, 2017, Executive Order 13768 – Enhancing Public Safety in the Interior of the United States, which states:

Sec. 13. Office for Victims of Crimes Committed by Removable Aliens. The Secretary shall direct the Director of U.S. Immigration and Customs Enforcement to take all appropriate and lawful action to establish within U.S. Immigration and Customs Enforcement an office to provide proactive, timely, adequate, and professional services to victims of crimes committed by removable aliens and the family members of such victims. This office shall provide quarterly reports studying the effects of the victimization by criminal aliens present in the United States.

== Purpose and background ==
The stated purpose of the office is to provide information about offenders to victims, and address questions and concerns of victims regarding immigration enforcement efforts. In a speech on February 28, 2017, President Trump discussed the new office and referred to the murders of Jamiel Shaw, Deputy Sheriff Danny Oliver and Detective Michael Davis as victims of immigrant crime. He asserted that victims of immigrant crime have been "ignored by our media, and silenced by special interests".

== Re-establishment ==
VOICE was re-established in the second presidency of Donald Trump under Executive Order 14159 and announced at a press conference on April 9, 2025.

== Reactions ==
=== Support ===
Maria Espinoza, director of the Remembrance Project, an anti-illegal immigration organization, said that such an office was needed "because the perpetrators are illegally in the U.S. If they are here illegally they should be removed from the country". Mark Krikorian, director of the Center for Immigration Studies said "highlighting some victims of criminal aliens doesn't suggest that all immigrants are criminals. Shame on those advocacy groups that are trying to minimize the experience of these families."

Hans von Spakovsky of The Heritage Foundation said, "that every crime that is committed by someone who is here illegally is a crime that would not occur if they weren't in the country." John Fonte, a senior fellow at the Hudson Institute, said that "the office would serve several good purposes that are directly related to immigration policy, politics, and civic morality."

=== Criticism ===
Critics said that the office overlapped and duplicated the mission of the existing Office for Victims of Crime (OVC) within the Department of Justice (DOJ), which was established in the 1980s and serves the victims of all types of crime. The executive director of the National Center for Victims of Crime said of the plan: "It's complete and utter duplication and there's no need. I'm not sure what this office would do or what services it would offer different than what is available at DOJ." Criminologist James Alan Fox, the Lipman Professor of Criminology, Law and Public Policy at Northeastern University, criticized the creation of VOICE, saying that it duplicated the mission of OVC.

An editorial in the Baltimore Sun said that Trump's claim of victims being ignored and silenced was false, noting that crimes by immigrants generally received disproportionate attention in the media. It referred to Trump's statement as "race-baiting".

Tessa Stuart of Rolling Stone said, "The memo doesn't mention it, but presumably the [VOICE] office would distribute the weekly list of criminal actions committed by undocumented immigrants that Trump promised in a recent executive order."

New York City mayor Bill de Blasio and writer Peter Beinart have said that Trump's establishment of the office is a form of scapegoating. Daniel Benjamin, a former U.S. State Department counter-terrorism official now at Dartmouth College, wrote that the office was not intended to meet a real need, but rather was aimed at promoting the view that immigrants are dangerous.

The Washington Post fact-checked Trump's claims regarding immigration and crime and found that "the vast majority of illegal immigrants do not fit Trump's description of aggravated felons", citing studies by the Congressional Research Service. (Note: The Congressional Research Service found that of the approximately 10.8 to 11.5 million unauthorized resident aliens in the U.S. in 2011, the number of incarcerated criminal aliens was 173,000. Applying national rates of non-incarcerated criminals (i.e., those on parole and probation) they estimated that the total number of criminal aliens nationally to be 519,000. Note that, according to the report, unauthorized entry alone is normally a civil offense, and does not contribute to classification as a criminal alien.) Kevin Drum noted that even the anti-illegal immigration Center for Immigration Studies said that there was "no clear evidence that immigrants commit crimes at higher or lower rates than others." (Note: The Center for Immigration Studies piece continues, "Even though immigrant incarceration rates are high in some populations, there is no clear evidence that immigrants commit crimes at higher or lower rates than others. Nevertheless, it also would be a mistake to conclude that immigrant crime is insignificant or that offenders' immigration status is irrelevant in local policing. The newer information available as a result of better screening of the incarcerated population suggests that, in many parts of the country, immigrants are responsible for a significant share of crime. This indicates that there are legitimate public safety reasons for local law enforcement agencies to determine the immigration status of offenders and to work with federal immigration authorities.") Anti-immigration organizations dispute the relevance of this, as they consider immigrant crime per se a sign of ineffective vetting and enforcement policies.

Amanda Erickson wrote in The Washington Post that publishing regular reports on the illicit behavior of undocumented immigrants – as well as singling out a particular group – "was employed to great effect by Adolf Hitler and his allies. In the 1930s, the Nazis used a similar tactic to stir up anger and hatred toward Jews". Historian Richard Weikart, who has written about the Third Reich said that drawing a direct parallel between Trump and Hitler was "misguided", adding that "this issue doesn't really rise to that level". Erickson said that "a regular government report is a far cry from the Nazis' aggressive, constant drumbeat against the Jews", but added that "The point is not that VOICE equals the Reich Ministry of Public Enlightenment and Propaganda. But when leaders use the levers of government to drum up fear of one group of people, we should all be worried."

== See also ==
- Angel Families
- Immigration and Nationality Act Section 287(g)
- Illegal immigration to the United States
- Illegal immigration to the United States and crime
- Immigration and crime
- Immigration policy of Donald Trump
- Immigration reduction in the United States
- List of executive actions by Donald Trump
- Opposition to immigration
