= Sanctuary city =

Aspect of immigration law

A sanctuary city is a municipality that limits or denies its cooperation with the national government in enforcing immigration law.

Proponents of sanctuary cities cite motives such as reducing the fear for undocumented people affected by deportation, separation of immigrant families, reporting crimes, using health and social services, and enrolling their children into a school.

Opponents of sanctuary cities argue that they undermine the rule of law by not cooperating with federal immigration authorities. They also highlight concerns about public safety, pointing to cases where a person involved in violent crimes was released instead of being handed over to proper authorities. Critics claim that sanctuary cities act as magnets for illegal immigration, attracting more people to enter unlawfully. They also argue that these cities place a strain on local resources, as people who have illegally immigrated may access public services like healthcare, housing, and education.

Some studies on the relationship between sanctuary status and crime have found that sanctuary policies either have no effect on crime or that sanctuary cities have lower crime rates and stronger economies than comparable non-sanctuary cities. In 2016 The Washington Post reported that in the United States "decades of research actually shows that immigrants – whether legal or illegal – tend to have lower crime rates". Similarly, a 2017 report by the Center for American Progress concluded that "statistical analysis illustrates that across a range of social and economic indicators, sanctuary counties perform better than comparable nonsanctuary counties." A 2017 review in Sociology Compass concluded that "[t]he few empirical studies that exist illustrate a 'null' or negative relationship between these policies and crime."

Sanctuary city policies substantially reduce deportations of illegal immigrants who do not have criminal records, but have no impact on those who have violent criminal records. Opponents of sanctuary cities argue that cities should assist the national government in enforcing immigration law. Supporters of sanctuary cities argue that enforcement of federal law is not the duty of localities, and that law enforcement resources can be prioritized towards better purposes.

The term "sanctuary city" is chiefly used in North American English. When it is used in Europe, it generally refers to cities committed to supporting legal refugees and asylum seekers, not illegal immigration. Over 80 towns and cities across the United Kingdom adopt policies aimed at fostering community connections, raising awareness, and building cultural ties to support these groups. In this sense, Glasgow and Swansea have become noted sanctuary cities.

== United States ==
Sanctuary city policies in the United States (2025) State legislation in place that establishes a statewide sanctuary for unauthorized immigration. State effectively banned all forms of protection and will honor ICE detainers.

In the United States, municipal policies include prohibiting police or city employees from questioning people about their immigration status and refusing requests by national immigration authorities to detain people beyond their release date, if they were jailed for breaking local law. These policies limit local cooperation with the enforcement of federal immigration law, (Note: Specifically, 8 U.S.C. § 1325 and related criminal offenses under Title 8 Part VIII of the United States Code, which address unlawful entry and related immigration violations. See: Title 8 U.S.C. Part VIII: General Penalty Provisions) including by declining to honor detention requests from national immigration authorities. Such policies can be set expressly in law (de jure) or observed in practice (de facto), but the designation "sanctuary city" does not have a precise legal definition.

=== History ===
The movement that established sanctuary cities in the United States began in the early 1980s. The movement traces its roots to religious philosophy, as well as the histories of resistance movements to perceived state injustices. The sanctuary city movement took place in the 1980s to challenge the US government's refusal to grant asylum to certain Central American refugees. These asylum seekers were arriving from countries in Central America like El Salvador and Guatemala that were politically unstable. More than 75,000 Salvadoreans and 200,000 Guatemalans were killed in civil wars.

Faith-based groups in the US Southwest initially drove the movement of the 1980s, with eight churches publicly declaring to be sanctuaries in March 1982. John Fife, a minister and movement leader, famously wrote in a letter to U.S. attorney general William Smith: "the South-side United Presbyterian Church will publicly violate the Immigration and Nationality Act by allowing sanctuary in its church for those from Central America."

A milestone in the U.S. sanctuary city movement occurred in 1985 in San Francisco, which passed the largely symbolic "City of Refuge" resolution. A 1985 city ordinance prohibited the use of city funds and resources to assist federal immigration enforcement—the defining characteristic of a sanctuary city in the US. As of 2018, more than 560 cities, states and counties considered themselves sanctuaries. Some have questioned the accuracy of the term "sanctuary city" as used in the US.

=== Terminology ===
Several different terms and phrases are used to describe immigrants who entered U.S. illegally.

The term alien, primarily used between the 1970s and 2010s American news sources, is considered by many immigrant rights advocates to be derogatory and dehumanizing. According to the data analytics company LexisNexis, the usage of the term alien in reports on immigration has declined substantially, making up just 5% of terms used major news media in 2013. The U.S. Citizenship Act of 2021, which President Joe Biden proposed to Congress, would eliminate the word "alien" from federal immigration laws and replace it with "noncitizen".

Usage of the word "illegal" and phrases using the word (e.g., illegal alien, illegal immigrant, illegal worker and illegal migrant) has declined, accounting for 82% of language used in 1996, 75% in 2002, 60% in 2007, and 57% in 2013.

Several other phrases are used: undocumented immigrant (usage in news reports increased from 6% in 1996 to 14% in 2013); unauthorized immigrant (3% usage in 2013 and rarely seen before that time), and undocumented person or undocumented people (1% in 2007, increasing to 3% in 2013). In this context, undocumented generally does not refer to statelessness, but to illegal immigration status.

Media outlets' policies as to use of terms differ, and no consensus has yet emerged in the press. In 2013, the Associated Press changed its AP Stylebook to provide that "Except in direct quotes essential to the story, use illegal only to refer to an action, not a person: illegal immigration, but not illegal immigrant. Acceptable variations include living in or entering a country illegally or without legal permission." Within several weeks, major U.S. newspapers such as Chicago Tribune, the Los Angeles Times, and USA Today adopted similar guidance. The New York Times style guide states that the term illegal immigrant may be considered "loaded or offensive" and advises journalists to "explain the specific circumstances of the person in question or to focus on actions: who crossed the border illegally; who overstayed a visa; who is not authorized to work in this country." The style book discourages the use of illegal as a noun and the alien. The stylebook notes that unauthorized and undocumented are acceptable, but the former "has a flavor of euphemism and should be used with caution outside quotation" and the latter has a "bureaucratic tone." The Washington Post stylebook "says 'illegal immigrant' is accurate and acceptable, but notes that some find it offensive"; the Post "does not refer to people as 'illegal aliens' or 'illegals,'" per its guidelines.

Sanctuary restaurants are a related idea. It is a program run by Presente.org and the Restaurant Opportunities Center.

=== Electoral politics ===
The issue entered presidential politics in the race for the 2008 Republican Party presidential nomination.

Colorado Congressman Tom Tancredo ran on an anti-illegal immigration platform and specifically attacked sanctuary cities. Former Massachusetts Governor Mitt Romney accused former New York City Mayor Rudy Giuliani of running it as a sanctuary city. Mayor Giuliani's campaign responded saying that Governor Romney ran a sanctuary Governor's mansion, and that New York City is not a "haven" for illegal immigrants.

In July 2015, 32-year-old Kathryn Steinle was fatally shot by an illegal immigrant who had previously been deported 5 times. The shooting took place in San Francisco, a sanctuary city, sparking national debate over immigration and sanctuary city policies. Former Secretary of State and presidential candidate Hillary Clinton told CNN that "The city made a mistake, not to deport someone that the federal government strongly felt should be deported. I have absolutely no support for a city that ignores the strong evidence that should be acted on." The following day, her campaign stated: "Hillary Clinton believes that sanctuary cities can help further public safety, and she has defended those policies going back years."

==== Trump administration ====
On March 6, 2018, the U.S. Department of Justice sued the state of California, the Governor Jerry Brown, and the state's attorney general, Xavier Becerra, over three recently passed state laws, saying the laws made it impossible for federal immigration officials to do their jobs and deport criminals who were born outside the United States. The Justice Department called the laws unconstitutional and asked a judge to block them. The lawsuit said the state laws "reflect a deliberate effort by California to obstruct the United States' enforcement of federal immigration law."

The Trump administration previously released a list of immigration principles to Congress. The list included funding a wall along the U.S.-Mexico border, a crackdown on the influx of Central American minors, and curbs on federal grants to sanctuary cities. A pledge to strip "all federal funding to sanctuary cities" was a key Trump campaign theme. President Trump issued an executive order which declared that jurisdictions that "refuse to comply" with 8 U.S.C. 1373—a provision of federal law on information sharing between local and federal authorities—would be ineligible to receive federal grants.

States and cities have shown varying responses to the executive order. Thirty-three states introduced or enacted legislation requiring local law enforcement to cooperate with ICE officers and requests to hold non-citizen inmates for deportation. Other states and cities have responded by not cooperating with federal immigration efforts or by showcasing welcoming policies towards immigrants. California openly refused the administration's attempts to "clamp down on sanctuary cities". A federal judge in San Francisco agreed with two California municipalities that a presidential attempt to cut them off from federal funding for not complying with deportation requests was unconstitutional, ultimately issuing a nationwide permanent injunction against the facially unconstitutional provisions of the order.

On March 27, 2018, the all-Republican Board of Supervisors in Orange County, California voted to join the Justice Department's lawsuit against the state. In Chicago, a federal judge ruled that the Trump administration may not withhold public safety grants to sanctuary cities. These decisions have been seen as a setback to the administration's efforts to force local jurisdictions to help federal authorities with the policing of illegal immigrants. On July 5, 2018, a federal judge upheld two of California's Sanctuary laws but struck down a key provision in the third.

Local officials who oppose the president's policies say that complying with federal immigration officers will ruin the trust established between law enforcement and immigrant communities. Supporters of the president's policies say that protection of immigrants from enforcement makes communities less safe and undermines the rule of law. On July 12, 2019, federal appeals court in Seattle in a 2-to-1 opinion overturned a nationwide injunction issued last year by a federal judge in Los Angeles. The appeals court said awarding extra points in the application process to cities that cooperate was consistent with the goals of the grant program created by Congress.

The Department of Justice publishes a list of jurisdictions with policies, laws or regulations that obstruct enforcement of federal immigration laws determined by a review of laws, ordinances, and executive directives. The list was instituted per Executive Order 14287.

=== Federal legislation ===
The Illegal Immigration Reform and Immigrant Responsibility Act of 1996 addressed the relationship between the federal and local governments. Minor crimes, such as shoplifting, became grounds for possible deportation. The legislation outlawed cities' bans against municipal workers reporting a person's immigration status to federal authorities. Nothing in the law forces states or local governments to help the federal government with immigration enforcement.

Section 287(g) makes it possible for state and local law enforcement personnel to enter into agreements with the federal government to be trained in immigration enforcement and, subsequent to such training, to enforce immigration law. However, it provides no general power for immigration enforcement by state and local authorities. This provision was implemented by local and state authorities in five states, California, Arizona, Alabama, Florida and North Carolina by the end of 2006.

On June 16, 2007, the United States House of Representatives passed an amendment to a United States Department of Homeland Security spending bill that would withhold federal emergency services funds from sanctuary cities. Congressman Tom Tancredo (R-Colo.) was the sponsor of this amendment. Fifty Democrats joined Republicans to support the amendment. The amendment would have to pass the United States Senate to become effective.

In 2007, Republican representatives introduced legislation targeting sanctuary cities. Reps. Brian Bilbray, R-Calif., Ginny Brown-Waite, R-Fla., Thelma Drake, R-Va., Jeff Miller, R-Fla., and Tom Tancredo introduced the bill. The legislation would make illegal immigration status a felony, instead of a civil offense. Also, the bill targets sanctuary cities by withholding up to 50 percent of Department of Homeland Security funds from the cities.

On September 5, 2007, Department of Homeland Security Secretary Michael Chertoff told a House committee that he certainly wouldn't tolerate interference by sanctuary cities that would block his "Basic Pilot Program" that requires employers to validate the legal status of their workers. "We're exploring our legal options. I intend to take as vigorous legal action as the law allows to prevent that from happening, prevent that kind of interference."

On January 25, 2017, President Donald Trump signed Executive Order 13768 directing the Secretary of Homeland Security and Attorney General to defund sanctuary jurisdictions that refuse to comply with federal immigration law. He also ordered the Department of Homeland Security to begin issuing weekly public reports that include "a comprehensive list of criminal actions committed by aliens and any jurisdiction that ignored or otherwise failed to honor any detainers with respect to such aliens."

Ilya Somin, Professor of Law at George Mason University, has argued that Trump's withholding of federal funding would be unconstitutional: "Trump and future presidents could use [the executive order] to seriously undermine constitutional federalism by forcing dissenting cities and states to obey presidential dictates, even without authorization from Congress. The circumvention of Congress makes the order a threat to separation of powers, as well."

On April 25, 2017, U.S. District Judge William Orrick issued a nationwide preliminary injunction halting this executive order. The injunction was made permanent on November 20, 2017, when Judge Orrick ruled that section 9(a) of the order was "unconstitutional on its face". The judgment concluded that the order violates "the separation of powers doctrine and deprives [the plaintiffs] of their Tenth and Fifth Amendment rights."

In December 2018, in United States v. Sineneng-Smith, the Ninth U.S. Circuit Court of Appeals struck down a federal law that criminalized encouraging people to enter or live in the U.S. illegally. The court said the law was too broad in restricting the basic right of free speech under the First Amendment to the U.S. Constitution. Opponents of the law argued that it was a danger to lawyers advising immigrants and to public officials who support sanctuary policies.

On January 20, 2025, and February 19, 2025, President Donald Trump signed Executive Order 14159 and Executive Order 14218 directing the Secretary of Homeland Security and Attorney General to withhold funds once again from sanctuary jurisdictions whose policies aim to "shield illegal aliens from deportation."

On February 7, 2025, a coalition of local governments led by San Francisco and Santa Clara County filed a lawsuit, San Francisco v. Trump (2025), to protect sanctuary jurisdictions from federal overreach of Immigration Enforcement and to challenge attempts to cut or condition federal funding. On August 22, 2025, a district court issued a preliminary injunction blocking the Trump administration from withholding or freezing federal funding from municipalities and counties it labels as "sanctuary jurisdictions," extending protection to 50 jurisdictions total.

On February 9, 2026, Senator Lindsey Graham (R. South Carolina) introduced the End Sanctuary Cities Act, which would impose criminal penalties on state and local officials who ignore DHS requests to detain undocumented immigrants. A separate House measure, introduced by Rep. Tom McClintock, R-Calif., was the Shut Down Sanctuary Policies Act, allowing for local enforcement of immigration law without being sued or harassed by sanctuary jurisdictions.

==== Jurisdiction ====
Whether or not the U.S. Constitution affords local governments with jurisdiction to detain illegal immigrants for deportation, is a longstanding dispute, vigorously debated since the Alien Act of 1798.

Opponents of local level policing often cite to the Naturalization Clause and the Migration clause in the Constitution as textual confirmation of federal power. Because the Supremacy Clause is generally interpreted to mean that federal law takes priority over state law, the U.S. Supreme Court in the majority of cases has ruled in favor of the federal government. Certain states have been affected by illegal immigration more than others and have attempted to pass legislation that limits access by illegal immigrants to public benefits. A notable case was Arizona's SB 1070 law, which was passed in 2010 and struck down in 2012 by the Supreme Court as unconstitutional.

States like Arizona, Texas and Nevada justify the aggressive actions they have taken to be the result of insufficient efforts by the federal government to address issues, like the use of schools and hospitals by illegal immigrants, and changes to the cultural landscape—impacts that are most visible on a local level. Ambiguity and confusion over jurisdiction is one of the reasons why local and state policies for and against sanctuary cities vary widely depending on the location in the country.

=== Effects ===
==== Crime ====
Studies show that US sanctuary cities either have no major impact on crime, or lower the crime rate.

According to an article done by Gale Opposing Viewpoints, a 2015 study by the American Immigration Council "determined that both documented and undocumented immigrants are less likely to engage in criminal behavior than native-born Americans," and that there was a decrease in "violent crime and serious property crime in cities" with growing illegal immigrant populations.

A 2017 study in the journal Urban Affairs Review found that sanctuary policy itself has no statistically meaningful effect on crime. The findings of the study were misinterpreted by Attorney General Jeff Sessions in a July 2017 speech when he falsely claimed that the study showed that sanctuary cities were more prone to crime than cities without sanctuary policies. A third study in the journal Justice Quarterly found evidence that the adoption of sanctuary policies reduced the robbery rate, but had no impact on the homicide rate except in cities with larger Mexican illegal immigrant populations, which had lower rates of homicide.

According to a study by Tom K. Wong, associate professor of political science at the University of California, San Diego, published by the Center for American Progress, a progressive think tank: "Crime is statistically significantly lower in sanctuary counties compared to non-sanctuary counties. Moreover, economies are stronger in sanctuary counties – from higher median household income, less poverty, and less reliance on public assistance, to higher labor force participation, higher employment-to-population ratios, and lower unemployment." The study also concluded that sanctuary cities build trust between local law enforcement and the community, which enhances public safety overall. The study evaluated sanctuary and non-sanctuary cities while controlling for differences in population, the foreign-born percentage of the population, and the percentage of the population that is Latino."

A 2020 study found that California Senate Bill 54 (2017), a sanctuary city legislation, had no significant impact on violent and property crime rates in California.

A 2021 US study found that Latinos were more likely to report crime victimization to law enforcement after sanctuary policies were adopted in their areas of residence.

==== Economy ====
Advocates of local enforcement of immigration laws argue that more regulatory local immigration policies would cause immigrants to flee those cities and possibly the United States altogether, while opponents argue that regulatory policies on immigrants wouldn't affect their presence because immigrants looking for work will relocate towards economic opportunity despite challenges living there. Illegal immigrants tend to be attracted to states with more economic opportunity and individual freedom. Because there is no reliable data that asks for immigration status, there is no way to tell empirically if regulatory policies do have an effect on immigrant presence. A study comparing restrictive counties with nonrestrictive counties found that local jurisdictions that enacted regulatory immigration policies experienced a 1–2% negative effect in employment.

==== Health and well-being ====
A preliminary study's results imply that the number of sanctuary cities in the U.S. positively affects well-being in the illegal immigrant population. Concerning health, a study in North Carolina found that after implementation of section 287(g), prenatal Hispanic/Latina mothers were more likely than non-Hispanic/Latina mothers to have late or inadequate prenatal care. The study's interviews indicated that Hispanics/Latinos in the section 287(g) counties had distrust in health services among other services and was afraid about going to the doctor.

=== Laws and policies by state and city ===
Pro-sanctuary states are in blue, states which have banned sanctuary cities are in red, and states in gray have no official policy.

Pro-sanctuary states largely voted Democratic in the 2024 United States presidential election

==== Alabama ====
Alabama has banned sanctuary cities. The state law (Alabama HB 56) was enacted in 2011, calling for proactive immigration enforcement; however, many provisions are either blocked by the federal courts or subject to ongoing lawsuits.

- In January 2017, William A. Bell, the mayor of Birmingham, declared the city a "welcoming city" and said that the police would not be "an enforcement arm of the federal government" with respect to federal immigration law. He stated that the city would not require proof of citizenship for granting business licenses. The Birmingham City Council passed a resolution supporting Birmingham being a "sanctuary city".

==== Arizona ====
Arizona has banned sanctuary cities. Following the passage of Arizona SB 1070, few if any cities in Arizona are sanctuary cities. A provision of SB 1070 requires local authorities to "contact federal immigration authorities if they develop reasonable suspicion that a person they've detained or arrested is in the country illegally."

- The Center for Immigration Studies, an anti-immigration group, labels only one city in the state, South Tucson, a "sanctuary city"; the label is because South Tucson does not honor ICE detainers "unless ICE pays for cost of detention".
- In 2019, Tucson held a citywide vote on Proposition 205, which would have declared it a sanctuary city. The proposition failed 70–30. Amongst others, Democratic outgoing Mayor Jonathan Rothschild and mayoral candidates Steve Farley, Randi Dorman and eventual winner Regina Romero, alongside city councilmembers and US Senate candidate Mark Kelly endorsed a "No" vote.

==== Arkansas ====
Arkansas has banned sanctuary cities.

==== California ====
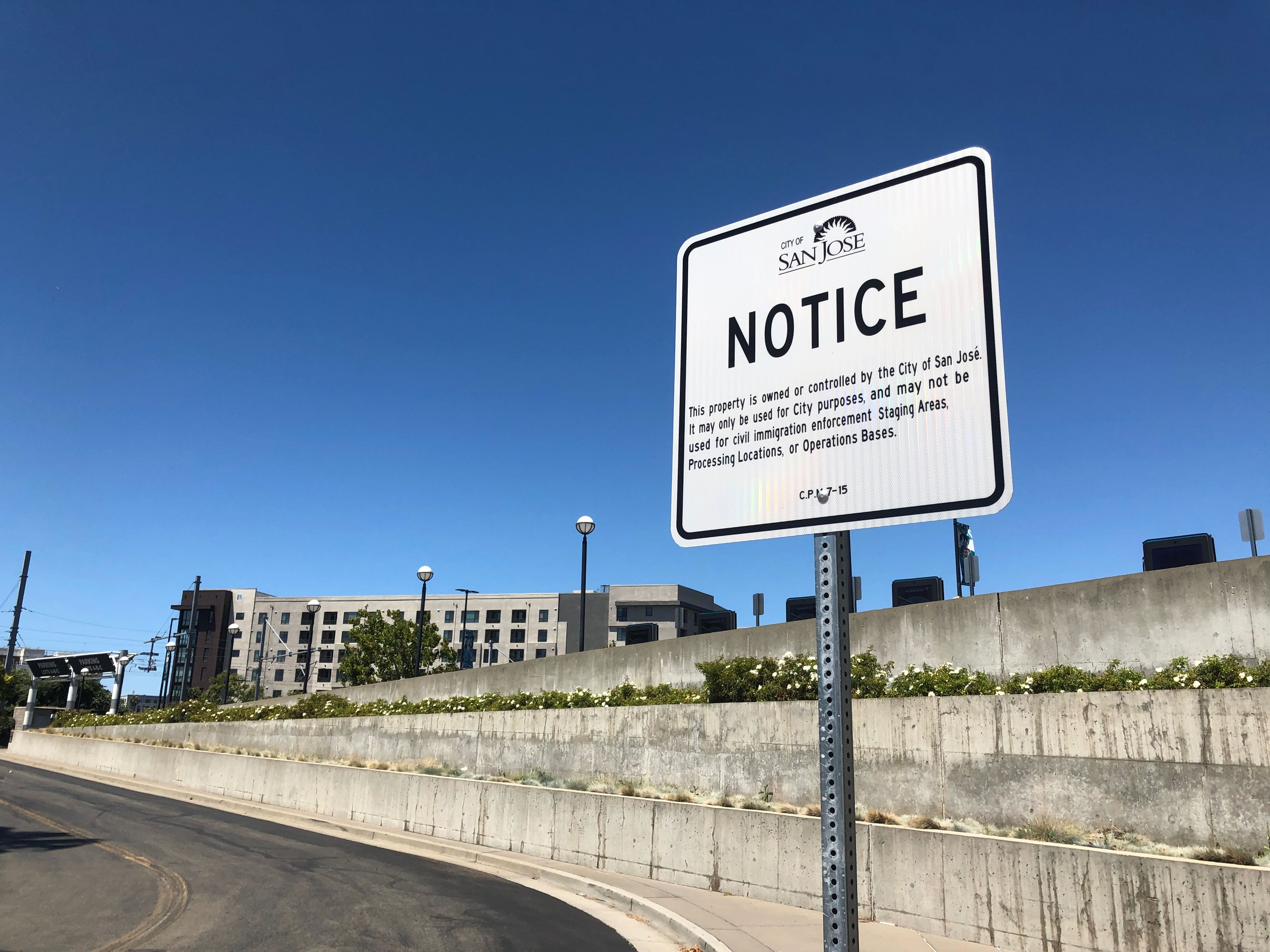
The government of San Jose, California, prohibits the use of city-owned parking lots to support civil immigration enforcement actions.

In October 2017, Governor Jerry Brown signed a bill, SB 54, that makes California a "sanctuary state". It prohibits local and state agencies from cooperating with ICE regarding illegal immigrants who have committed misdemeanors. According to the National Immigration Law Center in 2016, about a dozen California cities have some formal sanctuary policy, and none of the 58 California counties "complies with detainer requests by U.S. Immigration and Customs Enforcement."

- Berkeley became the first city in the United States to pass a sanctuary resolution in November 1971. Additional local governments in certain cities in the United States began designating themselves as sanctuary cities during the 1980s. The policy was initiated in 1979 in Los Angeles, to prevent the Los Angeles Police Department (LAPD) from inquiring about the immigration status of arrestees. Many Californian cities have adopted "sanctuary" ordinances banning city employees and public safety personnel from asking people about their immigration status.
- Coachella – 95% Latino, 2nd highest percentage Latino city in Southern California, the city adopted the sanctuary policy in 2015.
- Huntington Beach obtained a ruling from the state Supreme Court that the protections in California for immigrants who are in the country illegally do not apply to the 121 charter cities. The Orange County city is the first to successfully challenge SB 54.
- Los Angeles – In 1979, the Los Angeles City Council adopted Special Order 40, barring LAPD officers from initiating contact with a person solely to determine their immigration status. However, the city frequently cooperates with federal immigration authorities. Los Angeles Mayor Eric Garcetti did not use the phrase "sanctuary city" to describe the city. In 2024, Los Angeles adopted a sanctuary city ordinance that prohibits city resources from being used in immigration enforcement or to cooperate with federal immigration agents, unless required by state law.
- San Francisco "declared itself a sanctuary city in 1989, and city officials strengthened the stance in 2013 with its 'Due Process for All' ordinance. The law declared local authorities could not hold immigrants for immigration officials if they had no violent felonies on their records and did not currently face charges." The city issues a Resident ID Card regardless of the applicant's immigration status. The 2015 shooting of Kathryn Steinle provoked debate about San Francisco's "sanctuary city" policy.
- Seaside – In March 2017, Seaside became Monterey County's first sanctuary city.
- Williams – 75% Latino, largest percentage Latino town in Northern California, adopted the policy in 2015.

==== Colorado ====
In May 2019, Governor Jared Polis signed House Bill 1124 immediately prohibiting law enforcement officials in Colorado from holding illegal immigrants solely on the basis of a request from U.S. Immigration and Customs Enforcement.

- Boulder became a sanctuary city in 2017.
- Denver does not identify as a sanctuary city. The Denver Post reports: "The city doesn't have an ordinance staking out a claim or barring information-sharing with federal officials about a person's immigration status, unlike some cities. But it is among cities that don't enforce immigration laws or honor federal 'detainer' requests to hold immigrants with suspect legal status in jail past their release dates.
- Estes Park police chief Wes Kufeld stated that, "As far as day-to-day policing, people are not required to provide proof of immigration status, and our officers are not required by ICE to check immigration status, nor to conduct sweeps for undocumented individuals. So, we don't do these things." He added that town police do assist ICE in the arrest and detainment of any illegal immigrant suspected of a felony.

==== Connecticut ====
In 2013, Connecticut passed a law that gives local law enforcement officers discretion to carry out immigration detainer requests, though only for suspected felons.

- Hartford passed an ordinance providing services to all residents regardless of their immigration in 2008. The ordinance prohibits police from detaining individuals based solely on their immigration status, or inquiring as to their immigration status. In 2016, the ordinance was amended to declare that Hartford is a "Sanctuary City", although the term itself does not have an established legal meaning.
- In February 2017, Middletown, CT declared itself a sanctuary city. This was in direct response to President Trump's executive order. Middletown's mayor, Daniel T Drew, said: "We don't just take orders from the President of the United States"

==== Florida ====
Florida has banned sanctuary cities.

- In January 2017 Miami-Dade County rescinded a policy of insisting the U.S. government pay for detention of persons on a federal list. Republican Mayor Carlos Gimenez ordered jails to "fully cooperate" with Presidential immigration policy. He said he did not want to risk losing a larger amount of federal financial aid for not complying. The mayor said Miami-Dade County has never considered itself to be a sanctuary city.
- St. Petersburg Democratic Mayor Rick Kriseman said residents from all backgrounds implored him to declare a sanctuary city. In February 2017 he blogged that, "I have no hesitation in declaring St. Petersburg a sanctuary from harmful federal immigration laws. We will not expend resources to help enforce such laws, nor will our police officers stop, question or arrest an individual solely on the basis that they may have unlawfully entered the United States." He said the county sheriff's office has ultimate responsibility for notifying federal officials about people illegally in the city. The mayor criticized President Trump for "demonization of Muslims."
- In June 2019, Florida Governor Ron DeSantis signed a bill that bans sanctuary cities. The bill prohibits local governments from enacting "sanctuary" policies that protect illegal immigrants from deportation and all law enforcement agencies in Florida will have to cooperate with federal immigration authorities. Florida became the 12th state to ban sanctuary cities.

==== Georgia ====
Georgia banned "sanctuary cities" in 2010, and in 2016 went further by requiring local governments, in order to obtain state funding, to certify that they cooperate with federal immigration officials.

- The mayor of Atlanta, Georgia in January 2017 declared the city was a "welcoming city" and "will remain open and welcoming to all". This statement was in response to President's Trump's executive orders related to "public safety agencies and the communities they serve". Nonetheless, Atlanta does not consider itself to be a "sanctuary city". Atlanta also has refused to house new ICE detainees in its jail but will keep the current detainees.

==== Illinois ====
In August 2017, Illinois Governor Bruce Rauner signed a bill into law that prohibited state and local police from arresting anyone solely due to their immigration status or due to federal detainers. Some fellow Republicans criticized Rauner for his action, claiming the bill made Illinois a sanctuary state. The Illinois associations for Sheriffs and Police Chiefs stated that the bill does not prevent cooperation with the federal government or give sanctuary for illegal immigrants. Both organizations support the bill.

- Chicago Mayor Harold Washington issued an executive order in 1985 prohibiting city employees from enforcing federal immigration laws. Chicago became a de jure sanctuary city in 2012 when Mayor Rahm Emanuel and the City Council passed the Welcoming City Ordinance. The ordinance protects residents' rights to access city services regardless of immigration status and states that Chicago police cannot arrest individuals on the basis of immigration status alone. The status was reaffirmed in 2016.
- Urbana, Illinois
- Evanston, Illinois

==== Indiana ====
Indiana has banned sanctuary cities since 2011.

==== Iowa ====
Iowa has banned sanctuary cities.

==== Kansas ====
Kansas has banned sanctuary cities.

==== Louisiana ====
- In New Orleans the New Orleans Police Department began a new policy to "no longer cooperate with federal immigration enforcement" beginning in February 2016. However, according to the U.S. Department of Justice, there is "no evidence" that New Orleans is a sanctuary city.

==== Maine ====
A 2004 executive order prohibited state officials from inquiring about immigration statuses of individuals seeking public assistance. In 2011, the incoming Maine governor Paul LePage rescinded this, stating "it is the intent of this administration to promote rather than hinder the enforcement of federal immigration law."

- In 2015, Governor LePage accused Portland of being a sanctuary city based on the fact that "city employees are prohibited from asking about the immigration status of people seeking city services unless compelled by a court or law," but Portland city officials did not accept that characterization.

==== Maryland ====
- In 2008, Baltimore and Takoma Park are sometimes identified as sanctuary cities. However, "[m]ost local governments in Maryland – including Baltimore – still share information with the federal government." In 2016, Baltimore Mayor Stephanie Rawlings-Blake said that she did not consider Baltimore to be a "sanctuary city."

==== Massachusetts ====
Massachusetts has a pro-sanctuary city law. The Massachusetts Supreme Judicial Court ruled in July 2017 that a person cannot be held solely due to an ICE detainer.

- Boston has an ordinance, enacted in 2014, that bars the Boston Police Department "from detaining anyone based on their immigration status unless they have a criminal warrant." Cambridge, Chelsea, Somerville, Orleans, Northampton, and Springfield have similar legislation. In August 2016, Boston Police Commissioner, William B. Evans re-issued a memo stating "all prisoners who are subject to ICE Detainers must receive equal access to bail commissioners, which includes notifying said prisoner of his or her right to seek bail." Bail commissioners are informed of the person's status on an ICE detainer list and may set bail accordingly.

==== Michigan ====
- Detroit and Ann Arbor are sometimes referred to as "sanctuary cities" because they "have anti-profiling ordinances that generally prohibit local police from asking about the immigration status of people who are not suspected of any crime." Unlike San Francisco's ordinance, the Detroit and Ann Arbor policies do not bar local authorities from cooperating and assisting ICE and Customs and Border Protection, and both cities frequently do so.
- Kalamazoo re-affirmed its status as a welcoming city in 2017. Vice Mayor Don Cooney stated, "We care about you. We will protect you. We are with you."
- Lansing voted to become a sanctuary city in April 2017. It reversed the decision a week later due to public and business opposition. An order by mayor Virg Bernero still prohibits Lansing police officers from asking residents about their immigration status.

==== Minnesota ====
- Minneapolis has an ordinance, adopted in 2003, that directs local law enforcement officers "not to 'take any law enforcement action' for the sole purpose of finding illegal immigrants, or ask an individual about his or her immigration status." The Minneapolis ordinance does not bar cooperation with federal authorities: "The city works cooperatively with the Homeland Security, as it does with all state and federal agencies, but the city does not operate its programs for the purpose of enforcing federal immigration laws. The Homeland Security has the legal authority to enforce immigration laws in the United States, in Minnesota and in the city."

==== Mississippi ====
Mississippi has banned sanctuary cities.

==== Missouri ====
Missouri has banned sanctuary cities.

==== Montana ====
In April 2021, Governor Greg Gianforte signed a bill that bans Sanctuary cities in Montana. Montana became the 13th state to ban sanctuary cities.

==== Nevada ====
- Clark County and Las Vegas

==== New Hampshire ====
On May 22, 2025, Governor Kelly Ayotte signed House Bill 511 and Senate Bill 62, which in January 2026 officially banned sanctuary cities and supported cooperation between state and local law enforcement and federal immigration authorities.

New Hampshire has banned sanctuary cities.

==== New Jersey ====
In 2018, Attorney General Gurbir Grewal issued the Immigrant Trust Directive, which effectively made New Jersey a sanctuary state. In March 2026 Governor Mikie Sherrill signed a bill that codified the directive into state law. Among the municipalities which are considered sanctuary cities are Asbury Park, Camden, East Orange, Hoboken, Jersey City, Linden, New Brunswick, Newark, North Bergen, Plainfield, Trenton and Union City. Those with specific executive orders made by mayors or resolution by municipal councils are:

- Jersey City
- Maplewood
- Newark
- East Orange
- Prospect Park
- Union City
- Highland Park (see:Reformed Church of Highland Park)
- Hoboken

==== New Mexico ====
All county jails are prohibited from honoring ICE detainers, unless they have an arrest warrant signed by a judge.

==== New York ====
New York State has a pro-sanctuary city law.

- Albany – Mayor Kathy Sheehan stated that the city complies with federal law and cooperates with ICE, but she asserted that comments by national government officials show a failure "to understand what is happening in our cities and why a city like Albany would choose to label itself as a sanctuary city."
- Ithaca
- New York City (see also illegal immigration to New York City and ICE and New York City during the second Trump presidency)
- Newburgh declared itself a sanctuary city in March 2017.
- Rochester
- Syracuse
- Buffalo

==== North Carolina ====
North Carolina has banned sanctuary cities. The state restricts any city or municipality from refusing to cooperate with federal immigration and customs enforcement officials. There are therefore no official sanctuary cities in the state. A bill, initially under consideration as of March 2017, is entitled Citizens Protection Act of 2017 or HB 63. Under the new provisions, the state would be able to deny bail to illegal immigrants for whom Immigration and Customs Enforcements (ICE) has issued a detainer; allow the state to withhold tax revenues from cities who are not in compliance with the statewide immigration regulations; and encourage tipsters to identify municipalities which violate these laws. A similar version of HB 63 was introduced in February 2023 during the 2023-2024 session.

==== North Dakota ====
In 2023, the state enacted a law that bans the establishment of sanctuary areas. The measure forbids local governments and higher education institutions from setting policies that inhibit authorities from reporting illegal immigrants to federal officials, or that allow illegal immigrants the legal right to stay in a jurisdiction.

==== Ohio ====
- Cleveland
- Cincinnati's mayor declared the city a sanctuary city in January 2017, in response to a federal executive order limiting immigration issued three days earlier.
- As of 2019, Ohio, Kentucky and Michigan are pushing for 'anti sanctuary cities' measures in their states.

==== Oregon ====
State law passed in 1987: "Oregon Revised Statute 181.850, which prohibits law enforcement officers at the state, county or municipal level from enforcing federal immigration laws that target people based on their race or ethnic origin, when those individuals are not suspected of any criminal activities."

- Beaverton city council passed a resolution in January 2017 stating, in part, "The City of Beaverton is committed to living its values as a welcoming city for all individuals ...regardless of a person's ... immigration status" and that they would abide by Oregon state law of not enforcing federal immigration laws.
- Corvallis
- Portland

==== Pennsylvania ====
There are 17 sanctuary jurisdictions in the state of Pennsylvania. Sanctuary jurisdictions exist in Bradford County, Bucks County, Delaware County, Erie County, Franklin County, Lebanon County, Lehigh County, Lycoming County, Montgomery County, Montour County, Perry County, Philadelphia County, Pike County, and Westmoreland County.

- Philadelphia mayor Jim Kenney said in November 2016 that federal immigration policies lead to more crime, and that crime rates declined the year he reinstated a sanctuary city policy. U.S. Attorney General Sessions has included Philadelphia on the list of cities threatened with subpoenas if they fail to provide documents to show whether local law enforcement officers are sharing information with federal immigration authorities.

==== Rhode Island ====
In 2014, Governor Lincoln Chafee put in place a new policy instructing the Department of Corrections to stop honoring immigration detainers without a warrant.

==== South Carolina ====
South Carolina has banned sanctuary cities.

==== Tennessee ====
Tennessee state law bars "local governments or officials from making policies that stop local entities from complying with federal immigration law." In 2017, legislation proposed in the Tennessee General Assembly would go further, withholding funding from local governments deemed insufficiently cooperative with the federal government. On January 29, 2025, a majority of legislators in the Tennessee Senate voted to adopt SB6002, a bill which "creates criminal penalties for officials who adopt sanctuary policies and subsequently requires their removal from office upon conviction". The act charges a Class E felony, resulting in a potential prison sentence of between one and six years, upon "each official who, in their capacity as a member of the governing body of a local government, votes in the affirmative to adopt a sanctuary policy".

- In Nashville, mayor David Briley, signed an executive order in September 2019 directing city attorneys to investigate grounds for challenging Tennessee's anti-sanctuary-city law. His successor, John Cooper rescinded the order in December 2019, saying that Nashville "cannot and will not be a sanctuary city". Cooper did not support "federalizing the Metropolitan Nashville Police Department", saying that "our police needs to be for us and our local law enforcement and not always being agents of the federal government, the IRS, the EPA, Alcohol and Tobacco or ICE. If they have a non-judicial warrant, that has not ever been before a judge, it needs to be a lower priority for what we need to do."

==== Texas ====
In Texas no city has formally declared "sanctuary" status. A few do not fully cooperate with federal immigration authorities and have drawn a negative response from the legislature. Bills seeking to deprive state funding from police departments and municipalities that do not cooperate with federal authorities were introduced into the Texas Legislature several times. In February 2017, Texas Governor Greg Abbott blocked funding to Travis County, Texas due to its recently implemented de facto sanctuary city policy.

In May 2017, Abbott signed Texas Senate Bill 4 into law, effectively banning sanctuary cities by charging county or city officials who refuse to work with federal officials, and by allowing police officers to check the immigration status of those they detain if they choose. In May 2018, the United States Court of Appeals for the Fifth Circuit found that the law does not violate the First Amendment to the United States Constitution.

==== Vermont ====
In 2017, Vermont passed a law granting the Governor the sole authority to commit state or local law enforcement to enforce federal immigration law. Governor Phil Scott said, "I want to be very clear this law has been carefully crafted through a consensus-building process to confirm Vermont remains compliant with federal law, that we would not be establishing a sanctuary state." Previously, a 2014 law directed local law enforcement to disregard immigration detainers, but compliance was optional.

Since 2016, the state has required police departments to adopt a Fair and Impartial Policing Policy meeting certain requirements set by the Vermont Criminal Justice Training Council. More recent versions have included provisions on non-cooperation with federal immigration enforcement and non-discrimination based on immigration status. Some aspects of this policy have been opposed by local police, especially in Essex County, where federal immigration police act as first responders to 911 calls in northern areas.

==== Washington ====
Washington enacted a measure in June 2019 in favor of sanctuary cities, similar to California and Oregon laws which are among the strongest statewide mandates in the nation.

- Seattle

==== Washington, D.C. ====
Washington, D.C. is a sanctuary city.

== Canada ==
=== Central Canada ===
Toronto was the first city in Canada to declare itself a sanctuary city, with the Toronto City Council voting 37–3 in February 2013, to adopt a policy allowing illegal immigrants to access city services. Hamilton, Ontario declared itself a sanctuary city in February 2014 after the Hamilton City Council voted unanimously to allow illegal immigrants to access city-funded services such as shelters, housing and food banks.

In response to US President Donald Trump's Executive Order 13769, the city council of London, Ontario voted unanimously to declare London a sanctuary city in January 2017 with Montreal doing the same in February 2017 after a unanimous vote.

=== Western Canada ===
While Vancouver is not a sanctuary city, it adopted an "Access to City Services without Fear" policy for residents that are illegal immigrants or have an uncertain immigration status in April 2016. The policy does not apply to municipal services operated by individual boards, including services provided by the Vancouver Police Department, Vancouver Public Library, or Vancouver Park Board.

As of February 2017, the cities of Calgary, Regina, Saskatoon, and Winnipeg are considering motions to declare themselves sanctuary cities.

== United Kingdom ==
Although "sanctuary city" is a North American term, it has been used elsewhere in other contexts. In the United Kingdom, Cities of Sanctuary provide services – such as housing, education, and cultural integration – to asylum seekers (i.e. persons fleeing one country and seeking protection in another). The movement began in Sheffield in 2005. It was motivated by a national policy adopted in 1999 to disperse asylum seekers to different towns and cities in the UK.

=== Sheffield ===
In 2009, the city council of Sheffield drew up a manifesto outlining key areas of concern and 100 supporting organizations signed on.

A city's status as a place of sanctuary is not necessarily a formal governmental designation. The organization City of Sanctuary encourages local grassroots groups throughout the UK and Ireland to build a culture of hospitality towards asylum seekers.

=== Glasgow ===
Glasgow is a noted sanctuary city in Scotland. In 2000 the city council accepted their first asylum seekers relocated by the Home Office. The Home Office provided funding to support asylum seekers but would also forcibly deport them ("removal seizures") if it was determined they could not stay in the UK. As of 2010 Glasgow had accepted 22,000 asylum seekers from 75 different nations. In 2007, local residents upset by the human impact of removal seizures, organized watches to warn asylum seekers when Home Office vans were in the neighborhood. They also organized protests and vigils which led to the ending of the removal seizures.

=== Wales ===
The Nation of Sanctuary (NOS; Welsh: Cenedl Noddfa; CN) is an initiative of the Welsh Government which aims to promote community cohesion and the integration of asylum seekers and refugees in Wales by offering them services and financial and social support covering areas such as housing, language, employment and education. Since its launch in 2019, over 80% of the refugees and asylum seekers supported by the initiative have been Ukrainians who fled their nation after the Russian invasion of Ukraine in 2022, with the rest being refugees from Hong Kong and Afghanistan.

== Biblical sanctuary cities ==
Sanctuary cities in the Old Testament were narrowly applied only to those guilty of unintentional manslaughter as protection against the avenger, perhaps a close relative. Protection wasn't permanent—the manslayer remained until the death of the high priest, then could return home. This system balanced mercy and justice, ensuring the killer was shielded from revenge but not from accountability.

In contrast, modern sanctuary cities extend protection to illegal immigrants, limiting local cooperation with immigration enforcement. Their focus is social justice and community trust, not specific crimes like manslaughter. Though they borrow the biblical term, the scope and intent are much broader.

The only biblical example involving a sanctuary city involved abuses of the system. Joab's brother was killed in battle by Abner. Joab retaliated and murdered Abner in Hebron, a sanctuary city, though Abner was there for political talks, not refuge. Later, Joab himself appealing for sanctuary grabbed the altar horns seeking asylum, but Solomon had him executed for premeditated murder. As Matthew Henry noted, "They that expect to find mercy with God must show mercy to their brethren".

Some theologians interpret these cities and the death of the high priest as a foreshadowing of Christ providing refuge in His death. Matthew Henry wrote that the high priest's death prefigured Christ's sacrifice from the wrath due sin, and Charles Spurgeon called Christ "the true city of refuge". The New Testament echoes this in Hebrews 9:11–12.

== See also ==
- Border barrier
- Closed city
- Conflict of laws
- Justice delayed is justice denied
- List of cities with defensive walls
- Might makes right
- Operation Safeguard
- Perverting the course of justice
- Possession is nine-tenths of the law
- Sanctuary campus
- Second Amendment sanctuary
- US-specific articles
  - Kentucky and Virginia Resolutions
  - Rapid response team
  - Safe-haven law
  - Sanctuary movement
  - Secure Communities
- Separation barrier
- Squatting
