= Rapid response team =

Rapid response team may refer to:

- Rapid response team (medicine), an emergency medical team to act quickly to save lives
- Rapid response team (resistance movement), a network of safe houses to hide undocumented aliens
