= Murder of Jamiel Shaw II =

2008 murder in Los Angeles, California, US

The murder of Jamiel Shaw II occurred on March 2, 2008, in Arlington Heights, Los Angeles, California. Shaw, a 17-year-old Los Angeles High School football player, was shot by two Hispanic men while returning home from the Beverly Center. Shaw was taken to a hospital, where he later died.

A gang member, Pedro Espinoza, was later apprehended and convicted of the murder. Because Espinoza was an illegal immigrant who had just been released from jail, the shooting sparked controversy and political debate over Los Angeles' status as a sanctuary city, and over Special Order 40.

== Backgrounds ==
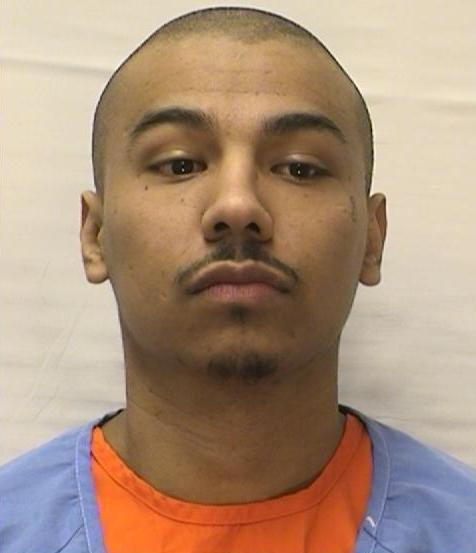
Espinoza in 2012.

=== Jamiel Shaw II ===
Jamiel "Jas" Andre Shaw, II (December 22, 1990 – March 2, 2008) was a junior at Los Angeles High School. He played football, basketball, baseball, the piano, and ran track. On the morning of his murder, he had participated in a weekend football training program that prepares top high school football players for college football and a possible career in the National Football League. Shaw was also being prospected by several colleges, including Rutgers University and Stanford University. Shaw's mother Anita was serving her second tour in Iraq at the time of his death.

=== Pedro Espinoza ===
Pedro Espinoza (born c. 1989) was a member of the 18th Street Gang and was residing in the U.S. illegally. He had previously been arrested in November 2007 on gun charges and assault on a police officer. He was given a four-month early release from jail on March 1, 2008. He murdered Shaw the next day. A day after Shaw's murder, Espinoza reported to his probation officer.

== Shooting ==
In the early evening of March 2, 2008, Shaw returned home from the Beverly Center. He was walking from the bus stop when his father, Jamiel Sr., called him on his phone. Shaw answered the phone and told him he was nearby. He was three blocks away from his home when he was killed.

At about 8:40 p.m., two Hispanic men jumped out of a white car, confronted Shaw, and asked him what gang he belonged to. When he did not answer quickly enough, they shot him. Shaw's father heard the gunshots, ran outside, and stayed by his son until medical personnel arrived. Shaw was taken to a hospital, where he was pronounced dead at 9:55 p.m.

Shaw was first shot in the stomach, causing him to fall to the ground. While he was on the ground with his hands over his head, he was shot through his hands, with the bullet then traveling into his face.

Within an hour of Shaw's murder, Espinoza was found in a park by a Culver City police officer unaware of the shooting. Because the park was closed, he was told to leave. The officer wrote down the license plate number of his vehicle and later shared it with the Los Angeles Police Department. Espinoza was later arrested.

== Legal proceedings ==
Espinoza was formally charged with first-degree murder. He was convicted on May 9, 2012. The guilty verdict also included special circumstances, which made Espinoza eligible for the death penalty. On May 23, 2012, the jury sentenced Espinoza to death.

=== Lawsuit ===
In 2009, the Shaw family filed a wrongful death lawsuit against Los Angeles County and Sheriff Lee Baca. The suit also alleged negligence, violation of the Immigration and Nationality Act, and deprivation of civil rights. In 2010, Los Angeles Superior Court Judge Charles F. Palmer determined that the defendants were legally immune from the action, and dismissed the lawsuit.

== Funeral ==
Shaw's funeral was held on March 11, 2008, at the West Angeles Church of God in Christ.

== Reaction ==
Shaw's murder sparked criticism and political debate over Los Angeles' sanctuary city policy and Special Order 40, which aimed to strengthen community safety by disallowing local officials from questioning a resident's immigration status, thus enabling local victims of crime to file reports without fear of deportation.

In rapper Ice Cube's music video "Why Me?", the Jamiel Shaw case is prominently featured.

=== Jamiel's Law ===
In response to the controversy, the Shaw family supports "Jamiel's Law," which would rescind Special Order 40. Mayoral candidate Walter Moore campaigned as a supporter of this initiative. An attempt to get this proposal onto the May 2009 election ballot failed when supporters did not gather enough signatures.

=== Reaction from victim's family ===
Shaw's parents became supporters of Donald Trump's 2016 presidential campaign. Shaw Sr. was featured in a Trump television advertisement, and spoke at several Trump rallies.

== See also ==
- Colorado sanctuary city controversy
- Edwin Ramos
- Ever Valles case
- Illegal immigration to the United States
- 2014 shooting of Sacramento police officers
- Office of Victims of Immigration Crime Engagement
- Pablo Antonio Serrano-Vitorino
- Shooting of Kathryn Steinle
- Special Order 40
- Illegal immigration to the United States and crime
