= 2023 Tucson mayoral election =

- November 7, 2023
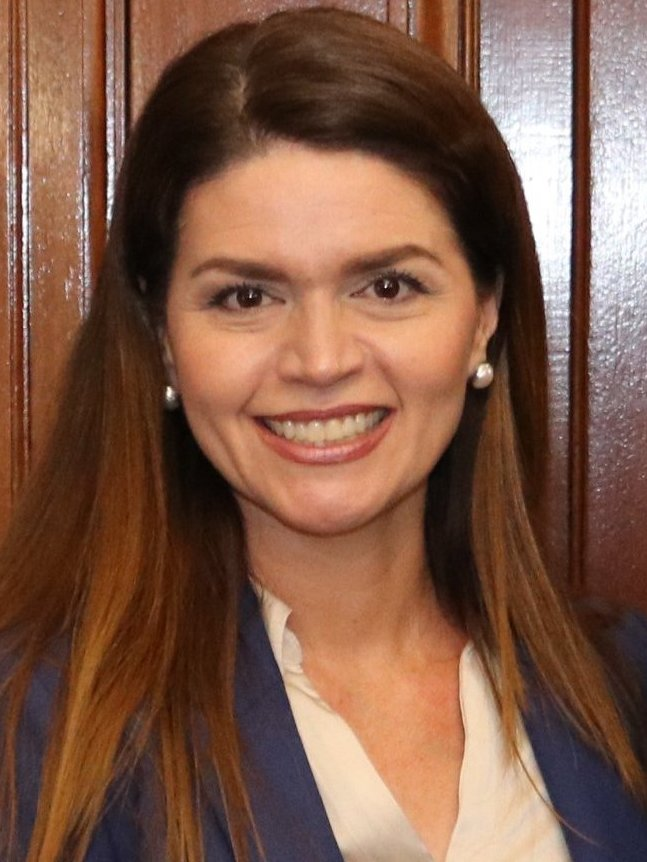

Nominee	Regina Romero	Janet Wittenbraker	Ed Ackerley
Party	Democratic	Republican	Independent
Popular vote	47,749	24,414	5,289
Percentage	60.8%	31.1%	6.7%
- Precinct results Romero: 40–50% 50–60% 60–70% 70–80% 80–90% Wittenbraker: 40–50% 50–60% 60–70% 70–80% >90% No votes
Mayor before election
Regina Romero
Democratic
Elected mayor
Regina Romero
Democratic

The 2023 Tucson mayoral election was held on November 7, 2023, to elect the mayor of Tucson, Arizona. Primary elections were held on August 1. Incumbent Democratic mayor Regina Romero won re-election to a second term in office.

This election coincided with City Council elections in Ward 1, 2, and 4, which incumbent Democrats won. It was also accompanied by the passage of Proposition 413, which would raise the salaries of the mayor and members of the City Council.

== Democratic primary ==
=== Candidates ===
==== Nominee ====
- Regina Romero, incumbent mayor

==== Eliminated in primary ====
- Francis Saitta, retired math teacher (write-in candidate)

=== Endorsements ===
Regina Romero

Organizations

- Center for Biological Diversity Action Fund
- EMILY's List
- Latino Victory

=== Results ===
Democratic primary results
Party	Candidate	Votes	%
Democratic	Regina Romero (incumbent)	35,063	97.25
Write-in		1,126	3.12
Total votes		36,056	100.00

== Republican primary ==
=== Candidates ===
==== Nominee ====
- Janet Wittenbraker, subcontract administrator

=== Results ===
Republican primary results
Party	Candidate	Votes	%
Republican	Janet Wittenbraker	14,941	97.71
Write-in		350	2.29
Total votes		15,291	100.00

== Libertarian primary ==
=== Candidates ===
==== Nominee ====
- Arthur Kerschen, lab specialist at Pima Community College

=== Results ===
Libertarian primary results
Party	Candidate	Votes	%
Libertarian	Arthur Kerschen	204	92.73
Write-in		16	7.27
Total votes		220	100.00

== Independents ==
=== Candidates ===
==== Declared ====
- Ed Ackerley, advertising agency owner and runner-up for mayor in 2019

== General election ==
=== Campaign ===
Incumbent mayor Regina Romero highlighted her handling of the COVID-19 pandemic, housing affordability, and infrastructure improvements. Meanwhile, Republican challenger Janet Wittenbraker emphasized crime, homelessness, and road conditions, and supported anti-panhandling measures and eliminating government waste. 2019 runner-up and independent candidate Ed Ackerley similarly emphasized crime and homelessness, although he specifically proposed increased hiring rates for the Tucson Police Department and creating "homeless transition centers".

=== Endorsements ===
Regina Romero

Labor unions

- International Association of Bridge, Structural, Ornamental and Reinforcing Iron Workers Local 75

Organizations

- Center for Biological Diversity Action Fund
- EMILY's List
- Latino Victory

=== Results ===
2023 Tucson mayoral election
Party	Candidate	Votes	%	±%
Democratic	Regina Romero (incumbent)	47,749	60.81%	+5.09
Republican	Janet Wittenbraker	24,414	31.09%	N/A
Independent	Ed Ackerley	5,289	6.74%	−32.95
Libertarian	Arthur Kerschen	1,074	1.37%	N/A
Total votes		78,526	100.00%	
Democratic hold				

== See also ==
- List of mayors of Tucson, Arizona
