= Executive Order 13768 =

Executive order signed by U.S. President Donald Trump

- Enhancing Public Safety in the Interior of the United States
- Executive Order 13768 in the Federal Register
- Type: Executive order
- Number: 13768
- President: Donald Trump
- Signed: January 25, 2017

Federal Register details
- Federal Register document number: 2017-02102
- Publication date: January 30, 2017
- Document citation: 8799

Summary
- Disqualifies "sanctuary jurisdictions" including sanctuary cities from federal grants.

Repealed by
- Executive Order 13993, "Revision of Civil Immigration Enforcement Policies and Priorities", January 20, 2021

Executive Order 13768, titled "Enhancing Public Safety in the Interior of the United States", was signed by U.S. president Donald Trump on January 25, 2017. The order stated that "sanctuary jurisdictions" including sanctuary cities that refused to comply with immigration enforcement measures would not be "eligible to receive Federal grants, except as deemed necessary for law enforcement purposes" by the U.S. attorney general or secretary of homeland security.

Legal challenges to the order were brought almost immediately after its issuance by San Francisco (supported by the State of California) and a number of other cities and counties. In late April 2017, a federal court issued a nationwide preliminary injunction halting enforcement of the executive order, determining that the localities were likely to succeed on the merits of their challenge.

On November 21, 2017, section 9(a) of the executive order was declared unconstitutional by Judge William Orrick III, who issued a nationwide permanent injunction against its implementation. The executive order was rescinded by President Joe Biden on January 20, 2021.

== Background ==
During his campaign, Trump proposed the mass deportation of illegal immigrants as part of his immigration policy. Jeff Sessions was confirmed on February 7 as Attorney General. Among his first statements, Sessions claimed that, "We need to end this lawlessness that threatens the public safety, pulls down the wages of working Americans."

On August 31, 2016 Trump laid out a 10-step plan as part of his immigration policy where he reiterated that all illegal immigrants are subject to deportation with priority given to illegal immigrants who have committed significant crimes and those who have overstayed visas. He noted that all those seeking legalization would have to go home and re-enter the country legally.

On February 8, 2017, Immigration and Customs Enforcement (ICE) agents arrested 36-year-old Guadalupe García de Rayos, when she attended her required annual review at the ICE office in Phoenix, and deported her to Mexico the next day based on a removal order issued in 2013 by the Executive Office for Immigration Review. The arrest prompted protests from her family and others Immigrant advocates believe that she was one of the first to be deported after the EO was signed and that her case reflects the severity of the crackdown on illegal immigration. ICE officials said that proceedings in Immigration Court had resulted in a finding that she did not have a legal basis to remain in the US. In 2008, she was working at an amusement park in Mesa, Arizona when then-Sheriff Joe Arpaio ordered a raid that resulted in her arrest and felony identity theft conviction for possessing a false Social Security number.

== Provisions ==
=== Section 5 - Priorities for removal ===
Section 5 of the order prioritizes removal of aliens who "have been convicted of any criminal offense; have been charged with any criminal offense, where such charge has not been resolved; have committed acts that constitute a chargeable criminal offense; have engaged in fraud or willful misrepresentation in connection with any official matter or application before a governmental agency; have abused any program related to receipt of public benefits; are subject to a final order of removal, but who have not complied with their legal obligation to depart the United States; or in the judgment of an immigration officer, otherwise pose a risk to public safety or national security."

This provision of the executive order greatly expands the category of people classified as "priorities for removal," making all aliens who have been charged with a crime, or believed could have been charged with a crime, priorities for deportation. The order expands to even those convicted of minor crimes, such as traffic offenses. This marks a change from the Obama administration, which placed the highest priority for deportation on aliens who had been convicted of serious crimes.

=== Section 9(a) - Disqualification of sanctuary cities from federal grants ===
Section 9(a) deals with disqualification of sanctuary cities from receiving U.S. federal grants. Section 9(a) states:

In furtherance of this policy, the Attorney General and the Secretary, in their discretion and to the extent consistent with law, shall ensure that jurisdictions that willfully refuse to comply with 8 U.S.C. 1373 (sanctuary jurisdictions) are not eligible to receive Federal grants, except as deemed necessary for law enforcement purposes by the Attorney General or the Secretary.

It has been successfully challenged in the following cases, where it has been declared unconstitutional:

- City and County of San Francisco v. Trump
- City of Chelsea v. Trump

=== Section 9(b) - Publication of list of crimes by immigrants ===
Section 9(b) deals with the compilation and publication of information about immigrant crime. Section 9(b)states:

To better inform the public regarding the public safety threats associated with sanctuary jurisdictions, the Secretary shall utilize the Declined Detainer Outcome Report or its equivalent and, on a weekly basis, make public a comprehensive list of criminal actions committed by aliens and any jurisdiction that ignored or otherwise failed to honor any detainers with respect to such aliens.

==== Criticism of Section 9(b) ====
While there is evidence that immigrants commit fewer crimes and are incarcerated at a lower rate than native-born Americans, there are very few studies of crime specific to illegal immigrants who are the targets of the order. Critics say that the effort to publicize immigrant crime is an effort to skew public perceptions about crimes committed by undocumented migrants.

Some historians have compared Trump's proposed list of crimes committed by immigrants to the Nazi Germany-era policy of publishing lists of crimes supposedly committed by Jews. Historian Claudia Koonz of Duke University, an expert on Nazi Germany, said that the proposal was deeply troubling and that: "It's tough to make parallels when the scapegoat is so different. But the process is the same. The process was to exaggerate every piece of evidence showing the criminality of the targeted group. Even though it was atypical and not representative, by the media blitz that accompanied it, people began to see it as normal." A number of commentators, including Amanda Erickson of The Washington Post, Christopher Hooton of The Independent, and Tessa Stuart of Rolling Stone also compared the policy of distributing list of criminal actions committed by undocumented immigrants to antisemitic Nazi propaganda that focused on crime in order to stir up anger and hatred toward Jews.

=== Section 13 - VOICE office ===
Section 13 creates the Office of Victims of Immigration Crime Engagement, which operates to assist victims of immigrant crime. The Biden administration replaced the office on June 11, 2021 with the Victims Engagement and Services Line (VESL). https://www.ice.gov/news/releases/ice-launches-victims-engagement-and-services-line-vesl

== Legal challenges ==
=== Legal basis for the challenges ===
The challenges are based largely on the Tenth Amendment to the United States Constitution. This amendment was the basis for the U.S. Supreme Court's decision in Printz v. United States (1997), in which the Court, in an opinion by Justice Antonin Scalia, struck down a law, held that the U.S. government cannot engage in "federal commandeering of state governments." While an emphasis on the Tenth Amendment has historically been championed by conservative jurists, the states and local governments challenging the executive order in this case reflect the amendment's use by liberals.

A federal statute involved in the cases was section 1373 of title 8 of the United States Code. That section provides that "a Federal, State, or local government entity or official may not prohibit, or in any way restrict, any government entity or official from sending to, or receiving from, the Immigration and Naturalization Service information regarding the citizenship or immigration status, lawful or unlawful, of any individual".

Legal scholar Ilya Somin, writing in the Washington Post's The Volokh Conspiracy, wrote:

There are two serious constitutional problems with conditioning federal grants to sanctuary cities on compliance with Section 1373. First, longstanding Supreme Court precedent mandates that the federal government may not impose conditions on grants to states and localities unless the conditions are "unambiguously" stated in the text of the law "so that the States can knowingly decide whether or not to accept those funds." Few if any federal grants to sanctuary cities are explicitly conditioned on compliance with Section 1373.
Any such condition must be passed by Congress, and may only apply to new grants, not ones that have already been appropriated. The executive cannot simply make up new conditions on its own and impose them on state and local governments. Doing so undermines both the separation of powers and federalism.
Even aside from Trump's dubious effort to tie it to federal grants, Section 1373 is itself unconstitutional. The Supreme Court has repeatedly ruled that the federal government may not 'commandeer' state and local officials by compelling them to enforce federal law. Such policies violate the Tenth Amendment.

=== California legal cases: City and County of San Francisco v. Trump, County of Santa Clara v. Trump, and City of Richmond v. Trump ===
City and County of San Francisco v. Trump
- Court: United States District Court for the Northern District of California
- Full case name: City and County of San Francisco, Plaintiffs, v. Donald J. Trump, in his official capacity as President of the United States of America, et al., Defendants
- Citation: No. 3:17-cv-00485

County of Santa Clara v. Trump
- Court: United States District Court for the Northern District of California
- Citation: 3:17-cv-00574

City of Richmond v. Trump
- Court: United States District Court for the Northern District of California
- Citation: 3:17-cv-01535

City and County of San Francisco v. Trump or San Francisco v. Trump, No. 3:17-cv-00485 (N.D.Cal. 2017), were resolved by the United States District Court for the Northern District of California, finding that Executive Order 13768 was unconstitutional on the grounds it violates the Fifth and Tenth Amendments to the United States Constitution, as well as the doctrine on the separation of powers, in line with claims made by the petitioners.

On January 31, 2017 the City and County of San Francisco filed a civil action challenging the executive order on the grounds that it violated the Tenth Amendment of the United States Constitution with regard to State Sovereignty. San Francisco sued the Trump administration over the executive order requiring the federal government to withhold money from so-called sanctuary cities that protect criminal aliens from federal prosecution. The lawsuit filed in U.S. District Court in the Northern District of California alleged that Trump's order violates the Tenth Amendment, which states that powers not explicitly given to the federal government by the Constitution are reserved for the states.

The civil suit alleged three causes of action: (1) Declaratory Relief – San Francisco complies with 8 U.S.C. § 1373; (2) 10th Amendment – 8 U.S.C. § 1373(a) is unconstitutional; and (3) 10th Amendment – Executive Order Section 9(A) enforcement directive is unconstitutional. The suit sought a Declaratory Judgment and Injunctive Relief holding that, (1) 8 U.S.C. § 1373(a) is unconstitutional and invalid on its face; (2) Enjoin Defendants from enforcing Section 1373(a) or using it as a condition for receiving federal funds; (3) Declare that Section 8 U.S.C. § 1373(a) is invalid as applied to state and local Sanctuary City laws, (4) Enjoin Defendants from enforcing Section 1373(a) against jurisdictions that enact Sanctuary City laws for legitimate local purposes; (5) Declare that San Francisco complies with Section 8 U.S.C. § 1373; (6) Enjoin Defendants from designating San Francisco as a jurisdiction that fails to comply with Section 8 U.S.C. § 1373; (7) Enjoin unconstitutional applications of the Enforcement Directive in Executive Order Section 9(a).

Unlike other suits brought in United States district courts across the United States challenging Executive Order 13769, this suit was the first one to challenge Executive Order 13768 on the basis of the Tenth Amendment to the United States Constitution.

On February 3, 2017, Santa Clara County, California filed a separate lawsuit challenging the order on the same grounds. For reasons of "judicial efficiency," both cases were assigned to District Court Judge William Orrick III. The State of California, represented by California Attorney General Xavier Becerra, filed an amicus brief in support of the two counties' challenge. Judge Orrick issued a preliminary injunction with nationwide effect halting implementation of the order on April 25, 2017, ruling that the plaintiffs were likely to succeed on the merits of their challenge.

On November 20, 2017, Judge Orrick issued a summary judgment that ruled Section 9(a) of the Executive Order was unconstitutional on its face and issued a permanent nationwide injunction against its implementation. The judgment concluded:

The Counties have demonstrated that the Executive Order has caused and will cause them constitutional injuries by violating the separation of powers doctrine and depriving them of their Tenth and Fifth Amendment rights. Accordingly, the Counties' motions for summary judgment are GRANTED regarding Section 9(a). The defendants are permanently enjoined from enforcing Section 9(a) of the Executive Order against jursisdictions they deem as sanctuary jurisdictions. Because Section 9(a) is unconstitutional on its face, and not simply in its application to the plaintiffs here, a nationwide injunction against the defendants other than President Trump is appropriate.

— Judge William Orrick, County of Santa Clara v. Trump, at p. 28.

The city of Richmond, California filed a similar lawsuit on March 21, 2017. This lawsuit was also assigned to Judge Orrick.

=== City of Chelsea v. Trump ===
City of Chelsea v. Trump
- Court: United States District Court for the District of Massachusetts
- Full case name: City of Chelsea, City of Lawrence, Plaintiffs, v. Donald J. Trump, President of the United States, United States of America, John F. Kelly, Secretary of United States Department of Homeland Security, Dana J. Boente, Acting Attorney General of the United States, Does 1-100, Defendants.

On February 8, 2017, the cities of Chelsea, Massachusetts and Lawrence, Massachusetts filed a lawsuit in the U.S. District Court in Boston, challenging the validity of the executive order. The Lawyers' Committee for Civil Rights and Economic Justice and the law firm Goodwin Procter represented the cities pro bono in the suit.

The civil suit alleged eight causes of action: (1) declaratory relief that the City of Chelsea complies with 8 U.S.C. § 1373; (2) declaratory relief that the City of Lawrence complies with 8 U.S.C. § 1373; (3) the Section 9(A) of the executive order (the "enforcement directive") is unconstitutionally coercive under the Tenth Amendment; (4) the executive order is facially unconstitutional under the Tenth Amendment; (5) the executive order is unconstitutional under the Tenth Amendment as applied to plaintiff cities, (6) 8 U.S.C. § 1373(a) is unconstitutional under the Tenth Amendment; (7) the executive order violates the separation of powers recognized by the United States Constitution, and (8) the executive order as unconstitutionally vague in violation of the Due Process Clause of the Fifth Amendment.

=== Gonzalez v. ICE ===
Gonzalez v. ICE
- Court: United States District Court for the Southern District of New York
- Full case name: The State Of New York and Eric Gonzalez v. United States Immigration And Customs Enforcement, Matthew T. Albence, United States Department Of Homeland Security and Kevin K. Mcaleenan,
- Decided: June 10, 2020
- Citation: 1:19-cv-08876

While the EO had been ruled unconstitutional in 2017, ICE established the practice of arresting immigrants while they were at courthouses via the 2018 directive, "Directive Number 11072.1, Civil Immigration Enforcement Actions Inside Courthouses", based on the practice established in the EO. The directive asserted that "law enforcement officials routinely engage in enforcement activity in courthouses throughout the country because many individuals appearing in courthouses for one matter are wanted for unrelated criminal or civil violations" and believed this was consistent with long-standing law enforcement policies.

The state of New York, under its Attorney General Letitia James, and the Brooklyn District Attorney Eric Gonzalez filed suit in September 2019 against ICE in the United States District Court for the Southern District of New York related to its execution of the EO. The plaintiffs challenged ICE's on two counts: that civil arrests made at a courthouse violated a common law practice embedded in the Immigration and Nationality Act of 1952 (INA), and that the arrest policy was adopted in an "arbitrary and capricious manner" that violated the Administrative Procedure Act (APA), and sought injunctive and declaratory relief from the ICE's practices. Judge Jed Rakoff rejected ICE's request to dismiss the lawsuit in November 2019, stating that the plaintiffs had a valid claim; "Courts cannot be expected to function properly if third parties (not least the executive branch of the government) feel free to disrupt the proceedings and intimidate the parties and witnesses by staging arrests for unrelated civil violations in the courthouse." Judge Rakoff issued his summary judgement on June 10, 2020, affirming both counts that the ICE policy was illegal and enjoining the agency from performing any more arrests in such a manner in any courtroom in the state of New York. Rakoff agreed with the plaintiffs that the actions had chilling effects for reporting other civil and criminal issues even for immigrants who were not under ICE suspicions; "Evidence proffered by the plaintiffs indicates that substantial numbers of non-citizen litigants, even those who were not themselves subject to these actions, now feared any kind of participation in the legal system, including reporting domestic violence, litigating family court actions, and pursuing meritorious defenses to criminal charges."

== Opposing statutes ==
In response to the executive order, California passed California Sanctuary Law SB54.

== See also ==
- Legal affairs of the first Donald Trump presidency
- List of executive actions by Donald Trump
- List of lawsuits involving Donald Trump
- Legal challenges to Executive Order 13769
- No Sanctuary For Criminals Act
- Office of Victims of Immigration Crime Engagement
