= Texas Senate Bill 4 =

2017 law; bans sanctuary cities

Senate Bill 4

Texas Legislature
- Citation: Senate Bill 4 (PDF) (Bill 4). Texas Legislature. 2017.
- Territorial extent: Texas
- Passed by: Texas Senate
- Passed: 2017-02-08
- Enacted by: Texas House
- Enacted: 2017-04-27
- Signed by: Greg Abbott
- Signed: 2017-05-07
- Effective: 2017-09-01

Initiating chamber: Texas Senate
- Introduced by: Charles Perry

Summary
- Restricts sanctuary cities by mandating that local police must work with federal immigration officials, allows police to inquire about immigration status of detainees.

Keywords
- Immigration, law enforcement, sanctuary cities
- Status: In force

Texas Senate Bill 4 (or Texas SB 4) is a bill that effectively bans sanctuary cities in the state of Texas. It was filed on November 15, 2016, and discussed during the regular session of the eighty-fifth Texas Legislature. Texas Governor Greg Abbott signed the bill into law on May 7, 2017.

The law was the subject of several legal challenges, though it remains in effect.

== Content ==
Texas Senate Bill 4 makes it a Class A misdemeanor for local officials as well as public colleges and universities to refuse to work with the federal government on immigration enforcement. The bill also fines those in violation beginning at $1,000 and climbing up to $25,500 if the individual or entity continues to violate the law. Texas Senate Bill 4 also allows police officers to check the immigration status of those they detain if they choose.

== Bill history ==
=== Background ===
In Texas, no city had formally declared "sanctuary" status, but a few did not fully cooperate with federal immigration authorities and drew a negative response from the legislature. Bills seeking to deprive state funding from police departments and municipalities that do not cooperate with federal authorities had been introduced into the Texas Legislature several times. On February 1, 2017, Texas Governor Greg Abbott blocked funding to Travis County, Texas due to its recently implemented de facto sanctuary city policy. The Travis County incident inspired the passage of Texas Senate Bill 4.

=== Legislative history ===
Texas Senate Bill 4 was first introduced into the Texas Legislature on November 15, 2016. It passed the Texas Senate on February 8, 2017, by a vote of 20–10. The bill then went to the Texas House of Representatives, where it passed on April 27, 2017, by a vote of 94–53, with one representative voting "present." Texas Governor Greg Abbott signed the bill into law on May 7, 2017.

== Legal challenges ==
On August 30, 2017, Judge Orlando Luis Garcia of the United States District Court for the Western District of Texas blocked certain sections of Senate Bill 4 from going into effect, including the part requiring local officials to honor federal detainers. The State of Texas appealed the ruling and on September 25, 2017, the United States Court of Appeals for the Fifth Circuit ruled that those provisions could temporarily go into effect as the court heard the arguments over the case. March 13, 2018, the Fifth Circuit again ruled that most of the law, except for a portion punishing officials who "endorse" sanctuary city policies, could go into effect while the case was pending.

== See also ==
- Illegal immigration to the United States
- Alabama HB 56
- Arizona SB 1070
- Juan Crow
