= Texas Statutes =

The Texas Statutes or Texas Codes are the collection of the Texas Legislature's statutes: the Revised Civil Statutes, Penal Code, and the Code of Criminal Procedure.
