= Steve Farley =

American politician and Arizona state senator

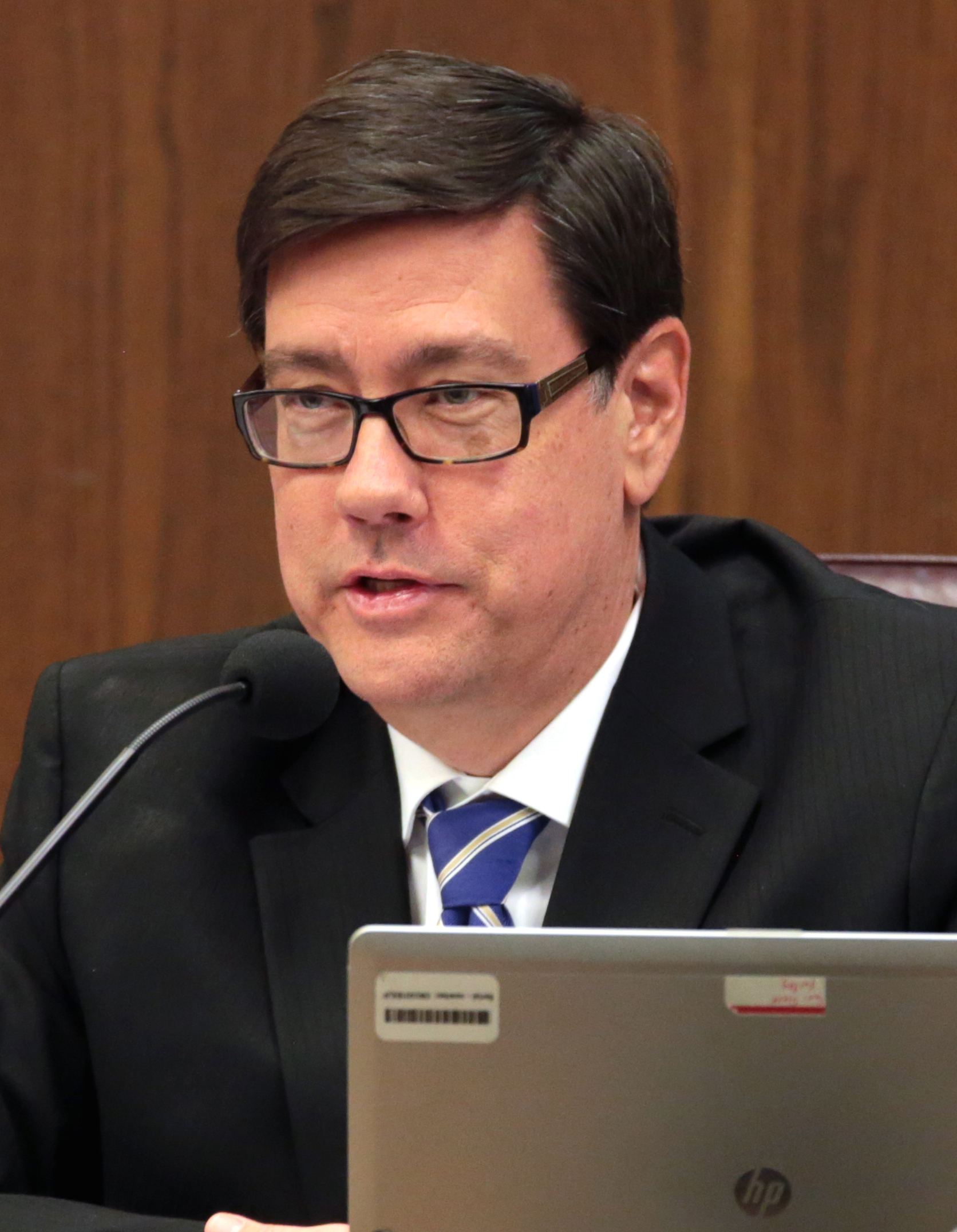

Member of the Arizona Senate from the 9th district
- In office January 14, 2013 – January 14, 2019
- Preceded by: Rick Murphy
- Succeeded by: Victoria Steele

Member of the Arizona House of Representatives from the 28th district
- In office January 2007 – January 2013
- Preceded by: Ted Downing
- Succeeded by: Eric Meyer

Personal details
- Born: December 24, 1962 (age 63) Upland, California, U.S.
- Party: Democratic
- Education: Williams College (BA)

Steve Farley (born December 24, 1962) is an American politician, artist, and graphic designer who previously served as a State Senator from Arizona, including serving in the capacity of assistant minority leader. He also served previously in the Arizona House of Representatives, serving as assistant minority leader there as well. He is a member of the Democratic Party.

On June 5, 2017, Farley announced he was running for Governor of Arizona in the 2018 election, challenging Republican incumbent Governor Doug Ducey, but lost in the Democratic primary. He unsuccessfully ran for the Democratic nomination in the 2019 Tucson mayoral election.

== Early life and education ==
Farley was born in Upland, California to two public school teachers. As a teenager, Farley heard stories of how administrators at his mother's school micromanaged teachers and exerted unnecessarily strong control over classrooms, so he went to the local papers attempting to expose the injustice in his school system. The reporter didn't feel like running with the story.

He graduated from Williams College in 1985 with a degree in political science.

== Career ==
Farley began his foray into politics as a citizen advocate for increased investment in public transportation, and aided in the approval of the comprehensive regional transportation system which created Pima County's Regional Transportation Authority. His advocacy successfully built Tucson’s SunLink Modern Streetcar system and expanded service hours and frequency on the SunTran bus system.

Farley was elected to the Arizona House of Representatives in 2006, and became the assistant minority leader in 2010. In January 2007, Farley was the first legislator in the country to introduce a bill to ban driving while texting; after twelve years of work the bill became law in 2019. In 2011, he proposed taxing marijuana like cigarettes in order to sustainably fund public health and substance abuse treatment programs, but his bill did not become law. In 2012, he was elected to the Arizona Senate. Farley served on the Finance, Appropriations, and Joint Legislative Budget committees where he oversaw the $10 billion state budget. He has also served on the Ethics, Government and Environment, and Transportation committees. He was Senate Assistant Minority Leader and the ranking member of the Senate Finance Committee.

Throughout his time in the Legislature, another focus of Farley’s advocacy was publicizing the size and scope of more than $14 billion of annual corporate tax loopholes given away in Arizona’s sales tax code, including a tax exemption on 4” pipes enacted primarily for the benefit of one company. He gained bipartisan support for rolling back the loopholes.

In 2012, Farley campaigned on issues like investing in new technologies and high-wage jobs, expanding health care for self-employed and small-business owners and making long-term care more affordable for middle-class seniors, in addition to his work in increasing the production of clean solar energy, outlawing driving while texting and protecting Tucson's sovereignty. Farley opposed the controversial Arizona SB 1070 and worked with Governor Jan Brewer to expand Medicaid, bringing healthcare to 400,000 Arizonans. During Farley's last term in the Arizona Senate, he was one of the key Democratic lawmakers who helped the Red4Ed movement gain steam and bring forth a $415 million increased investment in Arizona public schools and a 20% pay increase for teachers.

During his time in the state legislature, Farley put out a weekly Farley Report to inform his constituents on the inner workings of state government. His lengthy blog posts helped explain obscure and complex policies and kept Arizonans up-to-date on state issues.

On June 5, 2017, Farley announced his campaign for Governor of Arizona against incumbent Republican Governor Doug Ducey. Farley lost the Democratic primary to David Garcia. In the campaign, Farley played towards his comprehensive knowledge of the state budget and sold himself as a policy wonk. He proposed closing tax loopholes to secure greater funding for public education, saying "I know we have the money, we've just chosen to give it away," and criticized the Arizona economy for benefiting those at the top more than the average Arizonan.

On January 10, 2019, Farley announced his candidacy for the 2019 Tucson mayoral election. He campaigned on a platform focused on economic development, environmental preparedness, and investment in education and public transportation. He has proposed creating a public healthcare option for Tucson residents, switching diesel engine buses to electrical engines powered by solar energy, creating a resiliency plan for extreme climate emergencies, and preparing Tucson's economy to be competitive in emerging industries. In the Democratic primary, Farley came in second place after Tucson city councilwoman Regina Romero.

In February 2020 Steve Farley became the chief executive officer of the Humane Society of Southern Arizona (HSSA). During his tenure, he built the Freeman Education and Behavioral Center, greatly expanded the Community Cat program, broadened HSSA’s lifesaving work into neighboring Cochise County, led successful efforts to increase the supply of veterinarians across Arizona through the legislative creation of a Veterinary Student Loan Repayment Program, and turned the thrift store into a major revenue generator for the organization, among other accomplishments. Steve Farley was fired from the position on October 5, 2023 when, under his tenure, 318 small pets (including guinea pigs, rabbits, and hamsters) that the HSSA received for adoption placement from San Diego Humane Society were transferred to a private citizen associated with a reptile farm that sells frozen and live animals for snake food.[16] An official HSSA investigation released on November 30, 2023 confirmed that “Farley did not know beforehand that the animals would be sent to [the reptile breeder].”

== Personal life ==
Farley is also an artist whose work appears throughout Tucson, including a ceramic tile mural by the Broadway Underpass, at the eastern gateway to downtown Tucson. Farley work uses copied photographs on ceramic tiles.

Farley is engaged to Kitt Leonard, an IT specialist at the Tucson Medical Center, and has two children.
