= Regina Romero =

American politician (born 1974)

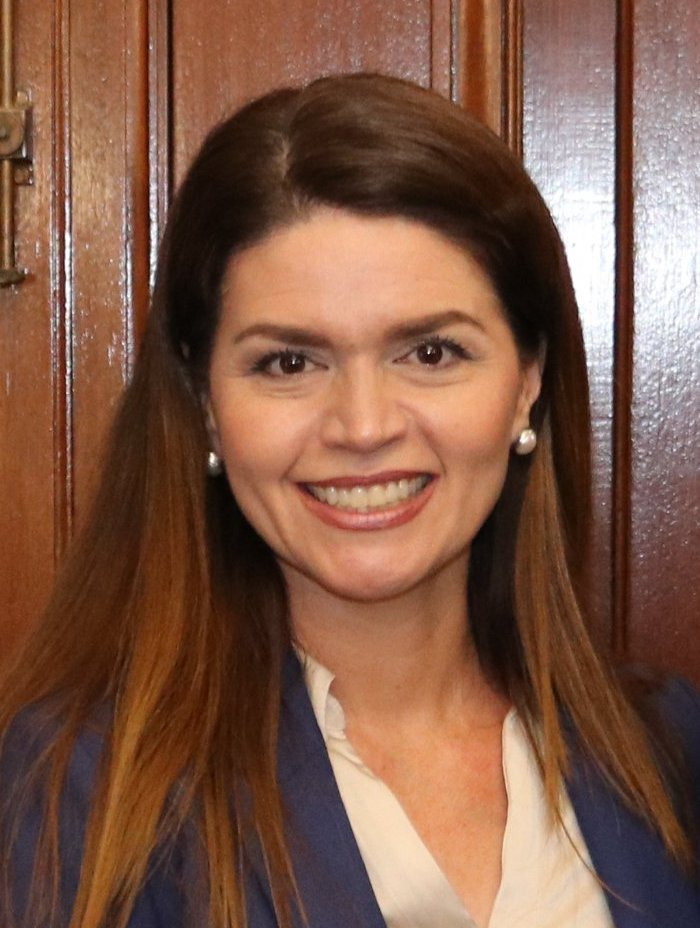

42nd Mayor of Tucson
- Incumbent
- Assumed office December 2, 2019
- Preceded by: Jonathan Rothschild

Personal details
- Born: September 20, 1974 (age 51) Somerton, Arizona, U.S.
- Party: Democratic
- Spouse: Ruben Reyes
- Children: 2
- Education: University of Arizona (BA)

Regina Romero (born 1974) is an American politician serving as the 42nd Mayor of Tucson, Arizona since 2019.

In addition to being the Mayor of Tucson, Romero is the Chair of the Latino Alliance of the U.S. Conference of Mayors, Co-chair of Mayors Against Illegal Guns, an inaugural member of the Mayors Alliance to End Childhood Hunger, and a member of the Climate Mayors Network.

== Early life and education ==
Regina Romero was born in Arizona in 1974. The youngest of 6 siblings, her parents, both farmworkers, emigrated to Arizona from Mexico. Raised in Somerton, Arizona, Romero became the first person in her family to graduate from college and the first to vote. Romero got her BA at University of Arizona and a postgraduate certificate from Harvard Kennedy School.

In 2021, Romero was named Alumna of the Year by the University of Arizona's College of Social and Behavioral Sciences for her efforts towards solving social justice issues and years of public service in Tucson.

== Political career ==
Romero worked as a program coordinator in Pima County, Arizona from 1996 to 2005. From 2005 to 2007, Romero was a council aide for the Tucson City Council. From 2007 to 2019, she was a Tucson City Council member.

=== Mayor of Tucson ===
Romero ran in the 2019 Tucson mayoral election. She won the Democratic primary in August 2019, defeating state senator Steve Farley and developer Randi Dorman. After winning the mayoral primary, her main general election opponent was Ed Ackerley, who was a longtime Democrat running as an independent in hopes of receiving conservative votes. She defeated Ackerley in the general election. Romero became the first-ever female and first-ever Latina mayor of Tucson, and the first Latino mayor of the city since Estevan Ochoa, who was mayor from 1875 to 1876.

In June 2023, Romero's budget proposal for the next fiscal year was approved by the city council. Money was included in the budget to upgrade roads, acquire new public safety equipment, and to keep up the city's fare-free system. $1 million was included to fight climate change, however funds for the effort are much larger when state and federal funding are included.

Romero supported an extension of Proposition 411. Proposition 411 is a 0.5% sales tax designed to generate revenue specifically for residential street repairs which passed in 2022 with 57,024 votes.

=== Re-election campaign ===
During Romero's reelection campaign in the 2023 Tucson mayoral election, she said she wanted to use the city's general fund and the Highway User Revenue Fund to improve roads; continue using federal funds to transition to lower-emissions buses, continue the goal of planting 1 million trees by 2030, and increase water levels in Lake Mead through reservoir usage; and allow non-law enforcement citizens to respond to non-emergency calls. She faced Republican Janet Wittenbraker, and won reelection 61% to 31%.

During her re-election campaign, Romero asked voters to vote yes on Proposition 412. If passed, Tucson would agree to a new deal with the local power supplier that will raise residents' electricity bill by less than $1 a month. She expressed to her voters that this change would help Tucson's fight against climate change, by sourcing electricity in a more sustainable way. Voters rejected the proposition.

In addition, Proposition 413 was passed in the November 7, 2023, election. Romero's salary was increased from $42,000 to $96,000 annually. In the same proposition, the city council's salary was matched to that of the Pima County Board of Supervisors, increasing from $24,000 to $76,660. Voters were split on the issue despite this measure resulting in the first increase in Tucson's salary for the mayor since 1999, and no longer falls behind Tucson's median household income of $48,058. Opponents of Proposition 413 called for staggered increases in salary, instead of the adopted method of immediate implementation.

== Personal life ==
Regina Romero has two children with her husband, Ruben Reyes. Reyes was the district director for the late U.S. Representative Raúl Grijalva.

== Electoral history ==
=== City Council ===
2007

2007 Tucson City Council Ward 1 Democratic primary
| Party | Candidate | Votes | % |
|---|---|---|---|
| Democratic | Regina Romero | 3,333 | 80.51 |
| Democratic | Ken Green | 788 | 19.03 |
| Democratic | Write-in | | 0.46 |

2007 Tucson City Council Ward 1 General election
| Party | Candidate | Votes | % |
|---|---|---|---|
| Democratic | Regina Romero | 42,556 | 72.86 |
| Green | Beryl Baker | 15,551 | 26.62 |
| Write-in | Write-ins | | 0.52 |

2011

2011 Tucson City Council Ward 1 Democratic primary
| Party | Candidate | Votes | % |
|---|---|---|---|
| Democratic | Regina Romero (incumbent) | 4,695 | 76.16 |
| Democratic | Joe A. Flores | 1,420 | 23.03 |
| Democratic | Write-in | 50 | 0.81 |
| Turnout | | 6,165 | |

2011 Tucson City Council Ward 1 General election
| Party | Candidate | Votes | % |
|---|---|---|---|
| Democratic | Regina Romero (incumbent) | 42,411 | 64.74 |
| Green | Beryl Baker | 22,301 | 34.04 |
| Write-in | Write-ins | 794 | 0.19 |
| Total votes | | 65,506 | 100 |

2015

2015 Tucson City Council Ward 1 Democratic primary
| Party | Candidate | Votes | % |
|---|---|---|---|
| Democratic | Regina Romero (incumbent) | 3,506 | 90.92% |
| Democratic | Write-in | 85 | 2.20% |
| Total votes | | 3,591 | 100 |

2015 Tucson City Council Ward 1 election
| Party | Candidate | Votes | % |
|---|---|---|---|
| Democratic | Regina Romero (incumbent) | 45,367 | 55.04 |
| Republican | Bill Hunt | 33,141 | 40.21 |
| Write-in | Write-ins | 261 | 0.32 |
| Total votes | | 3,619 | 100 |

=== Mayoral ===
2019 Tucson mayoral Democratic primary
| Party | Candidate | Votes | % |
|---|---|---|---|
| Democratic | Regina Romero | 24,592 | 50.17 |
| Democratic | Steve Farley | 18,175 | 37.08 |
| Democratic | Randi Dorman | 6,109 | 12.46 |
| Democratic | Write-in | 137 | 0.28 |
| Total votes | | 49,013 | 100 |

2019 Tucson mayoral election
| Party | Candidate | Votes | % |
|---|---|---|---|
| Democratic | Regina Romero | 47,273 | 55.72 |
| Independent | Edward Ackerley | 33,673 | 39.69 |
| Green | Mike Cease | 3,281 | 3.87 |
| Write-in | Write-ins | 615 | 0.72 |
| Turnout | | 84,842 | 100% |

2023 Tucson mayoral election
| Party | Candidate | Votes | % |
|---|---|---|---|
| Democratic | Regina Romero | 47,749 | 60.81% |
| Independent | Ed Ackerly | 5,289 | 6.74% |
| Libertarian | Arthur Kerschen | 1,074 | 1.37% |
| Republican | Janet Wittenbraker, JL | 24,414 | 31.09% |
| Turnout | | 110,575 | 15.95% |

== See also ==
- List of mayors of the 50 largest cities in the United States

Political offices
| Preceded by Jonathan Rothschild | Mayor of Tucson; 2019–present | Incumbent |
