= Special Order 40 =

Special Order 40 is a police mandate implemented in 1979 by the Los Angeles Police Department (LAPD), its Police Chief Daryl Gates and the Los Angeles City Council preventing LAPD officers from questioning people for the sole purpose of determining their immigration status. The mandate was passed in an effort to encourage undocumented aliens to report crimes without intimidation. The first section of the order states:

Officers shall not initiate police action with the objective of discovering the alien status of a person.
Officers shall not arrest nor book persons for violation of title 8, section 1325 of the United States Immigration code (Illegal Entry).

== 2008 incident ==
In 2008, Special Order 40 came under increased fire from conservative commentators Doug McIntyre, Kevin James, Walter Moore and various other figures in the public eye for what they saw as allowing the scenario that resulted in the homicide of Jamiel Shaw II by Pedro Espinoza, an illegal immigrant and gang member. The murder of Shaw was linked to Special Order 40 by its opponents because the alleged assailant had been arrested by Culver City police and then later released by the Los Angeles County Jail, although those two jurisdictions are separate and distinct from the City of Los Angeles and therefore were not subject to Special Order 40.

In the wake of the Shaw murder, the Los Angeles City Council considered amending Special Order 40 with language specifying that police notify immigration authorities if that individual was not in the country legally. Then-retired Los Angeles Police Chief Daryl Gates spoke to the council to defend Special Order 40. He mentioned that the order already mandates that when law violators are arrested, the first thing police are supposed to do is notify immigration if they believe they're undocumented. The order was also defended by then Police Chief William J. Bratton. The City Council eventually chose not to amend the order.

== See also ==
- Arizona SB 1070
- Alabama HB 56
