= Alabama HB 56 =

Anti-illegal immigration U.S. state law in 2011

Alabama HB 56 (AL Act 2011–535), titled the Beason-Hammon Alabama Taxpayer and Citizen Protection Act is an anti-illegal immigration bill, signed into law in the U.S. state of Alabama in June 2011.

The law, written in large part by Kansas Secretary of State Kris Kobach, and cosponsored by Alabama Representative Micky Hammon and Alabama State Senator Scott Beason, was passed by the Alabama House of Representatives and Alabama Senate with widespread legislative support. It was then signed into law on June 9, 2011, by Governor Robert J. Bentley.

== Provisions ==
The Alabama law requires that if police have "reasonable suspicion" that a person is an immigrant unlawfully present in the United States, in the midst of any legal stop, detention or arrest, to make a similarly reasonable attempt to determine that person's legal status. An exemption is provided if such action would hinder an official investigation of some kind.

The law prohibits illegal immigrants from receiving any public benefits at either the state or local level. It bans illegal immigrants from attending publicly owned colleges or universities (currently blocked). At the high, middle, and elementary public school levels, the law requires that school officials ascertain whether students are illegal immigrants. Attendance is not prohibited for such students; school districts are mandated to submit annual tallies on the suspected number of illegal immigrants when making report to state education officials.

The law prohibits the transporting or harboring of illegal immigrants (currently blocked). It prohibits landlords from renting property to illegal immigrants. It forbids employers from knowingly hiring illegal immigrants for any job within Alabama. Moreover, it considers as a discriminatory practice any action to refuse to employ or remove a legal resident of the state when an illegal one is already employed (currently blocked). The law requires large and small businesses to validate the immigration status of employees using the US E-Verify program. The law prohibits illegal immigrants from applying for work. (currently blocked)

The production of false identification documents is considered a crime. Contracts formed in which one party is an illegal immigrant and the other has direct knowledge of that are deemed null and void. The law also requires voters to provide proof of citizenship when registering.

== Legal challenges to the law ==
The law was originally scheduled to take effect on September 1, 2011, but legal actions were taken against it by the Obama administration, some religious groups, student groups (Spanish and Latino Student Alliance), and some immigrant-rights groups, all making claims that the law was unconstitutional.

On August 29, 2011, U.S. Judge Sharon Lovelace Blackburn, sitting for the United States District Court for the Northern District of Alabama, temporarily blocked enforcement of the law, saying she needed more time to study the case. On September 28, 2011, Judge Blackburn gave the green light to key parts of the law.

Less than a month after the bill was signed into law, the Hispanic Interest Coalition of Alabama (HICA) filed the case Hispanic Interest Coalition of Alabama v. Bentley challenging HB 56 on the grounds that various provisions of the act, and the entire law as a whole, are preempted by federal law, and are therefore illegal. HICA was only the first to file such a claim, followed by the United States Department of Justice with the suit United States v. Alabama and a group of Alabama Church Leaders with Parsley v. Bentley. After the U.S. Department of Justice and a coalition of groups including the ACLU appealed that ruling, the 11th Circuit Court of Appeals on October 14, 2011, again put several key provisions on hold until the issues of constitutionality could be addressed, including the requirement on schools to collect information on enrolling students' immigration status. Other provisions, such as those making contracts with undocumented aliens null and void, were left to stand.

U.S. Judge Myron Herbert Thompson, sitting for the United States District Court for the Middle District of Alabama, blocked an additional portion of the law on November 23, 2011, that prevented undocumented immigrants from obtaining certain mobile home registrations.

In a further December 12, 2011, ruling, Thompson attacked the history behind the law, describing the legislative debate as having been "laced with derogatory comments about Hispanics." He said it was likely that the entire law was "discriminatorily based" and that lawmakers employed ethnic stereotypes and used the terms "Hispanic" and "illegal immigrant" interchangeably. He accused State Representative Hammon of having misused a news article to justify a claim that Alabama was home to the second fastest growing population of undocumented immigrants in the nation.

== Impact ==
Once the federal ruling of September 29, 2011 upholding most of the law went into effect, several Alabama school districts reported a significant drop in the number of Hispanic children attending public schools. State and local officials urged immigrants to keep their children in the schools, saying the law does not bar them from attending.

Industries dependent on migrant labor were strongly impacted. Farmers found that Americans are not willing to work under such harsh working conditions for low pay. Some businesses in other industries lost workers, including legal workers, as a result of the new immigration law.

On November 18, 2011, a German Mercedes-Benz executive was arrested for not having proper documentation on him while on business in Alabama, having left his passport at the hotel where he was staying and carrying only his German identity card.

On December 2, 2011, a Japanese Honda executive was stopped in Leeds, Alabama, at a checkpoint set up by police to catch unlicensed drivers. He was ticketed on the spot, despite the fact that he showed an International Driving Permit, a valid passport and a U.S. work permit.

Ahmad Ijaz, Director of Economic Forecasting at the University of Alabama, found that the majority of job growth in 2011 was in the automotive sector – an area of the economy where undocumented workers were uncommon. Ijaz attributed a rise in employment to the retail growth during holiday sales. Contrary to expectation, there was no job growth in sectors where Latinos typically work – construction, agriculture, and poultry processing.

In 2012, a study by Dr. Samuel Addy of the University of Alabama estimated that HB56 could shrink the state's annual GDP by $11 billion or almost 6%, a result of lost sales and income taxes and fall in demand from lost consumers. One study found that "Alabama HB 56 contributed to an increase in violent crime rates, while there was no significant change in property crime rates after the act."

== Calls for revisions ==
On December 5, 2011, Attorney General of Alabama Luther Strange recommended repealing several parts of the law: the provision requiring collection of the immigration status of public school students, the provision requiring immigrants to always carry alien registration cards, and the allowance of lawsuits by state citizens who do not believe public officials are enforcing the law.

== See also ==
- Illegal immigration in the United States
- Arizona SB 1070
- Texas Senate Bill 4
- Special Order 40
