= Rapid response team (resistance movement) =

Network to hide undocumented immigrants from authorities

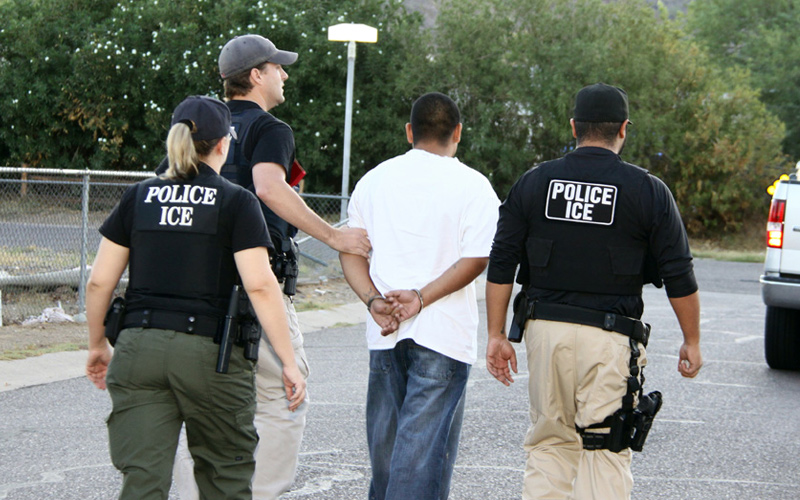
Rapid response teams are a way to hide and shield undocumented immigrants from deportation.

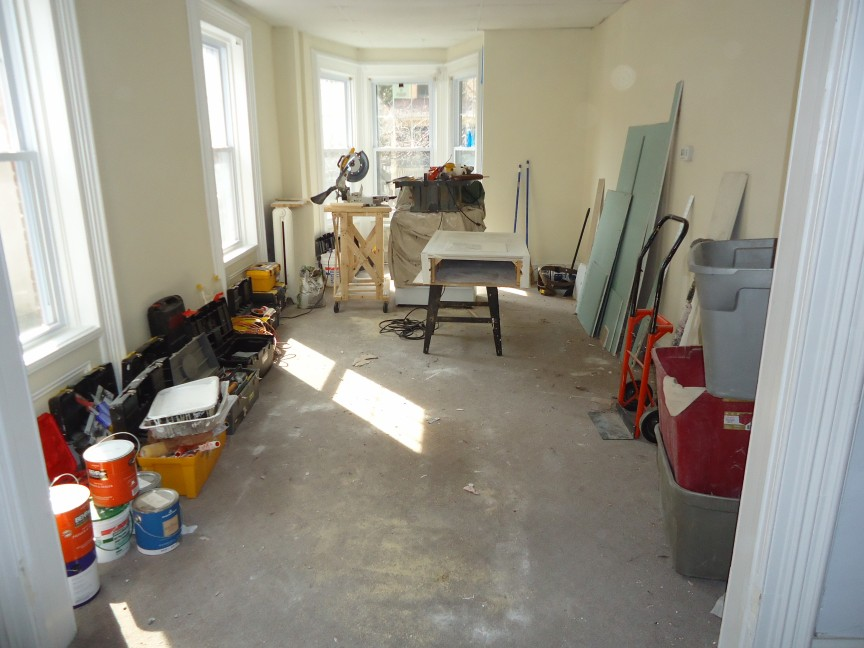
Some volunteers are renovating houses and rooms to make space to shelter refugees.

A rapid response team is a network of safe homes formed to hide and shield undocumented immigrants from deportation by U.S. immigration authorities, along with an effort by the ACLU to provide legal assistance to undocumented immigrants facing deportation by the U.S. Immigration and Customs Enforcement agency (ICE). It is a counter to the threats of mass deportations made by Donald Trump. While it is relatively easy for authorities to arrest undocumented immigrants in businesses and churches, since by federal law such places are considered to be public spaces, it is harder for authorities to enter a private home belonging to a legal citizen, since authorities need to obtain a warrant first before entering. The idea is to make it harder for authorities to find and arrest undocumented immigrants. Rapid response teams are more likely to be organized and led in sanctuary cities such as Los Angeles and Denver. Los Angeles-based pastor Ada Valiente hopes to establish a network of safe homes across southern California and elsewhere.

Rapid response team also utilizes crowdsourced websites, social media, and local alert networks to record, monitor, and announce local immigration raids in an effort to alert local residents of these activities in real time in hopes to warn people to avoid those areas.

Local rapid response teams faces several barriers. Crowd sourced Stop ICE Raids Alert Network has reported their social media accounts received notifications from Meta that law enforcement and DHS has requested information about those accounts. ICE List, a site aimed at identifying agents participating in these deportation raids, had their internet domain suspended by ICANN and later Bluehost.
