= Executive Order 14159 =

2025 executive order on immigration

- "Protecting The American People Against Invasion"
- Type: Executive order
- Number: 14159
- President: Donald Trump
- Signed: January 20, 2025

Federal Register details
- Federal Register document number: 2025-02006
- Publication date: January 20, 2025

Executive Order 14159, titled "Protecting The American People Against Invasion", is an executive order signed by Donald Trump, the 47th president of the United States, on January 20, 2025.

== Provisions and effects ==
This executive order impacts immigration policy. Specifically, it calls for:

- Expanded use of expedited removal, an immigration policy that allows for the deportation of individuals without a court hearing
- Denying federal funding to sanctuary jurisdictions
- Criminal and civil penalties for immigrants who fail to register as undocumented
- Significant hiring increases of Immigration and Customs Enforcement (ICE) and Customs and Border Protection (CBP) agents
- Restricted access to public benefits
- Expanding Immigration and Nationality Act Section 287(g) agreements
- Increasing federal criminal prosecutions for immigration-related offenses.

== Legal challenges ==
On February 7, 2025, San Francisco and 16 other sanctuary cities and counties sued the Trump administration in the District Court of Northern California, seeking an injunction against the implementation of provisions in this executive order as well as Executive Order 14218. On April 24, 2025, Judge William Orrick issued the injunction sought, prohibiting the administration from denying funds to sanctuary jurisdictions or making the granting of funds subject to conditions. When asked to comment on the ruling, Trump responded, "Sanctuary cities are sanctuary for criminals. We should close them down."

== See also ==
- List of executive orders in the second presidency of Donald Trump
- Immigration policy of the second Donald Trump administration
- "Immigrant invasion"
