= 2019 Tucson mayoral election =

- November 5, 2019
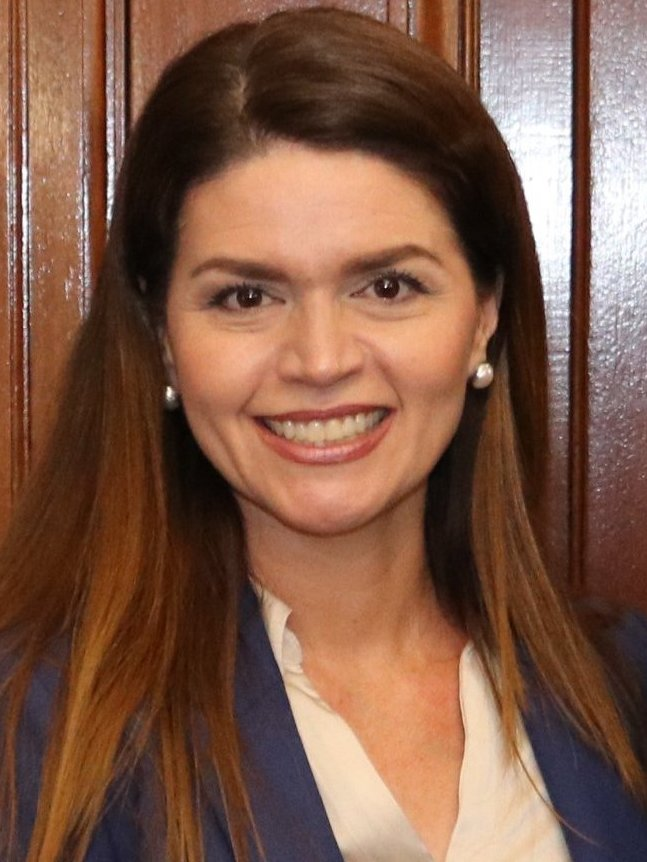

Candidate	Regina Romero	Edward Ackerley
Party	Democratic	Independent
Popular vote	47,273	33,673
Percentage	55.72%	39.69%
- Romero: 40-50% 50–60% 60–70% 70–80% 80–90% Ackerley: 40-50% 50–60% 60–70% 70-80% >90% Tie: 50% No Data
Mayor before election
Jonathan Rothschild
Democratic
Elected mayor
Regina Romero
Democratic

The 2019 Tucson mayoral election was held on November 5, 2019. It saw the election of Regina Romero.

== Nominations ==
Primaries were held August 27, 2019. Three candidates ran in the Democratic primary, one official write-in ran in the Green primary, while none ran in either the Libertarian or Republican primaries.

=== Democratic primary ===
==== Candidates ====
- Steve Farley, Arizona state senator, former Arizona state representative
- Randi Dorman, developer
- Regina Romero, Tucson city councilwoman

==== Polls ====
Poll source	Date(s) administered	Sample size	Margin of error	Ed Ackerley^{A}	Randi Dorman	Steve Farley	Regina Romero	Undecided
Arizona Daily Star/Strongpoint Opinion Research	July 2019	1,693		10%	6%	31%	15%	36%

Not running in Democratic Primary

==== Results ====
Democratic primary results
Party	Candidate	Votes	%
Democratic	Regina Romero	24,592	50.17
Democratic	Steve Farley	18,175	37.08
Democratic	Randi Dorman	6,109	12.46
Democratic	Write-in	137	0.28
Turnout		49,013	

=== Green primary ===
Green primary results
Party	Candidate	Votes	%
Green	Mike Cease (write-in)	91	59.48
Green	Other write-ins	62	40.52
Turnout		153	

=== Libertarian primary ===
Libertarian primary results
Party	Candidate	Votes	%
Libertarian	Write-in	104	100.00
Turnout		104	

=== Republican primary ===
While both Frank Konarski and Sam Nagy filed paperwork to run for the Republican nomination, neither met the signature requirements to get on the ballot.

Republican primary results
Party	Candidate	Votes	%
Republican	Write-in	4,828	100.00
Turnout		4,828	

=== Independent candidates ===
- Ed Ackerley, co-owner of Ackerley Advertising

==== Write-in ====
- Al Pesqueira (identified as Republican), unqualified write-in, withdrew from race

== General election ==
Regina Romero was elected the first-ever female mayor of Tucson, and the first Hispanic mayor of the city since the Latino Estevan Ochoa was mayor from 1875 to 1876.

This is the first time in over 30 years that Republicans have not run a candidate in an open-seat Tucson mayoral race.

General election
Party	Candidate	Votes	%
Democratic	Regina Romero	47,273	55.72
Independent	Edward Ackerley	33,673	39.69
Green	Mike Cease	3,281	3.87
Write-in	Write-ins	615	0.72
Turnout		84,842	100%

== See also ==
- List of mayors of Tucson, Arizona
