= List of third-party and independent performances in United States mayoral elections =

This is a list of notable performances of third party and independent candidates in United States mayoral elections.

It is rare for candidates, other than those of the six parties which have succeeded as major parties (Federalist Party, Democratic-Republican Party, National Republican Party, Democratic Party, Whig Party, Republican Party), to take large shares of the vote in elections.

Listed below are mayoral elections in which a third party or independent candidate won or were reasonably close to receiving 5.0% of the vote (greater than 4.95%). Winners are shown in bold. All elections are organized by state. These lists do not however include non-partisan elections, where the political affiliations of the candidates are not shown on the ballot, leaving no real major or minor party candidates.

== Arizona ==
Notable third party mayoral performances in Arizona
Year	City	Party	Nominee	# Votes	% Votes	Place
1979	Tucson	Independent	John Vargas	18,784	39.69 / 100	2nd
1991	Tucson	Libertarian	Gay Lynn Goetzke	8,172	10.86 / 100	3rd
1995	Tucson	Libertarian	Ed Kahn	6,738	9.21 / 100	3rd
1999	Tucson	Libertarian	Ed Kahn	4,834	5.61 / 100	3rd
2007	Tucson	Green	Dave Croteau	17,962	28.08 / 100	2nd
2019	Tucson	Independent	Ed Ackerley	33,673	39.69 / 100	2nd
2020	Mesa	No party preference	Verl Farnsworth	30,452	33.5 / 100	2nd
2023	Tucson	Independent	Ed Ackerley	5,289	6.74 / 100	3rd

== California ==
Notable third party mayoral performances in California
Year	City	Party	Nominee	# Votes	% Votes	Place
1889	San Diego	Citizens' Non-Partisan	Douglas Gunn	1,817	58.41 / 100	**Elected**
1893	San Diego	Independent	William H. Carlson	1,219	46.78 / 100	**Elected**
1893	San Diego	People's	John Castle	210	8.06 / 100	4th
1895	San Diego	Independent	William H. Carlson	1,090	33.93 / 100	**Re-elected**
1895	San Diego	People's	Daniel Stone	1,015	31.59 / 100	2nd
1897	San Diego	Independent	William H. Carlson	623	17.48 / 100	Lost re-election 3rd
1897	San Diego	People's	Abram C. Mouser	328	9.2 / 100	4th
1897	San Diego	Independent	Henry Sweeney	251	7.04 / 100	5th
1901	San Diego	Socialist	Frank Simpson	157	5.55 / 100	3rd
1901	San Francisco	Union Labor	Eugene Schmitz	21,776	40.71 / 100	**Elected**
1902	Los Angeles	Union Labor	George McGahan	3,211	16.31 / 100	3rd
1903	San Diego	Socialist	Frank Simpson	219	7.3 / 100	3rd
1903	San Francisco	Union Labor	Eugene Schmitz	26,016	43.87 / 100	**Re-elected**
1905	San Diego	Independent	John L. Sehon	2,018	52.66 / 100	**Elected**
1905	San Diego	Socialist	W. J. Kirkwood	438	11.43 / 100	3rd
1905	San Francisco	Union Labor	Eugene Schmitz	40,191	56.58 / 100	**Re-elected**
1906	Los Angeles	Nonpartisan	Lee Gates	8,465	27.0 / 100	2nd
1906	Los Angeles	Public Ownership	Stanley Wilson	8,465	12.37 / 100	4th
1909	San Francisco	Union Labor	P. H. McCarthy	29,455	45.86 / 100	**Elected**
1925	Los Angeles	Independent	Miles S. Gregory	9,540	5.95 / 100	3rd
1973	Los Angeles	Independent	Thomas Reddin	83,930	12.70 / 100	4th
2003	San Francisco	Green	Matt Gonzalez	40,714 (first round); 119,329 (second round)	19.57 / 100 (first round) 47.19 / 100 (second round)	2nd

== Connecticut ==
Notable third party mayoral performances in Connecticut
Year	City	Party	Nominee	# Votes	% Votes	Place
1929	Bridgeport	Socialist	Jasper McLevy	1,968	5.21 / 100	3rd
1931	Bridgeport	Socialist	Jasper McLevy	15,294	35.58 / 100	2nd
1933	Bridgeport	Socialist	Jasper McLevy	22,445	48.64 / 100	**Elected**
1935	Bridgeport	Socialist	Jasper McLevy	24,267	55.74 / 100	**Re-elected**
1937	Bridgeport	Socialist	Jasper McLevy	26,538	67.10 / 100	**Re-elected**
1939	Bridgeport	Socialist	Jasper McLevy	23,113	57.50 / 100	**Re-elected**
1941	Bridgeport	Socialist	Jasper McLevy	22,225	68.00 / 100	**Re-elected**
1943	Bridgeport	Socialist	Jasper McLevy	18,033	65.36 / 100	**Re-elected**
1945	Bridgeport	Socialist	Jasper McLevy	23,202	55.31 / 100	**Re-elected**
1947	Bridgeport	Socialist	Jasper McLevy	20,007	55.31 / 100	**Re-elected**
1949	Bridgeport	Socialist	Jasper McLevy	28,849	53.63 / 100	**Re-elected**
1951	Bridgeport	Socialist	Jasper McLevy	25,781	53.67 / 100	**Re-elected**
1953	Bridgeport	Socialist	Jasper McLevy	24,443	51.26 / 100	**Re-elected**
1955	Bridgeport	Socialist	Jasper McLevy	24,253	47.19 / 100	**Re-elected**
1957	Bridgeport	Socialist	Jasper McLevy	24,219	45.04 / 100	Lost re-election 2nd
1959	Bridgeport	Socialist	Jasper McLevy	14,479	27.93 / 100	2nd
1961	Bridgeport	Socialist	William S. Visokay	10,807	21.12 / 100	3rd
1963	Bridgeport	Socialist	William S. Visokay	5,334	12.20 / 100	3rd
1971	Bridgeport	Socialist	Albert Perrocco	4,959	10.78 / 100	3rd
1973	Bridgeport	Socialist	Albert Perrocco	2,175	5.18 / 100	3rd
1975	Bridgeport	Socialist	Albert Perrocco	3,200	8.44 / 100	3rd
1981	Hartford	Independent	Robert F. Ludgin	6,867	26.73 / 100	2nd
1995	Hartford	Independent	Elizabeth Horton Sheff	1,788	14.95 / 100	2nd
1997	Bridgeport	Reform	Robert K. Pavlick	976	5.98 / 100	3rd
1997	Hartford	Independent	Kenneth A. Mink	999	10.10 / 100	2nd
2001	Hartford	Independent	Robert F. Ludgin	1,863	16.10 / 100	2nd
2003	Hartford	Libertarian	Richard Lion	564	5.62 / 100	3rd
2007	Hartford	Independent	I. Charles Matthews	4,556	34.14 / 100	2nd
2007	Hartford	Independent	Minnie Gonzalez	996	7.46 / 100	3rd
2007	New Haven	Green	Ralph Ferrucci	1,428	11.70 / 100	3rd
2009	New Haven	Green	Ralph Ferrucci	1,720	16.54 / 100	2nd
2009	New Haven	Independent	Angela Whatley	670	6.44 / 100	3rd
2011	New Haven	Independent	Jeffrey Kerekes	6,901	44.65 / 100	2nd
2013	New Haven	Independent	Justin Elicker	9,425	45.34 / 100	2nd
2015	Bridgeport	Independent	Mary Jane Foster	6,029	29.81 / 100	2nd
2015	New Haven	Independent	Ronald Smith	1,070	8.81 / 100	2nd
2017	Stamford	Independent	John J. Zito Jr.	1,260	6.73 / 100	3rd
2021	Stamford	Independent	Bobby Valentine	14,060	47.5 / 100	2nd
2023	Bridgeport	Independent Party	John Gomes	5,550	40.0 / 100	2nd
2023	Bridgeport	Independent	Lamond Daniels	1,836	13.2 / 100	3rd
2024	Bridgeport	Independent Party	John Gomes	4,131	38.1 / 100	2nd

== Delaware ==
Notable third party mayoral performances in Delaware
Year	City	Party	Nominee	# Votes	% Votes	Place
2000	Wilmington	Independent Party of Delaware	Sandra Poppiti	4,476	18.78 / 100	2nd
2016	Wilmington	Independent Party of Delaware	Steven Washington	1,905	6.99 / 100	3rd

== District of Columbia ==
Notable third party mayoral performances in the District of Columbia
Year	City	Party	Nominee	# Votes	% Votes	Place
2022	Washington	Independent	Rodney "Red" Grant	28,467	14.9 / 100	2nd

== Indiana ==
Notable third party mayoral performances in Indiana
Year	City	Party	Nominee	# Votes	% Votes	Place
1963	Indianapolis	Independent	Samuel Unger	10,709	7.5 / 100	3rd
1983	Gary	Socialist Workers	Marie Head	1,238	6.47 / 100	2nd
1995	Gary	Independent	Marion Williams	5,482	18.11 / 100	2nd
1995	Indianapolis	Libertarian	Steve Dillion	7,175	6.47 / 100	3rd
2011	Gary	Independent	LaVetta Sparks-Wade	995	7.47 / 100	2nd
2011	South Bend	Libertarian	Patrick M. Farrell	1,008	6.77 / 100	3rd
2015	Gary	Independent	Eddie Tarver	1,581	15.64 / 100	2nd
2019	Terre Haute	Independent	Pat Goodwin	4,962	40.02 / 100	2nd
2019	Evansville	Independent	Steve Ary	2,119	14.61 / 100	2nd
2023	Evansville	Libertarian	Michael Daugherty	2,032	11.4 / 100	3rd

== Illinois ==
Notable third party mayoral performances in Illinois
Year	City	Party	Nominee	# Votes	% Votes	Place
1879	Chicago	Socialist Labor	Ernst Schmidt	11,829	20.39 / 100	3rd
1887	Chicago	Labor	Robert S. Nelson	23,490	31.27 / 100	2nd
1891	Chicago	Reform	Hempstead Washburne	46,957	28.84 / 100	**Elected**
1891	Chicago	Independent Democrat	Carter Harrison Sr.	42,931	26.36 / 100	3rd
1891	Chicago	Citizens	Elmer Washburn	24,027	14.75 / 100	4th
1897	Chicago	Independent Republican	John Maynard Harlan	69,730	7.02 / 100	2nd
1899	Chicago	Municipal Ownership	John Peter Altgeld	47,169	15.43 / 100	3rd
1905	Chicago	Socialist	John Collins	23,034	7.02 / 100	3rd
1911	Chicago	Socialist	William E. Rodriguez	24,825	6.77 / 100	3rd
1919	Chicago	Independent	Maclay Hoyne	110,851	16.05 / 100	3rd
1919	Chicago	Labor	John Fitzpatrick	55,990	8.11 / 100	4th
1923	Chicago	Socialist	William A. Cunnea	41,186	5.97 / 100	3rd
1927	Chicago	People's Ownership Smash Crime Rings	John Dill Robertson	51,347	5.14 / 100	3rd
1935	Chicago	Third	Newton Jenkins	87,726	8.34 / 100	3rd
1987	Chicago	Solidarity	Edward Vrdolyak	468,493	41.96 / 100	2nd
1989	Chicago	Harold Washington	Timothy C. Evans	428,105	41.12 / 100	2nd
1991	Chicago	Harold Washington	R. Eugene Pincham	160,302	25.13 / 100	2nd
1995	Chicago	Independent	Roland Burris	217,315	36.25 / 100	2nd

== Iowa ==
Notable third party mayoral performances in Iowa
Year	City	Party	Nominee	# Votes	% Votes	Place
2021	Cedar Rapids	Independent	Brad Hart	7,308	28.1 / 100	Lost re-election 3rd

== Louisiana ==
Notable third party mayoral performances in Louisiana
Year	City	Party	Nominee	# Votes	% Votes	Place
2021	New Orleans	No party preference	Leilani Heno	6,605	8.8 / 100	3rd
2022	Shreveport	Independent	Mario Chavez	9,458	18.3 / 100	3rd

== Maryland ==
Notable third party mayoral performances in Maryland
Year	City	Party	Nominee	# Votes	% Votes	Place
2005	Annapolis	Independent	Gilbert Renaut	2,764	36.44 / 100	2nd
2016	Baltimore	Write-in	Sheila Dixon	49,716	22.3 / 100	2nd
2016	Baltimore	Green	Joshua Harris	22,204	9.9 / 100	4th
2020	Baltimore	Independent	Bob Wallace	47,275	20.2 / 100	2nd

== Massachusetts ==
Notable third party mayoral performances in Massachusetts
Year	City	Party	Nominee	# Votes	% Votes	Place
1846	Boston	Native American	Jerome V. C. Smith	735	12.35 / 100	3rd
1848	Boston	Free Soil	Bradford Sumner	929	11.91 / 100	3rd
1848	Boston	Native American	Jerome V. C. Smith	417	5.35 / 100	4th
1849	Boston	Free Soil	Bradford Sumner	349	6.20 / 100	3rd
1851	Boston	Native American	Jerome V. C. Smith	2,736	34.30 / 100	2nd
1852	Boston	Native American	Jerome V. C. Smith	5,021	41.94 / 100	**Elected**
1855	Boston	Native American	Nathaniel B. Shurtleff	5,390	41.95 / 100	2nd
1903	Boston	Socialist	George W. Galvin	5,205	6.7 / 100	3rd
1905	Boston	Populist	Henry S. Dewey	11,608	12.5 / 100	3rd

== Mississippi ==
Notable third party mayoral performances in Mississippi
Year	City	Party	Nominee	# Votes	% Votes	Place
2021	Jackson	Independent	Les Tannehill	2,536	13.4 / 100	2nd
2021	Jackson	Independent	Charlotte Reeves	1,697	8.9 / 100	3rd
2025	Jackson	Independent	Rodney DePreist	6,736	27.65 / 100	2nd

== New Jersey ==
Notable third party mayoral performances in New Jersey
Year	City	Party	Nominee	# Votes	% Votes	Place
1999	Woodbridge	Independent	John Vrtaric	1,012	10.31 / 100	3rd
2005	Atlantic City	Independent	Joseph Polillo	1,162	20.45 / 100	2nd
2008	Atlantic City	Independent	Joseph Polillo	2,448	22.84 / 100	2nd
2009	Atlantic City	Independent	Joseph Polillo	706	12.08 / 100	3rd
2009	Atlantic City	Independent	Dennis M. Mason	289	4.95 / 100	4th

== New York ==
Notable third party mayoral performances in New York
Year	City	Party	Nominee	# Votes	% Votes	Place
1836	New York City	Equal Rights	Alexander Ming Jr.	2,712	10.31 / 100	3rd
1836	New York City	Native American	Samuel Morse	1,496	5.69 / 100	4th
1837	New York City	Equal Rights	Moses Jacques	4,239	12.1 / 100	3rd
1844	New York City	Native American	James Harper	24,510	48.68 / 100	**Elected**
1845	New York City	Native American	James Harper	17,485	35.67 / 100	2nd
1846	New York City	Native American	William B. Cozzens	8,372	17.97 / 100	3rd
1854	New York City	American	James W. Barker	18,547	31.1 / 100	2nd
1854	New York City	Independent Democrat	Wilson G. Hunt	15,397	25.82 / 100	3rd
1856	New York City	American	Isaac O. Barker	25,182	32.39 / 100	2nd
1856	New York City	Independent Democrat	James S. Libby	4,684	6.03 / 100	4th
1859	New York City	Mozart Hall	Fernando Wood	29,940	38.25 / 100	**Elected**
1861	New York City	Mozart Hall	Fernando Wood	24,187	32.52 / 100	3rd
1863	New York City	Reform Democrat	Charles Godfrey Gunther	29,121	40.96 / 100	**Elected**
1865	New York City	Mozart Hall	John Hecker	10,390	12.73 / 100	3rd
1865	New York City	McKeon Democracy	Charles Godfrey Gunther	6,758	8.28 / 100	4th
1867	New York City	Mozart Hall	Fernando Wood	22,837	21.88 / 100	2nd
1872	New York City	Reform Democrat	James O'Brien	31,121	23.88 / 100	3rd
1874	New York City	Liberal Democrat	Oswald Ottendorfer	24,226	18.45 / 100	3rd
1878	New York City	New York County Democracy	Edward Cooper	79,986	56.02 / 100	**Elected**
1884	New York City	New York County Democracy	William Russell Grace	96,288	42.13 / 100	**Elected**
1886	New York City	United Labor	Henry George	68,110	31.01 / 100	2nd
1888	New York City	New York County Democracy	Abram Hewitt	71,979	26.42 / 100	3rd
1895	Brooklyn	Reform Democrat	Edward M. Shepard	9,510	5.66 / 100	3rd
1897	New York City	Citizens Union	Seth Low	151,540	28.83 / 100	2nd
1905	New York City	Municipal Ownership	William Randolph Hearst	224,929	37.16 / 100	2nd
1909	New York City	Civic Alliance	William Randolph Hearst	154,187	25.88 / 100	3rd
1913	Buffalo	Progressive	John Lord O'Brian	23,757	35.24 / 100	2nd
1913	New York City	Socialist	Charles Edward Russell	32,205	5.12 / 100	3rd
1915	Schenectady	Socialist	George R. Lunn	6,069	40.81 / 100	**Elected**
1917	New York City	Fusion	John Purroy Mitchel	155,497	23.1 / 100	2nd
1917	New York City	Socialist	Morris Hillquit	145,332	21.59 / 100	3rd
1921	New York City	Socialist	Jacob Panken	82,607	7.06 / 100	3rd
1929	Buffalo	Socialist	Frank Perkins	8,785	5.64 / 100	3rd
1929	New York City	Socialist	Norman Thomas	175,697	12.29 / 100	3rd
1932	New York City	Socialist	Morris Hillquit	249,887	12.37 / 100	3rd
1932	New York City	Independent (Write-In)	Joseph V. McKee	234,372	11.6 / 100	4th
1933	New York City	Recovery	Joseph V. McKee	609,053	28.3 / 100	2nd
1937	Buffalo	Erie County Pole	Joseph Kaszubowski	11,392	5.54 / 100	3rd
1945	Buffalo	People's	Frank X. Schwab	35,257	19.8 / 100	3rd
1945	New York City	No Deal	Newbold Morris	408,408	20.6 / 100	3rd
1949	New York City	American Labor	Vito Marcantonio	356,625	13.76 / 100	3rd
1950	New York City	Experience	Vincent R. Impellitteri	1,161,175	44.21 / 100	**Re-elected**
1953	New York City	Liberal	Rudolph Halley	467,104	21.16 / 100	3rd
1957	Buffalo	Independent	Elmer Lux	45,759	23.82 / 100	3rd
1961	Buffalo	Citizens	Frank A. Sedita	62,196	31.56 / 100	2nd
1961	New York City	Citizens	Lawrence E. Gerosa	321,604	13.26 / 100	3rd
1965	New York City	Conservative	William F. Buckley Jr.	341,226	13.36 / 100	3rd
1967	Yonkers	Conservative	Nicholas DiCostanzo	5,802	6.99 / 100	3rd
1969	New York City	Liberal	John Lindsay	1,012,633	42.36 / 100	**Re-elected**
1969	Yonkers	Conservative	Matthew Hollohan	4,249	5.42 / 100	3rd
1973	New York City	Liberal	Albert H. Blumenthal	262,600	15.4 / 100	3rd
1973	New York City	Conservative	Mario Biaggi	186,977	10.96 / 100	4th
1977	Albany	Liberal	Howard C. Nolan	2,446	7.37 / 100	3rd
1977	Buffalo	Conservative	James D. Griffin	57,642	41.97 / 100	**Elected**
1977	New York City	Liberal	Mario Cuomo	587,913	40.97 / 100	2nd
1981	Buffalo	Liberal	Alfred Coppola	7,869	9.81 / 100	2nd
1981	New York City	Unity	Frank J. Barbaro	162,719	13.31 / 100	2nd
1981	New York City	Conservative	John A. Esposito	60,100	4.92 / 100	3rd
1981	Syracuse	Conservative	Melvin N. Zimmer	2,772	5.49 / 100	
1983	Yonkers	Conservative	Carlo Calvi	7,736	13.74 / 100	3rd
1983	Yonkers	Independent Taxpayers	Charles A. Cola	6,764	7.97 / 100	4th
1985	New York City	Liberal	Carol Bellamy	113,471	10.2 / 100	2nd
1989	Buffalo	Independent (Write-In)	Wilbur P. Trammell	11,033	16.27 / 100	2nd
1989	Buffalo	Liberal	William B. Hoyt	9,632	14.2 / 100	3rd
1989	Rochester	Independent	John G. Erb	5,503	14.21 / 100	3rd
1991	Yonkers	Independent	Angelo Martinelli	13,093	28.22 / 100	3rd
1993	Buffalo	Conservative	Eugene M. Fahey	7,566	14.29 / 100	3rd
1993	Rochester	Independent	Kevin B. Murray	2,489	6.37 / 100	3rd
1997	Albany	Liberal	John McEneny	4,462	21.41 / 100	2nd
1997	Buffalo	Right to Life	James D. Griffin	16,539	23.15 / 100	2nd
1997	Buffalo	Liberal	James Pitts	11,424	15.99 / 100	3rd
2001	Syracuse	Green	Jennifer Daniels	2,442	7.60 / 100	3rd
2003	New Rochelle	Working Families	Linda Levine	2,121	14.55 / 100	3rd
2003	Yonkers	Independence	Michael J. Spano	2,570	7.03 / 100	3rd
2005	Albany	Green	Alice Green	5,548	8.74 / 100	2nd
2005	Rochester	Working Families	Tim Mains	3,786	10.36 / 100	3rd
2009	Albany	Working Families	Corey Ellis	4,801	29.19 / 100	2nd
2009	New York City	Independent	Michael Bloomberg	585,470	50.7 / 100	**Re-elected**
2009	Syracuse	Conservative (NY)	Otis Jennings	2,448	10.42 / 100	3rd
2011	Rochester	Working Families	William A. Johnson Jr.	10,732	42.21 / 100	2nd
2011	Rochester	Green	Alex White	2,221	8.74 / 100	3rd
2011	Yonkers	Independence	Carlo Calvi	3,015	10.26 / 100	3rd
2013	Rochester	Independence	Thomas Richards	13,415	39.46 / 100	2nd
2013	Rochester	Green	Alex White	1,784	5.25 / 100	3rd
2015	New Rochelle	Independence	James A. O'Toole	3,548	38.30 / 100	2nd
2017	Buffalo	Reform	Mark J. F. Schroeder	11,446	26.09 / 100	2nd
2017	Syracuse	Independence	Ben Walsh	13,584	53.21 / 100	**Elected**
2021	Albany	Independence	Gregory J. Aidala	2,374	16.9 / 100	3rd
2021	Buffalo	Write-in	Byron Brown	38,108	59.4 / 100	**Re-elected**
2021	Syracuse	Independence	Ben Walsh	13,584	59.6 / 100	**Re-elected**
2025	New York City	Independent (Affiliated with Democrat)	Andrew Cuomo	834,693	41.6 / 100	2nd

== Ohio ==
Notable third party mayoral performances in Ohio
Year	City	Party	Nominee	# Votes	% Votes	Place
1965	Cleveland	Independent	Carl Stokes	87,716	36.66 / 100	2nd
1965	Cleveland	Independent	Ralph A. McAllister	22,650	9.47 / 100	4th
1971	Cleveland	Independent	Arnold R. Pinkey	72,785	31.76 / 100	2nd
2013	Youngstown	Independent	DeMaine J. Kitchen	4,582	43.26 / 100	2nd
2017	Youngstown	Independent	Sean McKinney	5,127	45.44 / 100	2nd
2017	Youngstown	Independent	Janet Tarpley	723	6.41 / 100	3rd

== Oklahoma ==
Notable third party mayoral performances in Oklahoma
Year	City	Party	Nominee	# Votes	% Votes	Place
1911	Oklahoma City	Socialist	Oscar Ameringer	1,876	22.7 / 100	3rd

== Pennsylvania ==
Notable third party mayoral performances in Pennsylvania
Year	City	Party	Nominee	# Votes	% Votes	Place
1852	Philadelphia	Independent	William Badger	4,328	31.99 / 100	2nd
1874	Philadelphia	Independent	Alexander McClure	49,133	44.97 / 100	2nd
1909	Pittsburgh	Civic / Prohibition	William H. Stevenson	17,008	24.6 / 100	2nd
1915	Philadelphia	Franklin	George D. Porter	88,135	33.96 / 100	2nd
1919	Philadelphia	Charter	Joseph S. McLaughlin	17,900	6.34 / 100	3rd
1925	Pittsburgh	Independent	William L. Smith	15,210	16.7 / 100	2nd
1927	Philadelphia	Citizens	J. Hampton Moore	128,611	29.29 / 100	2nd
1975	Philadelphia	Independent	Charles W. Bowser	138,783	24.61 / 100	2nd
1977	Pittsburgh	Independent	Richard Caliguiri	68,902	47.9 / 100	**Elected**
1979	Philadelphia	Consumer's	Lucien E. Blackwell	103,620	17.38 / 100	3rd
1983	Philadelphia	Independent	Thomas Leonard	57,146	7.97 / 100	2nd
2001	Harrisburg	Green	Diane F. White	1,070	17.50 / 100	2nd
2009	Scranton	Independent	Gary A. DiBileo	6,058	41.69 / 100	3rd
2013	Allentown	Independent	W. Michael Donovan	3,602	38.13 / 100	2nd
2013	Harrisburg	Independent	Aaron Johnson	1,334	18.31 / 100	3rd
2025	Renovo Borough	Libertarian	Justin Lynn	159	60.7 / 100	**Elected**
2025	Scranton	Independent	Eugene Barrett	3,553	20.90 / 100	3rd

== Rhode Island ==
Notable third party mayoral performances in Rhode Island
Year	City	Party	Nominee	# Votes	% Votes	Place
1990	Providence	Independent	Buddy Cianci	16,416	34.99 / 100	**Elected**
1990	Providence	Independent	Frederick Lippitt	16,099	34.32 / 100	2nd
1994	Providence	Independent	Buddy Cianci	20,510	55.47 / 100	**Re-elected**
1994	Providence	Independent	Paul Jabour	14,955	40.44 / 100	2nd
1998	Providence	Independent	Buddy Cianci	23,746	34.99 / 100	**Re-elected**
2004	Warwick	Independent	Carlo E. Pisaturo Jr.	2,623	6.73 / 100	3rd
2008	Pawtucket	Independent	Donald R. Grebien	10,478	46.14 / 100	2nd
2010	Providence	Independent	Jonathan Scott	6,006	17.91 / 100	2nd
2012	Warwick	Independent	John Kirby	6,917	18.41 / 100	2nd
2014	Providence	Independent	Buddy Cianci	17,306	45.04 / 100	2nd
2014	Warwick	Independent	Kevin C. Eisemann	1,870	6.22 / 100	3rd
2016	Pawtucket	Independent	John T. Arcaro	5,090	24.51 / 100	2nd
2018	Pawtucket	Independent	David F. Norton	4,737	28.59 / 100	2nd
2018	Providence	Independent	Dianne S. Witman	14,016	33.11 / 100	2nd
2020	Warwick	Independent	Frank Picozzi	26,625	59.12 / 100	**Elected**

== South Carolina ==
Notable third party mayoral performances in South Carolina
Year	City	Party	Nominee	# Votes	% Votes	Place
1975	Charleston	Independent	J. Kenneth Rentiers	1,602	10.71 / 100	3rd
1975	Charleston	Independent	George Fuller	1,017	6.80 / 100	4th
1999	Charleston	Independent	Maurice Washington	5,126	28.89 / 100	2nd
2025	Georgetown	Forward	Jay Doyle	1,244	55.91 / 100	**Elected**

== Vermont ==
Notable third party mayoral performances in Vermont
Year	City	Party	Nominee	# Votes	% Votes	Place
1981	Burlington	Independent	Bernie Sanders	4,030	43.43 / 100	**Elected**
1981	Burlington	Independent	Richard Bove	1,091	11.76 / 100	3rd
1983	Burlington	Independent	Bernie Sanders	6,942	52.12 / 100	**Re-elected**
1985	Burlington	Independent	Bernie Sanders	5,760	56.09 / 100	**Re-elected**
1985	Burlington	Independent	Diane Gallagher	1,234	12.02 / 100	3rd
1987	Burlington	Independent	Bernie Sanders	6,759	55.89 / 100	**Re-elected**
1989	Burlington	Independent	Peter Clavelle	5,626	56.11 / 100	**Elected**
1993	Burlington	Independent	Peter Clavelle	4,579	46.49 / 100	Lost re-election 2nd
1995	Burlington	Independent	Peter Clavelle	N/A	N/A	**Elected**
1999	Burlington	Progressive	Peter Clavelle	5,829	60.32 / 100	**Re-elected as Progressive**
2001	Burlington	Progressive	Peter Clavelle	3,426	55.18 / 100	**Re-elected**
2003	Burlington	Progressive	Peter Clavelle	9,270	63.69 / 100	**Re-elected**
2003	Burlington	Independent	Unknown (Write-In)	2,660	18.28 / 100	2nd
2006	Burlington	Progressive	Bob Kiss	4,761	41.29 / 100	**Elected**
2009	Burlington	Progressive	Bob Kiss	2,585	28.8 / 100	2nd
2009	Burlington	Independent	Dan Smith	1,306	14.55 / 100	4th
2009	Burlington	Progressive	Bob Kiss	2,981	33.76 / 100	2nd
2009	Burlington	Progressive	Bob Kiss	4,313	51.5 / 100	**Re-elected**
2012	Burlington	Independent	Wanda Hines	506	5.03 / 100	3rd
2015	Burlington	Progressive	Steven Goodkind	1,716	22.35 / 100	2nd
2015	Burlington	Independent	Greg Guma	508	6.62 / 100	3rd
2018	Burlington	Progressive	Carina Driscoll	4,155	34.96 / 100	2nd
2018	Burlington	Independent	Infinite Culcleasure	1,910	16.07 / 100	3rd
2021	Burlington	Progressive	Max Tracy	6,060	42.1 / 100	2nd
2021	Burlington	Independent	Ali Dieng	1,830	12.7 / 100	3rd
2024	Burlington	Progressive	Emma Mulvaney-Stanak	7,612	51.4 / 100	**Elected**

== Virginia ==
Notable third party mayoral performances in Virginia
Year	City	Party	Nominee	# Votes	% Votes	Place
1961	Alexandria	Independent	Frank E. Mann	4,122	55.20 / 100	**Elected**
1967	Alexandria	Independent	Fitzhugh Lee Opie	3,738	39.57 / 100	2nd
1996	Alexandria	Independent	Charles Stanard Severance	490	8.59 / 100	2nd
2000	Alexandria	Independent	Robert R. Peavey	6,223	36.72 / 100	2nd
2003	Alexandria	Independent	Townsend A. Van Fleet	1,315	6.58 / 100	3rd
2012	Alexandria	Independent	Andrew MacDonald	25,988	39.91 / 100	2nd

== Wisconsin ==
Notable third party mayoral performances in Wisconsin
Year	City	Party	Nominee	# Votes	% Votes	Place
1902	Milwaukee	Socialist	Howard Tuttle	8,373	14.4 / 100	3rd
1910	Milwaukee	Socialist	Emil Seidel	27,622	46.5 / 100	**Elected**
