= List of mayors of Tucson, Arizona =

Mayor of Tucson, Arizona

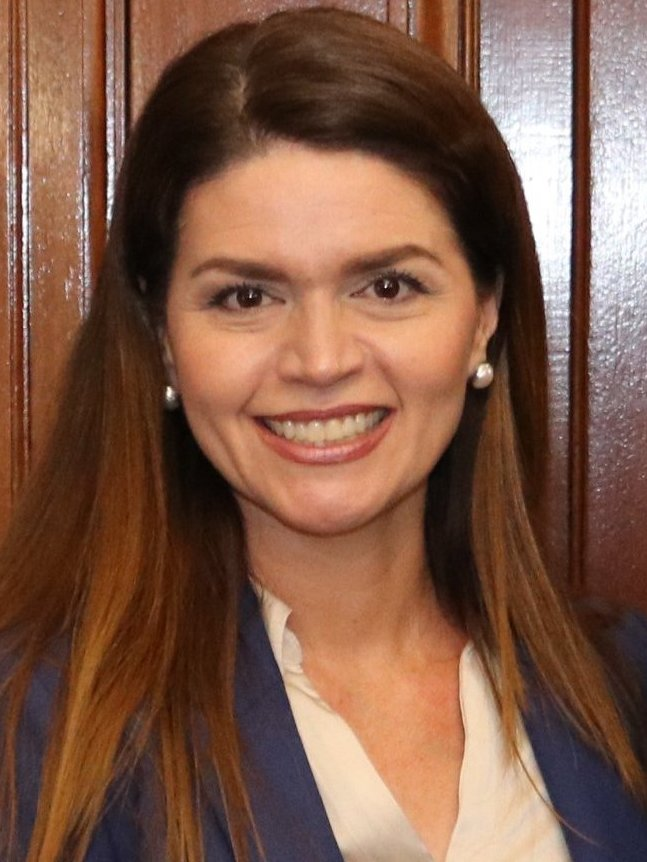
- Incumbent; Regina Romero since December 2, 2019
- Inaugural holder: Sidney Randolph DeLong
- Formation: 19th century
- Website: www.tucsonaz.gov

Alcalde	Term
Mark Aldrich	1861

Mayor	Term	Political party
Sidney Randolph DeLong	May 17, 1871 – January 6, 1873	Republican (two one-year terms)
James Henry Toole	January 6, 1873 – January 5, 1875	(two one-year terms)
Estevan Ochoa	January 5, 1875 – January 11, 1876	(replaced by J. B Allen 5/1/76)
John Brackett "Pie" Allen	May 1, 1876 – January 1, 1878	
James Henry Toole	January 1, 1878 – January 6, 1880	(third & fourth terms)
Robert N. Leatherwood	January 6, 1880 – January 11, 1881	Democratic
John Sterling Carr	January 11, 1881 – January 10, 1882	
Pinckney R. Tully	January 10, 1882 – January 9, 1883	
Charles M. Strauss	January 9, 1883 – August 5, 1884	(resigned August 5, 1884)
Charles T. Etchell	August 5, 1884 – August 7, 1884	(mayor pro tem)
Andrew Cronley	August 7, 1884 – May 5, 1885	(mayor pro tem)
George Rayfield	May 5, 1885 – November 10, 1887	
William E. Stevens	November 10, 1887 – January 7, 1889	
Frederick Maish	January 7, 1889 – January 18, 1893	
William J. Perry	January 18, 1893 – January 7, 1895	
Henry Buehman	January 7, 1895 – January 3, 1899	Republican
Gustav A. Hoff	January 3, 1899 – January 7, 1901	Democratic
Charles J. Schumacher	January 7, 1901 – January 2, 1905	
Levi H. Manning	January 2, 1905 – January 7, 1907	
Charles F. Slack	January 7, 1907 – January 4, 1909	Republican
Ben Heney	January 4, 1909 – January 3, 1910	Republican
Preston N. Jacobus	January 3, 1910 – January 2, 1912	Republican
Ira Erven Huffman	January 2, 1912 – January 4, 1915	Democratic
Johnston Knox Corbett	January 4, 1915 – January 2, 1917	Republican
Olva Clayton Parker	January 2, 1917 – January 7, 1926	
John E. White	January 7, 1926 – January 7, 1929	
W. A. Julian	January 7, 1929 – January 5, 1931	
George K. Smith	January 5, 1931 – May 1, 1933	
Henry O. Jaastad	May 1, 1933 – May 5, 1947	Democratic
Elbert Thompson Houston	May 5, 1947 – June 13, 1950	
J. O. Niemann	June 13, 1950 – May 7, 1951	(acting)
Fred Artemas Emery Jr.	May 7, 1951 – May 2, 1955	
Don Hummel	May 2, 1955 – December 4, 1961	Democratic
Lewis Walter Davis	December 4, 1961 – December 4, 1967	Republican
James Nielson “Jim” Corbett Jr.	December 4, 1967 – December 6, 1971	Democratic
Lewis C. Murphy	December 6, 1971 – December 7, 1987	Republican
Tom Volgy	December 7, 1987 – December 2, 1991	Democratic
George Miller	December 2, 1991 – December 6, 1999	Democratic
Robert E. Walkup	December 6, 1999 – December 11, 2011	Republican
Jonathan Rothschild	December 11, 2011 – December 2, 2019	Democratic
Regina Romero	December 2, 2019 – present	Democratic (incumbent)

== See also ==
- List of mayors of the 50 largest cities in the United States
