= Bob Walkup =

American politician (1936–2021)

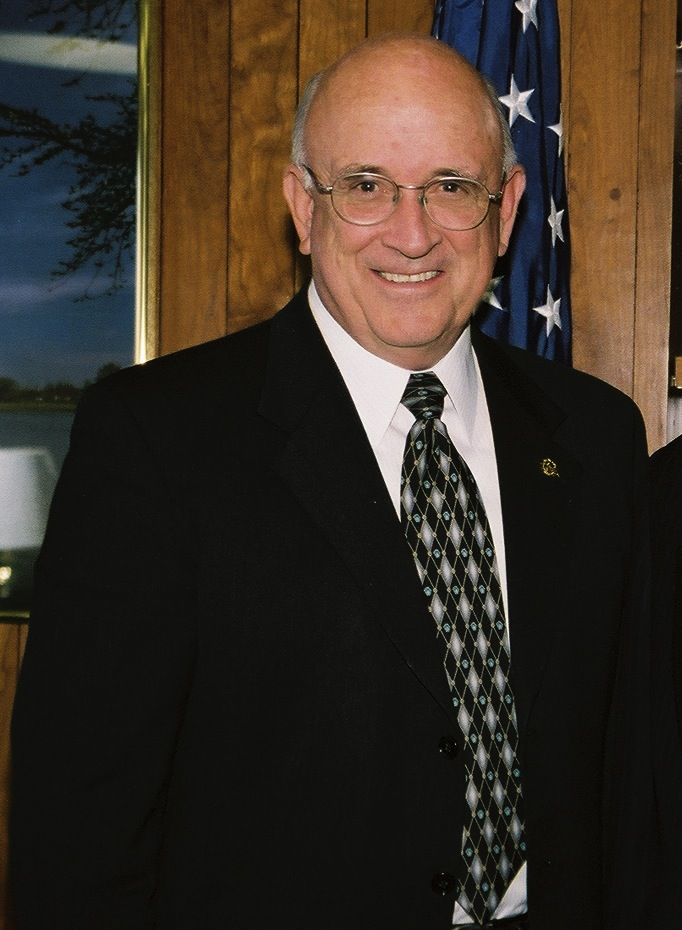

40th Mayor of Tucson
- In office December 6, 1999 – December 5, 2011
- Preceded by: George Miller
- Succeeded by: Jonathan Rothschild

Personal details
- Born: November 14, 1936 Ames, Iowa, U.S.
- Died: March 12, 2021 (aged 84) Tucson, Arizona, U.S.
- Party: Republican
- Spouse: Beth Walkup
- Children: 3
- Education: Iowa State University
- Profession: Industrial engineer

Robert E. Walkup (November 14, 1936 – March 12, 2021) was an American politician who served as the 40th mayor of Tucson from 1999 to 2011. He is the last Republican to be mayor of the city to date.

== Early life and career ==
Walkup was born in Ames, Iowa, on November 14, 1936. His father was a professor of engineering at Iowa State University. He obtained a bachelor's degree in industrial engineering from Iowa State University, before serving in the US Army Corps of Engineers. Upon his return from military service, he worked in the aerospace industry for 35 years. He was employed by Rockwell International, Fairchild Republic, and Hughes Aircraft Company. While working at Rockwell International, Fairchild Republic, he oversaw the production of the Fairchild Republic A-10 Thunderbolt II. He also served as the chairman of the Tucson Economic Council.

== Mayoral career ==
Walkup was first elected on November 2, 1999, defeating Democratic former City Councilwoman Molly McKasson and local businessman Bob Beaudry. Benefitting from a split in the Democratic vote, he was sworn into office on December 6, 1999, succeeding two-term Tucson mayor George Miller, who retired from office as the city's longest-serving official. He became the first Republican mayor of Tucson since 1983.

During his first term as mayor, Walkup intervened after both the University Medical Center and Tucson Medical Center announced the closure of their trauma centers in 2001. He phoned every hospital in the city and hosted a meeting at his office, where plans were formulated for a new world class trauma center, opened on January 8, 2008. He oversaw Tucson's resumption of using Colorado River water in 2001, which was suspended in the 1990s after it corroded residents' pipes. The city corrected this issue by diminishing its salinity and mineral levels. The reintroduction added to the potable supply and decreased reliance on groundwater.

Walkup was re-elected for a second term November 4, 2003, narrowly defeating Democratic former mayor Tom Volgy. During this tenure, he became the first mayor in his state to sign the U.S. Mayors Climate Protection Agreement and presided over the development of Tucson's solar energy capability. Although his proposal of a transportation tax was defeated at the ballot box, this paved the way for a similar tax of half a cent across Pima County that was approved by voters in 2006. He introduced fees for waste collection and for development impact, and shifted the library system to the county. He was partly responsible for amalgamating the economic development agencies into a single regional organization in 2005. He was re-elected for a third term on November 6, 2007, defeating a Green Party candidate with 72% of the vote after the Democrats opted not to field a candidate.

Walkup announced on February 22, 2011 that he would not seek re-election after his current term ended in December. Democrat Jonathan Rothschild won the election and was sworn into office on December 5, 2011.

== Personal life ==
Walkup was married to his second wife, Beth LaRouche for over 30 years until his death. They met while working at the Children’s Museum Tucson, and had five children.

Walkup died on the night of March 12, 2021, at his home in midtown Tucson. He was 84, and had idiopathic pulmonary fibrosis.
