= 1991 Tucson mayoral election =

- November 5, 1991
Nominee	George Miller	George Borozan	Gay Lynn Goetzke
Party	Democratic	Republican	Libertarian
Popular vote	35,962	28,775	8,172
Percentage	47.78%	38.23%	10.86%
Mayor before election
Thomas Volgy
Democratic
Elected mayor
George Miller
Democratic

The 1991 Tucson mayoral election occurred on November 5, 1991, to elect the mayor of Tucson, and occurred coinciding with the elections to the Tucson City Council wards 1, 2 and 4. It saw the election of George Miller.

Incumbent mayor Thomas Volgy did not seek reelection.

== Nominations ==
Primaries were held for the Democratic, Libertarian, and Republican parties on September 17, 1999.

=== Democratic primary ===
Democratic primary results
Party	Candidate	Votes	%
Democratic	George Miller	14,268	50.68
Democratic	Charles "Chuck" Ford	9,635	34.22
Democratic	Thomas "Tom" M. Saggau	2,686	9.54
Democratic	Emily M. Machala	1,221	4.34
Democratic	Gwen J. Portney write-in	7	0.02
Democratic	Other write-in		1.2

=== Libertarian primary ===
Libertarian primary results
Party	Candidate	Votes	%
Libertarian	Gay Lynn Goetzke	107	95.54
Libertarian	Write-in		4.46

=== Republican primary ===
Republican primary results
Party	Candidate	Votes	%
Republican	George Borozan	11,590	74.91
Republican	Write-in		25.09

== General election ==
General election results
Party	Candidate	Votes	%
Democratic	George Miller	35,962	47.78
Republican	George Borozan	28,775	38.23
Libertarian	Gay Lynn Goetzke	8,172	10.86

== See also ==
- List of mayors of Tucson, Arizona
