= 2015 Tucson mayoral election =

- November 3, 2015
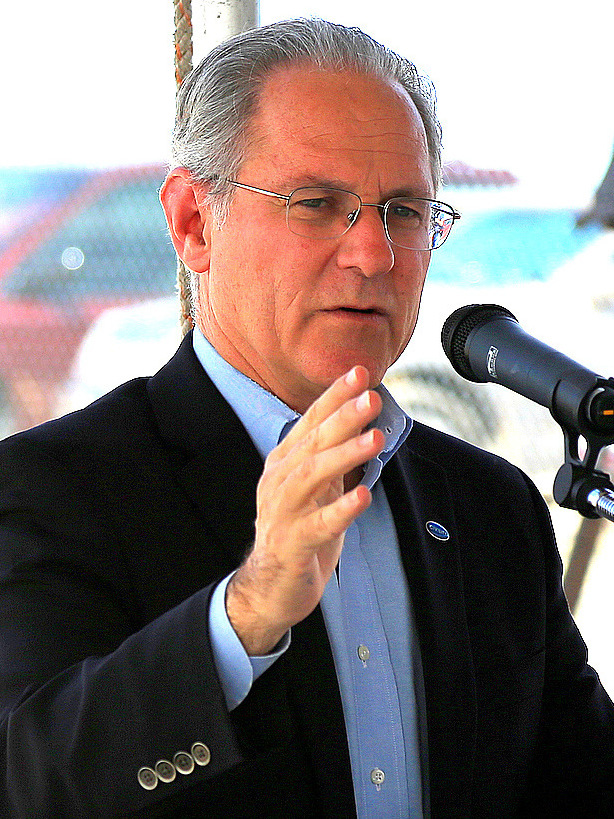
Nominee	Jonathan Rothschild
Party	Democratic
Popular vote	61,358
Percentage	93.41%
Mayor before election
Jonathan Rothschild
Democratic
Elected mayor
Jonathan Rothschild
Democratic

The 2015 Tucson mayoral election was held on November 3, 2015. It saw the reelection of incumbent Jonathan Rothschild.

== Primaries ==
Primaries were held August 25, 2015. One candidate ran in the Democratic primary, while none ran in either the Libertarian or Republican primaries.

=== Democratic primary ===
Democratic primary results
Party	Candidate	Votes	%
Democratic	Jonathan Rothschild (incumbent)	22,438	98.82%
Democratic	Write-in	269	1.19%
Turnout		22,707	

=== Libertarian primary ===
Libertarian primary results
Party	Candidate	Votes	%
Libertarian	Write-in	40	100.00%
Turnout		40	

=== Republican primary ===
Republican primary results
Party	Candidate	Votes	%
Republican	Write-in	1,844	100.00%
Turnout		1,844	

== General election ==
Tucson mayoral election, 2011
Party	Candidate	Votes	%
Democratic	Jonathan Rothschild (incumbent)	61,358	93.41
Write-in	Write-ins	4,327	6.59
Total votes		65,685	

== See also ==
- List of mayors of Tucson, Arizona
