= 1995 Tucson mayoral election =

- November 7, 1995
Nominee	George Miller	Sharon Collins	Ed Kahn
Party	Democratic	Republican	Libertarian
Popular vote	39,141	24,828	6,738
Percentage	53.47%	33.92%	9.21%
Mayor before election
George Miller
Democratic
Elected mayor
George Miller
Democratic

The 1995 Tucson mayoral election occurred on November 7, 1995, to elect the mayor of Tucson, and occurred coinciding with the elections to the Tucson City Council wards 1, 2 and 4. It saw the reelection of incumbent mayor George Miller.

== Nominations ==
Primaries were held for the Democratic, Libertarian, and Republican parties on September 7, 1999.

=== Democratic primary ===
Democratic primary results
Party	Candidate	Votes	%
Democratic	George Miller (incumbent)	15,428	64.33
Democratic	Bruce Wheeler	8,248	34.41
Democratic	Write-in		1.26

=== Libertarian primary ===
Originally also running in the Libertarian primary was Elizabeth Strong-Anderson, who was removed from the ballot by court order.

Libertarian primary results
Party	Candidate	Votes	%
Libertarian	Ed Kahn	508	82.74
Libertarian	Write-in		17.26

=== Republican primary ===
Originally also running in the Libertarian primary was Elizabeth Strong-Anderson, who was removed from the ballot by court order.

Republican primary results
Party	Candidate	Votes	%
Republican	Sharon Collins	7,220	90.98
Republican	Write-in		9.02

== General election ==
General election results
Party	Candidate	Votes	%
Democratic	George Miller (incumbent)	39,141	53.47
Republican	Sharon Collins	24,828	33.92
Libertarian	Ed Kahn	6,738	9.21

== See also ==
- List of mayors of Tucson, Arizona
