= Allen, Arizona =

Ghost town in Pima County, Arizona

Allen, also known as Allen City, is a ghost town in Pima County in southern Arizona. It was founded fifty miles (80 km) southeast of Ajo, c. 1880. By 1886, the post office closed and the town has been abandoned since.

== History ==
Allen was founded by John Brackett Allen, he named his town after himself. The town was near Quijotoa, Allen is on the western side of the Ben Nevis Mountain and Quijotoa is on the east. When American settlers began flocking to Quijotoa, General Brackett was among them who decided he wanted to build a hotel. So, Allen's hotel was built six miles (9.7 km) from Quijotoa and the town of Allen sprang up around it. The hotel, according to sources, served the best liquors in the territory and was also one of the more luxurious hotels on the frontier. The small settlement had the hotel, a half dozen houses, a few tents and a post office established in 1880. Allen no longer had a post office in 1886.

Allen's population was 180 in 1890.

== See also ==
- List of ghost towns in Arizona
