= 1903 Boston mayoral election =

Election in Massachusetts, United States

- December 15, 1903
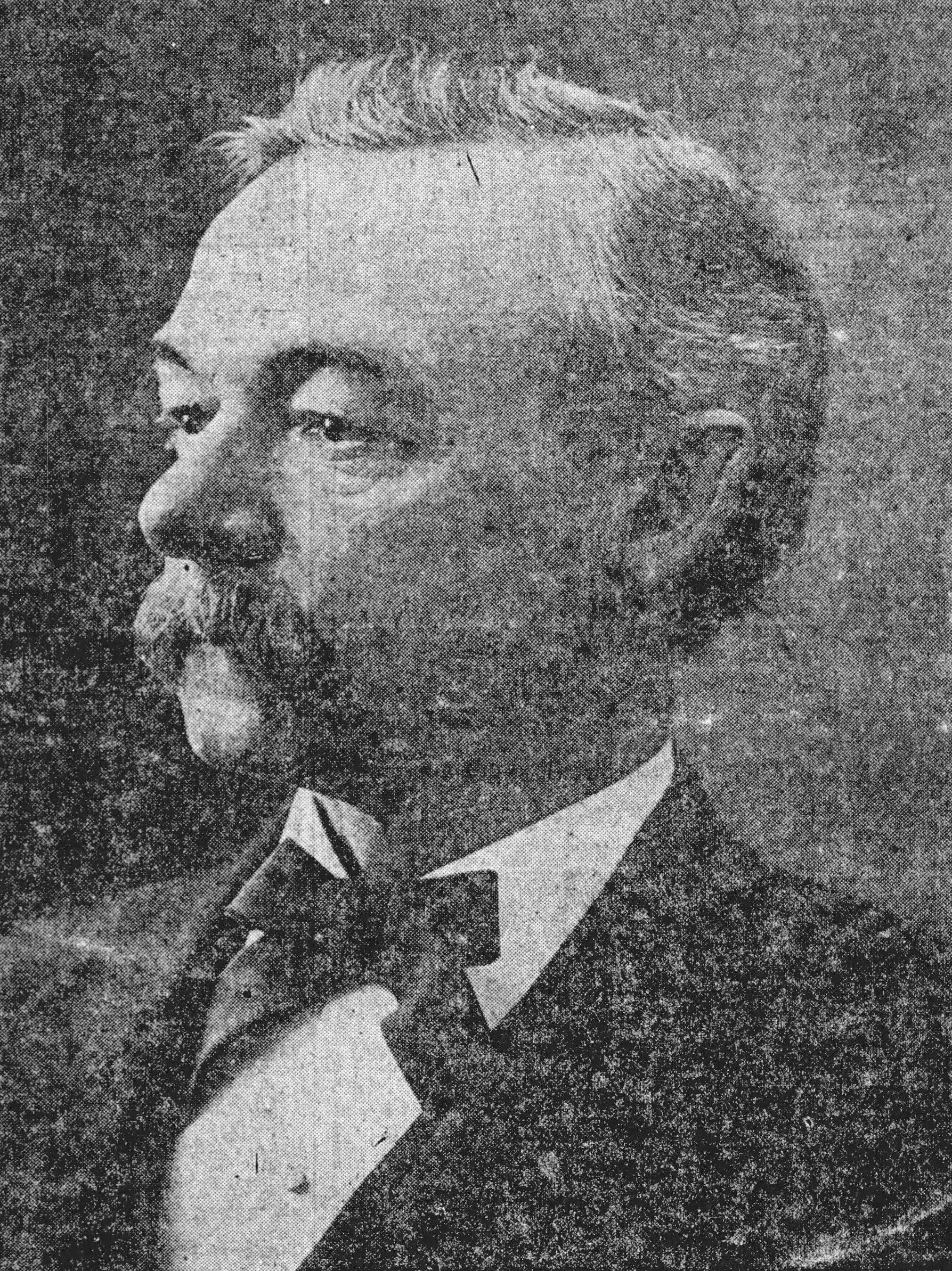

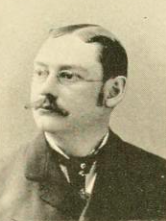

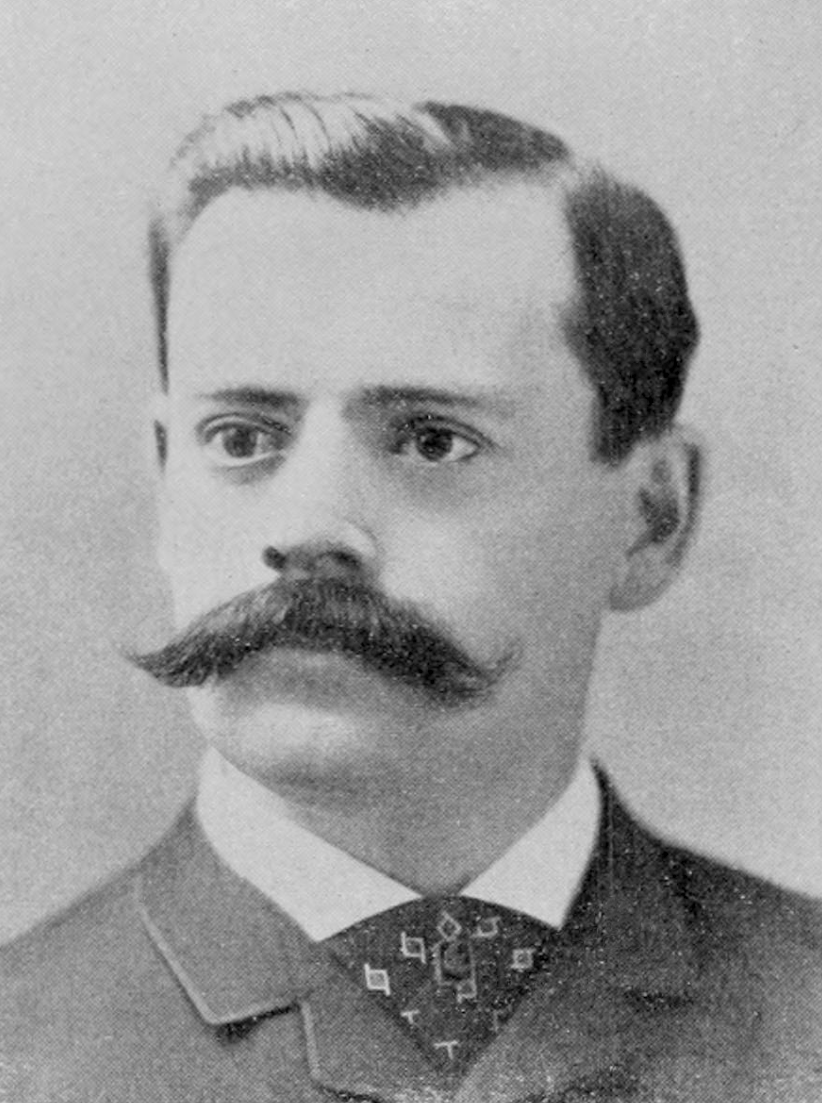
Candidate	Patrick Collins	George N. Swallow	George W. Galvin
Party	Democratic	Republican	Socialist
Popular vote	48,745	22,369	5,205
Percentage	63.0%	28.9%	6.7%
Mayor before election
Patrick Collins
Democratic
Elected mayor
Patrick Collins
Democratic

The Boston mayoral election of 1903 occurred on Tuesday, December 15, 1903. Democratic incumbent Patrick Collins defeated Republican nominee George N. Swallow and two other contenders to win a second term.

Under legislation adopted in June 1903, this was the first Boston municipal election with "caucuses, henceforth to be called primaries", which were held on Thursday, November 19, 1903.

Inaugural exercises were held on Monday, January 4, 1904.

== Results ==
=== Democratic primary ===
- Patrick Collins, Mayor of Boston since 1902, former member of the United States House of Representatives (1883–1889), Massachusetts Senate (1870–1871), and Massachusetts House of Representatives (1868–1869)
- Frederick S. Gore, member of the Massachusetts Senate

Candidates	Primary Election	
Candidates	Votes	%
Patrick Collins (incumbent)	30,729	73.4%
Frederick S. Gore	11,129	26.6%
all others	5	0.0%

=== Republican primary ===
- E. Peabody Gerry, physician, age 56, former Boston Alderman (1900)
- Michael J. Murray, lawyer, age 36
- George N. Swallow, grocer, age 49, former chairman of the Boston Republican Committee (1899), Governor's councilor (1888–1889), state senator (1894), and state representative (1889–1891)

Candidates	Primary Election	
Candidates	Votes	%
George N. Swallow	6,383	52.3%
Michael J. Murray	3,294	27.0%
E. Peabody Gerry	2,530	20.7%

=== Other candidates ===
- William H. Carroll, Socialist Labor
- George W. Galvin, physician and head of the Wage Earners Emergency and General Hospital, Socialist

Galvin received all 423 votes cast in his party's primary election for mayor.

=== General election ===
Candidates		General Election	
Candidates		Votes	%
D	Patrick Collins (incumbent)	48,745	63.0%
R	George N. Swallow	22,369	28.9%
S	George W. Galvin	5,205	6.7%
SLP	William H. Carroll	1,018	1.3%
all others		14	0.0%

== See also ==
- List of mayors of Boston, Massachusetts
