= Louis Murphy (disambiguation) =

Louis Murphy (born 1987) is an American football player.

Louis or Lewis Murphy may also refer to:

- Lew Murphy (Lewis Murphy), Air Force pilot and mayor of Tucson, Arizona
- Lewis Murphy (rugby league), English rugby league player
- Louis Murphy (American politician), American politician, New Jersey senator
- Louis Murphy (Canadian politician), Canadian politician
