= 1999 Tucson mayoral election =

Mayoral Election of Tucson

- November 2, 1999
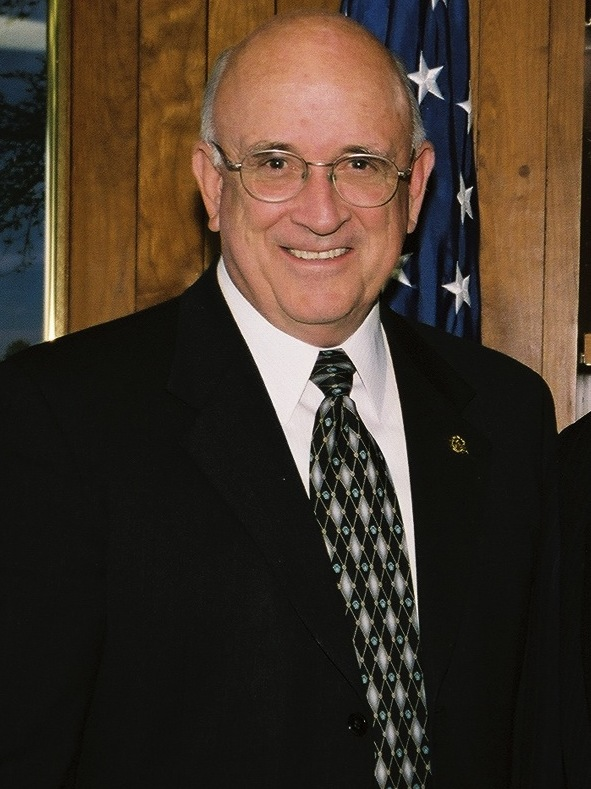

Nominee	Bob Walkup	Molly McKasson	Ed Kahn
Party	Republican	Democratic	Libertarian
Popular vote	46,258	33,999	4,834
Percentage	53.68%	39.45%	5.61%
Mayor before election
George Miller
Democratic
Elected mayor
Bob Walkup
Republican

The 1999 Tucson mayoral election occurred on November 2, 1999, to elect the mayor of Tucson, and occurred coinciding with the elections to the Tucson City Council wards 1, 2 and 4. It saw the election of Bob Walkup.

Incumbent mayor George Miller did not seek reelection to a third term.

== Nominations ==
Primaries were held for the Democratic, Libertarian, and Republican parties on September 7, 1999.

=== Democratic primary ===
Originally also running in the Democratic primary was Emily Machala, who formally withdrew, and Michael Fleishman, who was removed from the ballot by a court ruling.

Democratic primary results
Party	Candidate	Votes	%
Democratic	Molly McKasson	11,864	44.84
Democratic	Betsy Bolding	9,019	34.09
Democratic	Janet Marcus	3,165	11.96
Democratic	Patrick Darcy	2,281	8.62
Democratic	Write-in		0.49

=== Libertarian primary ===
Originally also running in the Libertarian primary was Elizabeth Strong-Anderson, who was removed from the ballot by court order.

Libertarian primary results
Party	Candidate	Votes	%
Libertarian	Ed Kahn	266	89.86
Libertarian	Write-in		10.14

=== Republican primary ===
Republican primary results
Party	Candidate	Votes	%
Republican	Bob Walkup	6,004	93.67
Republican	Write-in		6.33

=== Write-ins ===
- Dave Croteau
- Stephen "The Penneyman" Baker

== General election ==
In the general election, McKasson suffered and Walkup benefited from a fracture in the Democratic Party.

Walkup became the city's first Republican mayor since Lew Murphy left office in 1987.

General election results
Party	Candidate	Votes	%
Republican	Bob Walkup	46,258	53.68
Democratic	Molly McKasson	33,999	39.45
Libertarian	Ed Kahn	4,834	5.61
Write-in	Dave Croteau	79	0.09
Write-in	Stephen "The Penneyman" Baker	5	0.01

== See also ==
- List of mayors of Tucson, Arizona
