= 2007 Tucson mayoral election =

- November 6, 2007
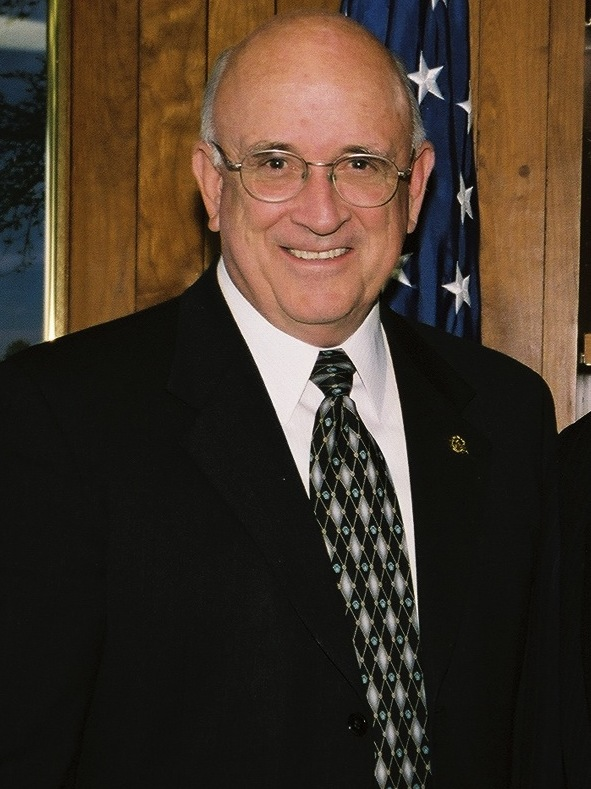

Nominee	Bob Walkup	Dave Croteau
Party	Republican	Green
Popular vote	45,543	17,962
Percentage	71.20%	28.08%
Mayor before election
Bob Walkup
Republican
Elected mayor
Bob Walkup
Republican

The 2007 Tucson mayoral election occurred on November 6, 2007, to elect the mayor of Tucson, Arizona, USA, and coincided with the elections to the Tucson City Council wards 1, 2 and 4. The incumbent Mayor, Bob Walkup, was re-elected.

== Nominations ==
Primaries were held for the Democratic Green, and Republican parties on September 11, 2007.

=== Democratic primary ===
For the Democratic Party, Michael Toney, a write-in candidate won 1,147 votes, or 22.96% of the vote. This was insufficient to capture the nomination. The party did not ultimately have a candidate in the general election.

Democratic primary results
Party	Candidate	Votes	%
Democratic	Michael Toney	1,147	22.96
Democratic	Write-in		77.04

=== Green primary ===
Green primary results
Party	Candidate	Votes	%
Green	David Croteau	308	93.62
Green	Write-in		6.38

=== Republican primary ===
Republican primary results
Party	Candidate	Votes	%
Republican	Bob Walkup (incumbent)	13,440	98.22
Republican	Write-in		1.78

== General election ==
As there was no Democratic nominee, Walkup's main challenger was the Green Party nominee Dave Croteau, who he had also previously faced in the 1999 mayoral election when Croteau ran as a write-in candidate.

General election results
Party	Candidate	Votes	%
Republican	Bob Walkup (incumbent)	45,543	71.20
Green	Dave Croteau	17,962	28.08
Write-in	Guillermo "William E." Ortiz	30	0.04
Write-in	Bruce Gerowitz	25	0.04

== See also ==
- List of mayors of Tucson, Arizona
