= 2003 Tucson mayoral election =

- November 4, 2003
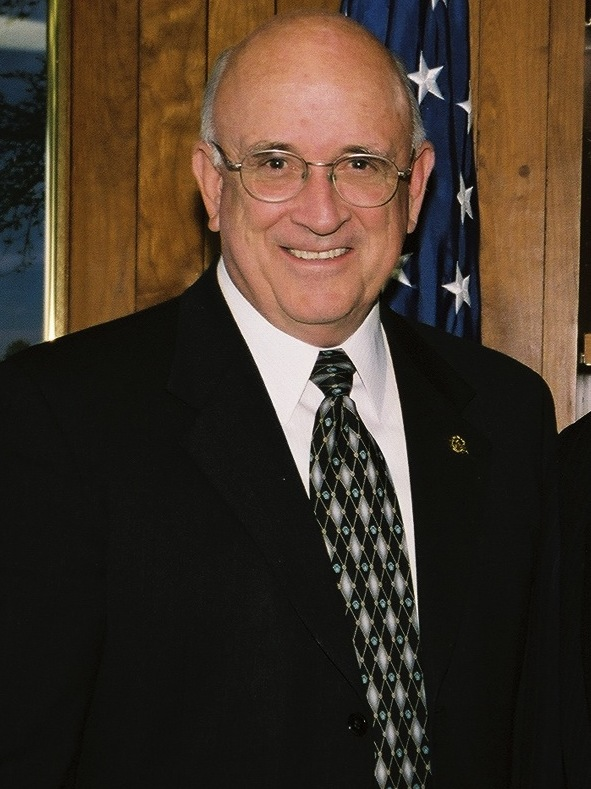

| Nominee | Bob Walkup | Thomas Volgy |
| Party | Republican | Democratic |
| Popular vote | 38,364 | 36,990 |
| Percentage | 49.51% | 47.73% |
Mayor before election
Bob Walkup
Republican
Elected mayor
Bob Walkup
Republican

The 2003 Tucson mayoral election occurred on November 4, 2003, to elect the mayor of Tucson, and occurred coinciding with the elections to the Tucson City Council wards 1, 2 and 4. It saw the reelection of incumbent mayor Bob Walkup.

== Nominations ==
Primaries were held for the Democratic, Libertarian, and Republican parties on September 9, 2003.

=== Democratic primary ===
The Democratic Party saw former mayor Thomas Volgy win 10,365 votes, or 97.67% of the vote. He was originally challenged by Paul Wallace for the nomination, but Wallace formally withdrew his candidacy.

Democratic primary results
| Party | Candidate | Votes | % |
|---|---|---|---|
| Democratic | Thomas Volgy | 10,365 | 97.67 |
| Democratic | Write-in | | 2.33 |

=== Libertarian primary ===
Libertarian primary results
| Party | Candidate | Votes | % |
|---|---|---|---|
| Libertarian | Kimberly Swanson | 79 | 60.31 |
| Libertarian | Other write-in | | 39.69 |

=== Republican primary ===
Republican primary results
| Party | Candidate | Votes | % |
|---|---|---|---|
| Republican | Bob Walkup (incumbent) | 6,105 | 97.70 |
| Republican | Write-in | | 2.3 |

=== Other ===
Patricia Irish unsuccessfully sought to run with no party affiliation, but did not garner enough signatures.

== General election ==
=== Polling ===
| Poll source | Date(s) administered | Sample size (Note: Key: A – all adults RV – registered voters LV – likely voters CV – certain voters V – unclear) | Margin of error | Thomas Volgey (D) | Bob Walkup (R) | Kimberly Swanson (L) | Other / Undecided |
|---|---|---|---|---|---|---|---|
| SurveyUSA | October 31– November 2, 2003 | 423 (CV) | ± 4.9% | 50% | 44% | 4% | 1% |

=== Results ===
General election results
| Party | Candidate | Votes | % |
|---|---|---|---|
| Republican | Bob Walkup (incumbent) | 38,364 | 49.51 |
| Democratic | Thomas Volgy | 36,990 | 47.73 |
| Libertarian | Kimberly Swanson write-in | 2,071 | 2.67 |
| Write-in | Jesus Christ | 2 | 0.00 |
| Write-in | Stephen "The Penneyman" Baker | 0 | 0.00 |

== See also ==
- List of mayors of Tucson, Arizona
