= 2011 Tucson mayoral election =

- November 8, 2011
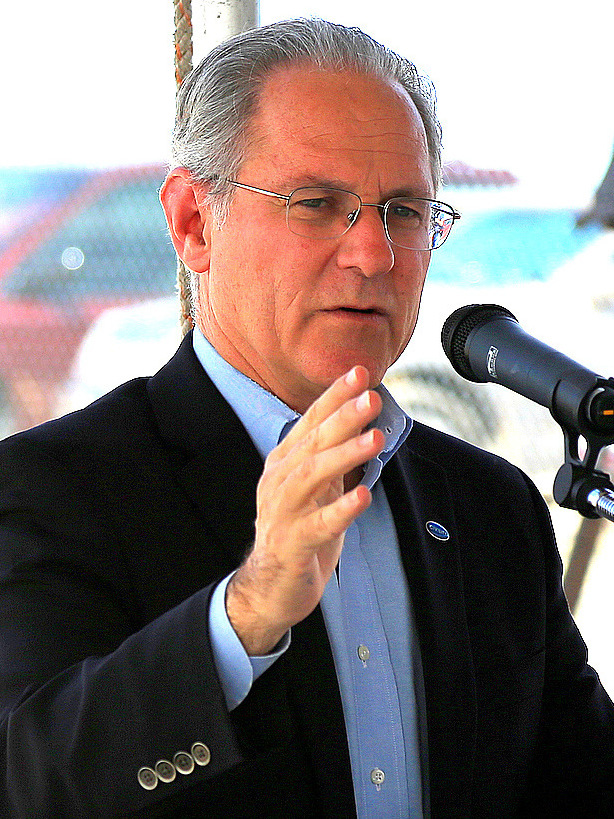

| Nominee | Jonathan Rothschild | Rick Grinnell |
| Party | Democratic | Republican |
| Popular vote | 46,733 | 33,932 |
| Percentage | 54.96% | 39.91% |
Mayor before election
Bob Walkup
Republican
Elected mayor
Jonathan Rothschild
Democratic

The 2011 Tucson mayoral election occurred on November 8, 2011, to select the next mayor of Tucson, and occurred simultaneously with the elections to the Tucson City Council wards 1, 2 and 4. Although not term-limited, incumbent mayor Bob Walkup did not run for re-election, leaving Tucson's chief executive office open and competitive, with seven candidates filing to run in the race.

== Background ==
Because elections in Tucson are partisan, party primaries were held on August 30, 2011.

Current Republican Mayor Bob Walkup did not run for re-election to a third term. Traditionally, Tucson is a Democratic stronghold with its position as a university town and its large Hispanic American population (41.6% of the city's population according to the 2010 Census). Thus, a change of party control of the mayoralty was seen as a strong possibility.

For the first time in Tucson, all of the elections (mayor and city council) were conducted via mail, due to a decision by the city council in April.

== Nominations ==
Primaries for the Democratic. Green, Libertarian, and Republican parties were held August 30, 2011.

=== Democratic primary ===
Originally political newcomer Marshall Home had registered to challenge incumbent Jonathan Rothschild.

Democratic primary results
| Party | Candidate | Votes | % |
|---|---|---|---|
| Democratic | Jonathan Rothschild | 26,911 | 96.94 |
| Democratic | Write-in | 848 | 3.06 |
| Turnout | | 27,766 | |

=== Green primary ===
Green primary results
| Party | Candidate | Votes | % |
|---|---|---|---|
| Green | Mary DeCamp | 369 | 70.69 |
| Green | Dave Croteau | 127 | 24.33 |
| Green | Write-ins | 26 | 4.98 |
| Turnout | | 522 | |

=== Libertarian primary ===
Libertarian primary results
| Party | Candidate | Votes | % |
|---|---|---|---|
| Libertarian | Write-in | 83 | 100.00 |
| Turnout | | 83 | |

=== Republican primary ===
Republicans nominated Rick Grinnell

Republican primary results
| Party | Candidate | Votes | % |
|---|---|---|---|
| Republican | Write-in | 9,687 | 100.00 |
| Turnout | | 9,687 | |

=== Independent candidates ===
Originally, Pat Darcy had registered to run as an independent.

==== Write-in candidates ====
- Joseph Maher Jr.

== General election ==
Tucson mayoral election, 2011
| Party | Candidate | Votes | % |
|---|---|---|---|
| Democratic | Jonathan Rothschild | 46,733 | 54.96 |
| Republican | Rick Grinnell | 33,932 | 39.91 |
| Green | Mary DeCamp | 4,198 | 4.94 |
| Write-in | Write-ins | 164 | 0.19 |
| Total votes | | 85,027 | 100.00 |

== See also ==
- List of mayors of Tucson, Arizona
