= Johnston Knox Corbett =

American politician (1861–1934)

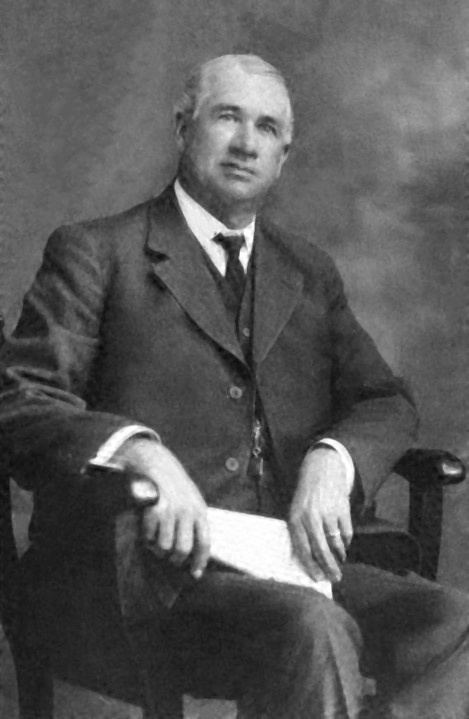

Mayor of Tucson, Arizona
- In office January 4, 1915 – January 2, 1917
- Preceded by: Ira Erven Huffman
- Succeeded by: Olva Clayton Parker

Personal details
- Born: June 20, 1861 Sumter, South Carolina
- Died: April 22, 1934 (aged 72) Tucson, Arizona
- Resting place: Evergreen Cemetery; Tucson, Arizona
- Party: Republican
- Spouses: Elizabeth "Lizzie" née Hughes; ( - April 22, 1934 his death)

Johnston Knox Corbett (June 20, 1861 – April 22, 1934) was elected to two one year terms as mayor of Tucson, Arizona. He served from January 1915 to January 1917.

== Biography ==
J. Knox Corbett was born June 20, 1861, at Sumter, South Carolina. His paternal grandfather was a native of Scotland, but his maternal ancestors had been in America for several generations, and some of them fought for independence in the Revolution. Corbett started in the lumber business as a boy when employed in his home town for four years. He first came to Arizona in January 1880 when he made the journey from Albuquerque, New Mexico to Tucson by stagecoach.

His first position in Tucson was as postal clerk, which he retained for three years. Then he ran a stagecoach between Tucson and Silverbell for about a year, then he served as assistant postmaster for four years.

In the meantime he had become interested in the cattle business, established a ranch in the Rincon Mountains, and at the expiration of his term in the post office located on his property, still retaining his home in Tucson. In 1898 he disposed of all his cattle interests and made his permanent home in Tucson, and in 1890 was appointed postmaster there. Upon retiring from office in 1894, he engaged in the lumber business which constantly increased in its scope until he was proprietor of the largest business in that line in Southern Arizona. Corbett was known throughout the state as a representative business man and Republican. He was a prominent member of the Elks. In 1885 he married Miss Lizzie Hughes, one of Tucson's native daughters, whose father Samuel C. Hughes, was one of Tucson's most prominent pioneers.

In December 1914 Corbett defeated incumbent Ira Huffman by close to 300 votes in an "extremely heavy vote" to become mayor of Tucson, Arizona.

His great-nephew Jim Corbett was mayor from 1967 to 1971.
