= Estevan Ochoa =

Mexican-born American businessman and politician (1831–1888)

Mayor of Tucson, Arizona
- In office 1875–1876
- Preceded by: James H. Toole
- Succeeded by: John Brackett "Pie" Allen

Personal details
- Born: March 17, 1831 Chihuahua, Mexico
- Died: October 27, 1888 (aged 57) Las Cruces, New Mexico
- Resting place: Holy Hope Cemetery, Tucson, Arizona
- Spouse: Altagracia Salazar Ochoa

Estevan Ochoa (March 17, 1831 – October 27, 1888) was a Mexican-born American businessman and politician who participated in the creation of the Arizona Territory.

== Biography ==
Ochoa was born to Jesus Ochoa in Chihuahua, Mexico on March 17, 1831. His family had a variety of business interests and appear on the registry of navigation from when Cortés sailed from Spain. While he was growing up, his family operated a freight-hauling business along the Santa Fe Trail. Ochoa accompanied his family's wagon trains from Chihuahua to points as distant as Independence, Missouri. His experiences on the trail taught him the skills of a merchant while time spent in Kansas provided him with fluency in the English language.

Following the Mexican–American War, Ochoa decided to settle in the United States. His first store was located in Mesilla, New Mexico Territory. From there he expanded to a second store in Las Cruces Shortly thereafter he partnered with Pinckney R. Tully, who had moved to Mesilla in 1854, to form the freighting and mercantile firm of Tully & Ochoa. In 1856, Ochoa was a delegate to a convention seeking creation of Arizona from a section of New Mexico Territory.

One of Tully & Ochoa's early business ventures sent a large supply train to Tucson, New Mexico Territory. After all the supply train's goods sold out in just a few hours the firm decided to open stores in both Tucson and Tubac. Ochoa soon followed, moving to Tucson in 1860. By the time the American Civil War broke out, Ochoa was loyal to both his adopted homeland and the Union cause. When a Confederate column reached Tucson, the commanding leader sent for Ochoa and demanded he swear a loyalty oath to the Confederacy. The merchant immediately refused, informing the officer that he "owed all he had in the world to the Government of the United States, and it would be impossible for him to take an oath of fidelity to any hostile power or party." He told the officer he was willing to leave town instead of signing the oath. The officer then allowed Ochoa to select a horse and quickly pack a pair of saddlebags before providing him a rifle with 20 rounds of ammunition and having him escorted out of town. The merchant then surprisingly survived a journey of 250 miles (400 km) through Apache territory to Union forces stationed on the Rio Grande.

Ochoa returned to Tucson after the Union regained control of the town. His return to prosperity soon followed. In addition to their mercantile operations, Tully & Ochoa landed a number of lucrative government contracts supplying Indian reservations and military outposts. The freight hauling operations in turn, with their associated system of relay stations, gained widespread recognition as it brought goods to Arizona and New Mexico from as far away as Kansas City, Missouri. The firm's armed convoys, which frequently had to fight off Apache attacks, became a primary link during the 1860s and 1870s between Tucson and the outside world. Ochoa had instructed his wagon masters to give limited amounts of supplies to hostile Indians in an effort to placate them. This limited losses and gained the firm a reputation for getting through even though they still experienced heavy losses. The firm also operated a stagecoach line connecting Tucson to Yuma and Santa Fe, New Mexico Territory. Ochoa's other business interests included mining operations and an 1870s experiment with manufacturing woolen goods in Tucson.

At the age of 46, Ochoa married Altagracia Salazar in an elaborate ceremony befitting his wealth and position in the community. The union produced a son, Estevan II, and an adopted daughter, Juana.

As one of Tucson's leading citizens, Ochoa and his wife, maintained a magnificent home that boasted a peacock among its amenities. Together with his friend, Governor Anson P. K. Safford, the merchant was a champion of public education. Ochoa represented Pima County in the council of both the 5th and 6th Arizona Territorial Legislature. During the second of these sessions he introduced legislation that created Arizona's first public school system. Ochoa then donated the land for Tucson's first public school building and even paid to complete construction when tax revenues proved insufficient for the task.

In 1875, Ochoa was elected Mayor of Tucson by a margin of 187–40. He also served as President of Tucson's school board. His final service in public office came with his election to the 9th Arizona Territorial Legislature as a member of the House of Representatives. With the arrival of the railroads in 1880, Ochoa's business fell on hard times. The shipping firms large investment in wagons and livestock became virtually worthless. With the resulting loss of over US$200,000 ($7 million current value), the firm of Tully & Ochoa collapsed.

Ochoa died in Las Cruces on October 27, 1888. Initially buried there, his remains were moved by his family to Tucson in 1940 to be interred beside his wife. Ochoa Street in downtown Tucson is named after him. Tucson's Ochoa Elementary School is likewise named in his honor.
