= George N. Swallow =

American politician

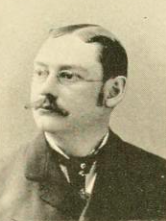

Member of the Massachusetts Governor's Council for the 3rd District
- In office 1898–1899
- Preceded by: Everett C. Benton
- Succeeded by: Oliver H. Durrell

Member of the Massachusetts Senate for the 2nd Suffolk district
- In office 1894–1894
- Preceded by: John Henry Dee
- Succeeded by: Joseph J. Corbett

Member of the Massachusetts House of Representatives for the 5th Suffolk district
- In office 1889–1891
- Preceded by: Patrick J. Calnan / Edward Gagan
- Succeeded by: Charles M. Dacey

Personal details
- Born: January 2, 1854 Charlestown
- Died: November 23, 1931 (aged 77) West Roxbury
- Resting place: Mount Hope Cemetery
- Party: Republican

George Newton Swallow (January 2, 1854 – November 23, 1931) was an American politician who served in the Massachusetts General Court and on the Massachusetts Governor's Council. He was the Republican nominee for Mayor of Boston in the 1903 Boston mayoral election

== Early life ==
Swallow was born in Charlestown on January 2, 1854. He entered the grocery business in 1872 and was the head of the A. N. Swallow & Co., a wholesale grocery firm. He resided in Charlestown until 1901 when he purchased 137 Bay State Road in Boston's Back Bay neighborhood.

== Political career ==
Swallow represented Boston's Ward 5 in the Massachusetts House of Representatives in 1889, 1890, and 1891. He was a member of the Republican state committee in 1892 and 1893. In 1894 he represented the 2nd Suffolk district in the Massachusetts Senate. In 1894, Swallow was an unsuccessful candidate for the Republican nomination for the 3rd district seat on the Massachusetts Governor's Council. He was elected to the council in 1897 and served from 1898 to 1899.

In 1899, Swallow was chairman of the Boston Republican committee. That year, the Republicans were successful in electing Thomas N. Hart Mayor. Swallow campaigned vigorously for Hart and was alleged to have spent $13,000 of his own money on the campaign. By 1901, Hart and Swallow had fallen out and some younger members of the Republican party who were dissatisfied with Hart's administration proposed Swallow as a candidate for the Republican nomination. After six months of consideration, Swallow announced he would not challenge Hart in the 1901 Boston mayoral election.

Swallow was a candidate for mayor in the 1903 Boston mayoral election. He easily defeated Michael J. Murray and E. Peabody Gerry for the Republican nomination. Swallow lost the general election to Democratic incumbent Patrick Collins 63% to 29%.

== Later life ==
On January 27, 1904, Swallow's wife died at the home of a relative in Hopkinton, Massachusetts. The cause of death was found to be suicide by morphine overdose. The Swallows had been separated for about a year prior to her death. Swallow later remarried and moved to West Roxbury. He died on November 23, 1931, and was buried at Mount Hope Cemetery. He was survived by his wife and three sons.
