= Pie Allen =

American prospector, businessman, and politician (1818–1899)

John Brackett "Pie" Allen

Mayor of Tucson, Arizona
- In office 1875–1877
- Preceded by: Estevan Ochoa
- Succeeded by: James H. Toole

Personal details
- Born: October 22, 1818 Maine, US
- Died: June 13, 1899 (aged 80) Tucson, Arizona, US

John Brackett "Pie" Allen (October 22, 1818 – June 13, 1899) was an American prospector, businessman, and politician. Unsuccessful in his efforts as a prospector, he earned his nickname baking pies for settlers and soldiers in Arizona Territory. His business success made him a prominent territorial citizen and he served three terms in the Arizona Territorial Legislature, two terms as Mayor of Tucson, Arizona Territory, and was appointed Arizona Territorial Treasurer for six years.

== Biography ==
Allen was born in Maine on October 22, 1818, and educated in Boston, Massachusetts. He moved to the American West as part of the California Gold Rush, arriving in Colorado City, Arizona Territory (now Yuma) in 1857. From there he moved to Gila City to work in the placer fields before arriving in Tucson in 1858.

Upon his arrival in Tucson, Allen gave up his ambition of striking it rich by finding gold. Instead, he began baking pies with dried apples and selling them to the local townsfolk and soldiers for a dollar a pie. His pies proved to be quite popular and profits from the endeavor allowed him to open a general store. His skill as a baker also earned him the nickname "Pie".

Following his initial success, Allen opened stores in Tubac and Maricopa Wells. Additionally, he branched out into farming and ranching activities. On July 27, 1864, he became the first person in Arizona Territory to file a homestead application and is credited with constructing the first buildings in Tucson's new "American" section. Later activities include operating one of Arizona's first dairy farms and he is thought to have been the first to introduce honey bees to the territory. During the reign of Maximilian I in Mexico, Allen supplied arms to the anti-royalist forces.

In addition to his business interests, Allen also became involved in territorial politics. As a member of the 4th Arizona Territorial Legislature, he led the effort to move the territorial capital from Prescott to Tucson. On November 18, 1867 Allen was appointed one of three superintendents to Arizona's first school district. Governor Richard C. McCormick then appointed him Territorial Treasurer on December 31, 1867. Under his management the territorial deficit was quickly erased. In 1873, Allen resigned as Treasurer after being elected a member of the 7th Arizona Territorial Legislature. He was reappointed at the close of the session and continued to serve until 1875. Following his time as Treasurer he was appointed Adjunct General for the territory and became known as "General Pie". Allen ascended Tucson's mayoral office on April 15, 1876, serving a partial term. In January 1877 he won election to a full term as mayor. While in office, he used broom wielding prison inmates to implement the city's first street sweeping program.

With the founding of Tombstone, Allen opened another store out of the town's first major building. During much of his life Allen was something of a wanderer, moving from place to place throughout southern Arizona. In addition to Tubac, Tucson, Tombstone, and Maricopa Wells he operated businesses in Casa Grande, Quijotoa, Mammoth, Gunsight, and Willcox. In 1891, when he was elected to represent Pinal County in the 16th Arizona Territorial Legislature, he was living in Florence.

In 1881 the 63-year-old Allen proposed marriage to a teenaged girl named Lola Tapia. The girl's mother agreed to the union on the condition she stayed in a convent. The marriage took place and Lola remained at the convent till the next year when she gave birth to a daughter. The marriage lasted until 1891 when Allen was granted a divorce on grounds of his wife's infidelity.

In April 1899, Allen was suffering through the final stages of terminal cancer when his friends in Tucson decided to hold a dinner in his honor. During the ceremony he was presented with a tombstone by Zeckendorf & Company. In addition to his name and dates of birth and death the tombstone bore the epitaph "Territorial Treasurer Six Years, 1865 to 1871. Mayor of Tucson two terms. A man without an enemy."

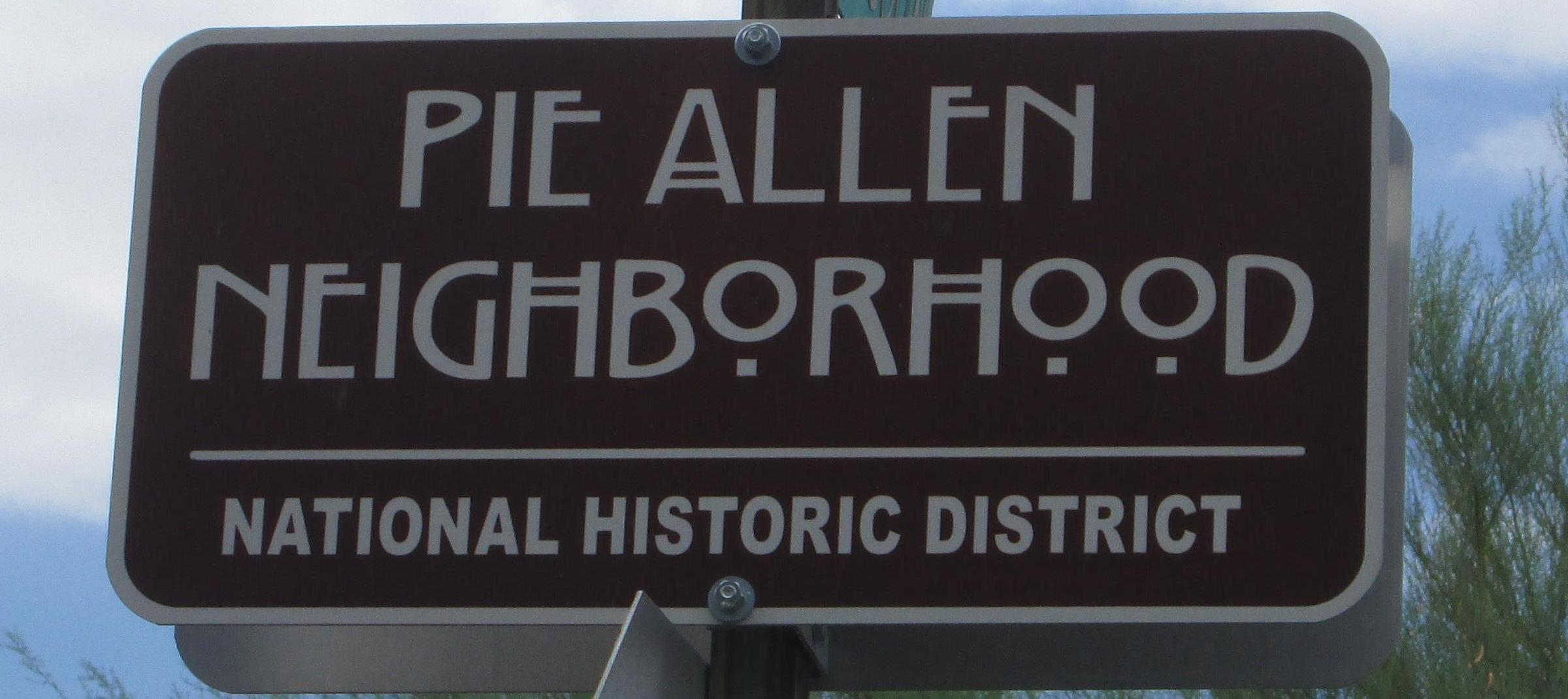

Allen died in Tucson on June 13, 1899. He was buried in the paupers' section of Tucson's Court Street cemetery. His tombstone was later moved to Pima County Cemetery without his remains to clear land for a building project. Records to determine the location and disposition of his remains have been subsequently lost. The Pie Allen Historic District in Tucson was named a National Register Historic District in 1996.
