= Samuel C. Hughes =

American businessman and politician (1829–1917)

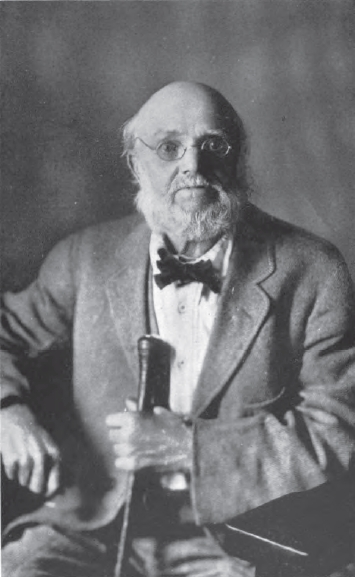
Samuel C. Hughes

Samuel C. Hughes (August 28, 1829 – June 20, 1917) was a Welsh-born American businessman and politician. He was one of the first people to move to Arizona for health reasons. After his arrival, he became one of Tucson's leading citizens and the brother-in-law and business partner to Arizona Territorial delegate Hiram S. Stevens.

== Background ==
Hughes was born in Pembrokeshire, Wales on August 28, 1829. His siblings included Arizona Governor L. C. Hughes. His family immigrated to the United States in 1837, settling near Allegheny City, Pennsylvania. The death of his parents forced him to enter the workforce at a young age. While Hughes' formal education consisted of three days of school room instruction, he learned a variety of skills while working. His early employment included positions as a factory worker, canal boat pilot, and apprentice baker before becoming a cabin boy on a steamboat in 1848. Two years later, working as a cook to pay his way, Hughes traveled from St. Joseph, Missouri, to Hangtown, California.

In California, Hughes worked as a stagecoach stop operator, hotel keeper, restaurant owner, and miner. He was in Yreka, California, in 1851, moving to Jacksonville, Oregon, the next year. He began working near the Siskiyou Mountains in 1853. Three years later, Hughes was in the Shasta Valley learning about cattle ranching.

A diagnosis of tuberculosis forced Hughes to leave California. Seeking a warmer climate, he set out for Texas. The advanced stage of his medical problems forced him to stop in both Yuma and Maricopa Wells, New Mexico Territory for several days rest before reaching Tucson on March 12, 1858. Hughes found the town to his liking and ended up making it his home.

It took several months for Hughes to recover his health. Once he did, he opened a butcher shop. His business became quite successful as he began selling meat and grain to the military and the Overland Stage Company. When the American Civil War reached Tucson, the Confederacy gave Hughes and other supporters of the Union cause the option to leave or be shot. Hughes left for California, returning to Tucson with the California Column.

Upon his return, Hughes returned to his role operating a butcher store and serving as a government contractor. In 1865, he partnered with Hiram S. Stevens to jointly stock a store. The two men continued their partnership, forming Hughes, Stevens and Company in 1876. Firm had cattle ranching, mercantile, and mining interests. The long-term business partners would also become brothers-in-law when they ended up marrying sisters. Hughes' marriage came on May 27, 1862, when he wed 12-year-old Atanacia Santa Cruz. The couple had 10 children. Hughes became one of Tucson's richest residents and was an organizer for Tucson's first bank.

Politically, Hughes was elected to the 2nd Arizona Territorial Legislature but declined to attend. He was a member of the Tucson city council for seven years and refused to accept the position of mayor. He served as Pima County sheriff and county treasurer. In 1871, Hughes was appointed Arizona Territory's adjutant-general by Governor Anson P.K. Safford. That same year he was allegedly involved with the Camp Grant Massacre, supposedly providing supplies to the assailants but not participating in the attack itself.

Called "Uncle Sam" by the citizens of Tucson, Hughes became known for his philanthropic activities. He donated land and money for the construction of both churches and schools as well as donating to the poor and grubstaking prospectors. Hughes was a 32nd degree mason and one of the organizing members of the Arizona Pioneers Historical Society. Hughes died on June 20, 1917, in Tucson. He was buried in Evergreen Cemetery.
