= 2005 Rochester mayoral election =

- November 8, 2005
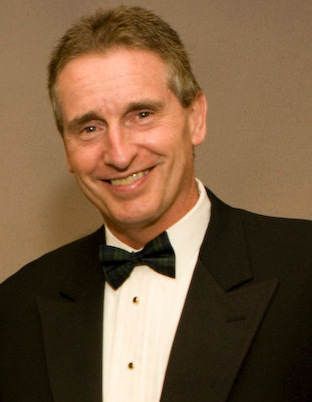
		GOP	WFP
Nominee	Robert Duffy	John Parinello	Tim Mains
Party	Democratic	Republican	Working Families
Popular vote	27,396	6,314	3,903
Percentage	72.00%	16.59%	10.26%
Mayor before election
William A. Johnson Jr.
Democratic
Elected mayor
Robert Duffy
Democratic

The 2005 Rochester mayoral election took place on November 8, 2005, in the city of Rochester, New York, United States. Robert Duffy was elected to succeed outgoing mayor William A. Johnson Jr. who chose not to seek a fourth term.

== Candidates ==
=== Democratic ===
- Robert Duffy - Chief of the Rochester Police Department
- Wade Norwood - City councilman
- Tim Mains - City councilman
- Chris Maj - Business owner

Norwood had been selected by the party convention in April and was backed by local party elites such as Joe Morelle and David Gantt. However, he was defeated by Duffy in the primary election.

The primary election was held on September 13, 2005.

Democratic primary results
Party	Candidate	Votes	%
Democratic	Robert Duffy	10,616	49.58%
Democratic	Wade Norwood	8,397	39.22%
Democratic	Tim Mains	2,186	10.21%
Democratic	Chris Maj	211	0.99%
Total votes		21,410	100%

=== Republican ===
- John Parrinello - criminal defense attorney

== General Election ==
General election results
Party	Candidate	Votes	%
Democratic	Robert Duffy	24,776	65.11%
Independence	Robert Duffy	2,620	6.89%
Total	Robert Duffy	27,396	72.00%
Republican	John Parrinello	6,314	16.59%
Working Families	Tim Mains	3,903	10.26%
Red White and Blue	Chris Maj	439	1.15%
Total votes		38,052	100%
