= 2017 Stamford mayoral election =

- November 7, 2017
- Turnout: 28%
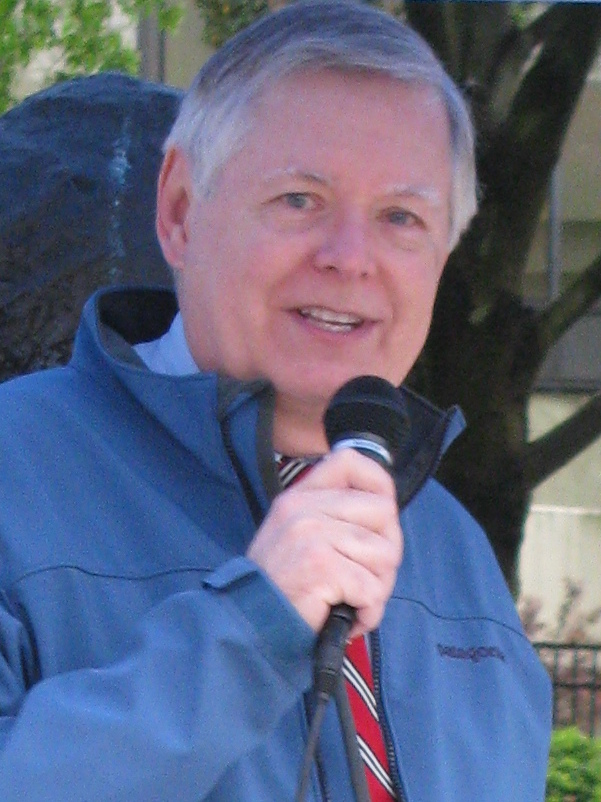

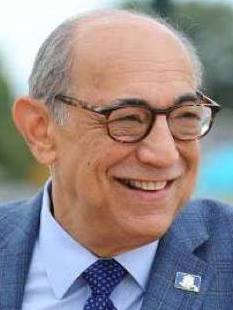

Candidate	David Martin	Barry Michelson	John J. Zito, Jr.
Party	Democratic	Republican	Independent
Popular vote	10,974	6,490	1,260
Percentage	58.61%	34.66%	6.73%
- Results by district Martin: 40–50% 50–60% 60–70% 70–80% 80–90% Michelson 40–50%
Mayor before election
David Martin
Democratic
Elected mayor
David Martin
Democratic

The 2017 Stamford mayoral election was held on November 7, 2017. The election saw the reelection of David Martin.

== General election ==
General election results
Party	Candidate	Votes	%
Democratic	David Martin (incumbent)	10,974	58.61%
Republican	Barry Michelson	6,490	34.66%
Independent	John J. Zito, Jr.	1,260	6.73%
