= Preston Jacobus =

American businessman and politician (1864–1911)

Preston N. Jacobus
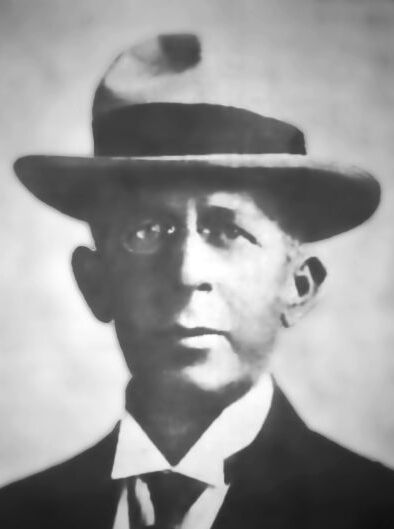

Mayor of Tucson, Arizona
- In office 1910–1911
- Preceded by: Ben Heney
- Succeeded by: Ira Erven Huffman

Personal details
- Born: Preston N. Jacobus; February 25, 1864 Sussex County, New Jersey, U.S
- Died: November 28, 1911 (aged 47)
- Cause of death: pulmonary tuberculosis
- Party: Republican
- Spouse: Anna C. Hedges

Preston N. Jacobus (February 25, 1864 – November 28, 1911) was an American real estate developer, businessman, and politician. He served one term as Mayor of Tucson, Arizona Territory. Jacobus was a member of the Republican Party.

Jacobus Avenue in Tucson, Arizona is named after Jacobus.

== Biography ==
Jacobus was born on February 25, 1864 in Sussex County, New Jersey as the second child of Peter N. Jacobus, a doctor from New Jersey, and Otilia “Delius” Jacobus of Prussia. He married Anna C. Hedges in 1892 and had 2 children. Jacobus was diagnosed with tuberculosis in 1901. They lived in Yonkers, New York. Jacobus died on November 28, 1911 from tuberculosis.
