= Development impact tax =

A development impact tax is a fee imposed on new construction. Such taxes are commonly used to pay for the infrastructure needed to support the public strain of new development. New commercial development can require additional infrastructure or other public services that require tax money; however, impact taxes usually apply to residential development.

Whenever many houses are built and many people move into an area tax money is spent. In order to support the increased population new schools need to be built as well as libraries, hospitals, water treatment, etc.

== Politics ==
Many areas of the United States are involved in heated debate over development. People who support development often cite the benefits of increased economic activity, and the housing needs of an increasing population. Opposers of development point at crowded roads and schools, environmental impact, and depleting farmland. Development is also criticized for more difficult storm water management due to a higher percentage of the ground being paved.

=== Virginia ===
It is currently illegal to charge impact taxes in certain areas of Virginia. The state government passed a law to limit the option for localities to charge impact taxes. The population of the county determines whether or not they are permitted to charge the taxes. To check out Virginia's policy on income taxes go to the Code of Virginia at Virginia's Legislative Information System (LIS).
