= Pinckney R. Tully =

American businessman and politician (1824–1903)

Mayor of Tucson, Arizona
- In office January 10, 1882 – January 9, 1883
- Preceded by: J. S. Carr
- Succeeded by: Charles M. Strauss

Personal details
- Born: March 25, 1824 Port Gibson, Mississippi
- Died: November 10, 1903 (aged 79) Healdsburg, California
- Spouse(s): Maria Trinidad Conklin (m. 1848–1874) Delores Juarez (m. 1881–1903)

Pinckney Randolph Tully (March 23, 1824 – November 10, 1903) was an American businessman and politician who served as Arizona Territorial Treasurer and Mayor of Tucson, Arizona Territory.

== Background ==
Tully was born on March 25, 1824, in Port Gibson, Mississippi. Details regarding his education have been lost. While he was growing up, his family moved to Arkansas. In 1845, his family began a move to Oregon but abandoned their efforts in western Missouri following the death of Tully's father. Tully, who was a young adult at the time, continued down the Santa Fe Trail to Santa Fe, New Mexico.

In Santa Fe, Tully worked at a mercantile firm. At the same time he developed a business interest with James Conklin. In 1849, he drove a heard of sheep to California, returning the next year in a group led by François Xavier Aubry. This trip was quite profitable as the animals sold for five to ten times their price in Santa Fe.

Upon returning to New Mexico, Tully married one of Conklin's daughters, María Trinidad. He also oversaw construction of a house that is now on the National Register of Historic Places as the Pinckney R. Tully House. Shortly thereafter his business interests expanded to include a trading post at Fort Thorn, New Mexico.

Tully moved to Mesilla in 1854. Shortly thereafter he partnered with Estevan Ochoa. IN 1858, the firm of Tully & Ochoa brought a wagon train of supplies to Tucson. The entire inventory was purchased by Solomon Warner within hours of the caravan's arrival. This prompted the partners to open a store in Tucson. Tully & Ochoa followed with a second store in Tubac in 1864.

In 1865, following the death of his friend and fellow Mason, Charles Hopkins, Tully adopted Hopkins' 11-year-old son, Carlos. Three years later he moved to Tucson. While Tully was a Democrat, his willingness to work with the Republican-dominated "Federal Ring", which dominated the territorial government of the day, allowed the firm of Tully & Ochoa to obtain a variety of government contracts. As a result, the firm of Tully & Ochoa prospered for a time. Civic-ally, Tully signed an April 20, 1871, petition calling for Tucson's incorporation. He was also a supporter of public education and the Catholic church.

Tully's first wife, María Trinidad, died in September 1874 after a cigarette she was smoking caused her dress to catch fire. He married Delores Jaurez on October 29, 1881. Tully's second marriage produced five children.

Politically, Tully was selected to become a member of the Pima County Board of Supervisors in October 1871. On July 9, 1873, Tully was appointed Territorial Treasurer by Governor Anson P. K. Safford. The same year he was appointed to the territorial board of penitentiary directors. Tully was reappointed Territorial Treasurer on February 12, 1875, and February 9, 1877, but resigned shortly after his second reappointment when the 9th Arizona Territorial Legislature moved the territorial capital back to Prescott.

At the city level, Tully became a member of Tucson's board of health in 1876. He served as the city's treasurer from 1880 till 1882. Tully was elected Mayor of Tucson in January 1882 and served a one-year term.

The firm of Tully & Ochoa went bankrupt following the arrival of the railroad to Tucson. With the collapse of his shipping firm, Tully became an organizer and President of the Pima County Bank. He also petitioned the court of claims in 1890 for reimbursement of losses to Indian attacks that occurred between 1867 and 1870. Some of the lost caravans had cargo estimated at $25,000 each. In 1897, the courts awarded $12,065 to Tulley.

Tully moved to Healdsburg, California, in his later years. He died there on November 10, 1903. Tully Peak in the Rincon Mountains is named in his honor while Tully, Arizona in Cochise County is the location of one of Tully & Ochoa's rest stations. Tucson's Tully Elementary Magnet School is named for Tully and his son, Charles Hopkins Tully.
