= Charles M. Strauss =

American politician (1840–1892)

Mayor of Tucson, Arizona
- In office January 9, 1883 – August 5, 1884
- Preceded by: Pinckney R. Tully
- Succeeded by: Charles T. Etchell

Personal details
- Born: April 15, 1840 New York City
- Died: March 13, 1892 (aged 51) Tucson, Arizona
- Party: Democratic
- Spouse: Julia Kauffmann (m. 1868)

Charles Moses Strauss (April 15, 1840 – March 13, 1892) was an American businessman and politician. Moving to Arizona Territory for health reasons, he served as the territory's Superintendent of Public Instruction as well as Mayor of Tucson. He also played a key role in establishing the University of Arizona.

== Biography ==
Strauss was born on April 15, 1840, to Nathan and Rachel (Adler) Strauss in New York City. His family moved to Boston, Massachusetts, when he was little, and the younger Strauss was educated in public schools supplemented by self study and Hebrew school. He graduated from the Brimmer Grammar School in 1856 and became a store clerk.

Moving to Memphis, Tennessee, during the 1860s, Strauss worked for a dry goods store. He eventually developed business interests in both Tennessee and Ohio. His opposition to Ulysses S. Grant's candidacy during the 1868 United States Presidential Election was the result of an order the General had given in 1862 expelling Jews from Tennessee, Kentucky, and Mississippi due to allegations of illegal trading. Strauss married Julia Kauffmann in 1868. The couple had five children: Rosalie, Gertrude, Mabel, Charles Moses Strauss Jr., and Ruth. Strauss' eldest child died of diphtheria in 1875.

In 1870, Strauss moved his family to Hingham, Massachusetts. There, he joined the Freemasons. Strauss also became active in Democratic politics Strauss served as a member of the Massachusetts Democratic committee and Democratic nominee for Massachusetts Secretary of State in 1878.

Seeking a more favorable climate, Strauss moved his family to Tucson, Arizona Territory in 1880. There he served as manager of the L. Zeckendorf store from March 1880 till late 1883. Strauss soon became civically engaged, serving on Tucson's School Board and in the new volunteer fire department.

Strauss became Tucson's first Jewish mayor in 1883. During his time in office, Strauss oversaw construction of a city hall, library, firehouse, a building and loan association, an infirmary, and graded roads. During Strauss' term, General George Crook led troops into Mexico in pursuit of Geronimo. On June 19, 1883, following Apache leader's promise to surrender, Strauss organized a citywide celebration to honor Crook. Near the end of his term, Strauss encountered some legal issues. On June 6, 1884, Strauss and several members of the city council were indicted on charges of malfeasance in office for allegedly issuing a $5,000 promissory note without proper authorization. Strauss and his fellow defendants were acquitted of the charges when, at trial in October, it was determined the mayor did have proper authorization. This resulted in the judge instructing the jury to return a not guilty verdict. Strauss resigned from office on August 8, 1884, immediately after the city council overturned a mayoral veto.

Governor C. Meyer Zulick appointed Strauss a regent for the newly authorized University of Arizona after several regents had been disqualified for failing to post a required surety bond. He joined the board in November 1886, was selected the boards Secretary, and worked with other members of the board to ensure establishment of the new school before the next session of the legislature, scheduled to convene in January 1887, could resend the university's authorization. This effort included working with fellow regent, Jacob Mansfeld, to the sell construction bonds needed to begin the university.

In 1886, Strauss won election as Superintendent of Public Instruction after running as the Democratic nominee. Following his election, the territorial legislature changed the office from an elected to appointed position. Governor Zulick appointed the recent election winner in January 1887. Strauss was appointed to a second term on March 12, 1889, but his nomination was rejected by the council (Upper house of the legislature).

During the 16th Arizona Territorial Legislature in 1891, Strauss served as Chief clerk to the session. By that time he was suffering from effects of tuberculosis. Strauss died in Tucson on March 13, 1892. He was initially buried in Tucson's old city cemetery with his remains later moved to the Evergreen Cemetery.
