= Boston Emergency Hospital =

Grace Hospital

Geography
- Location: 144 Kingston Street, Boston, Massachusetts, United States

Organization
- Care system: Co-Operative
- Affiliated university: Tufts College (1911–1912)

Services
- Emergency department: Yes
- Beds: 12 (1891); 40 (1904); 60 (1908)

History
- Former names: Boston Emergency Hospital (1891–1899; 1901–1904); Wage Earners Emergency and General Hospital (1899–1901); Boston Emergency and General Hospital (1904–1908)
- Founded: 1891
- Closed: 1912

Links
- Lists: Hospitals in Massachusetts

Boston Emergency Hospital was an American hospital that ran on a cooperative basis and specialized in the treatment of the working class. It was the first emergency hospital in the United States.

== Creation ==
The hospital opened on July 3, 1891. It was founded by Dr. George W. Galvin, who served as the hospital's superintendent and chief surgeon. The initial hospital staff consisted of Galvin, two other doctors, and a pharmacist.

The hospital was located in an annex of the United States Hotel at 144 Kingston Street, where Galvin had an existing accident practice. The building was located in the city's business district, where a frequent number of industrial and railroad accidents occurred. Prior to the opening of the Emergency Hospital patients had to be transported to Massachusetts General Hospital in the West End or Boston City Hospital in the South End or seek assistance from physicians in Park Square, who were not always available. Galvin believed that a small emergency hospital located near the site of most of the city's industrial accident would save lives by providing quicker treatment. As the hospital was only meant for emergency care, patients would have to be sent home or moved to another hospital after 12 hours. The original facility consisted of a waiting room, a large emergency room, private physician's offices, and a dormitory for attendants. The hospital had an initial capacity of 12 beds.

The Boston Emergency Hospital did not receive support from any existing hospital and was funded by Boston businesses and businessmen, including the Old Colony Railroad, New York and New England Railroad, West End Street Railway, Thomson-Houston Electric Company, Walter M. Lowney, the Boston Reds, William Claflin, and The Youth's Companion and its publishing company, the Perry Mason Company.

== Operations ==
The Boston Emergency Hospital operated on a cooperative plan. A patient would pay $1 a year for membership in the hospital association, which would grant them access to medical and surgical services as well as filling of prescriptions at wholesale price. By 1896 the hospital association had 8,000 members. This number grew to 30,000 by 1904.

The hospital had one of the city's first ambulance services. Galvin discontinued it in 1903 due to alleged interference from the Boston Police Department, which had its own ambulance service. However, by 1905 the ambulance service was running again. The hospital was open 24 hours a day, 7 days a week, which was uncommon at that time. Physicians were also in attendance until 10 pm for those who could not make it to the hospital during the day. The hospital also had facilities for and a number of staff members who specialized in the treatment of women. In 1905, the hospital stated a system of home treatment for association members.

In its first year, the hospital handled 16,000 cases. The number increased every year and by 1903 the number had grown to 70,000.

The hospital regularly faced financial difficulties and unsuccessfully appealed to the city and state for funds. By 1896, the Emergency Hospital was $25,000 in debt and sought $50,000 from the Massachusetts General Court. 127 physicians and surgeons signed a letter opposing the hospital's petition. John Malcolm Forbes, one of the representatives who spoke against the appropriation, called the Emergency Hospital a "small and poorly equipped general hospital...that the medical profession in Boston has no confidence in...and thinks not to be encouraged". The appropriation was rejected by the Massachusetts House of Representatives.

== Closure and reopening ==
In August 1899, the hospital was unable to pay its creditors and suspended operations. However, on September 20, 1899, the hospital reopened as the Wage Earners Emergency and General Hospital. In 1901, the Wage Earners Emergency and General Hospital announced it would open its own hospital on the corner of Harvard and Albany Streets. Galvin would continue to run the Kingston Street hospital separately.

In March 1904, the hospital building was closed and underwent extensive renovation. During construction, hospital work was carried on outside the building. The renovation allowed for all departments to be enlarged and three new ones (optical, dental, and surgical supplies) were added. On November 9, 1904, the hospital reopened as the Boston Emergency and General Hospital and began accepting paid patients in separate rooms.

== Facilities ==
Following the 1904 renovation, the hospital building was four stories with about 3,500 for space on each floor. The basement housed four surgical rooms, an outpatient room, x-ray room, the optical department. The first floor was occupied by a reception room, pharmacy, library, eight consultation rooms, and the hospital's business office. The second floor consisted of a men's ward and a women's ward separated by a kitchen. The third floor contained 10 private rooms. The fourth was occupied by the dentistry department. The building was lit by both electricity and gas. The hospital had accommodations for 40 beds.

== Galvin's departure and closure ==
On March 10, 1906, Galvin resigned as president of the emergency hospital due to his disagreement with the board of director's desire to increase space for private patients and run the institution as a more general hospital. In 1908, the facility was renamed Grace Hospital to reflect its expansion beyond first aid treatment.

Grace Hospital fell into receivership and was acquired by Tufts College on June 30, 1911. Dr. Harry H. Germain was appointed superintendent. This arrangement lasted only one year. By 1918 the building was home to the Simon Coat Co.
