= Jim Corbett (politician) =

Arizona politician (1924–2007)

James Nielson Corbett Jr.

36th Mayor of Tucson, Arizona
- In office 1967–1971
- Preceded by: Lewis Walter Davis
- Succeeded by: Lewis C. Murphy

Personal details
- Born: September 26, 1924 Los Angeles, California, U.S.
- Died: June 30, 2007 (aged 82) Tucson, Arizona, U.S.
- Resting place: Evergreen Cemetery; Tucson, Arizona
- Party: Democratic
- Education: University of Arizona

James Nielson Corbett Jr. (September 26, 1924 – June 30, 2007) was an Arizona politician. He was a member of the Arizona House of Representatives from 1956 to 1958, the Tucson City Council from 1963 to 1967, and then Tucson City Mayor from 1967 to 1971. In 1979 Corbett was elected clerk of the Pima County Superior Court, a position he held for twenty years.

Jim Corbett was born in Los Angeles, California to a Tucson pioneering family. His grandfather, W. J. Corbett, opened the first hardware store in Arizona Territory in 1878. His great-uncle J. Knox Corbett was mayor of Tucson from 1914 to 1917. Hi Corbett Field, the baseball park located at the largest park in Tucson, Reid Park, was named after his uncle, Hiram Stevens Corbett.

Corbett served as an officer in the United States Coast Guard from 1942 to 1946.

During his term in the state house, Corbett helped pass Arizona's first Fair Housing law.

Corbett died in Tucson, Arizona of heart-related problems at the age of 82. He was remembered by Tucson.com as "a member of a prominent, pioneer Tucson family and an always colorful character."

== Offices held ==
- Member of the Arizona House of Representatives (1956–1958)
- City Councilman for Tucson, Arizona (1963–1967)
- Mayor of Tucson (1967–1971)
- Clerk of the Superior Court for Pima County, Arizona (1979–1999).
