= James Henry Toole =

American politician (1824–1884)

Mayor of Tucson, Arizona
- In office January 6, 1873 – January 5, 1875
- Preceded by: Sidney Randolph DeLong
- Succeeded by: Estevan Ochoa
- In office January 1, 1878 – January 6, 1880
- Preceded by: John Brackett "Pie" Allen
- Succeeded by: Robert N. Leatherwood

Personal details
- Born: October 22, 1824 New Rochelle, New York
- Died: October 15, 1884 (aged 59) Trinidad, Colorado
- Cause of death: Suicide
- Resting place: Oakwood Cemetery; Beaver Dam, Wisconsin
- Spouses: Louise née; ( April, 1873 - October 15, 1884 his death)

Military service
- Allegiance: United States of America; Union
- Branch/service: Union Army
- Years of service: 1861-1866
- Rank: First Lieutenant

James Henry Toole (October 28, 1824 – October 15, 1884) served four terms as mayor of Tucson, Arizona. The first two terms were 1873 and 1874. The second two terms were 1878 and 1879.

== Early years ==
Toole was born to Thomas and Mary Toole in New Rochelle, New York on October 28, 1824, the youngest of 13 children. Toole accompanied his father to New Orleans, Louisiana working as a merchant. Toole served in the Louisiana state militia as a private in an artillery company. In 1849 Toole joined the California Gold Rush, becoming a miner in Placer County, California.

== Military service ==
On the onset of the American Civil War, Toole enlisted into the US Army on October 14, 1861, in Placerville, California, and mustered in as a second lieutenant of Company G, 5th Regiment California Volunteer Infantry at Camp Union (California) on November 26, 1861. Toole marched with the infantry to Tucson in April 1862. Toole served as acting assistant quartermaster and commissary in Tucson from May 30, 1862, to January 9, 1863. Toole was promoted to first lieutenant and became regimental quartermaster at Tucson, January 10, 1863. Toole transferred to Company D at Tucson May 19, 1863. Toole transferred to Company C, 1st California Veteran Infantry Battalion at Las Cruces, New Mexico November 28, 1864. On April 5, 1865, Toole was honorably discharged at Franklin in El Paso, Texas.

== Post Civil War ==
Upon discharge from the army, Toole returned to Tucson, Arizona, becoming one of the most important businessmen of southern Arizona.

On September 7, 1868, Toole was appointed adjutant general of the Territory of Arizona with the rank of lieutenant colonel. He resigned the position shortly after on December 15, 1868.

On October 3, 1870, Governor Anson P. K. Safford appointed Toole to the Pima County Board of Supervisors to fill the vacancy created by the resignation of E. N. Fish.

Toole served two one-year terms as mayor of the village of Tucson 1873 and 1874, and again two terms as mayor 1878 and 1879.

== Named after James Toole ==
Toole Avenue in downtown Tucson was named in 1879 in honor of James Toole.
