= Ira Erven Huffman =

American politician (1870–1955)

Mayor of Tucson, Arizona
- In office January 2, 1912 – January 4, 1915
- Preceded by: Preston Jacobus
- Succeeded by: Johnston Knox Corbett

Personal details
- Born: March 13, 1870 Versailles, Indiana
- Died: February 18, 1955 (aged 84) Tucson, Arizona
- Resting place: Evergreen Cemetery; Tucson, Arizona
- Party: Democratic
- Spouse: Edith née Gillmore
- Children: Ira Erven Jr.; (1912–1917); Alice

Military service
- Allegiance: United States of America
- Branch/service: United States Army
- Years of service: 1917-1919
- Rank: Major
- Unit: 158th Infantry Medical Corps
- Battles/wars: Pancho Villa Expedition; World War I

Ira Erven Huffman (March 13, 1870 – February 18, 1955) was mayor of Tucson, Arizona, from January 2, 1912, to January 4, 1915, and was Tucson's first mayor elected under statehood. Huffman was a medical doctor who was a member of the State Board of Medical Examiners. In 1914 Huffman was president of Arizona State Medical Association.

== Biography ==
Huffman was born on March 13, 1870, near Versailles, Indiana, to Martha née Shackelford and John W. Huffman, First Lieutenant in the 68th Indiana Infantry Regiment during the Civil War. Later the same year the family moved to Polk County, Iowa, where Huffman was educated in public schools. He received a Doctor of Medicine degree from Drake University in Des Moines, Iowa, in 1901. After graduation he became district physician of Greene County in Paton, Iowa. From 1902 and 1906 Huffman was city physician in Beaver, Utah. Huffman moved to Tucson, Arizona in 1907, and continued to practice medicine there until he retired in 1945.

=== Public office ===
Huffman was a Tucson City Councilman. In December 1910 he defeated the Republican candidate Percy Rider "by a good majority" to be elected mayor of Tucson. He was reelected unopposed in 1912. During his term streets were paved and graded, public parks were improved, and the price of electric light reduced. In 1914 Huffman ran for a third term but was defeated by the Republican challenger J. Knox Corbett by 300 votes in an "extremely heavy vote".

As mayor, Huffman officiated over the opening of the long-distance telephone line from Tucson to El Paso, Texas, in September 1911. Huffman spoke with Mayor Kelly of El Paso for five minutes, inviting him to visit Tucson.

Huffman was "instrumental" in bringing the YMCA to Tucson in 1914.

Huffman was medical director of the University of Arizona from 1941 until 1945.

=== Military service ===
Huffman was a captain in the Medical Corps of the Arizona National Guard. He mobilized with the Guard in Ajo and Naco during the Pancho Villa Expedition.

On August 5, 1917, the Arizona National Guard was inducted into Federal Service. During World War I, Huffman served overseas as a major in the 158th Infantry Medical Corps from 1917 until June 1919. After the war Huffman led a group of men who obtained Pastime Park, an old recreation spot located north of the city, as Tucson's first hospital for veterans with tuberculosis. The Pastime Park hospital would become the Southern Arizona Veterans Affairs Hospital.

=== Membership in professional and personal organizations ===
Huffman was a member of the American Medical Association, Arizona State, and Pima County Medical Societies.

He was a member of the Masons, the Knights of Pythias, and held the position of Noble Grand of the Independent Order of Odd Fellows.

In 1913 Huffman was president of the Arizona Rifle Association.

=== Personal life ===
Huffman married September 1, 1910, Edith née Gillmore, daughter of another US Army officer during the Civil War, Isaac Gillmore, First Lieutenant of the 2nd Regiment Iowa Volunteer Cavalry. Ira and Edith had a son, Ira Erven Jr., and a daughter Alice.

Huffman died in the Tucson VA Hospital he helped found.

== House ==
Huffman lived in a cottage style house built in 1911. The house is along University Boulevard.
