= George W. Galvin =

American physician (1854–1928)

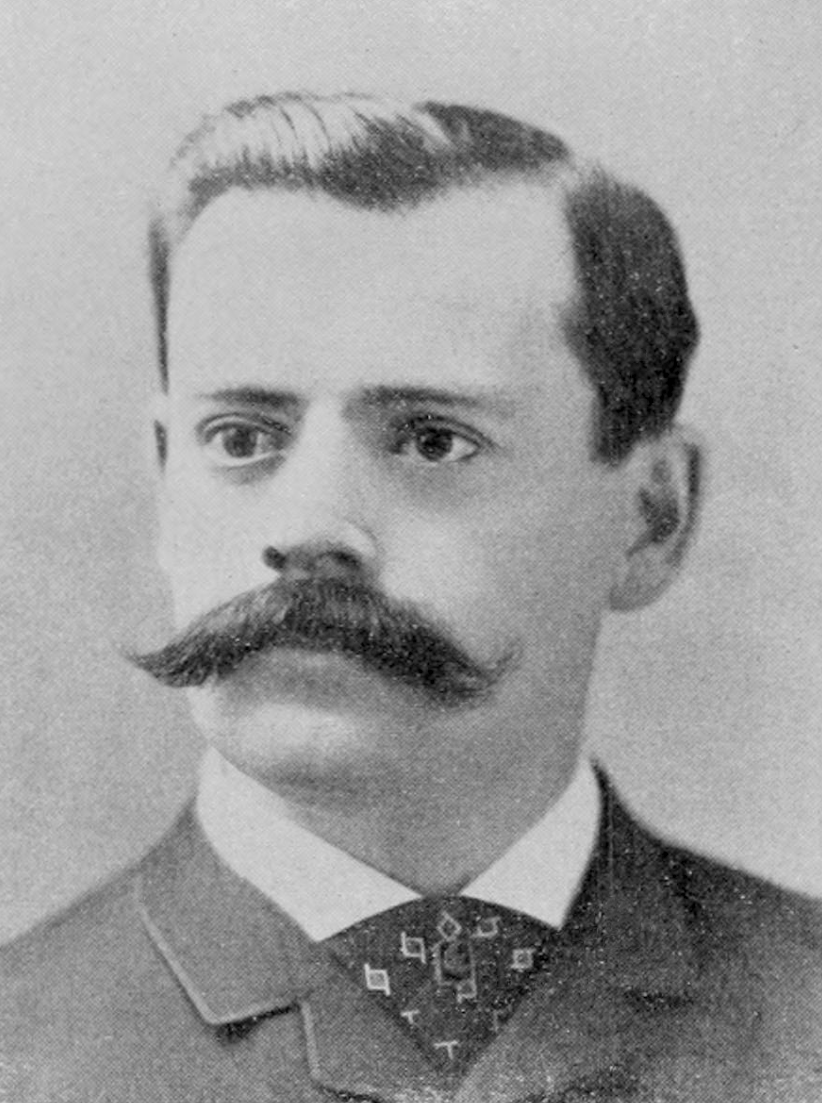
- Born: George William Galvin; May 4, 1854; Somerville, Massachusetts, U.S.
- Died: August 17, 1928 (aged 74); Boston, Massachusetts, U.S.
- Education: Harvard Medical School
- Occupation: Physician

George William Galvin (May 4, 1854 – August 17, 1928) was an American physician who was the founder of the Boston Emergency Hospital, the first emergency hospital in the United States.

== Early life ==
Galvin was born on May 4, 1854, in Somerville, Massachusetts. His father was a florist and one of his brothers, J. Mitchel Galvin, was also a politician. Galvin attended Boston College and graduated from Harvard Medical School in 1876.

== Medicine ==
After graduating from Harvard, Galvin spent a year as an intern at Boston City Hospital. He then spent three years as an assistant at the Massachusetts Eye and Ear Infirmary before starting a private practice in Boston's impoverished South Cove district. Galvin's experience in South Cove made him want to create an hospital that would provide emergency medical services at little or no cost.

On July 3, 1891, Galvin founded the Boston Emergency Hospital. It was the first emergency hospital in the United States. He served as the hospital's superintendent and chief surgeon. The hospital operated on a cooperative plan. A patient would pay $1 for membership in the hospital association, which would grant them access to medical and surgical services as well as filling of prescriptions at wholesale price. The hospital treated over a half million patients during Galvin's tenure as president. On March 10, 1906, Galvin left the emergency hospital due to his disagreement with the board of director's desire to increase space for private patients and run the institution as a more general hospital.

== Politics ==
Galvin was an active member of the Socialist Party. He was a friend of Jack London and persuaded him to speak on Socialism at Faneuil Hall. On June 5, 1903, Socialist leader James F. Carey married Clara L. Stevens at Galvin's residence above the emergency hospital. The ceremony was presided by socialist preacher George E. Littlefield and only socialists were in attendance.

Galvin was the Socialist Party nominee for Mayor of Boston in 1903 and received 7% of the vote.

In 1903, Galvin brought a list of 22 charges against the Boston police commissioners, which included granting special privileges towards specific liquor dealers and discriminating against others, allowing unlicensed sale of liquor Hotel Touraine, and interfering with the activities of the emergency hospital. Governor John L. Bates dismissed the charges due to insufficient evidence.

In 1904, Galvin worked to gain the release of Levi Brigham, an inmate who had been in solitary confinement at the Bridgewater State Hospital for two and a half years following a seven year sentence for larceny. Afterwards he began speaking out against the conditions of the state's prisons. On August 26, 1904, he appeared at a mass meeting presided by Boston University professor Frank Parsons where he alleged that cruel and illegal practices were taking place in Charlestown State Prison and the state's other prisons and mental hospitals. He had three articles regarding the treatment of prisoners - "Our Legal Machinery And Its Victims", "Inhuman Treatment of Prisoners In Massachusetts", and "Justice For The Criminal", published in The Arena. On October 28, 1913, Galvin testified before the State Board of Insanity on behalf of 43 nurses from Worcester State Hospital who signed a petition alleging poor treatment of patients. Galvin demonstrated "sheeting", a punishment where a bed sheet was tied tightly around an unruly patient's head. Five nurses testified that this was a common practice because they needed to protect themselves.

== Later career and death ==
After leaving the emergency hospital, Galvin ran a private practice in Boston. In 1911 he was expelled from the Massachusetts Medical Society for violating its ethics and bylaws by advertising Dr. Paul Ehrlich's remedy for virulent disease. He refused to apologize and instead defended his actions as the only means he knew to publicize this important discovery.

In 1928, Galvin became seriously ill following a hemorrhage. He spent two weeks in the Peter Bent Brigham Hospital. Galvin died at his home on August 17, 1928, from inoperable cancer.
