= Quijotoa, Arizona =

Populated place in Pima County, Arizona

- Populated place
- Location within the state of Arizona Quijotoa (the United States)
- Coordinates: 32°07′38″N 112°08′17″W
- Country: United States
- State: Arizona
- County: Pima
- Elevation: 2,790 ft (850 m)
- Time zone: UTC-7 (Mountain (MST))
  - Summer (DST): UTC-7 (MST)
- Area code: 520
- FIPS code: 04-58410
- GNIS feature ID: 24572

Quijotoa is a populated place situated in Pima County, Arizona, United States. Historically, it has also been as Horseshoe, Komaktjiuurt, Komaktjuert, Logan, Logan City, and Quigotoa. Its official name became Quijotoa as a result of a decision by the Board on Geographic Names in 1941, which was subsequently changed to Logan later that same year by the Board. In 1964 the board once again made a ruling, this time changing it back to Quijotoa. Quijotoa is based on the O'odham for "carrying basket mountain", although it is a Spanish bastardized version of it. It has an estimated elevation of 2,789 feet (850 m) above sea level. It is now a ghost town where nothing remains.
