= Jonathan Rothschild =

American lawyer and politician (born 1955)

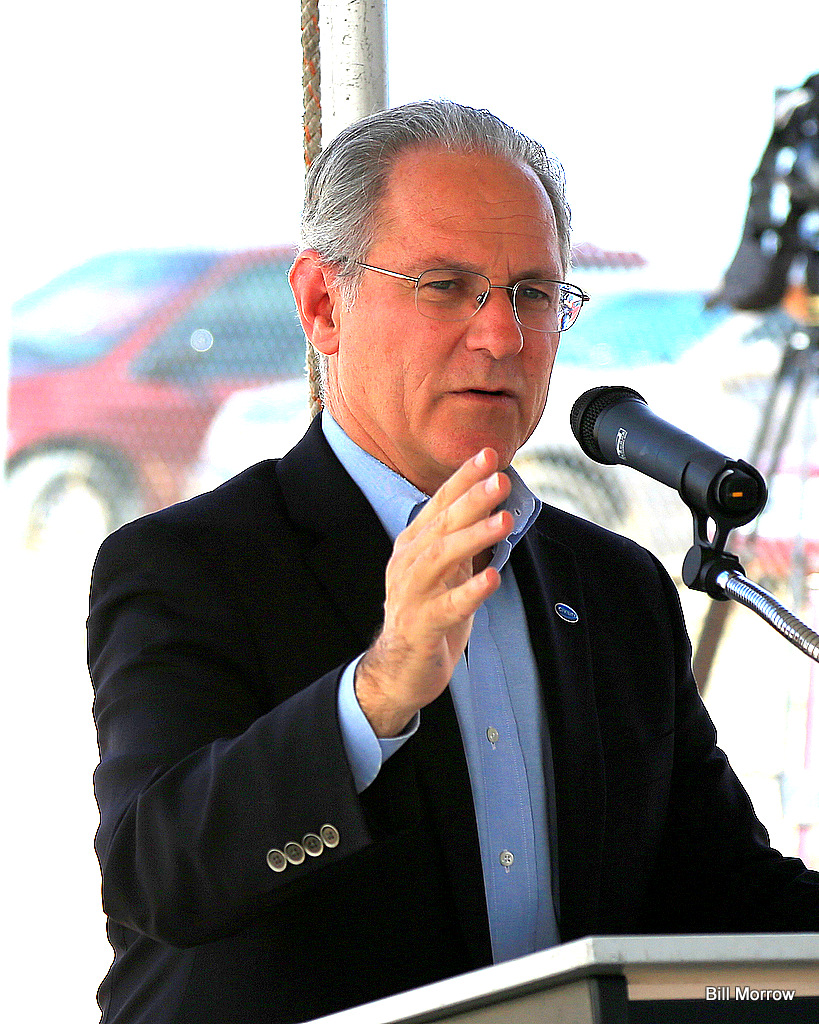

41st Mayor of Tucson
- In office December 5, 2011 – December 2, 2019
- Preceded by: Bob Walkup
- Succeeded by: Regina Romero

Personal details
- Born: 1955 (age 69–70); Tucson, Arizona, U.S.
- Political party: Democratic
- Spouse: Karen Spiegel
- Education: Kenyon College (BA); University of New Mexico (JD)

Jonathan Rothschild (born 1955) is an American lawyer and politician who served as the 41st mayor of Tucson, Arizona from 2011 to 2019. From 2001 to 2011, Rothschild was managing partner at the law firm Mesch Clark Rothschild.

== Early life and education ==
Rothschild was born to a Jewish family and attended Canyon del Oro High School in Oro Valley, Arizona. He later graduated from Kenyon College and the University of New Mexico School of Law. After graduating from law school, he served as a clerk for United States District Court Judge Alfredo Chavez Marquez.

== Career ==
Rothschild was first elected mayor of Tucson on November 8, 2011, with 54.96% of the vote, defeating Republican Rick Grinnell (39.91%) and Green Party candidate Mary DeCamp (4.94%) after running unopposed in the Democratic primary. In 2015, he was elected to a second term, running unopposed in both primary and general elections.

He has also been an adjunct assistant professor of the University of Arizona College of Law and a past chair of the State Bar of Arizona's Committee on Examinations. He has served as treasurer of the Pima County Democratic Party.

== See also ==
- List of mayors of the largest 50 US cities

Political offices
Preceded by Bob Walkup	Mayor of Tucson; 2011–2019	Succeeded by Regina Romero
