= Lew Murphy =

American politician

Lewis C. "Lew" Murphy

37th Mayor of Tucson, Arizona
- In office 1971–1987
- Preceded by: James N. Corbett Jr.
- Succeeded by: Thomas Volgy

Personal details
- Born: November 2, 1933 New York City, New York, U.S.
- Died: December 1, 2005 (aged 72) Tucson, Arizona, U.S.
- Cause of death: Heart Attack
- Party: Republican
- Education: University of Arizona
- Profession: Lawyer; Tucson City Attorney

Military service
- Allegiance: United States of America
- Branch/service: United States Air Force
- Years of service: 1955 - 1958

Lewis Curtis "Lew" Murphy (November 2, 1933 – December 1, 2005) was a US Air Force pilot, lawyer, and politician. He served sixteen years as Mayor of Tucson, Arizona.

== Biography ==
Murphy was born in New York City on November 2, 1933, to H. Waldo and Elizabeth (Curtis) Murphy. He grew up in Clinton, Iowa, the home of his mother. He later attended Shattuck Military Academy in Faribault, Minnesota. From 1950 to 1955 Murphy attended the University of Arizona, receiving a bachelor's degree in business administration. While in college he met Carol Carney, granddaughter of Zane Grey. The two married in 1957.

Murphy was in US Air Force from 1955 to 1958. He flew B-26 bombers while stationed in Japan.

In 1958 Murphy returned to Tucson, earning a law degree in 1961. He was a trust officer at Southern Arizona Bank & Trust Co. from 1966 to 1970. Murphy was appointed Tucson's city attorney in 1970, a position he held until elected as Mayor of Tucson in 1971 on his 38th birthday.

=== Mayor of Tucson ===
Murphy served four terms as mayor, the longest-serving mayor in Tucson's history. City projects initiated under Murphy included bringing Central Arizona Project water to Tucson, building the Kino Parkway, and the opening of the Community Food Bank. During this time Tucson's population almost doubled, the city annexed 63 square miles, and Learjet and IBM opened manufacturing plants.

Murphy's term as mayor ended in 1987.

=== Later life and death ===
After leaving office, Murphy advocated for the community food bank.

Wednesday afternoon, November 30, 2005, Murphy suffered a massive heart attack. He was taken to the Tucson Medical Center and placed on life support. He died at 4:45 PM the following day.

=== Tributes ===
According to Arizona Daily Star newspaper reporter David Leighton, in 1987, the year Murphy retired, Murphy's Overpass was named in his honor. The Murphy-Wilmot Branch Library of the Pima County Public Library is also named after him.

A bust of Murphy is on display in Reid Park, Tucson's largest park.
