= Thomas Volgy =

American politician (born 1946)

Thomas John Volgy

38th Mayor of Tucson, Arizona
- In office 1987–1991
- Preceded by: Lewis C. Murphy
- Succeeded by: George Miller

Personal details
- Born: March 19, 1946 (age 80) Budapest, Hungary
- Party: Democratic
- Education: Oakland University; University of Minnesota
- Profession: Professor of Political Science, University of Arizona

Thomas John Volgy (born March 19, 1946) is a professor of political science at the University of Arizona, where he has been on faculty since 1971. He is also the Executive Director (since 1995) of the International Studies Association.

He is a former member of the Tucson, Arizona City Council (1977–1987) and was Mayor of Tucson 1987-1991. In the United States House of Representatives elections, 1998 he was the Democratic Party's candidate in Arizona's 5th congressional district.

He is a graduate of Oakland University (BA) and the University of Minnesota (MA and PhD).

== Books ==
- John E. Schwartz and Thomas J. Volgy (1993), The Forgotten Americans, W. W. Norton
- Thomas J. Volgy (2001), Politics in the Trenches: Citizens, Politicians, and the Fate of Democracy, University of Arizona Press
- Thomas Volgy et al. (2009), Mapping the New World Order, Wiley-Blackwell
- Volgy, Thomas J., Renato Corbetta, Keith A. Grant, and Ryan G. Baird (eds.) 2011. Major Powers and the Quest for Status in International Politics. Palgrave/MacMillan.

== See also ==
- 2003 Tucson mayoral election
