= George Miller (Arizona politician) =

Arizona politician (1922–2014)

39th Mayor of Tucson, Arizona
- In office 1991 – December 6, 1999
- Preceded by: Tom Volgy
- Succeeded by: Bob Walkup

Personal details
- Born: October 24, 1922 Detroit, Michigan, U.S.
- Died: December 25, 2014 (aged 92) Tucson, Arizona, U.S.
- Party: Democratic
- Spouse: Roslyn Miller
- Education: University of Arizona
- Profession: Teacher, House painter

George Miller (October 24, 1922 – December 25, 2014) was an American politician who served as the mayor of Tucson, Arizona from 1991 until December 6, 1999. He was a member of the Democratic Party. He received both a bachelor's degree and master's degree in political science from the University of Arizona.

Miller served in the United States Marine Corps during World War II. He was shot in the right leg during the Battle of Saipan. Miller served on the Tucson city council for fourteen years prior to becoming mayor in 1991. After serving as mayor for two terms, Miller declined to run again, and was succeeded by Bob Walkup on December 6, 1999. At the time of his retirement Miller was Tucson's longest serving public official, having spent twenty-two consecutive years in office: fourteen years as a city councilman and eight as mayor.

After retiring from politics Miller began teaching political science at Tucson's Pima Community College. He contributed opinion pieces to the Arizona Daily Star on various topics including his support for the annexation of unincorporated areas north of Tucson. He died in a nursing home in Tucson on December 25, 2014.
