= 1897 San Diego mayoral election =

- April 6, 1897
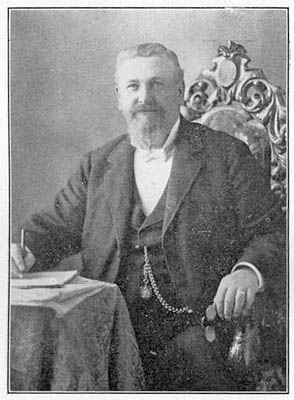

Nominee	Daniel C. Reed	C.F. Holland
Party	Republican	Democratic
Popular vote	1,400	933
Percentage	39.3%	26.2%
Mayor before election
William H. Carlson
Independent
Elected mayor
Daniel C. Reed
Republican

The 1897 San Diego mayoral election was held on April 6, 1897, to elect the mayor for San Diego. Daniel C. Reed was elected Mayor with a plurality of the votes.

== Candidates ==
- Joseph S. Bachman
- William H. Carlson, mayor of San Diego
- George D. Copeland
- C.F. Holland
- Abram C. Mouser
- Daniel C. Reed, insurance salesman and 1887 mayoral candidate
- Henry Sweeny

== Campaign ==
Incumbent Mayor William H. Carlson stood for re-election to a third two-year term as an independent. His re-election was contested by Daniel C. Reed, a Republican, C.F. Holland, a Democrat, and A.C. Mouser, a Populist. In addition to the partisan candidates, three others contested the election as independents.

On April 6, 1897, Reed was elected mayor with a plurality of 39.2 percent of the vote. Holland came in second with 26.2 percent of the vote, followed by the incumbent Carlson with 17.5 percent.

== Election results ==
San Diego mayoral election, 1897
Party	Candidate	Votes	%
Republican	Daniel C. Reed	1,400	39.3
Democratic	C.F. Holland	933	26.2
Independent	William H. Carlson (incumbent)	623	17.5
Populist	Abram C. Mouser	328	9.2
Independent	Henry Sweeney	251	7.0
Independent	Joseph S. Bachman	19	0.5
Independent	George D. Copeland	10	0.3
Total votes		3,564	100
