= 1891 San Diego mayoral election =

- April 7, 1891
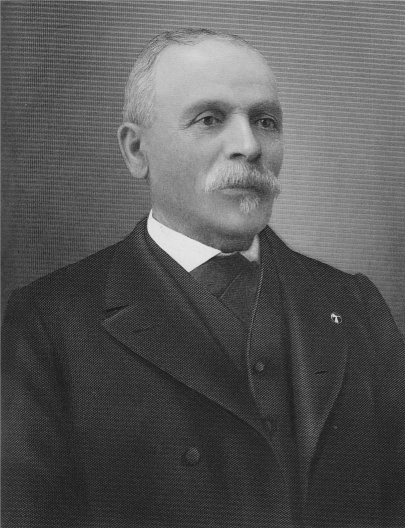

Nominee	Matthew Sherman	J.W. Hughes
Party	Republican	Democratic
Popular vote	1,282	1,251
Percentage	50.6%	49.4%
Mayor before election
Douglas Gunn
Republican
Elected mayor
Matthew Sherman
Republican

The 1891 San Diego mayoral election was held on April 7, 1891, to elect the mayor for San Diego. Matthew Sherman was elected Mayor with a majority of the votes.

== Candidates ==
- Matthew Sherman
- J.W. Hughes

== Campaign ==
Unlike the 1889 election, which was contested solely between Republicans on different tickets, the 1891 featured candidates from both the Republicans and the Democrats. Matthew Sherman was the candidate on the Republican side running against J.W. Hughes on the Democratic side.

On April 7, 1891, Sherman was elected mayor with 50.6 percent of the vote to Hughes's 49.4 percent.

== Election results ==
San Diego mayoral election, 1891
Party	Candidate	Votes	%
Republican	Matthew Sherman	1,282	50.6
Democratic	J.W. Hughes	1,251	49.4
Total votes		2,533	100
