= 1889 San Diego mayoral election =

- April 2, 1889
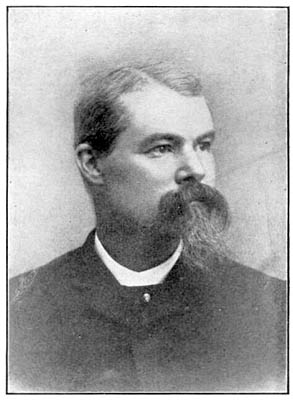

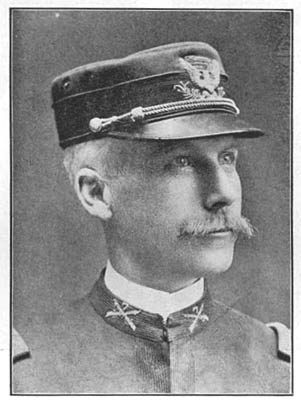
Nominee	Douglas Gunn	John R. Berry
Party	Republican	Republican
Popular vote	1,817	1,294
Percentage	58.4%	41.6%
Mayor before election
Martin D. Hamilton (acting)
Republican
Elected mayor
Douglas Gunn
Republican

The 1889 San Diego mayoral election was held on April 2, 1889, to elect the mayor for San Diego. Douglas Gunn was elected Mayor with a majority of the votes.

== Candidates ==
- Douglas Gunn, businessman and former newspaper proprietor
- John R. Berry, newspaper proprietor

== Campaign ==
In November 1888, incumbent Mayor William Jefferson Hunsaker resigned from office prior to the completion of his term in office. Council president Martin D. Hamilton served as acting mayor until the 1889 election could be held.

The 1889 campaign featured two Republican newspaper proprietors. Douglas Gunn ran on the non-partisan Citizens' ticket. John R. Berry ran on the Straight Republican ticket.

On April 2, 1889, Gunn was elected mayor with 58.4 percent of the vote to Berry's 41.6 percent.

== Election results ==
San Diego mayoral election, 1889
Party	Candidate	Votes	%
Republican	Douglas Gunn	1,817	58.4
Republican	John Berry	1,294	41.6
Total votes		3,111	100
