= 1895 San Diego mayoral election =

- April 2, 1895
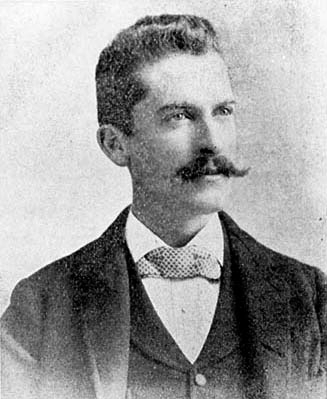

Nominee	William H. Carlson	Daniel Stone
Party	Independent	Populist
Popular vote	1,090	1,015
Percentage	33.9%	31.6%
Mayor before election
William H. Carlson
Independent
Elected mayor
William H. Carlson
Independent

The 1895 San Diego mayoral election was held on April 2, 1895, to elect the mayor for San Diego. Incumbent Mayor William H. Carlson was reelected Mayor with a plurality of the votes.

== Candidates ==
- William H. Carlson, mayor of San Diego
- Charles S. Hamilton
- W.A. Sloane, judge
- Daniel Stone

== Campaign ==
Incumbent Mayor William H. Carlson stood for re-election to a second term as an independent. His reelection was contested by W.A. Sloane, a Republican, Charles S. Hamilton, a Democrat, and Daniel Stone, a Populist.

On April 2, 1895, Carlson was narrowly re-elected mayor with a plurality of 33.9 percent of the vote. Stone came in second with 31.6 percent of the vote. Sloane and Hamilton trailed behind with 18.1 percent and 16.4 percent respectively.

== Election results ==
San Diego mayoral election, 1895
Party	Candidate	Votes	%
Independent	William H. Carlson (incumbent)	1,090	33.9
Populist	Daniel Stone	1,015	31.6
Republican	W.A. Sloane	580	18.1
Democratic	Charles S. Hamilton	528	16.4
Total votes		3,213	100
