= Hunsecker =

Hunsecker was originally an anglicized version of the surname, Hunziker. Hunsecker may refer to:

- a variant of the surname Hunziker
- Hunsecker, Pennsylvania, a community in Lancaster County, Pennsylvania
- J. J. Hunsecker, a character in the book, film, and musical Sweet Smell of Success
