= Hunziker =

Hunziker is a surname from Switzerland. The name most likely originates from the name of a small village in Canton Lucerne. Within Switzerland, the family expanded with a large presence in the Kulm, Zofingen, and Aarau districts of Canton Aargau and smaller concentrations in Cantons Bern, Lucerne, and Zürich. Significant emigration to the United States and Canada has occurred over several centuries. In the U.S., the name has commonly been anglicized to Hunsaker, Hunsicker, Hunsinger, Huntsinger, Hunsucker and many other variants.

== Switzerland ==
=== Origin of the name ===
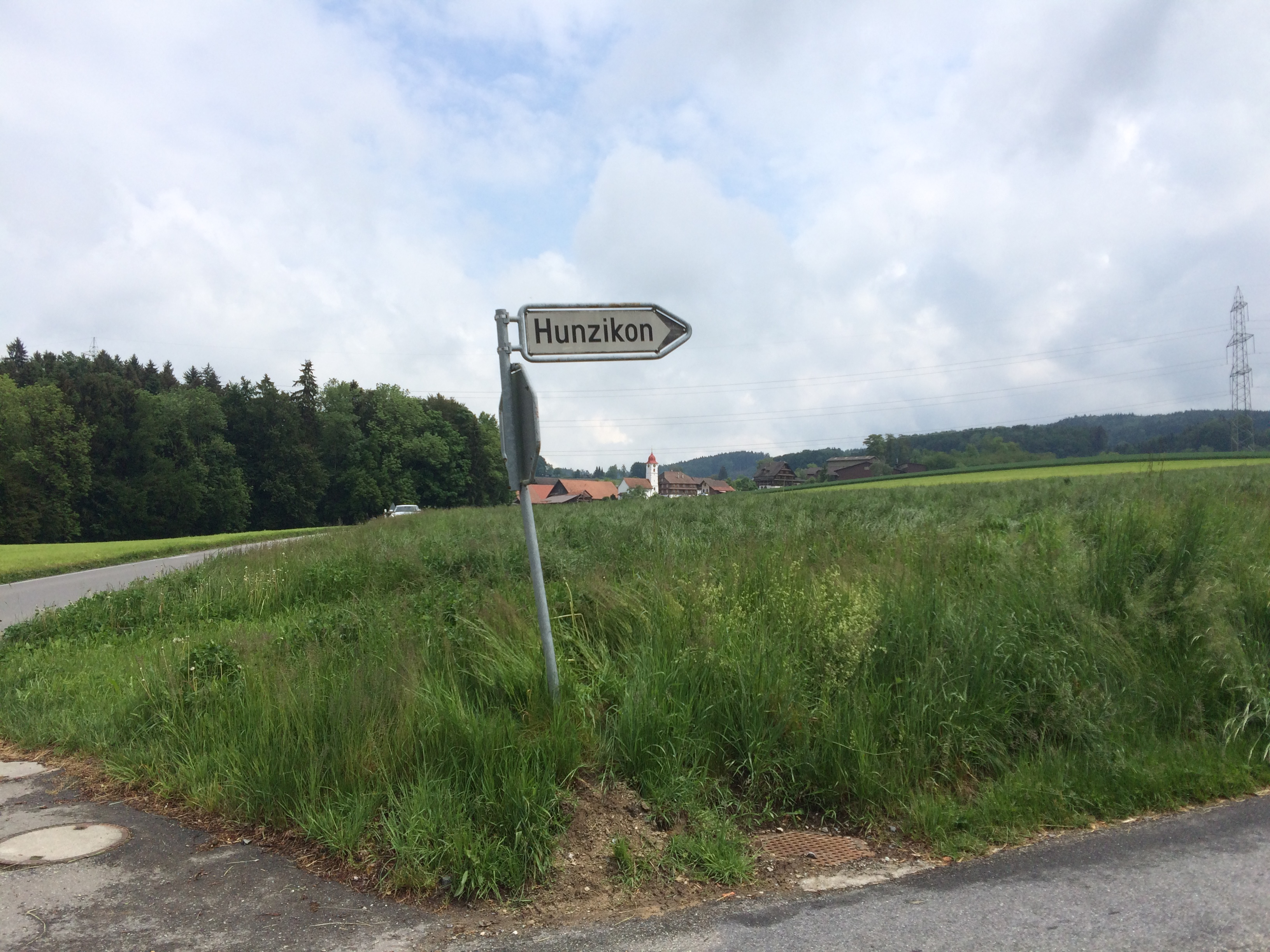
Road sign to Hunzikon, Canton Lucerne

While several explanations exist for the origin of the surname Hunziker, the following appears to be that stated by most, if not all, Swiss historians. In the 13th and 14th centuries, surnames often indicated a person's hometown. Hunzikers originated in the 13th century from a very small village called Hunzingen (today called Hunzikon, just east of Geuensee, Canton Lucerne). In the 14th century, the family was also found in large numbers in the Wetzwil neighborhood of Schlierbach, Canton Lucerne and then spread throughout the Suhrental (Suhre River valley). In the 15th and 16th century, Swiss surnames were derived by appending the syllable –er (this largely replaced the practice of using the "von" prefix).

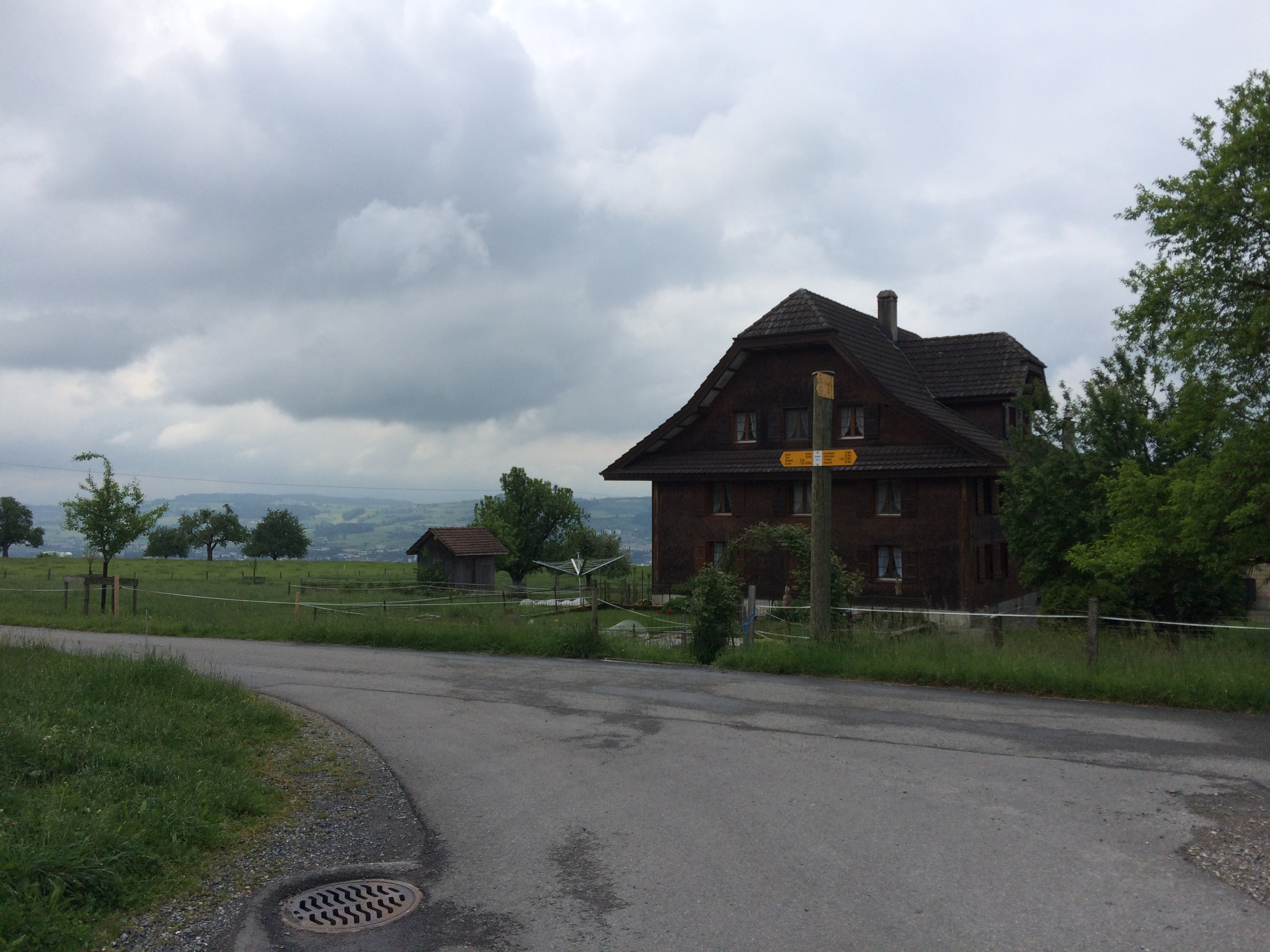
View from small hamlet of Hunzikon, origination of Hunzikers. Looking west across the Suhre.

Several Hunzikers living in Aargau have expressed a belief that the surname descends from the traditional occupation of dog breeder (Hundezüchter) and have indicated that Hunzikers have been involved with the development of several dog breeds. This belief is supported in part by the rampant hound regularly found in Hunziker coats of arms. Another possible origin raised by some genealogists is a reference to a valley in which a Hun army camped. A valley or part thereof might be referred to as a corner or "ecke" in German and hence the Hun's valley would be "Hunsecke". However, these explanations appear to be speculative.

=== Early history ===
During the 15th and 16th centuries, most Hunzikers belonged to Reformed Protestant denominations and lived largely in and near Unteraargau. From 1415 to 1798, this part of Aargau belonged to the old state of Bern, from 1798 to 1803 to the mini-canton of Aargau and in 1803 was merged and made part of the modern Canton Aargau.

By the early 16th century, records demonstrate that a master named Hans Hunziker lived in Aarau. His sons, Niklaus and Hans, became significantly involved with the urban upper class. Niklaus was a member of the court in 1547 and city council in 1566. His son was an Aarau Schultheiß and his brothers also held offices. In the 17th century, family members were influential Schultheiß, councilors and pastors. In the 18th century, Hunzikers became heavily involved in the Aargau textile industry. About 1780, Johann Jakob Hunziker founded a textile firm in Aarau. The factory erected in 1821 still stands. Johann Jakob's grandson, Guido Ulrich Hunziker ran the firm until 1873.

Before 1800, persons with the surname Hunziker lived primarily in: Canton Aargau (Aarau, Bottenwil, Gontenschwil, Hendschiken, Kirchleerau, Leimbach, Moosleerau, Muhen, Oberkulm, Oftringen, Reitnau, Staffelbach, Unterbözberg, and Unterkulm); canton of Bern (Schwarzhäusern, Wynau); and canton of Basel-Landschaft (Arisdorf).

=== Hunziker diaspora ===
Hunzikers in their traditional homeland of Unteraargau were particularly impacted by civil strife, natural disaster and cultural upheaval. Battles of the Kappelerkriegs (1528–1531), the First War of Villmergen, in 1656, and the Toggenburg War (or Second War of Villmergen), in 1712 (collectively, the Villmergerkriegs) occurred largely in and near modern Aargau and reinforced significant religious conflicts in the region. Famine and plague were common during the 18th century. Also during this period, Argovite cottage industries (cotton and silk weaving, cigar production) were devastated by industrialization in England and elsewhere. As discussed below, Bern engaged in a ruthless repression of Anabaptists during the 16th, 17th and 18th centuries. From 1798 to 1805, modern Aargau was created from four distinct areas (Baden, Freie Ämter, Fricktal, and Unteraargau). Different regions had been forcefully converted to Protestantism or Catholicism with even further re-conversions, while others were allowed religious freedom. Government in the different regions also differed significantly. Fricktal had been outside of Swiss control altogether, having been controlled by the Habsburgs. As a result, the new union was not stable. Conflicts driven by rural-urban conflict resulted in the Freiämtersturm revolt of 1830, which was resolved in large part by Aargau canton president, Johann Georg Hunziker. A change from a 50% split of cantonal representation for Reformed and Catholic resulted in bloody conflict in 1841. In 1845, potato rot spread. The 1847 Sonderbund War, a Swiss civil war, resulted in further Argovite casualties. These cultural and economic pressures drove many Argovites, including Hunzikers, from Switzerland.

=== Anabaptists ===
In the 16th century, many Hunzikers (especially from the Emmental) became involved with pacifist Anabaptist movements, especially the Swiss Brethren. The Anabaptist movements typically propounded believer's baptism, voluntary church membership and other positions that contradicted those of the Catholic church, Martin Luther and Ulrich Zwingli. Anabaptists' properties were confiscated. Bern in particular attempted to eradicate all Anabaptists from the canton, sentencing them to galley slavery, flogging, branding and expelling Anabaptist ministers, and, in 1699, established an Anabaptist Bureau specifically to persecute the Anabaptists. Many Anabaptists were imprisoned and tortured at Trachselwald Castle, Thun Castle, and other Swiss sites. Anabaptists were held in cells known as death-boxes. Executions of Swiss Anabaptists were not uncommon during the 16th and 17th centuries. In the late 16th through early 18th centuries, many Anabaptists were expelled from or otherwise left Switzerland for the Palatinate, Alsace, Moravia, Hesse, France, Luxembourg, Lorraine, Bavaria, Galicia, Volhynia, Tyrol, Austria and the Netherlands. Hunzikers in particular emigrated to the Palatinate, Bavaria, and Alsace. Ongoing persecution in those locations led to further emigration to Poland, Russia and the U.S. William Penn invited some to settle in Pennsylvania and, starting in 1683, numerous Anabaptist Swiss settled in Pennsylvania. After continued persecution in the 17th century, some Swiss Anabaptists joined the Swiss state church. In 1693, Anabaptists who remained in communion with those in the state church became known as Mennonite and those who rejected communion with those in the state church were known as Amish. Hunzikers were found in both camps. One of the earliest Hunzikers to reach the United States was Valentine Hunsicker (1700–1777). Valentine was born in Switzerland (apparently in a Reformed household), moved to the Palatine, arrived in Philadelphia in 1717, and became a prominent U.S. Mennonite. In the early-to-mid-18th century, a number of Mennonite Hunzikers were released from the dungeons only upon intercession from the Netherlands and their promise to emigrate to the United States.

== North America ==
American Hunzikers have played a critical role in the U.S. Mennonite church. The name is typically anglicized, such as Hunsaker, Huntzinger, or Unsicker. Some genealogists have speculated that the surname Honeysuckle, found among Cherokee and Seminole tribe members, may be a variant created by marriage of Swiss immigrants with native Americans and transformation of the surname to match an item found in nature.

According to the Ancestry.com name distribution tool, the following number of families were listed in the 1920 U.S. census:

1. Hunsaker (430 total, 74 in IL)
2. Hunsicker (408 total, 224 in PA)
3. Hunsinger (316 total, 108 in PA)
4. Huntsinger (202 total, 29 in IN)
5. Hunsucker (197 total, 67 in NC)
6. Hunziker (179 total, 25 in MO)
7. Huntzinger (164 total, 55 in PA)
8. Unzicker (67 total, 26 in IL)
9. Hunsecker (54 total, 24 in PA)
10. Hunzeker (46 total, 15 in NE)
11. Hunzicker (32 total, 6 in KS)
12. Huntzicker (31 total, 6 in WI)
13. Unsicker (23 total, 12 in IL)
14. Hunzinger (20 total, 6 in IL)
15. Huntsucker (18 total, 4 in MO)
16. Honeysuckle (12 total, 5 in LA)
17. Hunsiker (8 total, 3 in NY)
18. Hunsacker (5 total, 2 in OH)
19. Huntziker (5 total, 1 in CA, IL, NY, OK & PA)
20. Hunsanger (3 total, 2 in MI)
21. Hunzecker (3 total, 2 in NE)
22. Hunsuker (2 total, 1 in KS & KS)
23. Huntsicker (2 total, 1 in MN & WA)
24. Unziker (2 total, 1 in KS & NE)
25. Hunseker (1 total, 1 in TN)
26. Hunsoker (1 total, 1 in CO)
27. Hunsonger (1 total, 1 in MI)
28. Huntsecker (1, 1 in PA)
29. Unsiker (1 total, 1 in IA)

== Individuals ==
=== Honsinger ===
- Clara Honsinger, (born 1997), American cyclist
- Tristan Honsinger (1949–2023), American jazz cellist
- Welthy Honsinger Fisher (1879–1980), American educator

=== Hunsaker ===
- Dick Hunsaker, college basketball coach
- Jerome Clarke Hunsaker (1886–1984), aeronautical educator and designer
- Nicholas Hunsaker (1825–1913), San Diego County Sheriff, 1875–1876, responded to the Gaskill Brothers Store shootout
- Rex Hunsaker (1903–1994), American college football coach
- Tunney Morgan Hunsaker (1932–2005), West Virginia police chief, boxer
- William Jefferson Hunsaker (1855–1933), San Diego District Attorney (1882–1884), 4th mayor of San Diego (1887–1888), represented Wyatt Earp

=== Hunsecker ===
- Ralph Uriah Hunsecker (1914–1995), American composer, lyricist, and performer, known as "Ralph Blane"

=== Hunsicker ===
- Charles O. Hunsicker, mayor of Allentown, PA, 1909–1911
- Christine Hunsicker, clothing entrepreneur
- Eugénie Hunsicker, American mathematician
- Gerald Hunsicker (born 1950), general manager of Houston Astros, 1995–2004, and currently of the Tampa Bay Rays
- Robert F. Hunsicker (1913–2000), founder of Allentown Products (Alpo)

=== Hunsinger ===
- Chuck Hunsinger, American football player

=== Hunsucker ===
- Louis Sager Hunsucker Jr. (1934-2021), American poker player

=== Huntziger ===
- Charles Huntziger (1880–1941), French general who signed the French-German Armistice

=== Huntzinger ===
- Brock Huntzinger (born 1988), American baseball player
- Jacques G Huntzinger (born 1943), French ambassador
- Walter H Huntzinger (1899–1981), American baseball player

=== Hunzeker ===
- Kenneth W. Hunzeker, American Army lieutenant general

=== Hunziker ===
- Armando Theodoro Hunziker (1919–2001), Argentinian biologist
- Bruno Hunziker (1930–2000), Swiss politician
- Evan Hunziker (1970–1996), American prisoner in North Korea
- Frieda Hunziker (1908-1966), Dutch painter
- Hans Hunziker (1878–1941), Swiss physician and professor at University of Basel.Univers and Univers Cyrillic typefaces, and the Siemens custom type family. Instructor at Zürcher Hochschule der Künste, (University of the Arts, ZHdK), Zürich
- Johann Jakob Hunziker (1831-1923), pioneer of botanical printmaking at the Basel Mission in India
- Karl O Hunziker (1841–1909), Swiss educator and politician
- Michelle Y Hunziker (born 1977), Swiss media personality
- Otto F Hunziker (1873–1959), Swiss American dairy educator and innovator
- Richard Overton Hunziker (1916–1971), U.S. Air Force major general
- Walter Hunziker (1899–1974), professor of Tourism at the University of St. Gallen, director of the Swiss Tourism Federation, co-developed tourism science and general theory of tourism

=== Unzicker ===
- Wolfgang Unzicker (1925–2006), German chess grandmaster

== Places ==
- Hunsaker's Knob, Hundred, West Virginia
- Hensingersville, Pennsylvania
- Honsinger Bluff, Montana
- Honsinger Creek, California
- Hunsaker Flats, California
- Hunsaker University Center at the University of Redlands
- Honeyville, Utah, formerly Hunsaker's Mill
- Hunsaker/Schlesinger gallery, Los Angeles
- Hunsecker's Mill Covered Bridge, Lancaster County, Pennsylvania
- Earl F. Hunsicker Bicentennial Park
- Hunsucker's Store
- Hunziker Bowl is a popular ski run at Taos Ski Valley. Ernie Blake named Hunziker Bowl in honor of Paul Hunziker, a Swiss-born ski lift engineer who co-designed the first Kachina lift, but died in a 1971 airplane accident while the lift was being installed.
- Hunziker Hall at William Paterson University. Began as a high school and was absorbed into the college campus. In 1952, Hunziker Hall was dedicated as the college's the first new classroom building. Named after Gustav A. Hunziker, local attorney and benefactor. Hunziker Hall houses: the Hunziker Black Box Theatre; the music department; Department of Women's Studies; and a number of academic classrooms. Hunziker Wing houses: the departments of Nursing, Community Health, and Communication Disorders; The Child Development Center and Speech and Hearing Clinic; the Center for Academic Support; and the Office of Tests and Measurements. Hunziker Black Box Theatre is a 75–90 seat experimental theatre space, designed for small theatre pieces and readings.
- Hunziker House – Disambiguation list of numerous "Hunziker Houses"

== Fictional characters ==
- Harry Hunsacker – fictional, bumbling detective in series of plays written by Kurt Kleinmann, founder of the Pegasus Theatre, Dallas. Started in 1985. In 2002–03, "It's Beginning to Look a Lot Like Murder!" had a successful run as an Off-Broadway production. The plays typically are in black-and-white and often performed at the Eisemann Center, near Dallas.
- Amanda & Michael Hunsaker, characters in Lethal Weapon
- J. J. Hunsecker is the lead character of the film, Sweet Smell of Success
- Nurse Hunsucker
- Douglas Hunziker, airline pilot and antagonist from Rise of the Planet of the Apes
