= Alan F. Wilt =

American historian

- Born: May 14, 1937; Nappanee, Indiana, USA
- Died: May 7, 2005 (aged 67); Ames, Iowa, USA

Alan Freese Wilt (May 14, 1937 – May 7, 2005) was professor emeritus of history at Iowa State University.

== Biography ==
He was born in Nappanee, Indiana. He received a B.A. in history from DePauw University, and an M.A. and Ph.D., both from the University of Michigan. He served in the U.S. Air Force from 1960 to 1963, where he became a first lieutenant.

Wilt taught Modern European and Military History at Iowa State University from 1967 until his retirement in 1999. He was a visiting professor three times during his career, at the Air War College at Maxwell Air Force Base (1982–83), in the Iowa-Arizona London Study Abroad Program (1991), and at Glasgow University (1997). He received a State of Iowa Regents' Faculty Excellence Award in 1993 and served on the ISU Faculty Senate and many university committees.

Wilt was active in many professional organizations, including the Society for Military History, the Western Association for German Studies, and the German Studies Association. He also served on the editorial board of the Journal of Military History from 1998 to 2001. His scholarship made him a recognized authority in World War II military strategy. He was the author of five books and he contributed to 10 others, as well as being the author of numerous articles. At the time of his death he was researching the Anglo-American Combined Chiefs of Staff during World War II.

Wilt was a man of deep faith, devoted to his family and to his work. He had many interests including golf and ISU women's basketball. He was a lifelong Chicago Cubs fan. He loved gardening, especially roses, and he was a Master Gardener. He did volunteer work at the Ames Public Library, Reiman Gardens, and Collegiate Methodist Church. He died in 2005 of interstitial lung disease.

== Selected works ==
- Wilt, Alan F. (1975), The Atlantic Wall: Hitler's Defenses in the West, 1941-1944, (Examines Germany's western defenses as to fortifications, firepower and manpower and the impact of changing military realities and strategic decision), The Iowa State University Press
- Wilt, Alan F. (1981), The French Riviera Campaign of August 1944, (Described the operation and assessed its importance in Eisenhower's "broad front" strategy of 1944-45), Southern Illinois University Press
- Wilt, Alan F. (1990), War from the Top, (Contrasted British and German command systems, concluding that Britain's planning facilitated victory), Indiana University Press
- Wilt, Alan F. (1994), Nazi Germany, (A brief sketch of Hitler before turning to the political, economic, social, and cultural aspects of the Third Reich, gives a historiographical assessment of Hitlerian Germany and its place in the 20th century), Harlan Davidson
- Wilt, Alan F. (2001), Food for War, (Describes Britain's preparations for rearmament planning with regard to agricultural production), Oxford University Press
- Wilt, Alan F. (2004), The Atlantic Wall: Hitler's Defenses for D-Day, Enigma Books
