= 1887 San Diego mayoral election =

- November 8, 1887
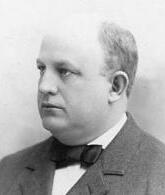

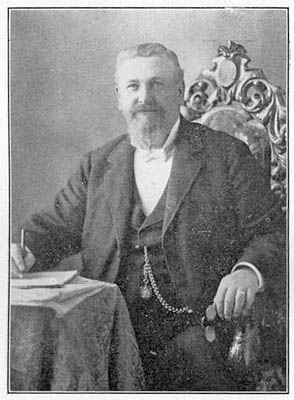
Nominee	William J. Hunsaker	Daniel C. Reed
Party	Workingmen's Party of California	Republican
Popular vote	1,328	1,141
Percentage	53.8%	46.2%
Mayor before election
None
Elected mayor
William J. Hunsaker
Workingmen's Party of California

The 1887 San Diego mayoral election was held on November 8, 1887, to elect the mayor for San Diego. This was the first mayoral election since the position was abolished due to an 1852 city bankruptcy. William Jefferson Hunsaker was elected Mayor with a majority of the votes.

== Candidates ==
- William Jefferson Hunsaker, lawyer
- Daniel C. Reed, insurance salesman

== Campaign ==
In 1887, the City of San Diego adopted a new charter reestablishing the office of mayor for the first time in 35 years since an 1852 city bankruptcy. In the interim, the city had been run by a board of trustees appointed by the State.

On October 4, 1887, trade unions of San Diego met to nominate a slate of candidates to run for office on the platform of the Workingmen's Party of California. On the fourth ballot, William J. Hunsaker was selected as the Workingmen's candidate for mayor. His opponent, Daniel C. Reed ran as a Republican on the Citizen's ticket.

On November 8, 1887, Hunsaker was elected mayor with 53.8 percent of the vote to Reed's 46.2 percent.

== Election results ==
San Diego mayoral election, 1887
Party	Candidate	Votes	%
Workingmen's Party of California	William Jefferson Hunsaker	1,328	53.8
Republican	Daniel C. Reed	1,141	46.2
Total votes		2,469	100
