= 1879 California lieutenant gubernatorial election =

- September 3, 1879

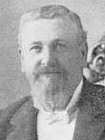
Nominee	John Mansfield	Washburne R. Andrus
Party	Republican	Workingmen's
Popular vote	67,284	42,405
Percentage	41.81%	26.35%
Nominee	Levi Chase	Daniel C. Reed
Party	Democratic	New Constitution
Popular vote	31,226	19,933
Percentage	19.40%	12.39%
- County results Mansfield: 30–40% 40–50% 50–60% 60–70% Andrus: 30–40% 40–50% Chase: 30–40% 40–50% 50–60% Reed: 40–50%
Lieutenant Governor before election
James A. Johnson
Democratic
Elected Lieutenant Governor
John Mansfield
Republican

The 1879 California lieutenant gubernatorial election was held on September 3, 1879, in order to elect the lieutenant governor of California. Republican nominee John Mansfield defeated Workingmen's Party of California nominee Washburne R. Andrus, Democratic nominee Levi Chase, New Constitution nominee Daniel C. Reed and Prohibition nominee George Bramall.

== General election ==
On election day, September 3, 1879, Republican nominee John Mansfield won the election by a margin of 24,879 votes against his foremost opponent Workingmen's Party of California nominee Washburne R. Andrus, thereby gaining Republican control over the office of lieutenant governor. Mansfield was sworn in as the 15th lieutenant governor of California on January 8, 1880.

=== Results ===
California lieutenant gubernatorial election, 1879
Party	Candidate	Votes	%
Republican	John Mansfield	67,284	41.81
Workingmen's	Washburne R. Andrus	42,405	26.35
Democratic	Levi Chase	31,226	19.40
New Constitution	Daniel C. Reed	19,933	12.39
Prohibition	George Bramall	78	0.05
Total votes		160,926	100.00
Republican gain from Democratic			
