= Nicholas Hunsaker =

American sheriff (1825–1913)

2nd Sheriff of Contra Costa County
- In office 1852–1853
- Preceded by: Nathaniel Jones
- Succeeded by: John F.S. Smith

4th Sheriff of Contra Costa County
- In office 1855–1857
- Preceded by: John F.S. Smith
- Succeeded by: James Hunsacker

10th San Diego County Sheriff's Office
- In office 1876–1875

Personal details
- Born: August 7, 1825 Alexander County, Illinois, U.S.
- Died: September 13, 1913 (aged 88) San Diego, California, U.S.
- Spouse: Lois E. Hastings
- Children: 1 (William Jefferson Hunsaker)

Nicholas Hunsaker (August 7, 1825 – September 13, 1913) was the 2nd and 4th sheriff of Contra Costa County, California, from 1851 to 1853 and from 1855 to 1857 and the 10th sheriff of San Diego County from 1875 to 1876.

Nicholas Hunsaker was born in Alexander County, Illinois, the son of Daniel and Charlotte (King) Hunsaker. Hunsaker descended from Mennonites expelled from Switzerland and emigrated to Pennsylvania. Nicholas settled in California in 1847, where he farmed and raised stock under the T5 brand, as well as serving as sheriff. Nicholas married Lois E. Hastings. Lois's uncle was Lansford W. Hastings. Nicholas Hunsaker moved his family to San Diego in 1869. In September 1875, Nicholas Hunsaker was involved in enforcing eviction papers, evicting Luiseño from ancestral lands on Rancho Temecula. Nicholas' son, William, became a well-known politician and attorney in San Diego and Los Angeles.

Nicholas Hunsaker died in San Diego on September 13, 1913 from injuries he received after being struck by a streetcar.

Preceded by Samuel W. Craigue, 1871–1874	Sheriff of San Diego County; 1875–1876	Succeeded by Joseph Coyne, 1876–1882
