= Douglas Gunn =

American journalist and 5th Mayor of San Diego

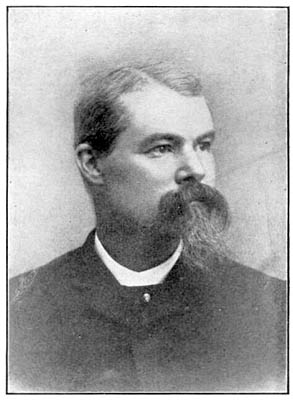

5th Mayor of San Diego
- In office May 6, 1889 – May 4, 1891
- Preceded by: Martin D. Hamilton (acting)
- Succeeded by: Matthew Sherman

Personal details
- Born: August 31, 1841 Wheelersburg, Ohio, US
- Died: November 26, 1891 (aged 50) San Diego, California, US
- Party: Republican

Douglas Gunn (August 31, 1841 – November 26, 1891) was an American scholar, publisher, pioneer and Republican politician from California.

== Early life ==
Born Lewis Douglas Gunn on August 31, 1841, in Wheelersburg, Ohio, to Dr. Lewis Carstairs Gunn and Elizabeth LeBreton (Stickney) Gunn. He was middle-named for Frederick Douglas. His family moved to Sonora, California, in 1852, where his father bought and ran the Sonora Herald. In 1861, his family moved to San Francisco, where his father edited the Times, then they moved again in 1868 to San Diego.

== Career ==
=== Newspaper ===
During this time Douglas Gunn learned the newspaper trade, working for the San Diego Union. He lived in New Town San Diego and walked daily to Old Town, where the paper was published. In 1871, he bought the paper, moved it to New Town, and made it a daily paper. Gunn ran the paper until about 1886.

=== Politician ===
Gunn was mayor of San Diego from 1889 until 1891. When he took office, the city government was relatively unstable. Gunn was elected upon the resignation of his predecessor, Will Hunsaker, after less than one year in office due to substantial conflict with a partisan council. Prior to Hunsaker, the formerly bankrupt city had been governed by a state-controlled board of trustees for 35 years. In Gunn's election, the Republican party ran two separate tickets in the mayoral election, with Gunn on the "Citizens' Non-Partisan" ticket.

=== Civic ===
Gunn's civic works include establishing a metropolitan police department for San Diego, having the Santa Fe Railroad build tracks to San Diego, organizing a company of the National Guard, and publishing an illustrated history of the county, Picturesque San Diego (1887).

== Death ==
Gunn died on November 26, 1891, and is buried at Mount Hope Cemetery in San Diego, along with his parents.

== Sources ==
- Obituary, Daily San Diegan, November 30, 1891, reprinted in a biography in the San Diego Historical Society
- Records of a California family; journals and letters of Lewis C. Gunn and Elizabeth Le Breton Gunn (1928), edited by Anna Gunn. Available online from "California As I Saw It", American Memory, Library of Congress exhibit
- Elliott, Wallace W. (1883). History of San Bernardino and San Diego Counties, California.. Reprinted 1956 by Riverside Museum Press. Mentioned in connection with Union Press on p. 182.

Political offices
Preceded by Martin D. Hamilton (acting)	Mayor of San Diego; 1889–1891	Succeeded by Matthew Sherman
