= Hunziker House =

Index of articles associated with the same name

Hunziker House refers to several historic houses in the United States; including Julius Hunziker House, Marge Hunziker House and O. F. Hunziker House. Hunziker House also refers to the "Casa Hunziker" found in Switzerland.

== Casa Hunziker ==
The Casa Hunziker is a modern single family home and studio designed by Swiss architect Rudy Hunziker for his own residence. It is located off the Via Gola di Lago in Capriasca (near Tesserete and Lugano), Canton Ticino, Switzerland.

== Julius Hunziker House ==
The Julius Hunziker House is a Tudor Revival classic designed by architect Ward Wellington Ward in 1926 for Julius Hunziker. The house is located at 265 Robineau Road in Syracuse, Onondaga County, New York. The Hunziker House was listed February 14, 1997 on the National Register of Historic Places as Building #97000087.

== Marge Hunziker House ==
The Marge Hunziker House is located in the Reiman Gardens at Iowa State University in Ames, Iowa. Constructed in 2001. Surrounded by the Town and Country Garden.

== O. F. Hunziker House ==
The Professor O. F. Hunziker House was designed by architect Charles Wheeler Nicol in 1913 and is now demolished. Dr. Otto Frederick Hunziker ran the Purdue University dairy program from 1907 to 1917. The house was located at 124 Marstellar Street, West Lafayette, Indiana. The building housed Purdue University's Chi Omega sorority during the 1920s. The site currently houses Purdue's Visual & Performing Arts Building.

== Anglicized variants of Hunziker ==
=== Isaac Hunsicker House ===
The Isaac Hunsicker House is located at 4062 Heckler Road, Skippack Township, Montgomery County, Pennsylvania, one mile south of the town of Skippack. In 2007, the Skippack Historical Society saved the Isaac Hunsicker House from demolition. Isaac Hunsicker Sr. was the third deacon listed for the Lower Skippack Mennonite Church, one of the earliest U.S. Mennonite congregations. Isaac the Elder likely constructed part of the house before conveying the tract to Isaac the Younger in 1809. The main block comprises a two-story brick center section (c. 1834) and a two-story stone north section (c. 1845). The south block comprises a two-story stone south section (c. 1770) and a two-story stone section (c. 1845) that connects the south block to the main block.

=== Trach-Hunsicker House ===
The Trach-Hunsicker House is located on the Easton-Belmont Turnpike in Hamilton Township, Monroe County, Pennsylvania, just south of Hamilton Square. The 2 1/2-story house was built in 1790 in a vernacular Georgian style. Constructed of 18" thick fieldstone walls, it is rectangular with a symmetrical five-bay facade. The gabled roof has slate shingles. Brick chimneys are located at each end of the house. A central front door is set under an arched wooden frame with a fanlight over the door. In the 1800s, tiny brackets were installed over the earlier dentil trim and a 1 1/2-story addition was added to the west side. A front porch was added around 1910.

The Trach-Hunsicker House has historic importance due to its builder, Rudolph Trach (Drach or Drough). As a child, Trach emigrated from Germany to Bedminster, Bucks County, where he learned to be a potter. Upon moving to Monroe County, Trach constructed the house and established a pottery on the property. Some of his work was functional, but some was created in the ornate sgraffito style. One signed and dated sgraffito pie plate produced at the Trach-Hunsicker property is held by the Winterthur Museum, Delaware. Trach lived in the house until his death. The surname Hunsicker applies to the owners who renovated the structure and applied for listing.

In 1980, the property was approved for listing on the Pennsylvania Inventory of Historic Places and the Pennsylvania Historical and Museum Commission indicated that the "property appears to meet the National Register criteria.". In 1983, a further letter from the commission's Chief of Preservation Services re-iterated that "the resource appears to meet the National Register criteria and to have a nomination priority as established by the Historic Preservation Board." No record of a National Register nomination is available.

=== Hikes-Hunsinger House ===
The Hikes-Hunsinger House has been listed in the National Register (#75000769) since October 10, 1975. It is an 1824 Federal style residence located at 2834 Hikes Lane, Louisville, KY. Residence of early Louisville pioneers Charles Edward Hunsinger and Paulina Crawford Hikes. Nearby Hunsinger Lane remains a significant local thoroughfare.

=== Dr. Charles Hunsucker House and Office ===
Two historic structures located in the Claremont neighborhood of Hickory, North Carolina were built for Dr. Charles Lamar Hunsucker (1890–1965), medical practitioner and lay leader of the Corinth Reformed Church. The Hunsucker House, located at 266 Fifth Avenue, NE, is a two-story, brick-veneered residence with low hipped roof, dentiled cornice, hip-roofed dormers and a three-bay facade. The front porch flows into a porte-cochere. The Hunsucker House was designed by architect Q.E. Herman and built in 1921–1922. The Hunsucker Office, located at 421 Third Street, NE, is a 1 1/2-story, brick-veneered building with front and side gables and a three-bay facade with a central, gabled entrance. The Hunsucker Office was built in 1952 and used by Dr. Hunsucker for his medical practice.

=== Unzicker-Cook House ===
The Unzicker-Cook House is located at 2975 Oxford-Middletown Road, Milford Township, Butler County, Ohio. The site is just east of Ohio 177 (Hamilton-Richmond Road) near Oxford. The house is named for Daniel Unzicker (1798–1863) and his wife, Magdalena Kahn (1803–1880). Daniel Unzicker was a Mennonite preacher and farmer from Bavaria, who arrived in Butler County in 1828 and built the house around 1831. The house has a fieldstone foundation and fieldstone and weatherboard walls The house was added to the National Register of Historic Places on 24 July 1974.
