= Reiman Gardens =

Public garden in Ames, Iowa, United States

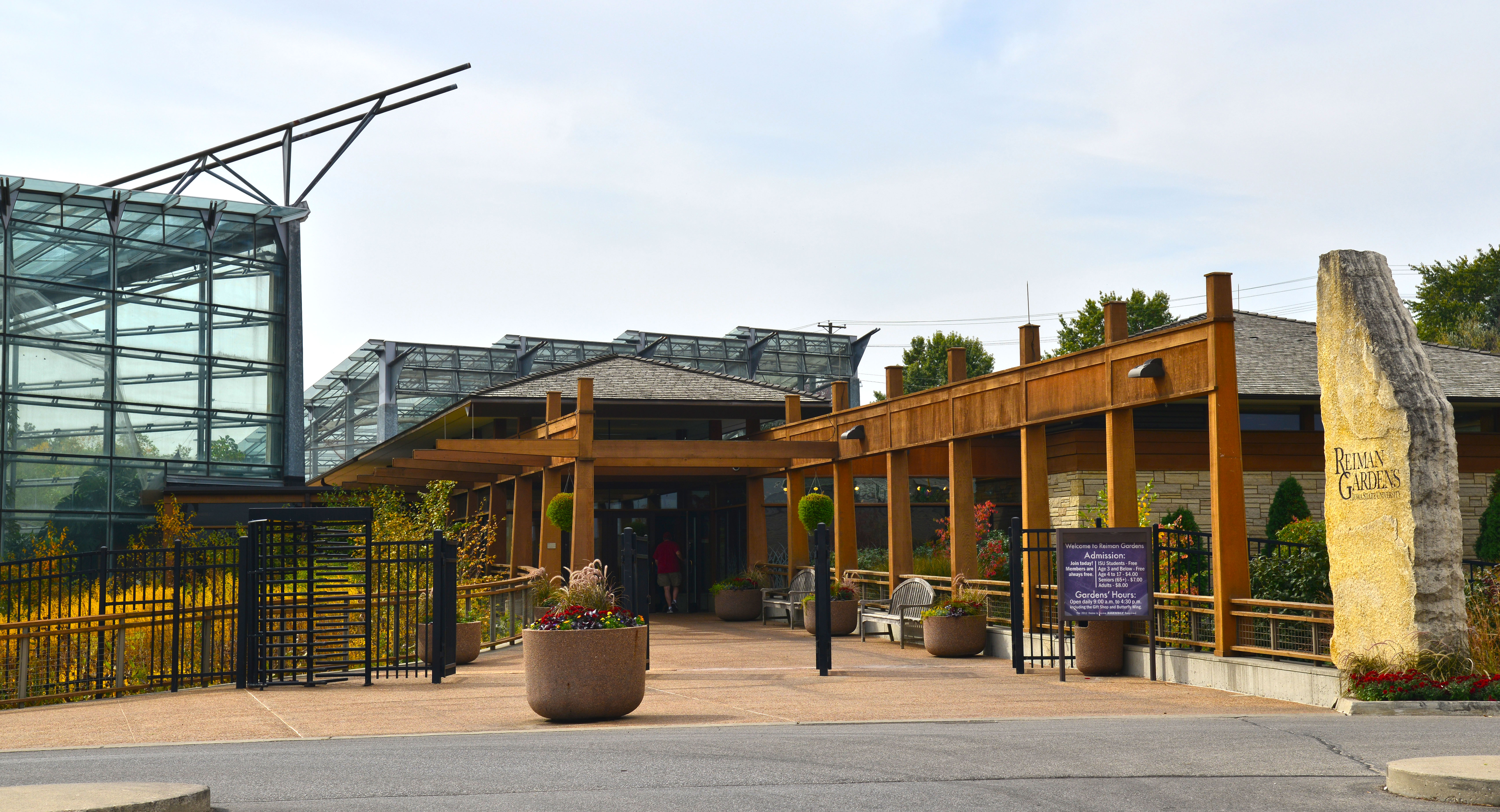
- The main entrance to the Gardens.
- Interactive map of Reiman Gardens
- Type: Public Garden
- Location: Ames, Iowa, United States
- Coordinates: 42.0106°N 93.6386°W
- Area: 17 acres (6.9 ha)
- Opened: September 16, 1995
- Owner: Iowa State University
- Website: Official website

Reiman Gardens (pronounced Rye-Men) is a 17-acre (6.9 ha) university-owned public garden located immediately south of Jack Trice Stadium on the Iowa State University (ISU) campus in Ames, Iowa. Reiman Gardens is a year-round garden with events, programs, lectures, and tours that has consistently been one of the top visited attractions in Central Iowa. In 2023, Reiman Gardens was named a “Top 10 Garden worth traveling for” in North America at the International Garden Tourism Conference.

Reiman Gardens consists of over 20 distinct garden areas, an indoor conservatory, an indoor butterfly wing, a gift shop, and several supporting greenhouses.

It is open seven days per week; 10:00 am to 4:30 pm, with extended hours in the summer season and extended evening hours for its events. The Gardens are closed on Thanksgiving, Christmas, and New Year's Day.

ISU students and their classes are admitted free of charge, as are the Gardens' members. An admission fee is charged to the public.

== Construction ==
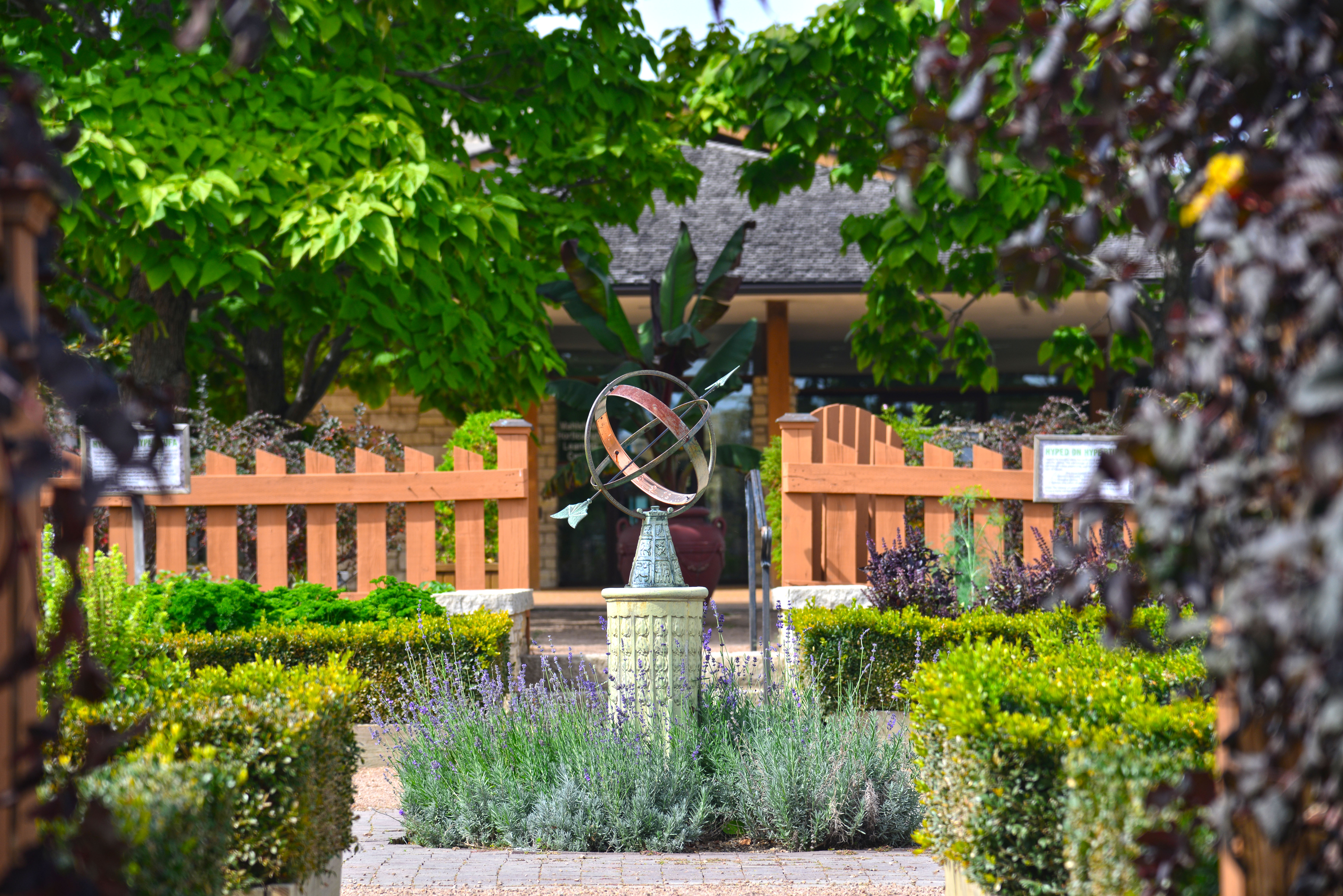
The Herb Garden

Since 1914, Iowa State University has had a horticulture garden; Reiman Gardens is the third location for these gardens. The original horticultural garden was located north of The Farm House at the Iowa State Horticultural Research Station. In 1964, the garden was moved to a three-quarter-acre site on the northeast corner of Iowa State University's campus, north of the power plant. The site was limited, however, because it offered little room for expansion and was surrounded by ISU's industrial zone.

Until 1975 the current Reiman Gardens site was used as a grain storage facility with pens for swine, cattle, and sheep. In 1975 the site was used as a soil borrow area to construct the berm around Jack Trice Stadium and until 1992 the site was used as a parking spot for football game days.

Today's gardens began in 1993 with a gift from Bobbi and Roy Reiman. Construction began in 1994, and the Gardens' initial 5 acres (20,000 m^{2}) were officially dedicated on September 16, 1995. The original Gardens consisted of the Mahlstede Horticulture Learning Center along with the Herb Garden, the Rose Garden, and the Campanile Garden. The landscape design was created by Rodney Robinson Landscape Architects.

In 1998, ground was broken for the Patty Jischke Children's Garden and the garden space opened in June 1999.

In August 2001, The Marge Hunziker House opened, along with Lake Helen, the Stafford Arboretum Garden (now called Sycamore Falls), and the Town and Country Gardens (now called the Home Demonstration Gardens). Construction was completed by Country Landscapes.

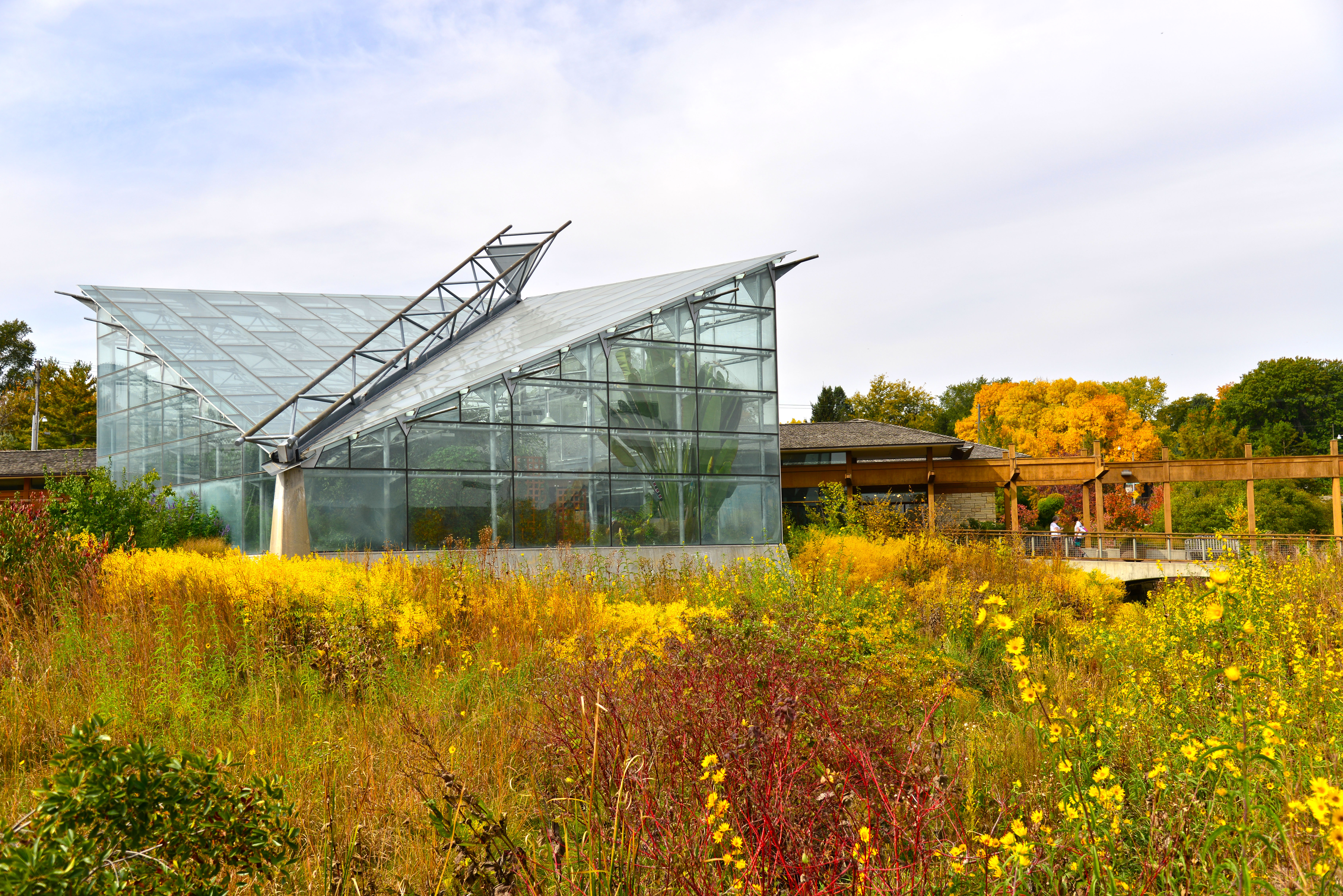
The Christina Reiman Butterfly Wing

On November 2, 2002, the Gardens officially opened its 30,000-square-foot (2,800 m^{2}) Conservatory Complex. The new building made the Gardens a year-round facility with an indoor plant conservatory, a butterfly glasshouse "wing", an auditorium for classes and events, a gift shop, a cafe, an events hallway, greenhouses, a head house, staff offices, and two large areas housing all the heating and cooling and greenhouse systems equipment.

In 2008, a construction project renovated major sections of the Conservatory Complex. The old gift shop and cafe space was converted into a meeting space and became known as The Garden Room. The gift shop moved into a 430 square feet (40 m^{2}) space next to the lobby, replacing the auditorium. The Maintenance Building was constructed just north of the Conservatory Complex, in between Jack Trice Stadium and the Gardens.

Architects Smith Metzger designed the Christina Reiman Butterfly Wing, the Mahlstede Learning Center, Conservatory Complex and Marge Hunziker House.

In 2017, Reiman Gardens gained a new entrance sign by University Boulevard. This sign, a 400 feet (120 m) long wall with 4 feet (1.2 m) high letters, has a garden bed surrounding it that is maintained by the Gardens. The Joey and Jesse's Herb Garden had its raised beds reconstructed.

In 2018, the Hillside Water-Wise Garden opened, the first project completed of the 20-year Master Plan that was released to the public in January 2016. In summer 2018, the DeeAnn Drew Shade Garden opened.

In 2019, the Pattern Garden was resurfaced; the Reflection Garden pergola, the Sunny Side Yard trellises, and the fence around the Marge Hunziker House were replaced; and many gravel paths throughout the Gardens were converted to concrete. A mobile and modular insect display was created for the Gardens' lobby with funds from Alliant Energy, allowing the Gardens to display new insects and invertebrates acquired in 2018, 2019, and 2020.

In 2020, the front entrance to Reiman Gardens had its walkway repaved and the wooden trellis structure was replaced. Elwood the World's Largest Concrete Gnome had new stairs with a railing installed thanks to a donation from John and Linda Schuh. A pergola was installed at the top of the Hillside Water-Wise Garden thanks to a donation from Joyce and Bud Nichol. More gravel pathways throughout the Gardens were converted to concrete.

In 2021, the Sycamore Falls garden space opened after 5 years of construction. This was the second project completed of the 2016 20-year Master Plan. Part of this project added a bathroom to the south end of the Gardens. A pathway near the east entrance was converted from brick to concrete.

== Annual themes ==
Reiman Gardens uses a process called Dimensional Design to create its annual theme. Using a holistic approach, Dimensional Design requires a team effort from all departments. Thus, the Gardens' staff develops educational programs, interpretation, communications, events and amenities that support one theme, which in turn, also supports the Gardens' mission. The theme encourages guests to view the garden and its mission from a different perspective each time they visit. The theme year planning also gives structure to displays and programs and generates innovative ideas that turn into horticulture displays.

Reiman Gardens' theme years:

- 2003 - Year of the Butterfly
- 2004 - Seasons of Agriculture
- 2005 - Global Garden
  - Focused on garden traditions from around the world.
- 2006 - Art of Gardening
  - Showcased gardening as art and art in the garden. Featured the outdoor sculpture exhibition "Cars and Campaniles".
- 2007 - Excellence in Bloom
  - Celebrated Iowa State University's 150th anniversary.
- 2008 - The Novel Garden
  - Displayed garden areas inspired by literature. Featured art pieces and horticultural displays based on Peter Pan, A Christmas Carol, The Color Purple, Moby-Dick, and Alice's Adventures in Wonderland.
- 2009 - The Landscape Before Time
  - Showcased plants and insects from themed around prehistoric times. Featured the outdoor sculpture exhibition "Dinosaurs and Other Common Garden Pests".
- 2010 - Celebration of the Garden Ornamentation
  - Celebrated quirky garden decorations. Featured the installation of Elwood the World's Largest Concrete Gnome and the outdoor sculpture exhibition "Gnome Sweet Gnome".
- 2011 - Insects!
  - Displayed garden areas inspired by those misunderstood and underappreciated insects. Featured the outdoor sculpture exhibition "David Rogers' Big Bugs".
- 2012 - Some Assembly Required
  - Focused on how things are put together and how things connect with each other. Featured the outdoor sculpture exhibition "Nature Connects: Art with LEGO Bricks".
- 2013 - More than Meets the Iowa
  - Celebrated the great state of Iowa. Featured the outdoor sculpture exhibition "Iowa Naturally".
- 2014 - 2014: A Garden Odyssey
  - Displayed garden areas inspired by space and science-fiction. Featured the outdoor sculpture exhibition "Alien Invasion".
- 2015 - Celebrating Our Past and Future
  - Celebrated Reiman Gardens' 20th anniversary. Featured an outdoor sculpture exhibition "InTREEguing TREEhouses".
- 2016 - Color
  - Displayed garden spaces and interpretation that highlighted all the color that can exist in nature. Featured the outdoor sculpture exhibition "Nature Connects: Art with LEGO Bricks".
- 2017 - Water
  - Showcased sculptures of different sea creatures composed of rubbish collected from the ocean in an outdoor sculpture exhibition called "Washed Ashore".
- 2018 - Movement
  - Enchanted with ideas and themes related to wind and movement. Featured the outdoor sculpture exhibition "Wind, Waves, and Light".
- 2019 - Toys and Games
  - Celebrated the child-like joy of playing with toys, games, and nature. Featured the outdoor sculpture exhibition "Nature of the Game".
- 2020 - Wild & Whimsical
  - Displayed garden areas inspired by "wild" nature and "whimsical" stories. Featured two outdoor sculpture exhibitions: "Nature Connects: Art with LEGO Bricks" and "Ribbit the Exhibit".
- 2021 - Patterns Unfolding
  - Connected geometry, fractals, and patterns to nature as a whole. Featured the outdoor sculpture exhibition "OrigamiintheGarden²".
- 2022 - Home
  - Focused on the idea of home and what it can mean to different people and creatures. Featured the outdoor sculpture exhibition "The Lewis and Art Exhibition".
- 2023 - Light and Reflection
- 2024 - Living Landscape
  - Featured eleven life-size, custom-built garden playhouses.

== Facilities ==
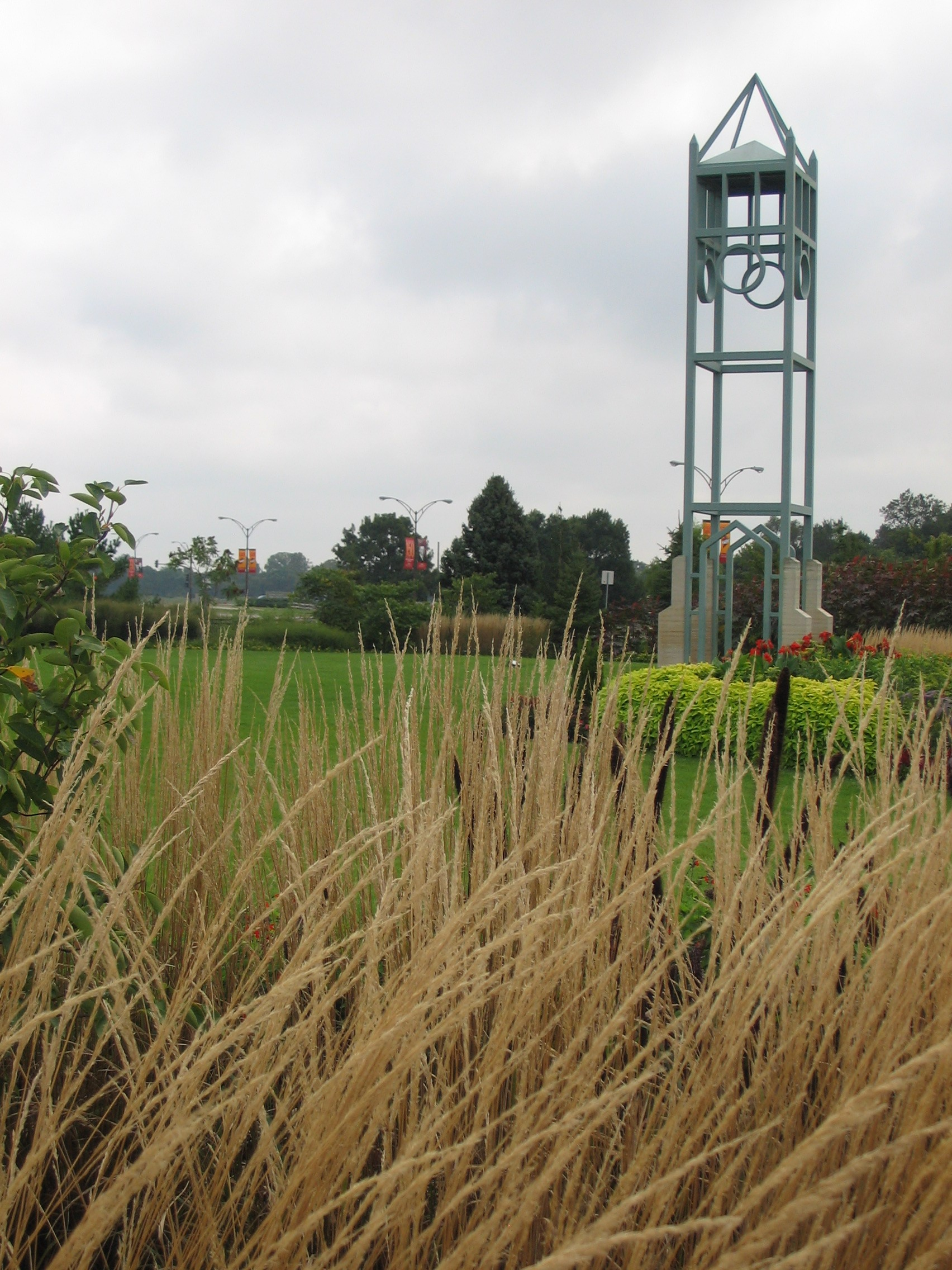
The Garden Campanile

Primary facilities at Reiman Gardens include:

- Conservatory Complex - The entrance to Reiman Gardens, it features a conservatory of tropical plants, staff offices, a gift shop, restroom facilities, and The Garden Room, a popular event space.
  - Christina Reiman Butterfly Wing - A 2,500-square-foot (230 m^{2}) indoor tropical garden is home to up to 800 live butterflies and moths representing up to 80 different species. Reiman Gardens is permitted to display almost 1,000 different butterflies of native and exotic species. The temperature is kept at 80 °F (27 °C) and 80% humidity at all times. The structure of the Wing resembles a butterfly. The Butterfly Wing is named for Roy Reiman's mother, Christina.
  - Hughes Conservatory - A 5,000-square-foot (460 m^{2}) glass house that features a lush, tropical collection of colorful and rare plants among seasonal, artistic creations that interpret garden themes and intrigue guests. Features palms, cycads, and a tranquil waterfall and pond. The Conservatory is named for Hazel S. and Dwight W. Hughes, ISU alumni who donated $1 million to the Conservatory Complex construction.
- Marge Hunziker House - Named in honor of Marge Hunziker, the building dedication was a gift from her husband Erb and their six sons. This prairie-style building was designed by Architects Smith Metzger to represent a home and serve as a backdrop for the Home Demonstration Gardens (originally called the Town and Country Gardens) surrounding it. Inside the building is a large workroom that serves as a program workspace and meeting facility as well as restrooms.
- Mahlstede Horticulture Learning Center - Named for ISU horticultural professor John P. Mahlstede, this building houses restrooms, a classroom, a conference room, and The Speer Room, a popular event space. It is thought to be one of the most beautiful rooms in Iowa with sweeping views of the Gardens pictured from glass walls that extend from ceiling to floor.

== Gallery ==
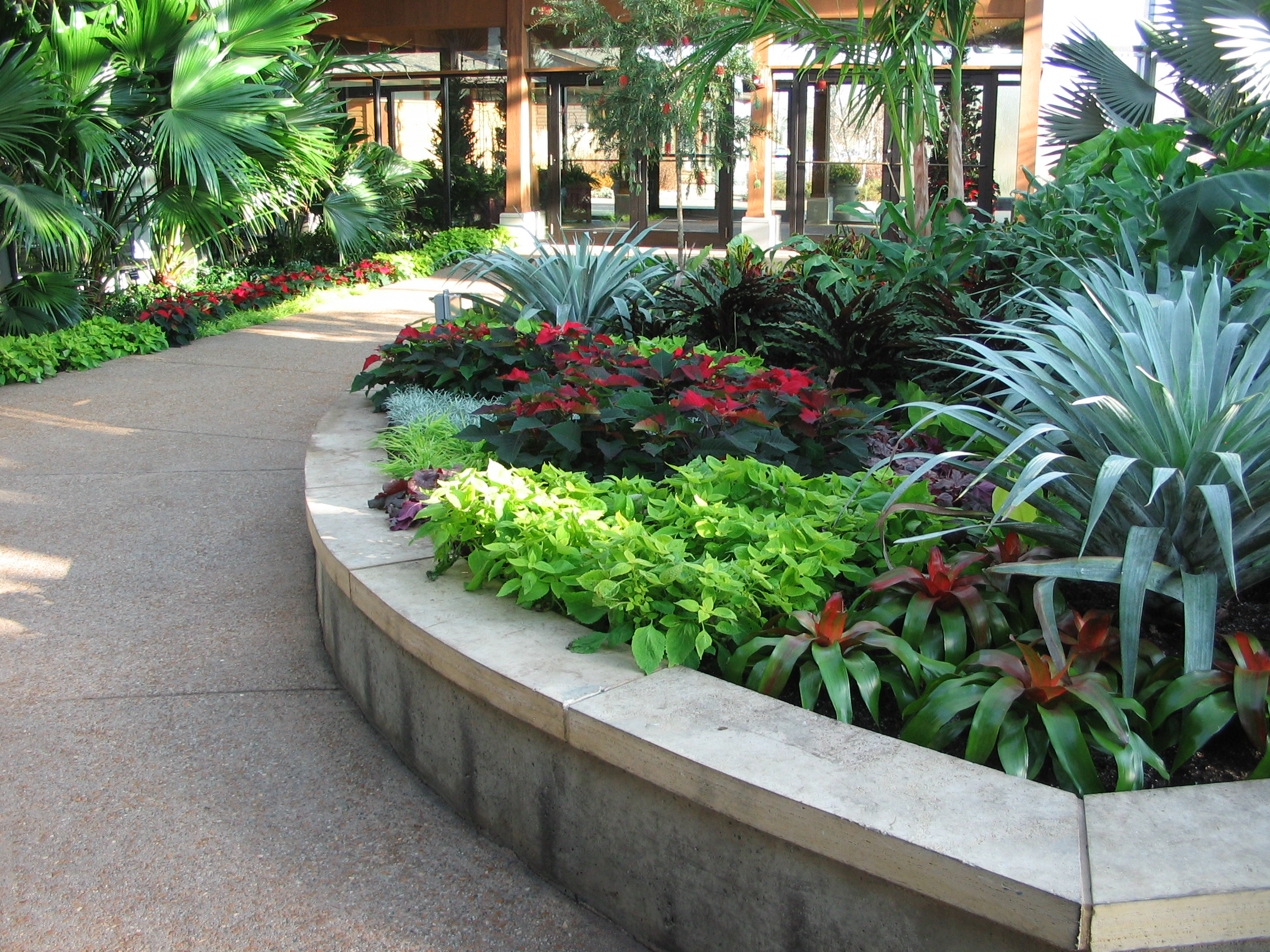
The Hughes Conservatory

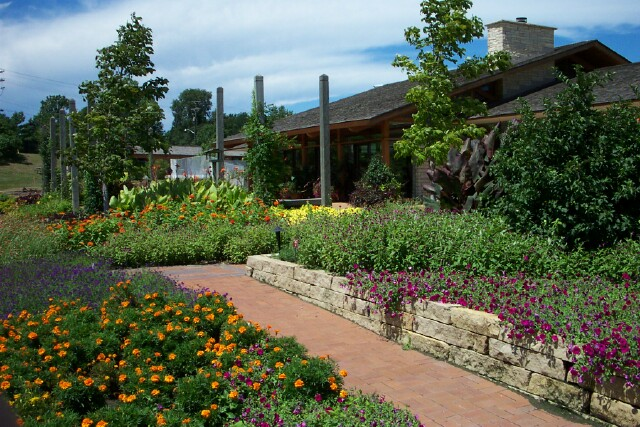
The Mahlstede Building

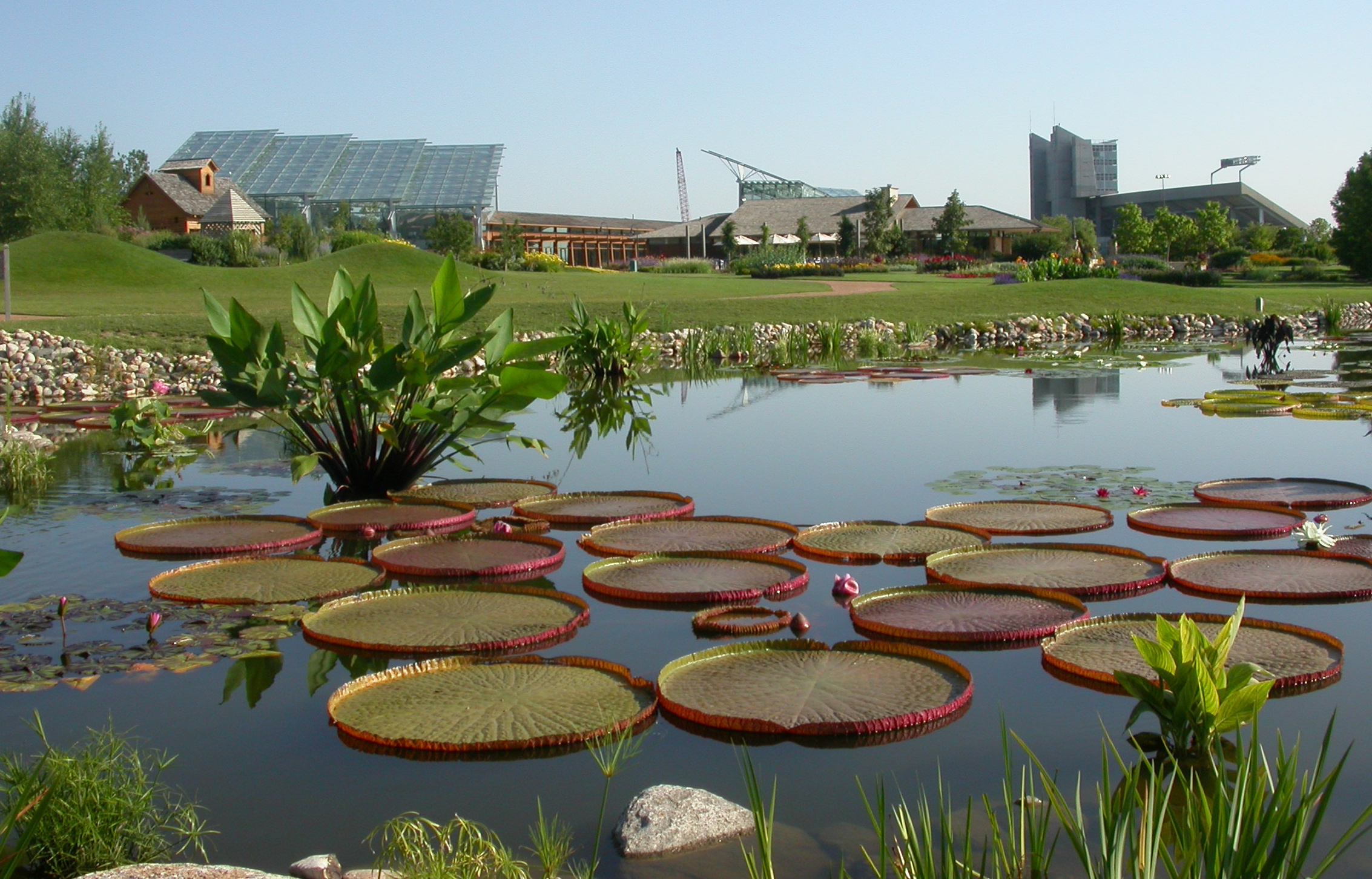
Lake Helen

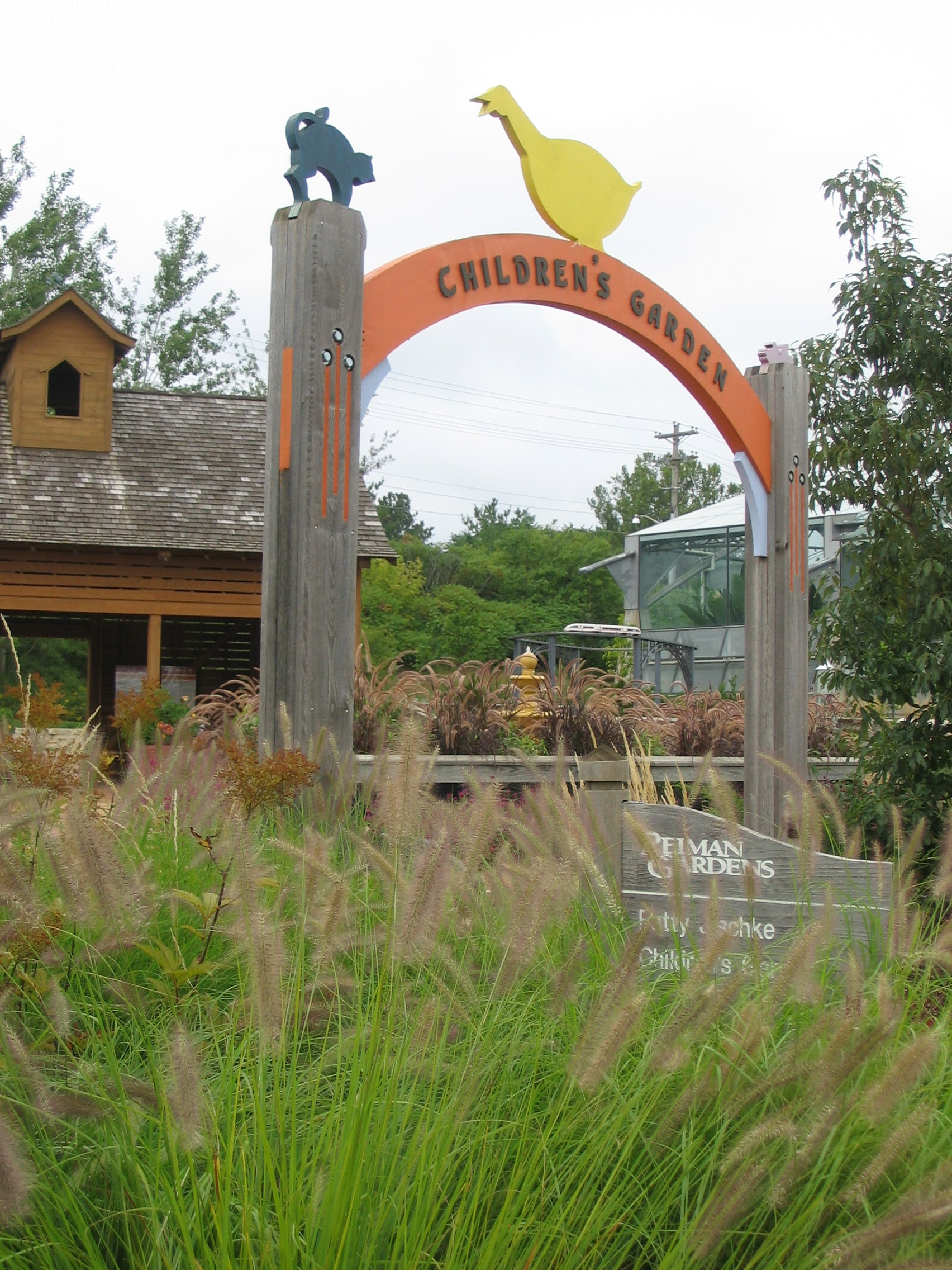
The entrance gate for the Children's Garden.

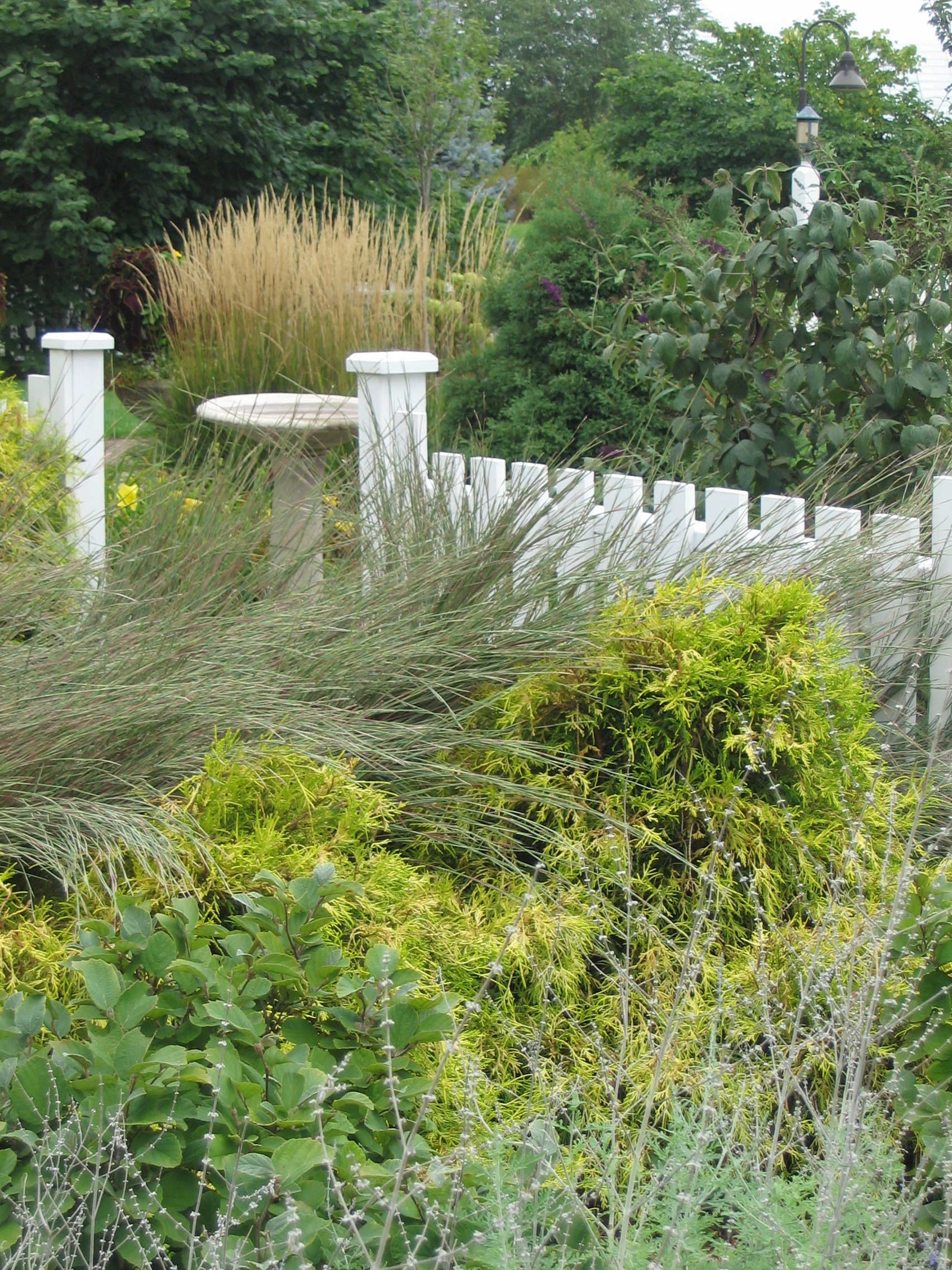
The Sunny Side Yard in the Home Demonstration Gardens.

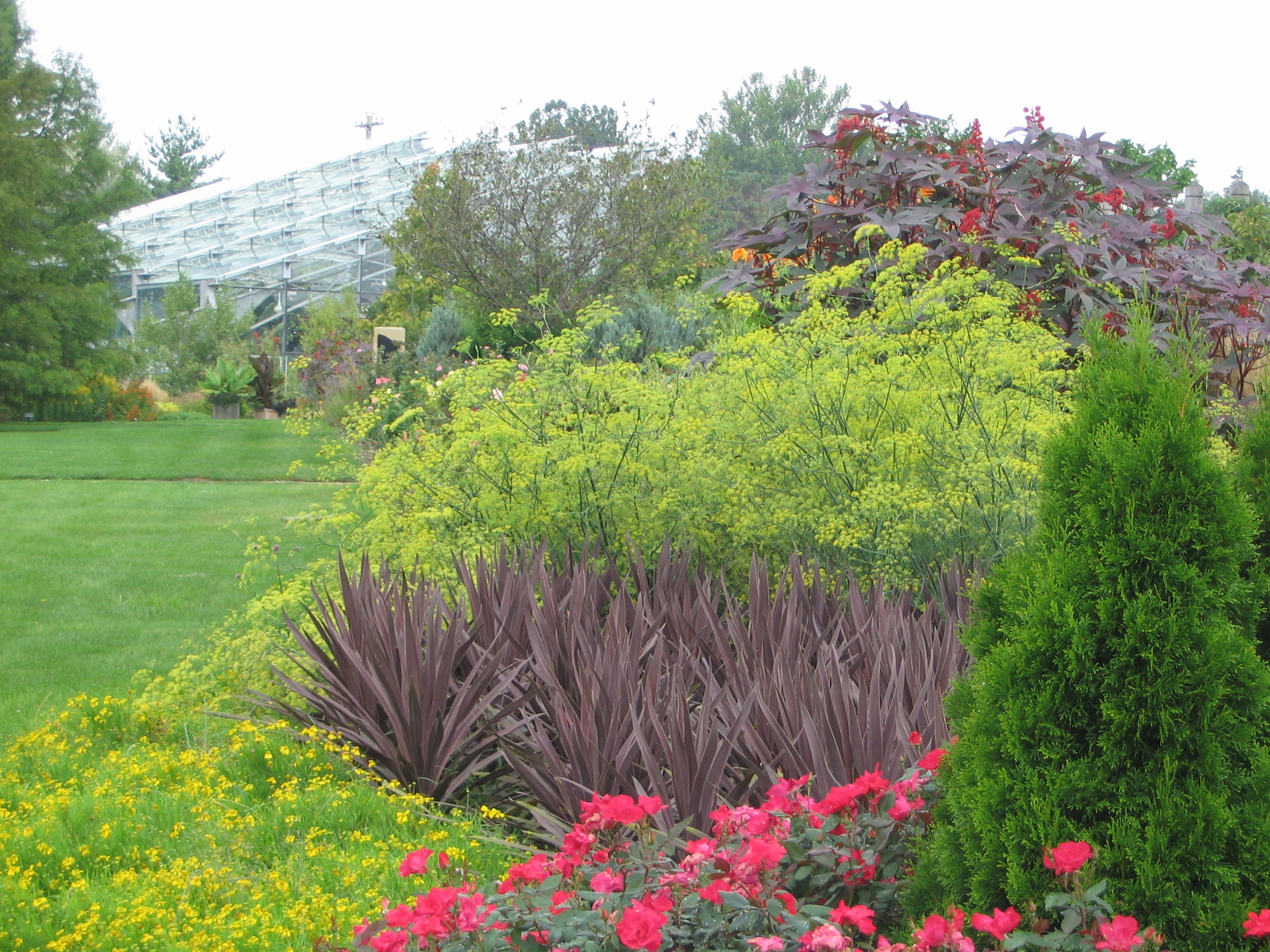
The Conservatory

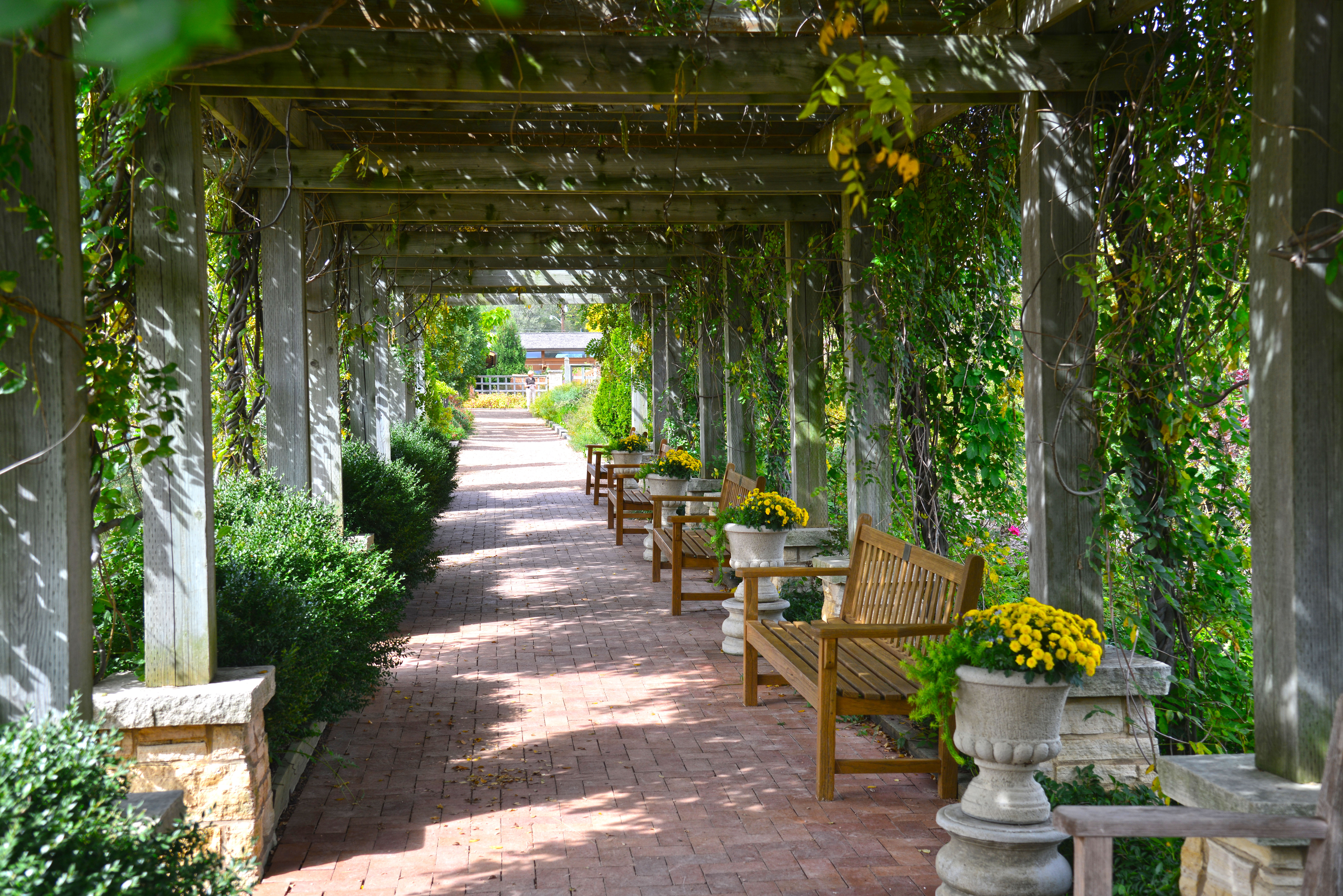
The wisteria pergola located in the Jones Rose Garden.

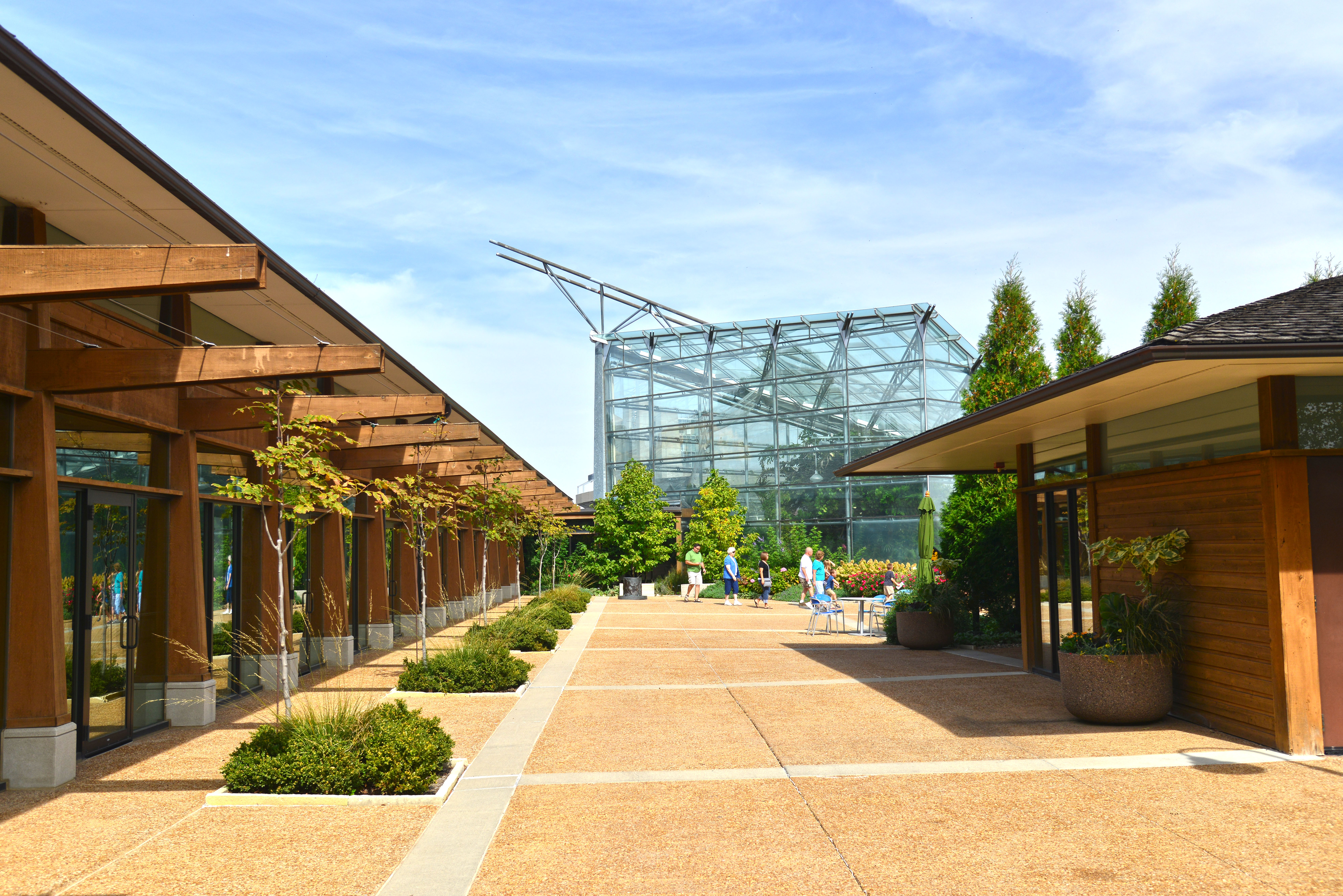
Rust Events Plaza

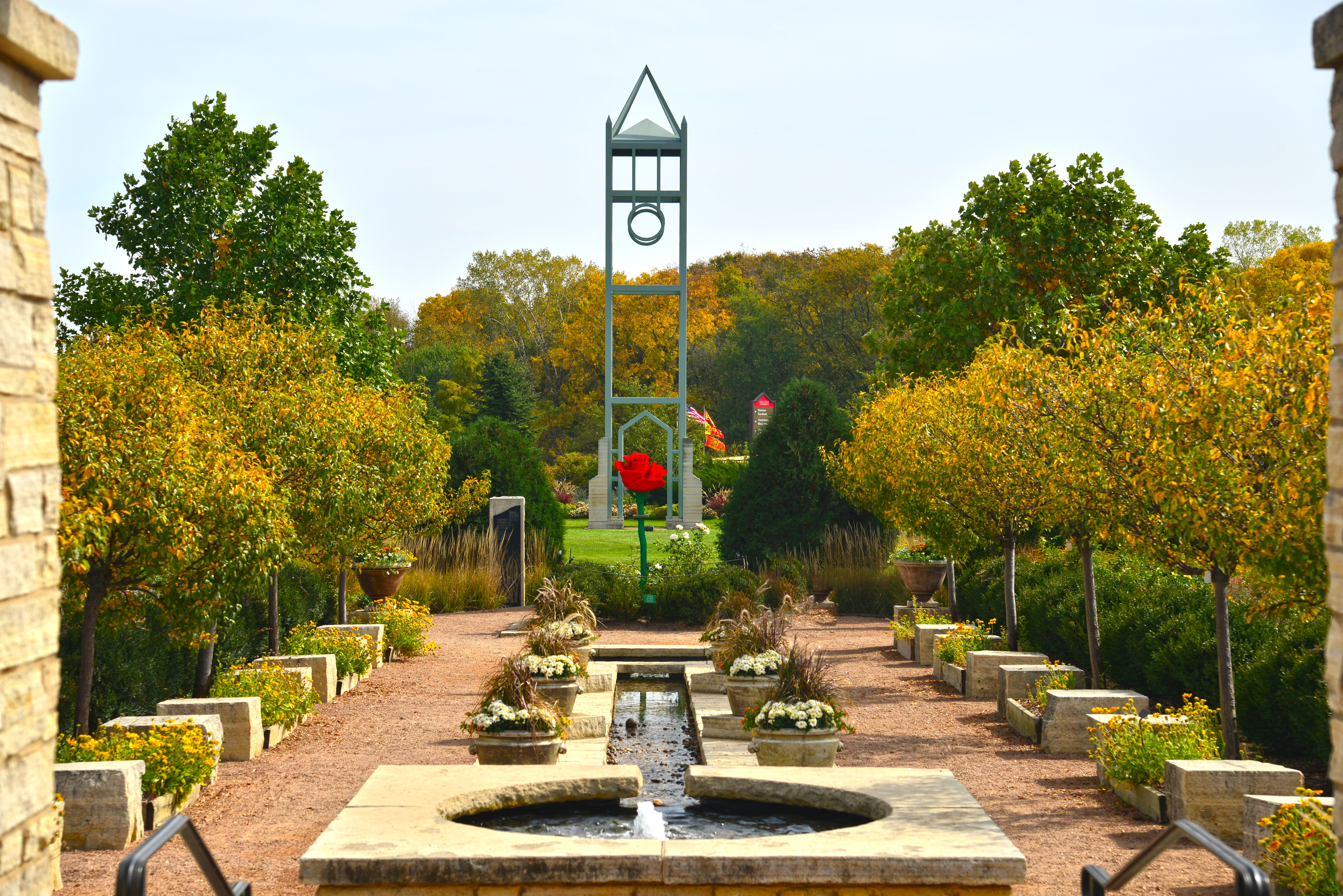
The Jones Rose Garden

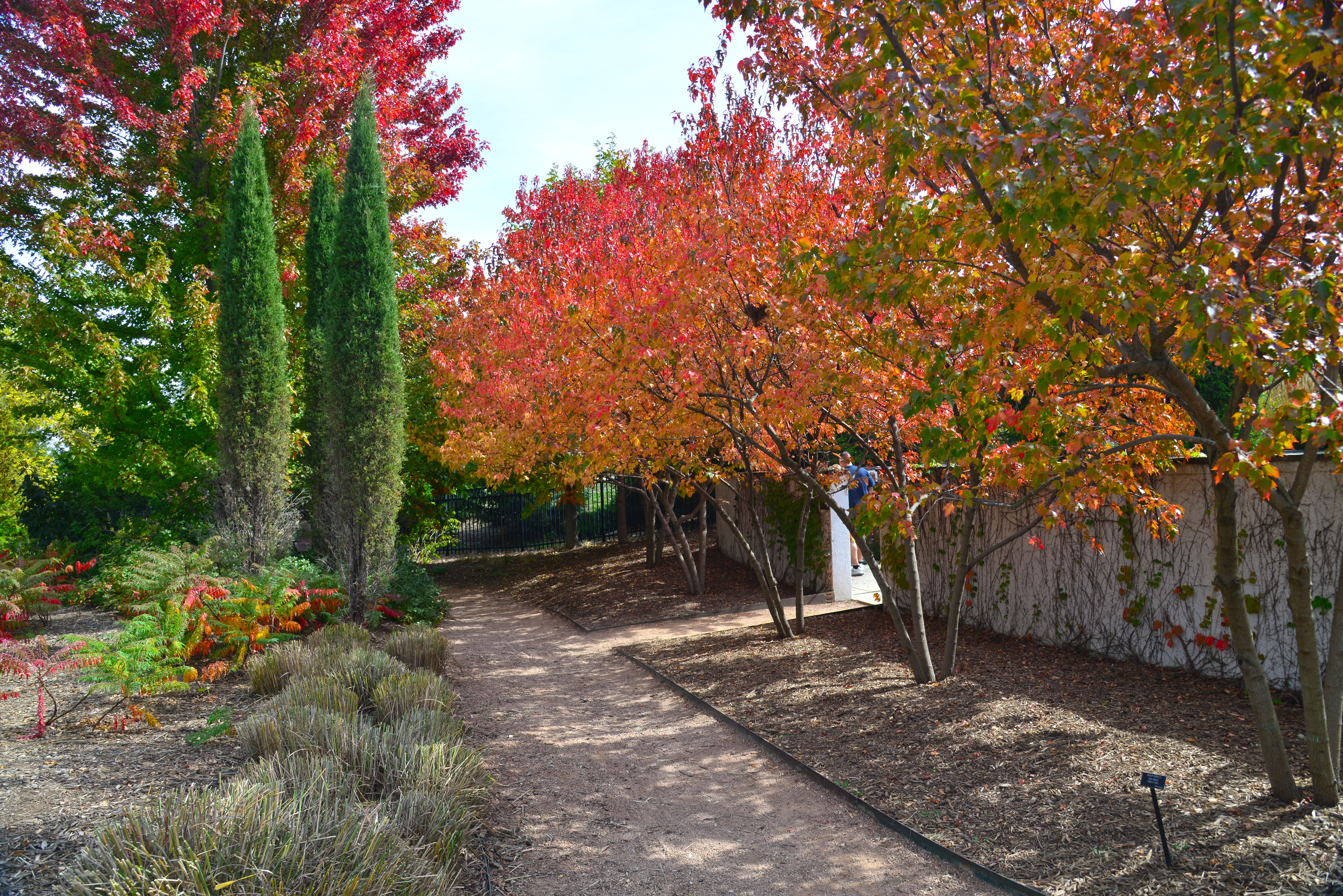
A path in between the Pattern Garden and the Naturalist Garden.

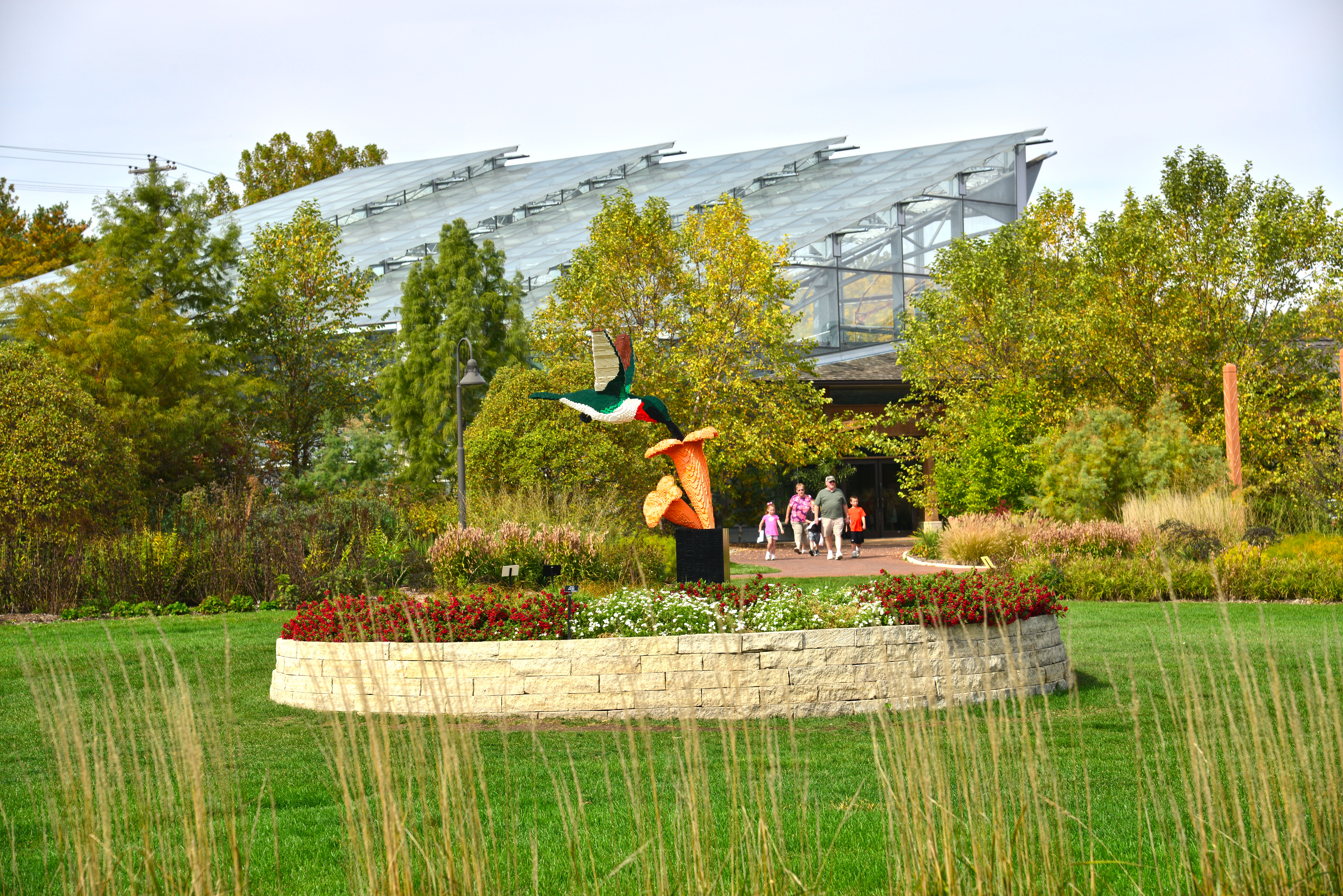
The South Field with the Hughes Conservatory in the background.

== See also ==
- List of botanical gardens in the United States
- Iowa State University
