= John Mansfield (American politician) =

American politician (1822–1896)

- Mansfield in The Land of Sunshine, July 1896

15th Lieutenant Governor of California
- In office January 8, 1880 – January 10, 1883
- Governor: George Clement Perkins
- Preceded by: James A. Johnson
- Succeeded by: John Daggett

Delegate to the Second Constitutional Convention of California
- In office September 28, 1878 – March 3, 1879
- Preceded by: Office established
- Succeeded by: Office abolished
- Constituency: 4th congressional district

Personal details
- Born: August 1822 Monroe County, New York, U.S.
- Died: May 6, 1896 (aged 73) Los Angeles, California, U.S.
- Resting place: Angelus-Rosedale Cemetery, Los Angeles, California
- Party: Republican

Military service
- Allegiance: United States
- Branch/service: United States Army; Union Army
- Years of service: 1861–1865
- Rank: Colonel, USV; Brevet Brig. General, USV
- Commands: 2nd Reg. Wis. Vol. Infantry
- Battles/wars: American Civil War; First Battle of Bull Run; Battle of Antietam; Battle of Gettysburg; Overland Campaign

John Mansfield (August 1822 – May 6, 1896) was an American lawyer and Republican politician. He was the 15th lieutenant governor of California. During the American Civil War, he was a Union Army officer serving in the 2nd Wisconsin Infantry Regiment in the famous Iron Brigade of the Army of the Potomac. He took command of the regiment during the first day of the Battle of Gettysburg and remained in command until the regiment was disbanded in the fall of 1864. After the war, he received an honorary brevet to brigadier general.

== Early life and career ==
Originally from Monroe County, New York, Mansfield emigrated to Wisconsin prior to the Civil War. During the 1850s, Mansfield practiced law in Portage, Wisconsin.

== Civil War service ==
Mansfield in uniform

Following President Lincoln's call for 75,000 state militia troops in April 1861, at the onset of the Civil War, Mansfield was commissioned as captain of Company G, 2nd Wisconsin Infantry Regiment, known as the "Portage Guards." Mustered at Camp Randall in Madison on June 11, 1861, Mansfield's regiment entered as a three-year regiment and departed Wisconsin for Washington, D.C., on June 20 to join the Army of the Potomac. At Washington, Mansfield's regiment was initially brigaded under William T. Sherman along with the 13th New York Volunteer Infantry, the 69th New York Volunteer Infantry and the 79th New York Volunteer Infantry.

Mansfield's regiment first saw action at the First Battle of Bull Run in July 1861. Mansfield and the 2nd Wisconsin went on to take part in many key battles of the war as part of the famed Iron Brigade, including South Mountain, Antietam, and Gettysburg.

=== Battle of Gettysburg ===
At Gettysburg, Mansfield had become major of the 2nd Wisconsin and was the second-highest-ranking officer left in the regiment. The 2nd Wisconsin and the Iron Brigade were part of the 1st Division of I Corps, under Brig. General James S. Wadsworth, and were at the vanguard on the march to Gettysburg.

On the first day of fighting, July 1, 1863, the 2nd Wisconsin engaged a Confederate brigade under Brig. General James J. Archer at McPherson Woods. Early in the fighting, 2nd Wisconsin soldier Private Patrick Maloney captured Archer himself, who surrendered his sword to Mansfield. Archer's surrender to Mansfield marked the first capture of a Confederate general officer since Robert E. Lee had assumed command of the Army of Northern Virginia.

Later in the first day of fighting, Major Mansfield assumed command of the 2nd Wisconsin after the senior officer, future Wisconsin governor Lucius Fairchild, was shot. Mansfield himself would be wounded later that same day and be forced to relinquish command of the regiment. Following the battle, Mansfield was appointed lieutenant colonel on July 5, 1863, and went on to serve in the Bristoe and Mine Run Campaigns before being wounded and captured in June 1864 during the Overland Campaign. Held at Libby Prison in Richmond, Mansfield was later returned to the north as part of a prisoner exchange.

Towards the end of the Civil War, Mansfield became colonel of the Veteran Reserve Corps, a reserve organization also known as the U.S. Invalid Corps, made up of men unfit for combat but able to assist in hospital work or other light duties. Mansfield was later brevetted as a brigadier general of volunteers, a rank to date from March 13, 1865.

== Lieutenant governor ==
Following the war, Mansfield settled in California and later served as a delegate to the second California constitutional convention in 1878 and 1879 and as an at-large delegate to the 1880 Republican National Convention. He was elected as California's lieutenant governor in 1879 and served one term under Republican Governor George C. Perkins from 1880 to 1883.

Mansfield died at his home in Los Angeles in 1896 and was cremated. His ashes were interred in Angelus-Rosedale Cemetery without record of their location.

Mansfield may be the namesake of Mansfield, Illinois, although other sources suggest the village was named after other unrelated men named Mansfield, or potentially the city of Mansfield, Ohio.

Military offices
Preceded by Col. Lucius Fairchild	Command of the 2nd Wisconsin Infantry Regiment; February 9, 1864 – August 14, 1864	Regiment disbanded
Political offices
Preceded by James A. Johnson	Lieutenant Governor of California; January 8, 1880 – January 10, 1883	Succeeded by John Daggett
