= Matthew Sherman =

6th Mayor of San Diego (1827–1898))

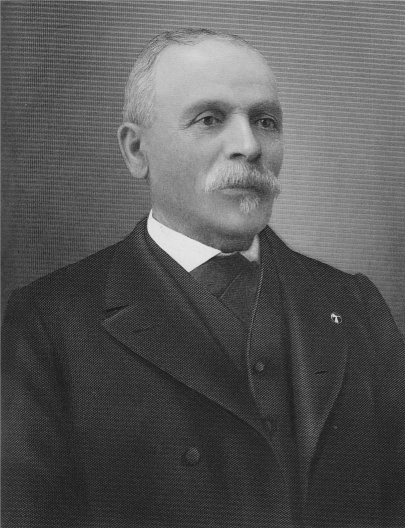

6th Mayor of San Diego
- In office May 4, 1891 – May 1, 1893
- Preceded by: Douglas Gunn
- Succeeded by: William H. Carlson

Personal details
- Born: October 31, 1827 Charlestown, Massachusetts
- Died: July 5, 1898 (aged 70) San Diego, California
- Party: Republican

Matthew Sherman (October 31, 1827 – July 5, 1898) was a land developer and American Republican politician from California.

Born in Charlestown, Massachusetts, he enlisted in the U.S. Navy at age 13 and served on the USS Columbus and the USS Independence. During the Mexican–American War, his ship briefly visited Monterey, California. During the Civil War, he served as Captain of the California Volunteers. He was at San Diego during the war and liked the city so much that he came back permanently after the war.

Sherman started out in San Diego as a Customs Collector. He married Augusta Jane Barrett on May 10, 1867. They had three children.

Sherman was a developer in San Diego and created "Sherman's Addition," or "Sherman's Heights", located just east of downtown. He bought this land in June 1867, a month after Alonzo Horton purchased land for New Town San Diego (now downtown).

He became a prominent business leader. He was interested in bringing a transcontinental railroad to San Diego, but his efforts were unsuccessful, as were later efforts with others for the San Diego and Gila Railroad. Finally, though, in 1885 the California Southern Railroad finished a line from San Bernardino to San Diego causing population and land sales to boom, earning much money for Sherman.

After the boom faded in the 1890s, Sherman became active in civic affairs, being elected to the city's Board of Trustees, and later the San Diego County Board of Supervisors. Sherman was mayor of San Diego in 1891 and 1893. He was the first mayor elected on a straight party ticket (the previous mayor was elected with two separate Republican tickets), winning by just 18 votes.

While mayor, the first Cabrillo Landing celebration was held, honoring the 350th anniversary of Juan Rodríguez Cabrillo's arrival in San Diego Bay. The boat containing "Cabrillo" was late and the tide went out in the meantime. When the Cabrillo party arrived, the crowd surged, pushing Mayor Sherman and other officials into the tidal mud.

Matthew Sherman died at age 70, in 1898, and his wife Augusta died January 5, 1913. They are interred in Mount Hope Cemetery; Augusta was the one who named the cemetery. Sherman was eulogized as a man of strong character, yet "gentle in manner and approachable. ... He was a man who had many friends and few enemies."

== See also ==
- Black, Samuel T. (1913). San Diego County California. The S. J. Clark Publishing Company, Chicago., v. 2, pp. 48–52: "Captain Matthew Sherman"; includes portrait.

Political offices
Preceded by Douglas Gunn	Mayor of San Diego; 1891–1893	Succeeded by William H. Carlson
