= David C. Reed =

American politician and 8th Mayor of San Diego

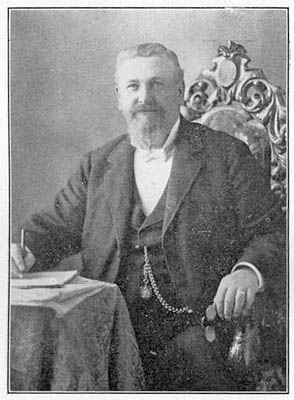
- David C. Reed (1847-1928)

8th Mayor of San Diego
- In office May 3, 1897 – May 1, 1899
- Preceded by: William H. Carlson
- Succeeded by: Edwin M. Capps

Personal details
- Born: June 16, 1847 New York City, U.S.
- Died: July 18, 1928 (aged 81) Los Angeles, California, U.S.
- Party: Republican
- Spouse: Juliet

David C. Reed (June 16, 1847 – July 18, 1928) was an American Republican politician from California.

D. C. Reed was born 1847 in New York City. In 1870, he came to San Diego where he became an attorney and real estate and insurance agent. During the boom years of 1886–1888, he was one of the five developers of Pacific Beach.

Reed was active in politics. In 1872 and 1884 he was delegate to the Republican State Convention. He canvassed the state for Ulysses S. Grant and Henry Wilson in 1872 and for Rutherford B. Hayes and William A. Wheeler in 1876. In 1879, he ran for Lieutenant Governor on the New Constitution ticket, losing to Republican John Mansfield. Reed was Alderman for San Diego in 1891, Harbor Commissioner in 1893, and Fire Commissioner in 1895.

In 1887, Reed lost the race for mayor of San Diego to William Jefferson Hunsaker. However, he later was elected mayor, and served from 1897–1899. Although a Republican, the San Diego Union, a Republican paper, refused to support Reed, although he still won. The Union gave as its reason because he was affiliated with the Municipal Ownership Club which allegedly was supported by the San Diego Flume Company. The Union supported the rival Southern California Mountain Water Company.

In 1873 Reed married Juliet Guiou, who was born July 2, 1854, and they had multiple children.

Reed was one of the officials at the 1915 Panama–California Exposition. He died in Los Angeles in 1928.

Reed Avenue in Pacific Beach is named for him.

Political offices
Preceded by William H. Carlson	Mayor of San Diego, California; 1897–1899	Succeeded by Edwin M. Capps
