= Martin D. Hamilton =

American politician and former acting Mayor of San Diego

Acting Mayor of San Diego
- In office November 13, 1888 – May 6, 1889
- Preceded by: William Jefferson Hunsaker
- Succeeded by: Douglas Gunn

Personal details
- Born: Martinez Dama; 1855 USA
- Died: 19 August 1922 (aged 66–67) San Diego
- Party: Republican

Martin Davis Hamilton (1855–1922) was an American Republican politician from San Diego, California. He served as acting mayor of San Diego following the resignation of William Jefferson Hunsaker.

== Military ==
Hamilton fought for the Union in the American Civil War, where he lost an arm. After the war, he was an active member of the Grand Army of the Republic's Heintzelman Post No. 33.

== Elected office ==
Hamilton was active in San Diego local politics and was elected to several positions over time. Hamilton was a staunch Republican and ran on the local party's "Citizen's Non-Partisan" ticket. Hamilton's first elected to office was City Assessor, where he served from 1880 until 1885.

On April 18, 1887, Hamilton was elected to the San Diego Board of Trustees. At the first meeting, the board voted to install Hamilton as president of the board. At this time the president of the board was referred to as the mayor of San Diego out of courtesy, though there was no official position of mayor at this time. The office of the mayor was reinstated in 1888, and Hamilton continued in his role as president of the board of trustees. Following the resignation of Mayor William Jefferson Hunsaker on November 13, 1888, Hamilton was elevated to acting Mayor of San Diego until the next election could be held.

Political offices
Preceded by William Jefferson Hunsaker	Mayor of San Diego, California (acting); 1888–1889	Succeeded by Douglas Gunn
