= William H. Carlson =

7th Mayor of San Diego (1864–1937)

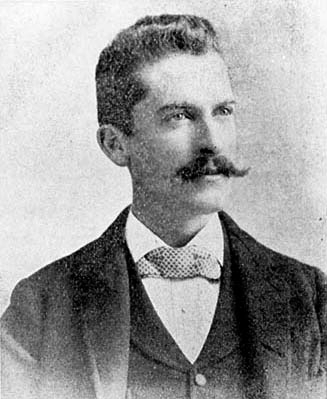
- Carlson c. late 1880s

7th Mayor of San Diego
- In office May 1, 1893 – May 3, 1897
- Preceded by: Matthew Sherman
- Succeeded by: Daniel C. Reed

Member of the California State Assembly from the 79th district
- In office January 2, 1893 – January 7, 1895
- Preceded by: John C. Lynch
- Succeeded by: Wilfred R. Guy

Personal details
- Born: April 11, 1864 Sweden
- Died: July 7, 1937 (aged 73) Los Angeles, California, U.S.
- Party: Independent
- Spouse: Carmen Ferrer (m. 1887)
- Children: 2

William H. Carlson (April 11, 1864 – July 7, 1937) was an American land developer and Independent politician from California. He served in the state legislature and served two terms as mayor of San Diego. He was the first developer of the San Diego neighborhood of Ocean Beach.

== Personal ==
Carlson was born 1864 in Sweden. He immigrated to the U.S. by 1870 and grew up in San Francisco. Carlson, a fast-talker, would later often deny he was an immigrant.

By 1885 he had moved to San Diego. On October 3, 1887 Carlson married Carmen Ferrer, of the wealthy Estudillo family.

== Ocean Beach ==
In San Diego he became editor for the San Diego Sun. Then, with San Francisco associate Frank Higgins, he opened a real estate firm, Carlson & Higgins, just when the real estate boom of 1886–88 took off. Carlson and Higgins developed Ocean Beach in 1887. They bought 600 acres (2.4 km^{2}) of pueblo land and gave it the name Ocean Beach. They laid out and named the streets, sold lots, and constructed a fancy Victorian-style hotel called the Cliff House. They sold 2,200 lots in the first few weeks. To lure buyers they promised to build a rail line to downtown, since the development was 2½ hours from downtown by carriage.

Carlson and Higgins actually did develop a short rail line from Roseville, a then-independent town on the San Diego Bay side of Point Loma, to Ocean Beach in 1888. They also attempted to build a rail line from Old Town to Roseville, but the project foundered in legal troubles after less than a mile of construction. Meanwhile San Diego's real estate boom had ended and the development was in financial trouble. The Cliff House Hotel burned down in 1898. His partner Higgins committed suicide in 1889. Carlson sold the Ocean Beach development to an Eastern financier, and its development would wait until 1909, when D. C. Collier built a permanent railroad line.

== Political career ==
Carlson became quite well known because of the failed development, and politically successful. He was first elected as a City Trustee around 1886. He ran for County Assessor in 1890 and lost. Next, he studied law and passed the bar. He was elected to the California State Assembly for the 79th district in 1892 and served from 1893 to 1895.

Then, after the legislature adjourned, he ran for mayor in March 1893 as an independent, a last-minute candidate in a five-way race. Carlson was a tall, dapper, lanky, good-natured young man with no political connections or party affiliation. He won with less than 34% of the vote. At 28, Carlson is still the youngest person ever elected mayor in San Diego.

He was elected and reelected on the promise to provide all sorts of civic improvements, although he did not deliver all or most of what he promised. His biggest promise, ultimately unfulfilled, was to build a railroad east of San Diego. Reportedly many people voted for him "just to see what he would do."

Carlson served as mayor of San Diego during 1893–1896. He pledged to remove unneeded city jobs, but the council resisted, setting a pattern of conflict for the rest of the term. Many of Carlson's public works projects were rejected by the council.

Carlson also raised funds for a railroad to Arizona. He raised funds from thousands, but only had enough to lay 10 miles (16 km) of track. Not until John D. Spreckels' San Diego and Arizona Eastern Railway was this plan realized 25 years later.

Towards the end of his Mayoral term, Carlson ran unsuccessfully for Congress, promising a new post office in every town. Sure he would win, he had his friend David C. Reed run for mayor, but after he lost the race for Congress, he kept his name on the mayoral ballot. However, Carlson lost and his friend Reed won in a 3-way race. After losing, Carlson staged his own mock political funeral.

Carlson's successes as mayor include obtaining federal funds for a jetty at the entrance to San Diego Bay, first interesting the Navy in San Diego, obtaining state funds for a Normal School (later San Diego State University), and getting a Mexican right-of-way for a railroad to Yuma, mentioned earlier, which Spreckels would later exploit.

== Real estate scams ==
After his defeat, Carlson left town for several real estate and railroad schemes in Los Angeles, Alaska, and Cuba.

In 1917 Carlson was caught in a scheme where he sold desert land multiple times to different people and was convicted of mail fraud. He served half of his sentenced time in federal prison, gaining an early release in 1920.

Carlson died 1937 in Los Angeles while in the middle of another shady real estate deal.

== Quote ==
"A man is honest as long as he intends to be honest."

== See also ==
- Biography by Robert W. Bogue (San Diego Histlorical Society)
- "Political Affairs and Municipal Campaigns" (part 5, chapter 2), History of San Diego (1907-09) by Smythe

Political offices
Preceded by Matthew Sherman	Mayor of San Diego, California; 1893–1897	Succeeded by Daniel C. Reed
