= William Jefferson Hunsaker =

American lawyer and 4th Mayor of San Diego (1855–1933)

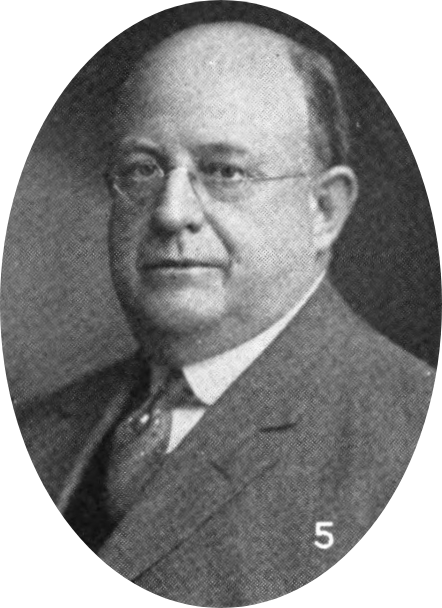
- Hunsaker c. 1913–1914

4th Mayor of San Diego
- In office January 3, 1888 – November 13, 1888
- Preceded by: George P. Tebbetts
- Succeeded by: Martin D. Hamilton (acting)

Personal details
- Born: September 21, 1855 Contra Costa County, California, U.S.
- Died: January 13, 1933 (aged 77) Los Angeles, California, U.S.
- Party: Workingmen's (before 1896); Republican (after 1896)
- Spouse: Florence Virginia McFarland
- Children: 5
- Parent: Nicholas Hunsaker (father)

William Jefferson Hunsaker (1855–1933) was an American lawyer and politician from San Diego and later Los Angeles, California. Hunsaker was the San Diego County District Attorney from 1882 to 1884, 4th mayor of San Diego from 1887 to 1888 and president of the California Bar Association from 1913 to 1914.

== Early life and career ==
William Hunsaker was born 21 September 1855 in Contra Costa County, California to Nicholas and Lois E. (Hastings) Hunsaker. Nicholas Hunziker settled in California in 1847 and was sheriff of Contra Costa County from 1851 to 1853 and from 1855 to 1857. Lois's uncle was Lansford W. Hastings, author of "Emigrant's Guide To Oregon and California", captain in Frémont's California Battalion, and participant in California's constitutional convention. Nicholas Hunsaker moved his family to San Diego in 1869, where he served as the 10th sheriff of San Diego County from 1875 to 1876.

At 16 years of age, William Hunsaker began to learn the printer's trade, starting as a printer's devil on the San Diego Bulletin, then working as a journeyman printer on the Bulletin and the World for two and a half years. Hunsaker next trained as a lawyer with Major Levi Chase and Albert C. Baker and was admitted to practice law in 1876. On 27 February 1879, Hunsaker married Florence McFarland in San Diego and the couple moved to Tombstone, Arizona. In 1881, Hunsaker assisted his law partner, Thomas Fitch, in defending Wyatt Earp from murder charges resulting from the gunfight at the O.K. Corral. When Earp died in 1929, Hunsaker was one of the pall-bearers at Earp's funeral.

== Elected office ==
Hunsaker's first elected office was San Diego District Attorney, from 1882 to 1884. After being nominated, Hunsaker ran an aggressive campaign touring most of San Diego County. At the time, this included all of what are now San Diego County and Imperial County, as well as most of Riverside County and parts of San Bernardino County.

In 1887, Hunsaker ran for the newly reestablished office of mayor of San Diego, after 35 years of the formerly-bankrupt city being run by a board of trustees. Hunsaker ran as the candidate of the Workingman's Party. The party's platform supported the interests of laborers, arguing for a larger share of wealth for laborers, promoting businesses to hire native-born workers rather than the primarily Chinese foreign-born workers. Hunsaker was elected to a two-year term, defeating his opponent D. C. Reed of the Citizens party by 1041 votes to 867. He was sworn in on January 3, 1888.

Although Hunsaker won his election, the city council was dominated by members of the Citizen's Party. Hunsaker felt that he lost a power struggle with the rest of the council, and resigned from office on November 13, 1888, after a period of poor attendance at council meetings. After stepping down from office, Hunsaker resumed work in the field of law.

== Later career ==
In 1889, William Hunsaker unsuccessfully defended the killer of the Oceanside marshal in a well-publicized case. In June 1892, the Hunsakers moved to Los Angeles. From 1893 to 1896, Hunsaker was counsel for the Atchison, Topeka and Santa Fe Railway, but apparently maintained an outside practice as well, defending E. S. Babcock from bribery charges related to the Southern California Mountain Water Company. Upon leaving the AT&SF, Hunsaker entered private practice, eventually re-joining with Eugene W. Britt, Hunsaker's partner when located in San Diego. Disenchanted with the Democratic Party's support for free silver, Hunsaker switched political affiliation to the Republican Party in 1896, supporting the McKinley campaign. However Hunsaker remained largely independent — from 1896 to 1906, he chaired the Committee of One Hundred, a group of leading citizens who published non-partisan ballots for local elections.

In 1901, Hunsaker was elected to be "junior vice-president" of the Los Angeles Bar Association and appointed as a delegate to the 1901 American Bar Association convention to be held in Denver. In 1904, William J. Hunsaker was present at the American Bar Association annual meeting in St. Louis as vice-president of, and delegate appointed by, the California State Bar Association and was elected to be a vice president of the ABA. Later in 1904, Hunsaker was elected to be president of the Los Angeles County Bar Association. During this period, Hunsaker defended major California newspapers from several sensational libel and commercial lawsuits. In 1908, Hunsaker was president of the Los Angeles City Charter Revision Committee and the Los Angeles City Club, and a leading candidate to fill the California Supreme Court position vacated by the death of Thomas B. McFarland. In 1911, Hunsaker was elected vice president of the California Bar Association, and in 1913, was elected Association president, 1913–1914. Hunsaker was a life member of the Native Sons of the Golden West.

== Personal life ==
Will and Florence had five children: Mary Cameron (William Brill), twins Florence King and Lois, Rose Margaret (John Hamilton Lashbrooke, William Adam Steehler, Marshall Macy Hobson), and Daniel McFarland (Katherine Lyons). Lois Hunsaker died at age 9 months in November 1882. Florence pre-deceased her husband, Will, passing on 24 Nov 1928. Will Hunsaker died at his Los Angeles home on 13 Jan 1933 and is buried in the Hollywood Forever Cemetery, Los Angeles County.

Political offices
Preceded by George P. Tebbetts	Mayor of San Diego, California; 1888	Succeeded by Martin D. Hamilton (acting)
