= Mount Carmel High School (Mount Carmel, Illinois) =

Mt. Carmel High School

Location
- 201 N Pear St. Mt. Carmel, Illinois 62863; United States

Information
- Type: Public high school
- School district: Wabash Community Unit School District 348
- Principal: Andrew Shelby
- Teaching staff: 30.10 (FTE)
- Grades: 9-12
- Enrollment: 448 (2023-2024)
- Student to teacher ratio: 14.88
- Color
- Athletics conference: Little Illini since 2021
- Team name: Golden Aces
- Website: Mt. Carmel High School

Mount Carmel High School is a public high school in Mt. Carmel, Illinois. It is a part of Wabash Community Unit School District 348. It is the only high school in Wabash County, Illinois, which is in southern Illinois, just across the Wabash River from Gibson and Knox Counties of Indiana.

The district (of which this is the sole comprehensive high school) includes the vast majority of the county, and has Mount Carmel, Bellmont, and Keensburg. Allendale students, within Allendale Community Consolidated School District 17 (PK-8), move on to Mount Carmel High. Other towns that send students to MCHS include Patton and Friendsville. Enrollment is also possible for residents of Cowling, although their students are usually sent to the nearby school in Grayville.

== Athletics ==
=== Teams ===
Mt. Carmel's athletic teams are nicknamed the Golden Aces and the school's colors are maroon and gold. The school received the nickname during the 1915-1916 basketball season. Before then, the school's athletic teams were called the Maroon & Gold. The boys' basketball team participated in a tournament in the Wood River area and won the tournament championship. A sportswriter for the area said that the team played like "Five Golden Aces." The players and students like it and teams have competed as the Golden Aces ever since.

The Aces have been competing in the Little Illini Conference since 2021, after departing the Indiana based Big Eight Conference which has since folded. In the years between leaving the Big Eight Conference and joining the Little Illini Conference, Mount Carmel competed as an independent school following the disbanding of the North Egypt Conference. Mount Carmel competes in the following sports in the Little Illini Conference:

- Boys Basketball
- Girls Basketball
- Football
- Softball
- Baseball
- Volleyball
- Wrestling
- Boys Tract
- Girls Track
- Cross Country
- Boys Golf
- Girls Golf
- Boys Tennis
- Girls Tennis
- Boys Soccer
- Girls Soccer
- Marching Band

=== State championships ===
Basketball

- 1927 State Champions

Football

- 1981 3A State Champions

Boys Golf

- 2010 1A State Champions

Girls Golf

- 2021 1A State Champions
- 2022 1A State Champions
- 2023 1A State Champions

Wrestling

- 2011 1A Tanner Crum Heavyweight State Champion
- 2016 1A Andrew Wise 220 State Champion

== Notable alumni ==
- Gil Mains, NFL player
- Luke Drone, football player

== See also ==
- Wabash Valley College
