= 2008 United States presidential election in Illinois =

- November 4, 2008
- Turnout: 71.6% (▲0.26 pp)

Nominee	Barack Obama	John McCain
Party	Democratic	Republican
Home state	Illinois	Arizona
Running mate	Joe Biden	Sarah Palin
Electoral vote	21	0
Popular vote	3,419,348	2,031,179
Percentage	61.92%	36.78%

Obama
40–50%
50–60%
60–70%
70–80%
80–90%
McCain
40–50%
50–60%
60–70%
President before election
George W. Bush
Republican
Elected President
Barack Obama
Democratic

The 2008 United States presidential election in Illinois took place on November 4, 2008, and was part of the 2008 United States presidential election. Voters chose 21 representatives, or electors, to the Electoral College, who voted for president and vice president.

Democratic nominee Barack Obama won his home state by a 25.1 percentage point margin over Republican nominee John McCain. Prior to the election, every major news organization considered Illinois a state Obama would win, or otherwise a safe blue state. One of the most reliably blue states in the nation, Illinois has not voted for a Republican presidential nominee since 1988, when George H. W. Bush narrowly carried the state. In 2008, continuing that trend, it appeared that a generic Democratic presidential nominee could have easily won Illinois; it was no surprise then that Obama, who represented Illinois in the U.S. Senate, won the state in a landslide victory, clinching near 62 percent of the total vote.

As of the 2024 presidential election, this is the last time a Democrat won the following counties: Boone, Bureau, Cass, Calhoun, Coles, Gallatin, Grundy, Kankakee, LaSalle, Macon, Macoupin, Madison, Mason, McDonough, McHenry, Montgomery, Pulaski, Sangamon, Schuyler, Stephenson, and Vermillion. McLean County, the home of Bloomington, would not vote for a Democrat again until 2020.

As of 2024, Obama in 2008 is the only presidential candidate of either major party to win the state with more than 60% of the vote since Warren G. Harding in 1920, and the only Democrat to do so since Andrew Jackson, the Democratic Party's first presidential nominee, in 1828 and 1832. McCain's 36.78% of the vote is the second-lowest of any major-party nominee since 1924, only surpassing George H. W. Bush in 1992, when a substantial amount of the vote went to Ross Perot’s candidacy as an independent.

Illinois was one of three states where Obama outperformed Franklin D. Roosevelt in all four of his runs, as well as Lyndon Johnson in his 1964 landslide. The others were rapidly Democratic-trending Vermont and Delaware, the latter being the home state of Joe Biden, Obama's running mate. This would be the last election in which the margin in Cook County was not the deciding factor in a statewide victory. Obama's victory in Illinois is the largest ever for a Democrat since the Republican Party became a major party.

== Primaries ==
=== Turnout ===
For the state-run primaries (Democratic, Republican, and Green), turnout was 40.26%, with 2,940,708 votes cast. For the general election, turnout was 70.90%, with 5,522,371 votes cast.

State-run primaries were held for both major parties, as well as the Green Party, on February 5.

=== Democratic ===
The 2008 Illinois Democratic presidential primary took place on Super Tuesday, February 5, 2008, with 153 delegates at stake. The winner in each of Illinois's 19 congressional districts was awarded all of that district's delegates, totaling 100. Another 53 delegates were awarded to the statewide winner, Barack Obama. The 153 delegates represented Illinois at the Democratic National Convention in Denver, Colorado. Thirty-two other unpledged delegates, known as superdelegates, also attended the convention and cast their votes as well.

==== Polls ====
Polls indicated that then-U.S. Senator Barack Obama was leading then-U.S. Senator Hillary Clinton by double digits in the days before the contest in his home state of Illinois.

==== Results ====
2008 Illinois Democratic presidential primary results
Party	Candidate	Votes	Percentage	Delegates
Democratic	Barack Obama	1,318,234	64.66%	104
Democratic	Hillary Clinton	667,930	32.76%	49
Democratic	John Edwards	39,719	1.95%	0
Democratic	Dennis Kucinich	4,234	0.21%	0
Democratic	Joe Biden	3,788	0.19%	0
Democratic	Bill Richardson	3,538	0.17%	0
Democratic	Christopher Dodd	1,171	0.06%	0
Totals		2,038,614	100.00%	153
Voter turnout		%		—

Chicago Public Radio reported on March 13, 2008, that the delegate counts had been recalculated and Obama won 106 delegates to 47 for Clinton.

During the state by state roll call at the Democratic National Convention, the Illinois delegation declined to cast their votes.

==== Analysis ====
It was no surprise that Barack Obama cruised to a landslide victory in Illinois, the state he had represented in the U.S. Senate since 2005. He enjoyed massive support in his state among all demographics. According to exit polls, 57% of voters in the Illinois Democratic Primary were white and they opted for Obama 57–41; 24% of voters were African American and they, too, backed Obama 93–5; and 17 percent of voters in the primary were Hispanic/Latino and they narrowly backed Obama 50–49. Obama won all age groups but tied Clinton among senior citizens aged 65 and over. He won all voters in the state of all educational attainment levels as well as income/socioeconomic classes. He won all ideological groups and voters from both parties as well as self-identified Independents. Regarding religion, Obama won every major denomination except Roman Catholics, who narrowly backed Clinton 50-48%. Obama won Protestants by a margin of 58–38, other Christians 79–19, other religions 82–17, and atheists/agnostics 78–21.

Obama performed extremely well statewide and racked up massive victories in his home city of Chicago as well as its suburbs and the metropolitan area. He also won Northern Illinois as well as the collar counties by substantial victories. Clinton's best performance was in Southern Illinois among the more rural and conservative counties that are majority white, although Obama still won the region as a whole.

=== Republican ===
The 2008 Illinois Republican presidential primary was held on February 5, 2008, in the U.S. state of Illinois as one of the Republican Party's state primaries ahead of the 2008 presidential election. Illinois was one of 24 States holding a primary or caucus on Super Tuesday. Delegates from each of Illinois' 19 congressional districts are selected by direct election. In addition, the primary ballot also contains a preference poll that lists the presidential candidates.

2008 Illinois Republican presidential primary
Candidate	Votes	Percentage	Delegates
John McCain	426,777	47.45%	54
Mitt Romney	257,265	28.60%	3
Mike Huckabee	148,053	16.46%	0
Ron Paul	45,055	5.01%	0
Rudy Giuliani*	11,837	1.32%	0
Fred Thompson*	7,259	0.81%	0
Alan Keyes	2,318	0.26%	0
Jim Mitchell, Jr.	483	0.05%	0
Tom Tancredo*	375	0.04%	0
Total	899,422	100%	57

*Candidate withdrew prior to the primary.

=== Green ===
2008 Illinois Green Party presidential primary
- February 5, 2008

44 Green National Convention delegates
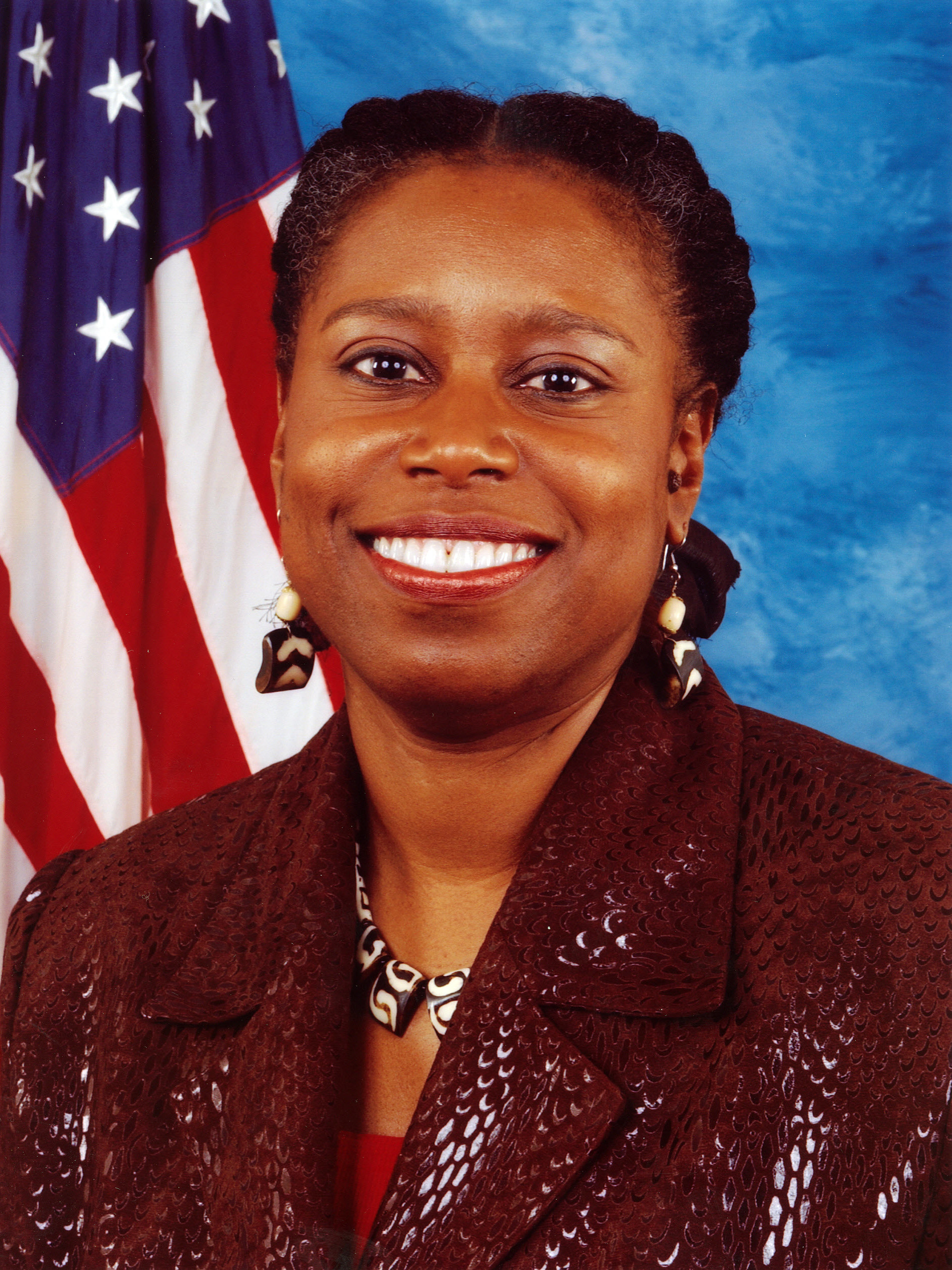

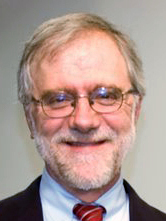

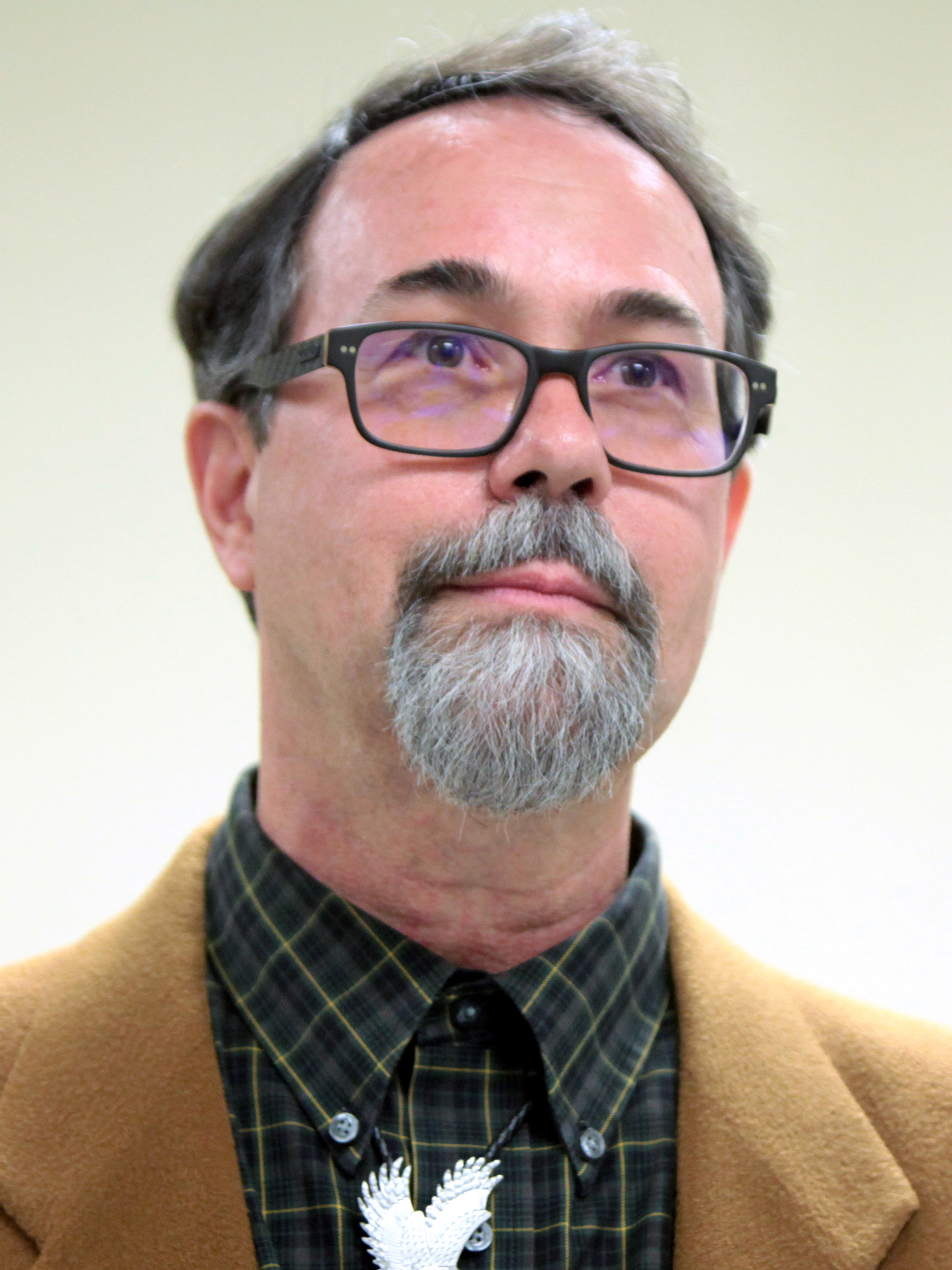

Candidate	Cynthia McKinney	Howie Hawkins
Party	Green	Green
Home state	Georgia	New York
Delegate count	25	8
Popular vote	1,513	464
Percentage	56.62%	17.37%
Candidate	Kent Mesplay	Jared A. Ball
Party	Green	Green
Home state	California
Delegate count	6	5
Popular vote	384	311
Percentage	14.37%	11.64%

The 2008 Illinois Green Party presidential primary was held on February 5, 2008, in the U.S. state of Illinois as one of the Green Party's state primaries ahead of the 2008 presidential election.

By virtue of Green Party candidate Rich Whitney's performance in the 2006 Illinois gubernatorial election, the party had earned the right to have a state-run primary in 2008.

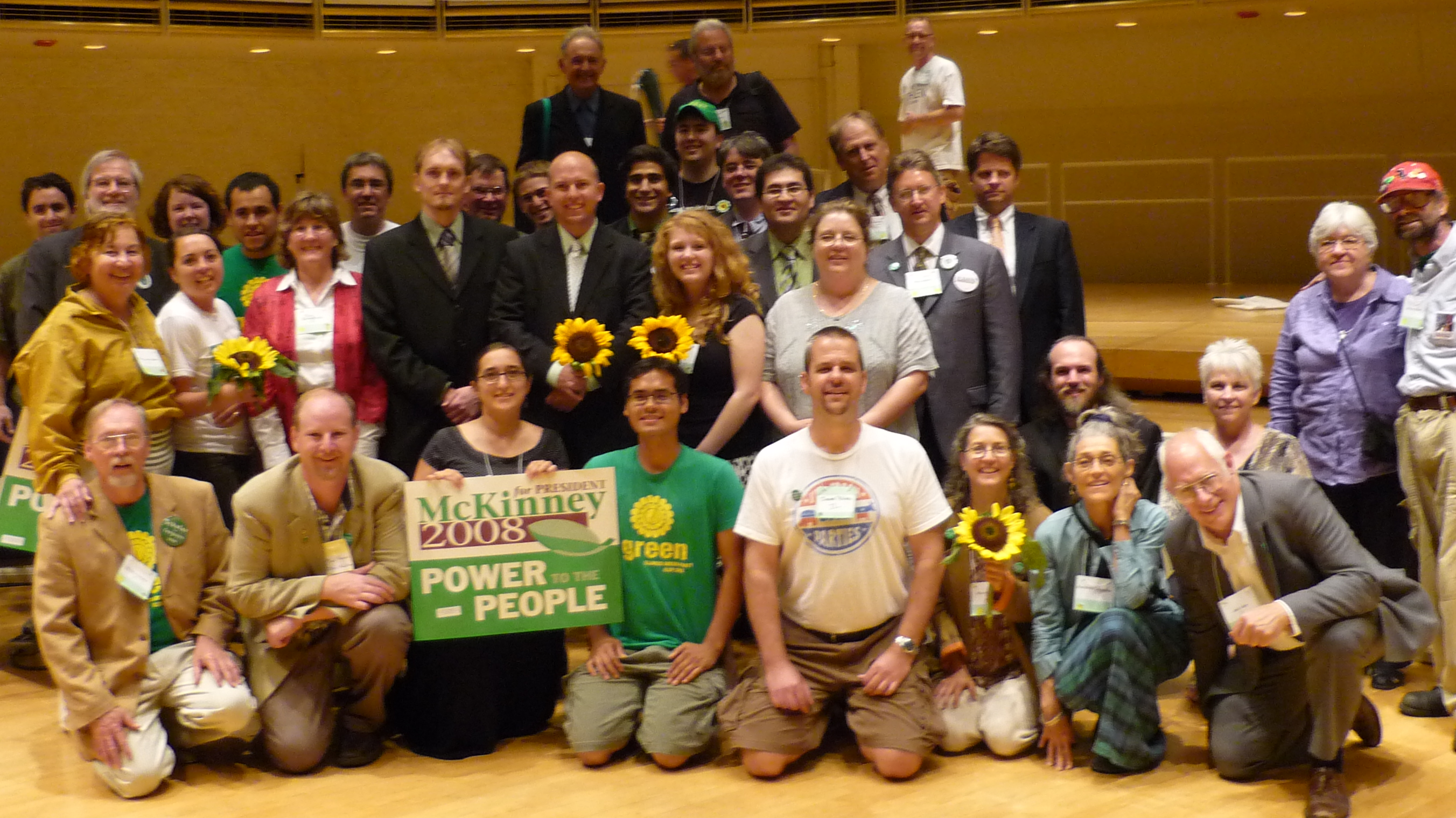
Illinois delegation at the 2008 Green Party National Convention

Illinois Green Party presidential primary, February 5, 2008
Candidate	Votes	Percentage	National delegates
Cynthia McKinney	1,513	56.62%	25
Howie Hawkins	464	17.37%	8
Kent Mesplay	384	14.37%	6
Jared A. Ball	311	11.64%	5
Total	2,672	100%	44

== Campaign ==
=== Predictions ===
There were 16 news organizations who made state-by-state predictions of the election. Here are their last predictions before election day:

Source	Ranking
D.C. Political Report	Likely D
Cook Political Report	Solid D
The Takeaway	Solid D
Electoral-vote.com	Solid D
Washington Post	Solid D
Politico	Solid D
RealClearPolitics	Solid D
FiveThirtyEight	Solid D
CQ Politics	Solid D
The New York Times	Solid D
CNN	Safe D
NPR	Solid D
MSNBC	Solid D
Fox News	Likely D
Associated Press	Likely D
Rasmussen Reports	Safe D

=== Polling ===
Obama won every single pre-election poll, and each by a double-digit margin and with at least 52% (with the exception of an ARG poll). The final 3 polls averaged Obama leading 60% to 35%.

=== Fundraising ===
Obama raised $35,307,625. McCain raised $7,207,428.

=== Advertising and visits ===
Obama spent $23,319. McCain and interest groups spent $52,865. The Democratic ticket visited the state 13 times. McCain's ticket visited the state twice.

== Analysis ==
For most of the second half of the 20th century, Illinois was reckoned as a Republican-leaning swing state. It voted Republican in every election from 1952 to 1988, save for 1960 and 1964. However, George H. W. Bush just barely won the state in 1988, and it swung heavily to Bill Clinton and the Democrats in 1992. Since then, Democrats have won the state by fairly comfortable margins, and it is now reckoned as the most solidly Democratic state in the Midwest.

The Democratic trend in Illinois can be largely attributed to Cook County, home to Chicago, which makes up about 41.2% of the state's total population. While Chicago has been a Democratic stronghold for decades, the suburban areas of Cook County have historically tilted Republican. However, the brand of Republicanism in the suburbs has historically been moderate, and these areas swung Democratic as the national party moved more to the right. Democrats also do very well in the Illinois portions of the Quad Cities and St. Louis areas. Additionally, the historically Republican collar counties near Chicago – DuPage, Lake, McHenry, Kane, and Will – have become friendlier to Democrats at the national level.

Barack Obama, the junior U.S. senator from Illinois at the time of the election, carried the state handily, defeating John McCain of Arizona by a margin of 1.38 million votes. Obama carried his home county, Cook County, with roughly 76% of the vote, the highest percentage of any Democratic presidential candidate since its incorporation in 1831. He also swept all five collar counties, becoming the first Democratic candidate since Franklin Pierce in 1852 to do so, with DuPage, Kendall, Lake, and Will giving him double-digit margins. Notably, DuPage, Kane, Kendall, and McHenry had not supported a Democrat for president since that election. McLean County voted Democratic for the first time since 1964. Obama improved on Kerry's performance enough that he would have prevailed in the state even if the Democratic stronghold of Cook County had its votes excluded, albeit by a narrower margin of 1,790,324 votes to McCain's 1,543,443 or 53.7% - 46.3% of the two-party vote. This is the only time in the 21st century that the Democratic candidate has done so.

Obama also did very well in several rural counties that had historically voted Republican. He became the first Democrat to win Carroll County since that county was created in 1839, in the process breaking the last remaining Republican streak stretching from initial GOP candidate John C. Frémont in 1856, and the first Democrat to win Boone County since James K. Polk in 1844. McCain did, however, win several of the more rural counties in Southern Illinois; Obama thus became the first-ever Democrat to win the White House without carrying Christian County. It was not nearly enough, however, to put a serious dent in Obama's 25-point margin in the state. As of the 2024 presidential election, this is the last presidential election that a Democrat won all of Chicago's collar counties.

During the same election, senior U.S. Senator and Senate Majority Whip Dick Durbin, a Democrat, was reelected to the U.S. Senate with 67.84% of the vote over Republican Dr. Steve Sauerberg who received 28.53%. At the state level, Democrats picked up three seats in the Illinois House of Representatives.

== Results ==
2008 United States presidential election in Illinois
Party	Candidate	Running mate	Votes	Percentage	Electoral votes
Democratic	Barack Obama	Joe Biden	3,419,348	61.92%	21
Republican	John McCain	Sarah Palin	2,031,179	36.78%	0
Independent	Ralph Nader	Matt Gonzalez	31,152	0.56%	0
Libertarian	Bob Barr	Wayne Allyn Root	19,642	0.36%	0
Green	Cynthia McKinney	Rosa Clemente	11,838	0.21%	0
Constitution	Chuck Baldwin	Darrell Castle	8,256	0.15%	0
New Party	John Joseph Polachek		1,149	0.02%	0
Write-Ins	Write-ins		11	0.00%	0
Totals			5,522,371	100.00%	21
Voter turnout					58.1%

=== By county ===
County	Barack Obama Democratic		John McCain Republican		Various candidates Other parties		Margin		Total votes cast
County	#	%	#	%	#	%	#	%	Total votes cast
Adams	11,794	38.17%	18,711	60.55%	397	1.29%	-6,917	-22.38%	30,902
Alexander	2,189	55.46%	1,692	42.87%	66	1.67%	497	12.59%	3,947
Bond	3,843	48.28%	3,947	49.59%	170	2.58%	-104	-1.31%	7,960
Boone	11,333	50.96%	10,403	46.78%	502	2.25%	930	4.18%	22,238
Brown	986	38.26%	1,544	59.91%	47	1.82%	-558	-21.65%	2,577
Bureau	8,889	51.82%	7,911	46.12%	353	2.05%	978	5.70%	17,153
Calhoun	1,423	52.59%	1,221	45.12%	62	2.29%	202	7.47%	2,706
Carroll	3,965	51.54%	3,596	46.74%	132	1.72%	369	4.80%	7,693
Cass	2,690	49.52%	2,617	48.18%	125	2.31%	73	1.34%	5,432
Champaign	48,597	57.57%	33,871	40.13%	1,940	2.29%	14,726	17.44%	84,408
Christian	6,918	45.65%	7,872	51.94%	365	2.41%	-954	-6.29%	15,155
Clark	3,742	45.02%	4,409	53.04%	161	1.94%	-667	-8.02%	8,312
Clay	2,425	37.50%	3,926	60.72%	115	1.79%	-1,501	-23.22%	6,466
Clinton	7,657	44.22%	9,357	54.04%	300	1.74%	-1,700	-9.82%	17,314
Coles	11,716	50.60%	10,978	47.42%	459	1.98%	738	3.18%	23,153
Cook	1,629,024	76.21%	487,736	22.82%	20,706	0.97%	1,141,288	53.39%	2,137,466
Crawford	3,883	42.42%	5,070	55.39%	200	2.19%	-1,187	-12.97%	9,153
Cumberland	2,055	38.49%	3,156	59.11%	128	2.40%	-1,101	-20.62%	5,339
DeKalb	25,784	57.33%	18,266	40.61%	924	2.05%	7,518	16.72%	44,974
DeWitt	3,308	42.24%	4,348	55.52%	175	2.23%	-1,040	-13.28%	7,831
Douglas	3,228	38.52%	5,005	59.73%	146	1.74%	-1,777	-21.21%	8,379
DuPage	228,698	54.72%	183,626	43.93%	5,649	1.35%	45,072	10.79%	417,973
Edgar	3,743	45.18%	4,398	53.09%	143	1.73%	-655	-7.91%	8,284
Edwards	1,140	33.91%	2,137	63.56%	85	2.53%	-997	-29.65%	3,362
Effingham	5,262	31.17%	11,323	67.08%	295	1.75%	-6,061	-35.91%	16,880
Fayette	3,967	40.86%	5,499	56.64%	242	2.49%	-1,532	-15.78%	9,708
Ford	2,227	34.80%	4,079	63.73%	94	1.47%	-1,852	-28.93%	6,400
Franklin	8,880	47.45%	9,404	50.25%	430	2.30%	-524	-2.80%	18,714
Fulton	9,732	59.45%	6,251	38.19%	386	2.36%	3,481	21.26%	16,369
Gallatin	1,587	55.26%	1,212	42.20%	73	2.54%	375	13.06%	2,872
Greene	2,619	44.95%	3,053	52.40%	154	2.64%	-434	-7.45%	5,826
Grundy	11,063	49.76%	10,687	48.07%	482	2.17%	376	1.69%	22,232
Hamilton	1,796	41.92%	2,353	54.93%	135	3.15%	-557	-13.01%	4,284
Hancock	4,141	43.73%	5,161	54.50%	167	1.76%	-1,020	-10.77%	9,469
Hardin	892	39.43%	1,330	58.80%	40	1.77%	-438	-19.37%	2,262
Henderson	2,215	57.85%	1,541	40.25%	73	1.91%	674	17.60%	3,829
Henry	13,181	53.04%	11,263	45.33%	405	1.63%	1,918	7.71%	24,849
Iroquois	4,643	34.08%	8,695	63.82%	286	2.10%	-4,052	-29.74%	13,624
Jackson	15,248	59.52%	9,687	37.81%	682	2.66%	5,561	21.71%	25,617
Jasper	2,063	40.12%	2,964	57.64%	115	2.24%	-901	-17.52%	5,142
Jefferson	7,462	43.33%	9,302	54.02%	457	2.65%	-1,840	-10.69%	17,221
Jersey	5,042	47.50%	5,329	50.20%	244	2.30%	-287	-2.70%	10,615
Jo Daviess	6,403	54.49%	5,170	44.00%	177	1.51%	1,233	10.49%	11,750
Johnson	1,871	31.64%	3,912	66.15%	131	2.22%	-2,041	-34.51%	5,914
Kane	106,756	55.21%	83,963	43.42%	2,644	1.37%	22,793	11.79%	193,363
Kankakee	24,750	51.41%	22,527	46.80%	861	1.79%	2,223	4.61%	48,138
Kendall	24,742	52.95%	21,380	45.75%	609	1.30%	3,362	7.20%	46,731
Knox	14,191	58.89%	9,419	39.09%	488	2.03%	4,772	19.80%	24,098
Lake	177,242	59.10%	118,545	39.53%	4,113	1.37%	58,697	19.57%	299,900
LaSalle	27,443	54.55%	21,872	43.47%	995	1.98%	5,571	11.08%	50,310
Lawrence	3,016	45.99%	3,403	51.89%	139	2.12%	-387	-5.90%	6,558
Lee	7,765	47.47%	8,258	50.49%	334	2.04%	-493	-3.02%	16,357
Livingston	6,189	39.50%	9,191	58.66%	289	1.84%	-3,002	-19.16%	15,669
Logan	5,250	40.57%	7,429	57.41%	262	2.02%	-2,179	-16.84%	12,941
Macon	25,487	49.60%	24,948	48.55%	954	1.86%	539	1.05%	51,389
Macoupin	12,090	53.87%	9,891	44.07%	462	2.06%	2,199	9.80%	22,443
Madison	68,979	53.60%	57,177	44.43%	2,534	1.97%	11,802	9.17%	128,690
Marion	8,345	47.93%	8,691	49.92%	374	2.15%	-346	-1.99%	17,410
Marshall	3,081	48.53%	3,145	49.54%	122	1.92%	-64	-1.01%	6,348
Mason	3,542	51.85%	3,141	45.98%	148	2.17%	401	5.87%	6,831
Massac	2,693	37.36%	4,371	60.63%	145	2.01%	-1,678	-23.27%	7,209
McDonough	6,783	51.89%	6,055	46.32%	234	1.79%	728	5.57%	13,072
McHenry	72,288	51.77%	64,845	46.44%	2,499	1.79%	7,443	5.33%	139,632
McLean	37,689	49.67%	36,767	48.46%	1,422	1.87%	922	1.21%	75,878
Menard	2,706	41.78%	3,672	56.69%	99	1.53%	-966	-14.91%	6,477
Mercer	4,887	55.10%	3,833	43.21%	150	1.69%	1,054	11.89%	8,870
Monroe	7,953	43.87%	9,881	54.50%	295	1.63%	-1,928	-10.63%	18,129
Montgomery	6,491	50.28%	6,150	47.64%	268	2.08%	341	2.64%	12,909
Morgan	7,467	48.51%	7,591	49.31%	336	2.18%	-124	-0.80%	15,394
Moultrie	2,668	42.53%	3,471	55.33%	134	2.14%	-803	-12.80%	6,273
Ogle	11,253	45.13%	13,144	52.72%	537	2.15%	-1,891	-7.59%	24,934
Peoria	45,906	56.19%	34,579	42.32%	1,219	1.49%	11,327	13.87%	81,704
Perry	4,701	47.03%	5,086	50.89%	208	2.08%	-385	-3.86%	9,995
Piatt	3,859	42.79%	4,991	55.34%	168	1.86%	-1,132	-12.55%	9,018
Pike	3,024	39.57%	4,457	58.31%	162	2.12%	-1,433	-18.74%	7,643
Pope	845	37.88%	1,343	60.20%	43	1.93%	-498	-22.32%	2,231
Pulaski	1,638	50.09%	1,593	48.72%	39	1.19%	45	1.37%	3,270
Putnam	1,900	56.85%	1,378	41.23%	64	1.92%	522	15.62%	3,342
Randolph	7,395	48.64%	7,538	49.59%	269	1.77%	-143	-0.95%	15,202
Richland	3,181	41.46%	4,329	56.42%	163	2.12%	-1,148	-14.96%	7,673
Rock Island	42,210	61.52%	25,364	36.97%	1,034	1.51%	16,846	24.55%	68,608
Saline	5,083	44.29%	6,099	53.15%	294	2.56%	-1,016	-8.86%	11,476
Sangamon	51,300	51.25%	46,945	46.90%	1,861	1.86%	4,355	4.35%	100,106
Schuyler	1,900	49.49%	1,833	47.75%	106	2.76%	67	1.74%	3,839
Scott	1,090	41.81%	1,455	55.81%	62	2.38%	-365	-14.00%	2,607
Shelby	4,245	38.94%	6,396	58.67%	261	2.39%	-2,151	-19.73%	10,902
St. Clair	76,160	60.42%	47,958	38.05%	1,936	1.54%	28,202	22.37%	126,054
Stark	1,357	46.49%	1,513	51.83%	49	1.68%	-156	-5.34%	2,919
Stephenson	11,349	52.40%	9,909	45.75%	399	1.84%	1,440	6.65%	21,657
Tazewell	29,384	45.87%	33,247	51.90%	1,429	2.23%	-3,863	-6.03%	64,060
Union	3,918	42.80%	5,003	54.65%	233	2.55%	-1,085	-11.85%	9,154
Vermilion	16,246	49.21%	16,054	48.62%	716	2.17%	192	0.59%	33,016
Wabash	2,462	42.49%	3,254	56.16%	78	1.35%	-792	-13.67%	5,794
Warren	4,286	53.17%	3,637	45.12%	138	1.71%	649	8.05%	8,061
Washington	3,342	42.13%	4,473	56.39%	117	1.48%	-1,131	-14.26%	7,932
Wayne	2,547	31.56%	5,390	66.78%	134	1.66%	-2,843	-35.22%	8,071
White	3,315	44.48%	3,987	53.50%	151	2.03%	-672	-9.02%	7,453
Whiteside	15,607	57.82%	10,883	40.32%	504	1.87%	4,724	17.50%	26,994
Will	160,406	55.86%	122,597	42.69%	4,178	1.45%	37,809	13.17%	287,181
Williamson	12,589	41.59%	17,039	56.30%	638	2.11%	-4,450	-14.71%	30,266
Winnebago	70,034	55.27%	53,886	42.53%	2,784	2.20%	16,148	12.74%	126,704
Woodford	6,999	35.82%	12,191	62.39%	350	1.79%	-5,192	-26.57%	19,540
Totals	3,419,348	61.83%	2,031,179	36.73%	79,652	1.44%	1,388,169	25.10%	5,530,179

==== Counties that flipped from Republican to Democratic ====
- Boone (largest city: Belvidere)
- Bureau (largest city: Princeton)
- Carroll (largest city: Savanna)
- Cass (largest city: Beardstown)
- Coles (largest city: Charleston)
- DeKalb (largest city: DeKalb)
- DuPage (largest city: Aurora)
- Gallatin (largest city: Shawneetown)
- Grundy (largest city: Morris)
- Henry (largest city: Kewanee)
- Kane (largest city: Aurora)
- Jo Daviess (largest city: Galena)
- Kankakee (largest city: Kankakee)
- Kendall (largest village: Oswego)
- Lake (largest city: Waukegan)
- LaSalle (largest city: Ottawa)
- Macon (largest city: Decatur)
- Macoupin (largest city: Carlinville)
- Mason (largest city: Havana)
- McDonough (largest city: Macomb)
- McHenry (largest city: Crystal Lake)
- McLean (largest city: Bloomington)
- Montgomery (largest city: Litchfield)
- Pulaski (largest city: Mounds)
- Sangamon (largest city: Springfield)
- Schuyler (largest city: Rushville)
- Stephenson (largest city: Freeport)
- Vermilion (largest city: Danville)
- Warren (largest city: Monmouth)
- Will (largest city: Joliet)
- Winnebago (largest city: Rockford)

=== By congressional district ===
Barack Obama won 16 of the state's 19 congressional districts, including four districts held by Republicans.

District	Obama	McCain	Representative
1st	86.53%	12.93%	Bobby Rush
2nd	89.68%	9.86%	Jesse Jackson Jr.
3rd	63.60%	35.08%	Dan Lipinski
4th	85.44%	13.22%	Luis Gutierrez
5th	72.82%	26.22%	Rahm Emanuel (110th Congress)
5th	72.82%	26.22%	Mike Quigley (111th Congress)
6th	55.91%	42.76%	Peter Roskam
7th	87.77%	11.57%	Danny K. Davis
8th	55.74%	42.86%	Melissa Bean
9th	72.34%	26.43%	Jan Schakowsky
10th	60.92%	38.13%	Mark Kirk
11th	53.32%	45.14%	Jerry Weller (110th Congress)
11th	53.32%	45.14%	Debbie Halvorson (111th Congress)
12th	55.49%	42.89%	Jerry Costello
13th	54.21%	44.60%	Judy Biggert
14th	54.83%	43.77%	Dennis Hastert (110th Congress)
14th	54.83%	43.77%	Bill Foster (111th Congress)
15th	47.82%	50.43%	Timothy V. Johnson
16th	52.78%	45.52%	Donald Manzullo
17th	56.39%	42.15%	Phil Hare
18th	48.32%	50.03%	Ray LaHood (110th Congress)
18th	48.32%	50.03%	Aaron Schock (111th Congress)
19th	43.98%	54.25%	John Shimkus

== Electors ==
Technically the voters of Illinois cast their ballots for electors: representatives to the Electoral College. Illinois is allocated 21 electors because it has 19 congressional districts and 2 senators. All candidates who appear on the ballot or qualify to receive write-in votes must submit a list of 21 electors, who pledge to vote for their candidate and the candidate's running mate. Whoever wins the majority of votes in the state is awarded all 21 electoral votes. Their chosen electors then vote for president and vice president. Although electors are pledged to their candidate and running mate, they are not obligated to vote for them. An elector who votes for someone other than their candidate is known as a faithless elector.

The electors of each state and the District of Columbia met on December 15, 2008, to cast their votes for president and vice president. The Electoral College itself never meets as one body. Instead the electors from each state and the District of Columbia met in their respective capitols.

The following were the members of the Electoral College from the state. All 21 were pledged to Barack Obama and Joe Biden:

1. Constance A. Howard
2. Carrie Austin
3. Shirley R. Madigan
4. Ricardo Muñoz
5. James DeLeo
6. Marge Friedman
7. Vera Davis
8. Nancy Shepardson
9. William Marovitz
10. Lauren Beth Gash
11. Debbie Halvorson
12. Molly McKenzie
13. Julia Kennedy Beckman
14. Mark Guethle
15. Lynn Foster
16. John M. Nelson
17. Mary Boland
18. Shirley McCombs
19. Don Johnston
20. Barbara Flynn Currie
21. John P. Daley

== See also ==
- United States presidential elections in Illinois
- 2008 Republican Party presidential primaries
- 2008 Democratic Party presidential primaries
