= Rochester, Wabash County, Illinois =

Rochester, Illinois
- Unincorporated community
- Location within Illinois Location within the United States
- Coordinates: 38°20′44″N 87°49′41″W
- Country: United States
- State: Illinois
- County: Wabash
- Elevation: 394 ft (120 m)
- Time zone: UTC-6 (Central (CST))
  - Summer (DST): UTC-5 (CDT)
- Area code: 618
- GNIS feature ID: 416784

Rochester is an unincorporated community in Wabash County, Illinois, United States. Rochester is located on the Wabash River 2 miles (3.2 km) east of Keensburg.
