= Luke Drone =

American football player (born 1984)

No. 7, 14
- Position: Quarterback

Personal information
- Born: December 18, 1984 (age 41); Evansville, Indiana, U.S.
- Listed height: 6 ft 1 in (1.85 m)
- Listed weight: 217 lb (98 kg)

Career information
- High school: Mount Carmel (IL)
- College: Illinois State
- NFL draft: 2008: undrafted

Career history
- Buffalo Bills (2008)*; Peoria Pirates (2009); Bloomington Extreme (2010); Dallas Vigilantes (2011); Chicago Rush (2012–2013)
- * Offseason or practice squad member only

Awards and highlights
- First-team All-Gateway (2006)

Career AFL statistics
- Passing yards: 2,082
- TDs-INTs: 39–12
- QB rating: 104.65
- Rushing yards: 66
- Rushing TDs: 18
- Stats at ArenaFan.com

Luke Drone (born December 18, 1984) is an American former professional football quarterback. He was signed by the Buffalo Bills as an undrafted free agent in 2008. He played college football at Illinois State.

== Early life ==
Drone attended Mt. Carmel High School, Illinois, and was a four-year starter in baseball and a three-year starter in football and basketball. As a senior, he threw 30 TDs and passed for over 2,000 yards, while rushing for over 1,000 yards with 15 TDs. Drone was a First-team All-State selection and was academic All-State as well. He was voted the conference MVP as his team posted a 25–3 record during his junior and senior years, finishing as the state runner-up both seasons. As a junior, Drone passed for over 1,900 yards and 22 touchdowns. He averaged 17 points per game his senior season in basketball, while hitting .400 at the plate in his final year as a prep.

== College career ==
As a senior at Illinois State Drone completed 192 passes for 2,222 yards and 18 touchdowns. In 2006 Drone was a First-team All-Gateway selection after starting every game at quarterback. He completed 203 passes for 2,961 yards and 19 touchdowns. The prior season, 2005, he was an honorable mention All-Gateway selection and started all 11 games at quarterback as a sophomore. He passed for 2,930 yards and 22 touchdown passes In 2004, he played in seven games and completed one pass on two attempts for 10 yards.

== Professional career ==
Drone was signed by the Buffalo Bills as an undrafted free agent in 2008 (practice squad). He was the first Mount Carmel High player to make it to the NFL since Gil Mains. He signed with the Peoria Pirates of the af2 for the 2009 season.

Drone later became a football coach.
