= Allendale, Illinois =

- Village
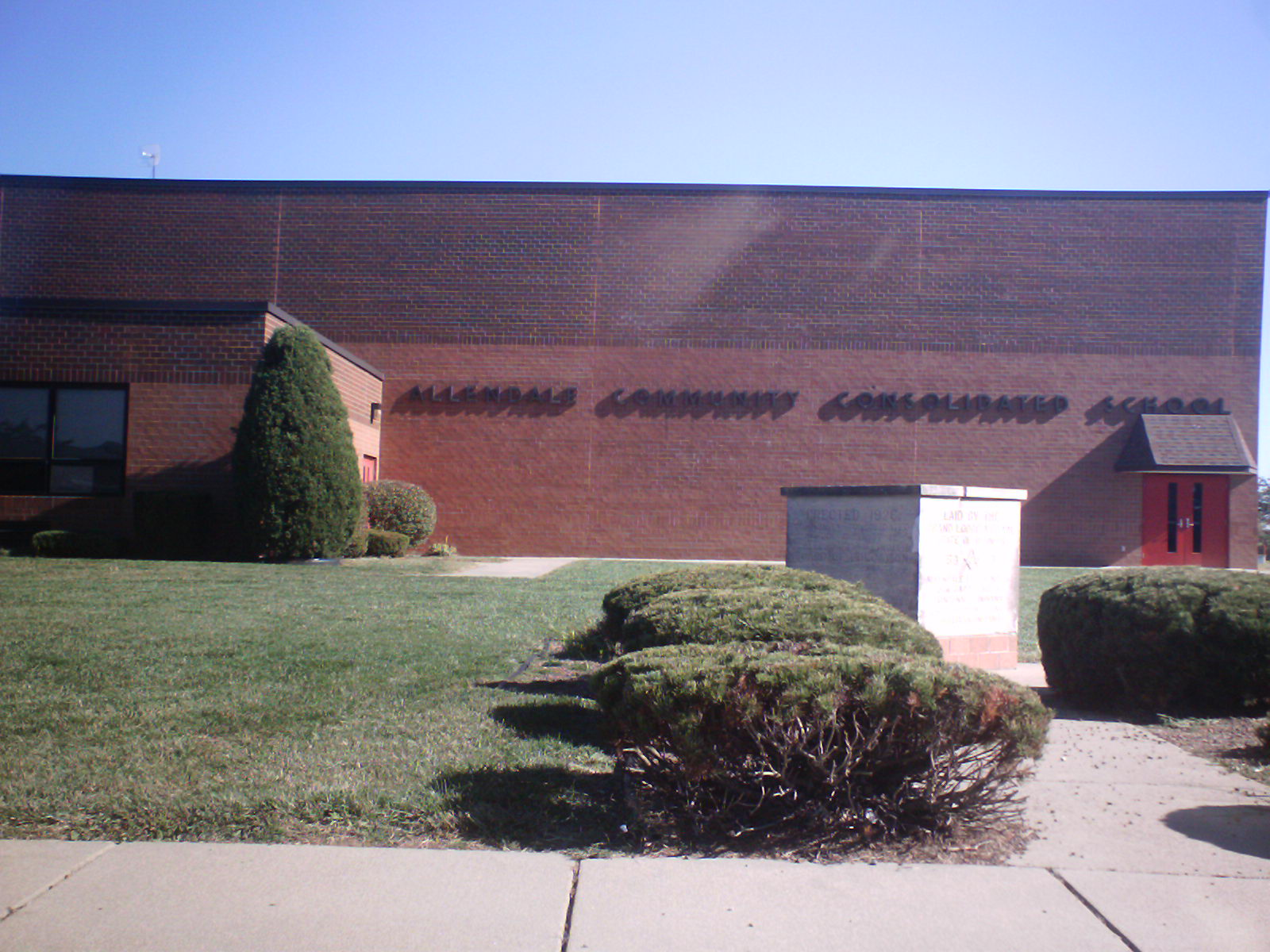
- The Allendale Community Consolidated School
- Interactive map of Allendale, Illinois
- Location in Illinois Allendale, Illinois (the United States) Allendale, Illinois (North America)
- Coordinates: 38°31′39″N 87°42′37″W
- Country: United States
- State: Illinois
- County: Wabash
- Precinct: Wabash

Area
  - Total: 0.31 sq mi (0.79 km^{2})
  - Land: 0.31 sq mi (0.79 km^{2})
  - Water: 0 sq mi (0.00 km^{2})
- Elevation: 479 ft (146 m)

Population (2020)
  - Total: 458
  - Density: 1,492/sq mi (576.1/km^{2})
- Time zone: UTC-6 (CST)
  - Summer (DST): UTC-5 (CDT)
- ZIP code: 62410
- Area code: 618
- FIPS code: 17-00815
- GNIS feature ID: 2397935

Allendale is a village in Wabash Precinct, Wabash County, Illinois. The population was 458 at the 2020 census.

== History ==
Allendale was founded in 1869, taking its name from Colonel C. M. Allen, a railroad official.

=== 1989 tornado ===
On January 7, 1989, an F4 tornado leveled a good portion of the town of Allendale and injured 55 of its residents. The tornado directly impacted Allendale's school, destroying the grade school portion, built in the 1960s. The high school portion, built in the late 1920s, withstood the storm with minimal damage, despite being condemned two years earlier due to lobbying by Mt. Carmel's District 348 in an attempt to usurp District 17. Relief funds paid to build a brand new school to be used by the elementary and middle school students of District 17. Their motto was "NEVER BACK DOWN, NEVER GIVE UP."

== Geography ==
Allendale is located 4 miles (6.4 km) northeast of Patton and 1.75 miles (2.82 km) east-northeast of Adams Corner.

According to the 2010 census, Allendale has a total area of 0.31 square miles (0.80 km^{2}), all land.

== Demographics ==
Historical population
Census	Pop.	Note	%±
1880	283		—
1920	451		—
1930	462		2.4%
1940	432		−6.5%
1950	442		2.3%
1960	465		5.2%
1970	425		−8.6%
1980	613		44.2%
1990	476		−22.3%
2000	528		10.9%
2010	475		−10.0%
2020	458		−3.6%
U.S. Decennial Census

=== 2000 census ===
As of the census of 2000, there were 528 people, 192 households, and 142 families residing in the village. The population density was 1,755.5 inhabitants per square mile (677.8/km^{2}). There were 205 housing units at an average density of 681.6 per square mile (263.2/km^{2}). The racial makeup of the village was 97.92% White, 0.76% African American, 0.95% from other races, and 0.38% from two or more races. Hispanic or Latino of any race were 1.14% of the population.

There were 192 households, out of which 35.4% had children under the age of 18 living with them, 60.9% were married couples living together, 10.4% had a female householder with no husband present, and 26.0% were non-families. 25.5% of all households were made up of individuals, and 12.0% had someone living alone who was 65 years of age or older. The average household size was 2.65 and the average family size was 3.20.

In the village, the population was spread out, with 28.4% under the age of 18, 10.2% from 18 to 24, 25.8% from 25 to 44, 23.7% from 45 to 64, and 11.9% who were 65 years of age or older. The median age was 37 years. For every 100 females, there were 98.5 males. For every 100 females age 18 and over, there were 93.8 males.

The median income for a household in the village was $31,705, and the median income for a family was $38,472. Males had a median income of $30,000 versus $16,719 for females. The per capita income for the village was $12,117. About 12.1% of families and 16.6% of the population were below the poverty line, including 26.4% of those under age 18 and 1.9% of those age 65 or over.

=== 2020 census ===
As of the 2020 decennial U.S. census, the total population of the village was 458, with a plurality of the people being 20 to 24 years old. There were 182 total households, out of 191 total housing units, and the median household income was $70,500. The employment rate was 53.2%. 17.9% of the population was under 18.

== Education ==
It is in Allendale Community Consolidated School District 17, which has grades Pre-Kindergarten through 8. Students are sent onward to Mount Carmel High School, of the Wabash CUSD 348.
