= Maud, Illinois =

- Unincorporated community
- Location within Illinois Location within the United States
- Coordinates: 38°23′51″N 87°51′19″W
- Country: United States
- State: Illinois
- County: Wabash
- Elevation: 430 ft (130 m)
- Time zone: UTC-6 (Central (CST))
  - Summer (DST): UTC-5 (CDT)
- Area code: 618
- GNIS feature ID: 413134

Maud is an unincorporated community in Wabash County, Illinois, United States. Maud is 3 miles (4.8 km) east-northeast of Bellmont.
