= Odgen, Illinois =

- Unincorporated community
- Location within Illinois Location within the United States
- Coordinates: 38°27′07″N 87°49′37″W
- Country: United States
- State: Illinois
- County: Wabash
- Elevation: 489 ft (149 m)
- Time zone: UTC-6 (Central (CST))
  - Summer (DST): UTC-5 (CDT)
- Area code: 618
- GNIS feature ID: 423032

Odgen is an unincorporated community in Wabash County, Illinois, United States. Odgen is 4.5 miles (7.2 km) northwest of Mount Carmel.
