= Adams Corner, Illinois =

- Unincorporated community
- Location within Illinois Location within the United States
- Coordinates: 38°30′47″N 87°44′31″W
- Country: United States
- State: Illinois
- County: Wabash
- Elevation: 456 ft (139 m)
- Time zone: UTC-6 (Central (CST))
  - Summer (DST): UTC-5 (CDT)
- Area code: 618
- GNIS feature ID: 422384

Adams Corner is an unincorporated community in Wabash County, in the U.S. state of Illinois.

Adams Corner bears the name of Daniel Adams, a local pioneer.
