= Wabash County, Illinois =

County in Illinois, United States

- County
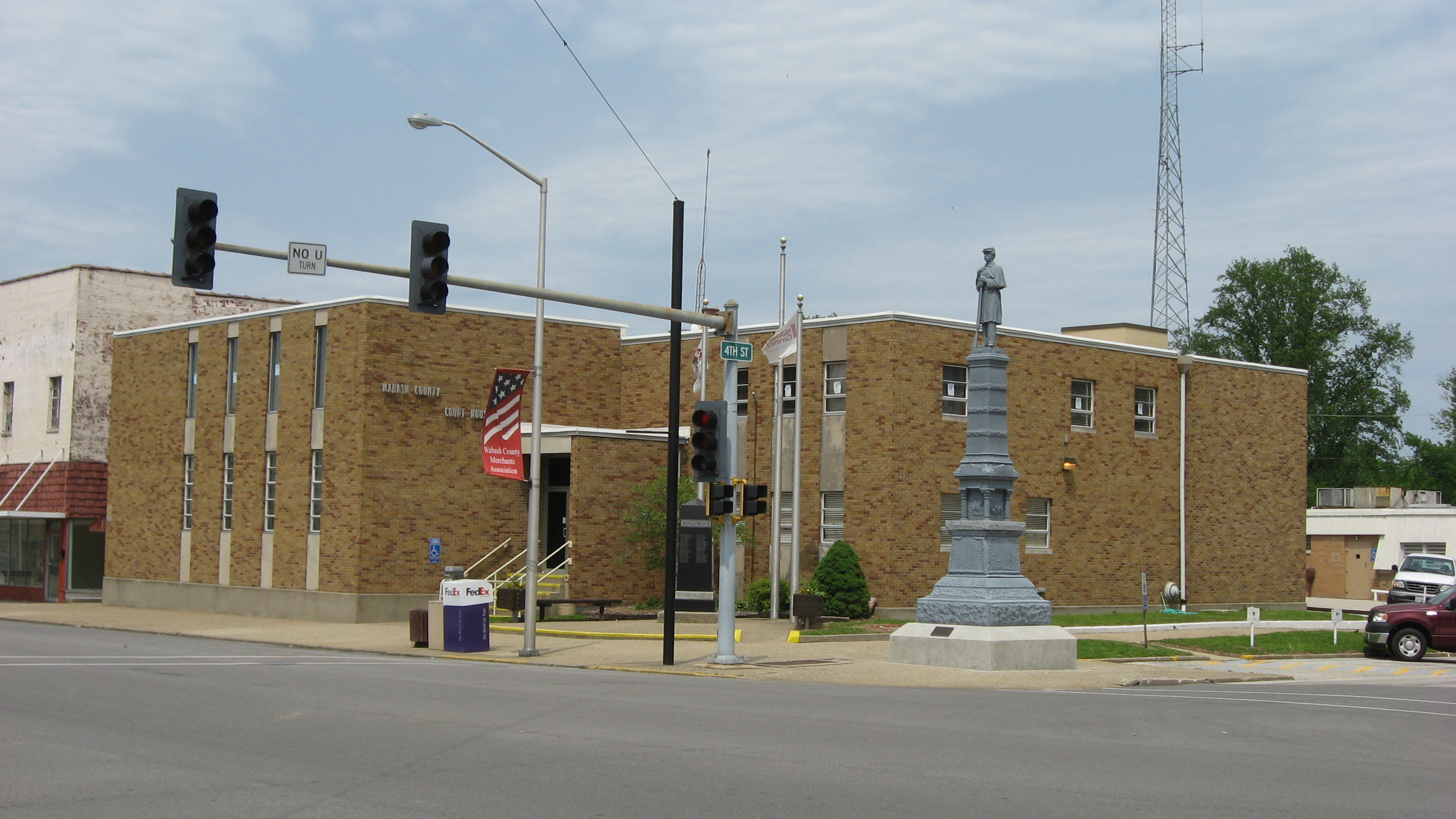
- Wabash County Courthouse in Mount Carmel

- Location within the U.S. state of Illinois
- Coordinates: 38.44°N 87.84°W
- Country: United States
- State: Illinois
- Founded: 1824
- Named for: Wabash River
- Seat: Mount Carmel
- Largest city: Mount Carmel

Area
  - Total: 228 sq mi (590 km^{2})
  - Land: 223 sq mi (580 km^{2})
  - Water: 4.3 sq mi (11 km^{2}) 1.9%

Population (2020)
  - Total: 11,361
  - Estimate (2025): 10,907 ▼
  - Density: 50.9/sq mi (19.7/km^{2})
- Time zone: UTC−6 (Central)
  - Summer (DST): UTC−5 (CDT)
- Congressional district: 12th

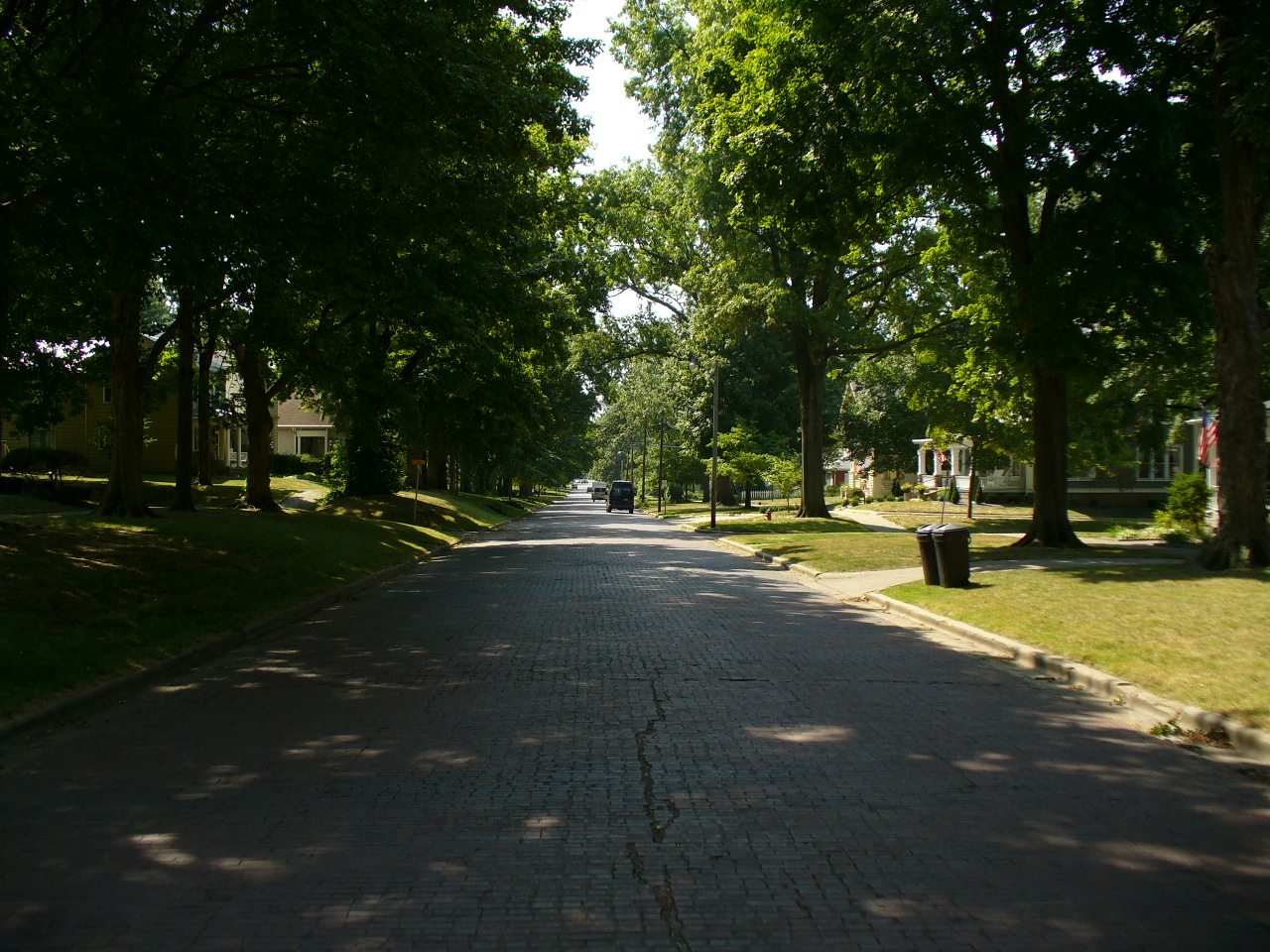
Cherry St. in Mount Carmel, still paved in brick, is home to many interesting examples of architecture from around the start of the 20th century

Wabash County is a county located in the U.S. state of Illinois. According to the 2020 census, it had a population of 11,361. Its county seat is Mount Carmel. It is located in the southern portion of Illinois known locally as "Little Egypt".

== History ==
Wabash County was formed in 1824 out of Edwards County. This averted to an armed confrontation between the militias of Albion and Mt. Carmel after the county seat was moved from a town near the current city of Mount Carmel to Albion.

The county is named for the Wabash River, which forms its eastern and southern borders. The name "Wabash" is an English spelling of the French name for the river, "Ouabache."' French traders named the river after the Miami Indian word for the river, "Wabashike," (pronounced "Wah-bah-she-keh"), the word for "pure white." Much of the river bottom is white limestone, now obscured by mud.

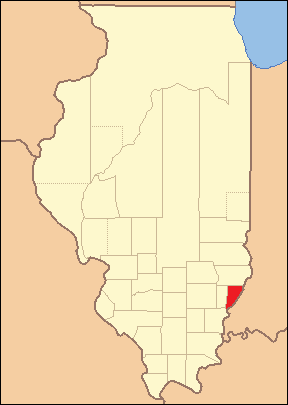
Wabash County at the time of its creation in 1824

A 329 acres (1.33 km^{2}) remnant of the county's original Eastern Woodlands ecosystem can be found in the Forest of the Wabash, located within the county's Beall Woods State Park.

In the 1920s a notable hotel and resort operated in Wabash County nearby the Grand Rapids Dam on the Wabash River. Named the Grand Rapids Hotel, it was owned by Frederick Hinde Zimmerman. During the hotel's nine-year existence, it catered to individuals from all over the United States. In July 2011, John Matthew Nolan published a detailed history of the Grand Rapids Hotel.

=== Earthquake ===
On the morning of April 18, 2008, at 4:37am local time, one of the largest earthquakes in Illinois history hit the area. The epicenter of this tremor was in Lick Prairie Township, near the middle of the county. The tremor was felt for a wide radius, more than 400 miles away in Nebraska.

== Geography ==
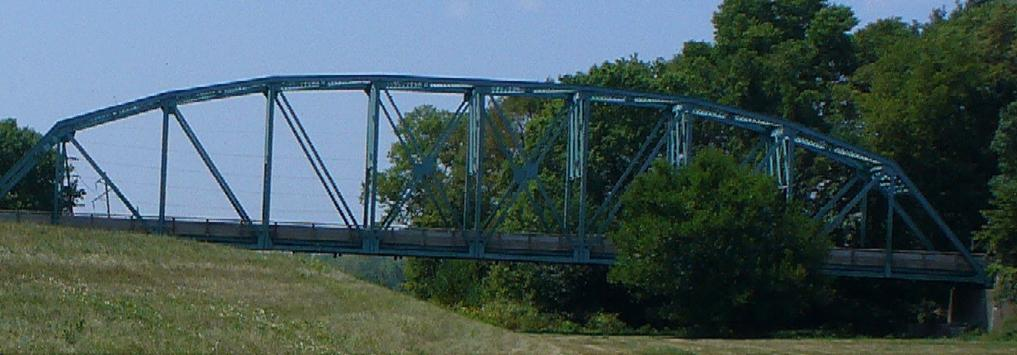
Bridge on Illinois Route 15 connecting Wabash and Gibson counties. This span no longer exists.

According to the U.S. Census Bureau, the county has a total area of 228 square miles (590 km^{2}), of which 223 square miles (580 km^{2}) is land and 4.3 square miles (11 km^{2}) (1.9%) is water. It is the fifth-smallest county in Illinois by area.

The Wabash River to the east and the Bonpas Creek to the west join at the southern tip of the county; the Bonpas Creek separating the two counties, Wabash County from the Edwards County.

=== Climate and weather ===
Mount Carmel, Illinois

Climate chart (precipitation, max. and min. temperature)
J	F	M	A	M	J	J	A	S	O	N	D
2.9 38 21	2.7 44 25	4.2 54 35	4.2 66 44	5.1 76 54	3.7 85 63	4.2 89 67	3.6 87 65	2.8 81 57	3 70 45	4.2 55 36	3.1 43 25
- █ Average max. and min. temperatures in °F
- █ Precipitation totals in inches
- Source: The Weather Channel
Metric conversion
J	F	M	A	M	J	J	A	S	O	N	D
74 3 −6	69 7 −4	105 12 2	108 19 7	130 24 12	94 29 17	108 32 19	92 31 18	71 27 14	77 21 7	106 13 2	77 6 −4
- █ Average max. and min. temperatures in °C
- █ Precipitation totals in mm

In recent years, average temperatures in the county seat of Mount Carmel have ranged from a low of 21 °F (−6 °C) in January to a high of 89 °F (32 °C) in July, although a record low of −19 °F (−28 °C) was recorded in January 1985 and a record high of 102 °F (39 °C) was recorded in July 1988. Average monthly precipitation ranged from 2.73 inches (69 mm) in February to 5.12 inches (130 mm) in May.

=== Transit ===
- Rides Mass Transit District

=== Major highways ===
- Illinois Route 1
- Illinois Route 15

=== Adjacent counties ===
- Lawrence County - north
- Knox County, Indiana - northeast
- Gibson County, Indiana - south and mostly east
- Edwards County - west
- Richland County - northwest

== Demographics ==
Historical population
Census	Pop.	Note	%±
1830	2,710		—
1840	4,240		56.5%
1850	4,690		10.6%
1860	7,313		55.9%
1870	8,841		20.9%
1880	9,945		12.5%
1890	11,866		19.3%
1900	12,583		6.0%
1910	14,913		18.5%
1920	14,034		−5.9%
1930	13,197		−6.0%
1940	13,724		4.0%
1950	14,651		6.8%
1960	14,047		−4.1%
1970	12,841		−8.6%
1980	13,713		6.8%
1990	13,111		−4.4%
2000	12,937		−1.3%
2010	11,947		−7.7%
2020	11,361		−4.9%
2025 (est.)	10,907	▼	−4.0%
U.S. Decennial Census; 1790-1960 1900-1990; 1990-2000 2010-2013

=== 2020 census ===
Wabash County, Illinois – Racial and ethnic composition Note: the US Census treats Hispanic/Latino as an ethnic category. This table excludes Latinos from the racial categories and assigns them to a separate category. Hispanics/Latinos may be of any race.
Race / Ethnicity (NH = Non-Hispanic)	Pop 1980	Pop 1990	Pop 2000	Pop 2010	Pop 2020	% 1980	% 1990	% 2000	% 2010	% 2020
White alone (NH)	13,542	12,911	12,602	11,498	10,520	98.75%	98.47%	97.41%	96.24%	92.60%
Black or African American alone (NH)	22	35	51	73	53	0.16%	0.27%	0.39%	0.61%	0.47%
Native American or Alaska Native alone (NH)	35	11	21	17	15	0.26%	0.08%	0.16%	0.14%	0.13%
Asian alone (NH)	45	80	57	63	251	0.33%	0.61%	0.44%	0.53%	2.21%
Native Hawaiian or Pacific Islander alone (NH)	x	x	6	5	6	x	x	0.05%	0.04%	0.05%
Other race alone (NH)	2	1	3	10	15	0.01%	0.01%	0.02%	0.08%	0.13%
Mixed race or Multiracial (NH)	x	x	102	123	323	x	x	0.79%	1.03%	2.84%
Hispanic or Latino (any race)	67	73	95	158	178	0.49%	0.56%	0.73%	1.32%	1.57%
Total	13,713	13,111	12,937	11,947	11,361	100.00%	100.00%	100.00%	100.00%	100.00%

As of the 2020 census, the county had a population of 11,361. The median age was 43.1 years. 22.0% of residents were under the age of 18 and 21.6% of residents were 65 years of age or older. For every 100 females there were 100.4 males, and for every 100 females age 18 and over there were 98.5 males age 18 and over.

The racial makeup of the county was 93.1% White, 0.5% Black or African American, 0.2% American Indian and Alaska Native, 2.2% Asian, 0.1% Native Hawaiian and Pacific Islander, 0.5% from some other race, and 3.5% from two or more races. Hispanic or Latino residents of any race comprised 1.6% of the population.

61.3% of residents lived in urban areas, while 38.7% lived in rural areas.

There were 4,670 households in the county, of which 26.5% had children under the age of 18 living in them. Of all households, 50.6% were married-couple households, 18.1% were households with a male householder and no spouse or partner present, and 25.6% were households with a female householder and no spouse or partner present. About 31.1% of all households were made up of individuals and 15.8% had someone living alone who was 65 years of age or older.

There were 5,409 housing units, of which 13.7% were vacant. Among occupied housing units, 74.3% were owner-occupied and 25.7% were renter-occupied. The homeowner vacancy rate was 2.6% and the rental vacancy rate was 15.3%.

=== 2010 census ===
As of the 2010 United States census, there were 11,947 people, 5,012 households, and 3,310 families residing in the county. The population density was 53.5 inhabitants per square mile (20.7/km^{2}). There were 5,585 housing units at an average density of 25.0 per square mile (9.7/km^{2}). The racial makeup of the county was 96.9% white, 0.6% black or African American, 0.6% Asian, 0.2% American Indian, 0.5% from other races, and 1.1% from two or more races. Those of Hispanic or Latino origin made up 1.3% of the population. In terms of ancestry, 25.6% were German, 12.3% were English, 11.7% were American, and 8.4% were Irish.

Of the 5,012 households, 29.0% had children under the age of 18 living with them, 52.9% were married couples living together, 9.3% had a female householder with no husband present, 34.0% were non-families, and 29.4% of all households were made up of individuals. The average household size was 2.37 and the average family size was 2.91. The median age was 42.0 years.

The median income for a household in the county was $46,026 and the median income for a family was $55,611. Males had a median income of $44,932 versus $28,292 for females. The per capita income for the county was $23,350. About 7.2% of families and 13.0% of the population were below the poverty line, including 12.2% of those under age 18 and 8.6% of those age 65 or over.

== Communities ==
=== Cities ===
- Mount Carmel (seat)

=== Villages ===
- Allendale
- Bellmont
- Keensburg

=== Unincorporated communities ===
- Adams Corner
- Cowling
- Friendsville
- Lancaster
- Maud
- Odgen
- Rochester

=== Precincts ===
Wabash County is one of 17 Illinois counties that use the term precinct instead of township.

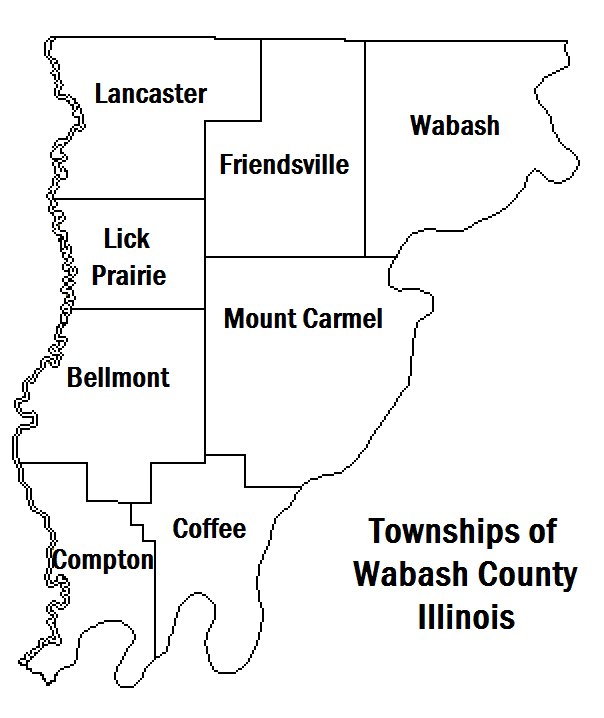
Precincts of Wabash County

- Bellmont (Bellmont)
- Coffee (Keensburg)
- Compton (East Grayville)
- Friendsville (Friendsville)
- Lancaster (Lancaster)
- Lick Prairie (Lick Prairie)
- Mount Carmel (Mount Carmel)
- Wabash (Allendale)

Wabash County precincts and their boundaries

== Politics ==
Like most of Southern Illinois, Wabash County is a Republican stronghold that was formerly a Democratic stronghold. For most of its history, it only voted for Republicans if they won a massive victory in Illinois more broadly. Around the 1940s, the county shifted allegiances: the only Democrats to win Wabash County afterward were Lyndon Johnson in his 1964 landslide for presidency and conservative Democrat Glenn Poshard in his unsuccessful 1998 run for governor. Donald Trump received about 75% of Wabash County's vote in each of his three presidential bids.

When the county was first founded, it faithfully voted for National Republican/ Anti-Jacksonian candidates. After the National Republican party's demise, Wabash County would continue strong support for the Whig party. In 1856, its first votes after the dissolution of the Whig party were for Millard Fillmore in the Know Nothing party for president and Republican William Henry Bissell for governor. However, Wabash County began its century-long Democratic favor immediately after. Except for some anomalous victories during the 1920s, Republicans were unable to compete in elections until the 1940s. As Democrats shifted leftward on social issues and Republicans targeted Bible Belt religious voters, Wabash County moved in favor the Republican party. Republicans first became competitive in the 1940s, dominant by the 1950s, and have been winning every election from the turn of the millennium onward.

United States presidential election results for Wabash County, Illinois
Year	Republican		Democratic		Third party(ies)	
Year	No.	%	No.	%	No.	%
1892	1,112	40.69%	1,428	52.25%	193	7.06%
1896	1,321	42.22%	1,739	55.58%	69	2.21%
1900	1,226	40.96%	1,643	54.89%	124	4.14%
1904	1,298	44.57%	1,300	44.64%	314	10.78%
1908	1,511	43.06%	1,814	51.70%	184	5.24%
1912	601	18.08%	1,676	50.41%	1,048	31.52%
1916	2,600	42.41%	3,264	53.24%	267	4.35%
1920	2,871	52.40%	2,514	45.88%	94	1.72%
1924	2,564	45.61%	2,442	43.44%	615	10.94%
1928	2,373	37.26%	3,955	62.10%	41	0.64%
1932	2,309	34.49%	4,280	63.93%	106	1.58%
1936	2,860	39.59%	4,214	58.33%	150	2.08%
1940	3,659	45.94%	4,187	52.57%	119	1.49%
1944	3,496	52.95%	3,026	45.83%	81	1.23%
1948	2,916	49.44%	2,857	48.44%	125	2.12%
1952	4,246	61.38%	2,661	38.47%	10	0.14%
1956	4,425	61.92%	2,713	37.97%	8	0.11%
1960	4,261	58.55%	3,013	41.40%	4	0.05%
1964	2,905	43.84%	3,721	56.16%	0	0.00%
1968	3,529	55.21%	2,244	35.11%	619	9.68%
1972	4,310	68.35%	1,985	31.48%	11	0.17%
1976	3,388	54.41%	2,781	44.66%	58	0.93%
1980	3,571	61.18%	1,975	33.84%	291	4.99%
1984	3,639	66.73%	1,795	32.92%	19	0.35%
1988	3,453	60.30%	2,241	39.14%	32	0.56%
1992	2,485	39.82%	2,436	39.04%	1,319	21.14%
1996	2,381	45.15%	2,177	41.28%	716	13.58%
2000	3,406	61.84%	1,987	36.07%	115	2.09%
2004	4,212	70.13%	1,752	29.17%	42	0.70%
2008	3,254	56.16%	2,462	42.49%	78	1.35%
2012	3,478	67.74%	1,590	30.97%	66	1.29%
2016	4,047	74.07%	1,151	21.07%	266	4.87%
2020	4,237	75.57%	1,253	22.35%	117	2.09%
2024	4,095	75.93%	1,200	22.25%	98	1.82%

== Education ==
School districts include:

- Allendale Community Consolidated School District 17
- Edwards County Community Unit School District 1
- Grayville Community Unit School District 1
- Wabash Community Unit School District 348

== See also ==
- National Register of Historic Places listings in Wabash County
- Grand Rapids Hotel
- Grand Rapids Dam
- Hanging Rock (Wabash River)
- Charles T. Hinde
- Thomas S. Hinde
- Frederick Hinde Zimmerman
