= Beall Woods State Park =

State park in Wabash County, Illinois

- IUCN category V (protected landscape/seascape)
- Location within Illinois Location within the United States
- Location: Wabash County, Illinois, USA
- Nearest city: Keensburg, Illinois
- Coordinates: 38°21′31″N 87°49′30″W
- Area: 635 acres (257 ha)
- Established: 1966
- Governing body: Illinois Department of Natural Resources
- Website: Official website

Beall Woods State Park is an Illinois state park on 635 acres (257 ha) bordering the Wabash River and Keensburg in Wabash County, Illinois in the United States. 329 acres (133 ha) of the state park is an old-growth forest designated as a protected Natural Area by the state of Illinois. The trees within the forest consist overwhelmingly of hardwoods of the former Eastern Woodlands ecosystem.

Portions of Beall Woods State Park have been designated a National Natural Landmark as the Forest of the Wabash. The state park was created in 1966, after the death of the last of the Beall family who had maintained the forest in an untouched state since the early 19th century. The park hosts a small primitive campground and maintains a visitor center which opened in April 2001. The park maintains 6 1/4 miles (10.1 km) of hiking trails, primarily through the Forest of the Wabash portion of the park.

== Forest of the Wabash ==
The Forest of the Wabash Natural Area within Beall Woods State Park contains trees from 64 separate species. Foresters have counted more than 300 climax trees with trunks of greater than 30 inches (76 cm) diameter at breast i.e. 40 inches (1 m) high. Some of the trees in the Forest of the Wabash are more than 120 feet (37 m) tall.

Trees of note include the white oak (the state tree of Illinois), the tuliptree (the state tree of Indiana, across the Wabash River), the American sycamore, and the American sweetgum. One of the sweetgums of this Forest is designated as the "state champion" tree as being the largest member of this species known to grow within the boundaries of Illinois.

The Forest of the Wabash was patented by the federal government to the Beall family in the early 19th century, and was owned by them as an undisturbed woodlot until the 1960s. Meanwhile, almost all of the other old-growth trees in the Wabash Valley were cut down to harvest fine hardwoods, cut timber, or even for firewood. Upon the death of Laura Beall, the last private-sector guardian of the Forest of the Wabash, and after a fight with a lumber company, in 1965 the State of Illinois condemned the Beall farm and forest for public use.

In 2007, Beall Woods State Park was designated as an Important Bird Area of Illinois. The nearest towns with any sizable commercial infrastructure, including hotels and grocery stores, are Grayville and Mount Carmel.
