= Gil Mains =

American football player and wrestler (1929–2009)

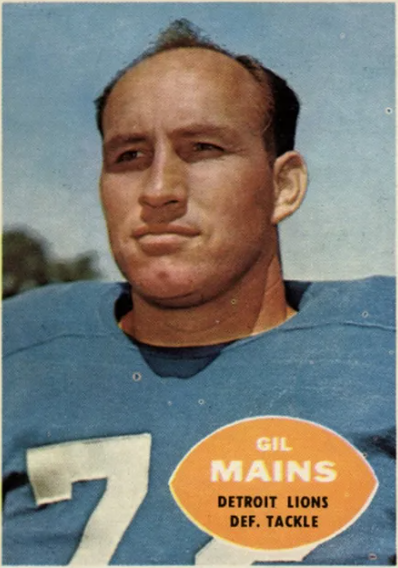
- Mains on a 1960 Topps football card

No. 84, 72, 66
- Positions: Defensive tackle, defensive end

Personal information
- Born: December 17, 1929; Mount Carmel, Illinois, U.S.
- Died: January 10, 2009 (aged 79); West Branch, Michigan, U.S.
- Listed height: 6 ft 2 in (1.88 m)
- Listed weight: 243 lb (110 kg)

Career information
- High school: Mount Carmel
- College: Murray State (1948–1951)
- NFL draft: 1952: 20th round, 237th overall pick

Career history
- Detroit Lions (1953–1954); Toronto Argonauts (1955); Detroit Lions (1955–1961)

Awards and highlights
- 2× NFL champion (1953, 1957); 2× All-OVC (1950, 1951)

Career NFL statistics
- Fumble recoveries: 9
- Total touchdowns: 1
- Stats at Pro Football Reference

Gilbert Lee Mains (December 17, 1929 – January 10, 2009), nicknamed Wild Hoss, was an American professional football player who was a defensive tackle for the Detroit Lions of the National Football League (NFL). He played college football for the Murray State Thoroughbreds and was a two-time All-Ohio Valley Conference selection. He was selected by the Lions in the 20th round of the 1952 NFL draft. After a stint in the military, Mains played for the Lions from 1953 to 1961. He won two NFL championships and was a starter in the 1957 NFL Championship Game. He was known for flying feetfirst into the opponent's wedge on kickoff returns. John Madden called him the greatest wedge breaker of all-time. Pro Football Hall of Famer Tom Fears said Mains was the "dirtiest player" in the NFL. Mains was left crippled for life after an on-field injury. He also spent some time as a professional wrestler and played Canadian football for the Toronto Argonauts. After his NFL career, he was involved in numerous other affairs as well. Mains has been inducted into five different halls of fame.

== Early life ==
Gilbert Lee Mains was born on December 17, 1929, in Mount Carmel, Illinois. He participated in high school football, tumbling, and track at Mount Carmel High School. He was recruited by both the University of Illinois and Murray State College to play college football. Mount Carmel High's head coach, Harry Smith, encouraged Mains to choose Murray State. Mains graduated from Mount Carmel High in 1948. Growing up, he knew baseball player Don Liddle and considered him his idol.

== College career ==
Mains attended Murray State College in Murray, Kentucky, from 1948 to 1951 and played college football for the Murray State Thoroughbreds. He was on the freshman team in 1948. The Racers were Ohio Valley Conference (OVC) champions in 1948, 1950, and 1951. Mains earned All-OVC honors in 1950 and 1951, and was captain of the 1951 All-OVC first-team. He majored in industrial arts and physical education at Murray State. In 1961, The Paducah Sun called Murray "undoubtedly the greatest football player ever to perform for Murray State".

== Professional football career ==
=== Detroit Lions (first stint) ===
Mains was selected by the Detroit Lions in the 20th round, with the 237th overall pick, of the 1952 NFL draft. However, he could not join the team until 1953 due to a stint in the Illinois Army National Guard during the Korean War. While in the military, Mains and Al Lary coached football at Fort Lewis in Washington. Mains served in the 130th Infantry Regiment of the 44th Infantry Division of the Illinois Guard. After linebacker Jim Martin suffered an injury, Mains took Martin's spot in the Lions' lineup for the October 11, 1953, game against the San Francisco 49ers. Prior to the game, Mains said "somebody's going to get hurt when I get into the game against San Francisco." Ironically, Mains then dislocated his elbow on the opening kickoff. He played in three regular season games, starting one, overall for the Lions during the 1953 season. On December 27, 1953, the Lions beat the Cleveland Browns in the 1953 NFL Championship Game by a score of 17–16, but Mains did not play in the game. He made $5,000 during his first year with the Lions. In 1954, he played in all 12 games, starting six after injuries to tackles Thurman McGraw and Gerry Perry. Mains also started one playoff game. He received two votes for United Press NFL Rookie of the Year.

=== Toronto Argonauts ===
Mains, who was entering the option year of his NFL contract in 1955, signed with the Toronto Argonauts of the Interprovincial Rugby Football Union (IRFU) on January 25, 1955, after Toronto offered him more money. The Argonauts offered Mains $11,000, $4,000 more than the $7,000 he made with the Lions in 1954. In July 1955, after Mains missed practices to take part in professional wrestling matches, the Argonauts said they would pay Mains his entire $11,000 no-cut contract and release him if he did not focus on football. Mains played in three games for the Argonauts during the 1955 IRFU season as a two-way tackle. After being "handled in almost shameful fashion" by Tex Coulter in a game against the Montreal Alouettes, Mains left the Argonauts without telling anyone and signed a new contract with the Detroit Lions. Argonauts team director Harry Sonshine stated "I can't blame him for going. His reputation isn't being enhanced by staying here." Mains stated "I had enough of it up there. They don't play my kind of football. Practically all of the other fellows who went up there from the states felt the same way." Mains also said "With Detroit, I played defence. Here I was going both ways. Maybe it was the one-yard difference in the scrimmage lines. I'm a crashing tackle. Playing head-to-head with your man, you can make the initial move fast. With the extra yard to cover, it was difficult to get the same advantage." In December 1955, the Lions sued the Argonauts for having signed Mains and Tom Dublinski earlier in the year.

=== Detroit Lions (second stint) ===
During the 1955 NFL season, Mains appeared in all 12 games, starting six, for the second consecutive year. He also scored a fumble recovery touchdown. He played in eight games, starting six, in 1956, while missing time due to a leg injury. On December 16, 1956, against the Chicago Bears, Mains was involved in a brawl with George Blanda and other players. Lions quarterback Bobby Layne had his arm broken by Ed Meadows of the Bears so Lions head coach Buddy Parker sent Mains into the game to get "revenge". During an extra point attempt, Mains made it through the offensive line and dove feet first into quarterback Ed Brown while simultaneously knocking down kicker George Blanda with a "right cross". Mains was ejected from the game. On December 20, 1956, Los Angeles Rams player Tom Fears claimed that Mains was the "dirtiest player" in the NFL. Mains re-signed with the Lions on July 18, 1957. He added on ten more pounds for the 1957 season, up from the 235 pounds (107 kg) he played at in 1956. In 1957, he started all 12 regular season games and both playoff games, including the 1957 NFL Championship Game victory over the Cleveland Browns. He also recovered two fumbles in the playoffs. In 1994, the Evansville Courier and Press claimed that Mains's two rings from the 1953 and 1957 championship game's were the largest in NFL history. The Mount Carmel Register said that they were a size 22.

By 1958, Mains was working as an insurance salesman during the NFL offseason. He played in 11 games, starting nine during the 1958 NFL season. He also missed some time due to a broken ankle. Mains started all 12 games for the second season in 1959 as the Lions finished with a 3–8–1 record. He re-signed with the Lions in May 1960. He moved into a reserve role during the 1960 season, appearing in all 12 games while only starting one as the Lions won the inaugural Playoff Bowl. In 1961, Mains played in three games as a backup before suffering a season-ending knee injury. While blocking on a punt return, Mains stepped into a drainage hole in Tiger Stadium and Abe Woodson of the 49ers fell on his knee. Mains tore ligaments and fractured the cartilage in his left knee. The knee was broken so bad that it bent backwards. After knee surgery, Mains also had a blood clot in his lungs. He said that even though his reflexes were slower than when he first started playing pro football, he believed he could play a few more years in the NFL once his knee recovered. However, the injury ended up being career-ending. In July 1962, it was reported that doctors said they might have to stiffen his knee permanently to stop the constant pain and swelling. Mains said "They may make me something like Marshal Dillon's 'Chester'", who was noted for his limp. By 1970, Mains was reportedly a "cripple". His knee was "horribly deformed" and bulged out "grotesquely" beneath his pants.

== Legacy ==
Mains finished his NFL career with regular season totals of 85 games played, 53 games started, and nine fumble recoveries for 40 yards and one touchdown. He also played in three playoff games, all starts, and recovered two fumbles for no yards. He wore a wolfskin undershirt while with the Lions, and was also known for flying feetfirst into the opponent's wedge on kickoff returns. This earned Mains the nickname of "Wild Hoss". John Madden said Mains was the greatest wedge breaker of all-time. In 1989, Pro Football Hall of Famer Art Donovan said "You'd have cleat marks on your chest if you were a lead blocker. Nobody wanted that job. I don't think the guy had any sense. In Detroit one time it was raining and he spent the game picking up mud and throwing it in Jack Little's face." Mains's cleats once cut open Hardy Brown's thigh and it had to be stitched back together before Brown could return to the game. Mains played both ways on special teams. Mains had one football card produced of him during his NFL career; card No. 49 in the 1960 Topps set.

Mains was inducted into the Murray State Athletic Hall of Fame in 1969. He was an inaugural member of the Mount Carmel High School Hall of Fame in 1982. In 1996, Mains was inducted into Wayne State University's athletics hall of fame as a contributor/builder for "his lifetime efforts in support of Tartar Football". He was a founder of the Tartar Gridiron Club in the 1980s. In 1994, Detroit mayor Dennis Archer said "but not for (Gil) Wayne State would not have a football team today and hundreds of young men would be looking to the streets instead of the field." Mains was inducted into the Kentucky Pro Football Hall of Fame in 2015. In 2025, he was an inaugural member of the Illinois Sports Hall of Fame.

== Professional wrestling career ==
Mains performed as a professional wrestler during two offseasons from 1955 to 1956. He reportedly wrestled 193 matches in total, including against Gorgeous George, Lord Athol Layton, and Whipper Billy Watson. He wrestled in Toronto for promoter Frank Tunney and was trained by Whipper Billy Watson. Mains also wrestled in Seattle, Washington, and New York. He later said he made more money wrestling Gorgeous George for two weeks than he did his entire rookie year in the NFL. Mains quit pro wrestling due to the travel; he said wrestling forced him to be away from home five or six days a week. He refereed some matches as well. Mains had one trading card produced of him during his pro wrestling career; card No. 104 in the 1955–56 Parkhurst set. His Parkhurst card said that he excelled in flying tackles.

== Post-playing career ==
Mains joined the Lions as a part-time scout for the 1962 season. In 1964, he bought an abandoned bus terminal in Detroit for $550,000. He also continued on as an insurance salesman after his NFL career. In 1965, he reportedly sold $1 million worth of insurance policies. The same year, he was one of 81 Michigan supporters of Jimmy Hoffa's defense fund. Mains continued purchasing land adjacent to the original bus terminal he bought. By 1966, he owned 36 acres with plans to start Gil Mains Truck City, Inc., which would include room for over 1,000 trucks, more than 50 stores, and a ski lift to take truckers from their vehicle to the terminal. Mains's grand plans for the trucking company never came to fruition though as, in 1969, Gil Mains Truck City, Inc., was placed in an operating receivership by the U.S. Bankruptcy Court. In 1970, Mains and others involved in Gil Mains Truck City were accused of diverting a multimillion dollar loan from the Teamsters Union pension fund to buy stock in the Warren Bank. Truck City was still in operation through the 1980s, although under different ownership and not as big as Mains had envisioned.

By 1974, Mains was a salesman for Micro Optics and sold Sparcraft lights. He sued Sparcraft after he was apparently denied some commissions. The lawsuit was dismissed. Mains was also involved in selling commercial real estate. He was a Shriner and helped promote the final North–South Shrine Game in 1976. In 1979, Mains became president of the Detroit Lions Alumni Association. In the 1980s, he was in charge of Great Lakes Industrial Contracting, which made pressure vessels and had 300 employees. He was also owner of Glic Environmental in Toledo, Ohio. Future NFL player Roosevelt Nix worked at Glic Environmental. In the 1990s, Mains became the chairman of the Toledo-based RMF Global, an industrial services company.

== Personal life ==
In July 1960, Mains tackled someone who was stealing his neighbor's gas. In January 1962, Mains said that he and hockey player Howie Young were beaten up at a bar by "four or five men". Mains claimed he did not know what caused the brawl. He said a man named Mitchell Massu approached him and said "Do you want to make something out of it?", after which Mains replied "Make something out of what?" Massu then tried to hit Mains and a free-for-all broke out. Mains suffered various minor injuries and Young was also injured after trying to help Mains.

In 1963, Mains sued the Lions, the team doctor, and a hospital for improper treatment of his career-ending knee injury. However, the lawsuit never went to court. He had knee replacement surgery in 1981, receiving a metal knee. Later that year, he was hit by a car, breaking his leg in 35 places. This made Mains's leg two inches shorter. As a result, he started wearing a "built-up heel".

Mains was a Shriner, a Freemason, and a member of The Elks. His nephew, David Mains, also played college football at Murray State in the 1970s. In 1983, Mains, his wife Delores, and their three children were all hospitalised due to food poisoning after eating contaminated eggs at the Detroit Grand Prix. In 1993, Mains was honored by the Michigan House of Representatives for his involvement in the Hands That Help charity organization. Mains died on January 10, 2009, in West Branch, Michigan, leaving behind his wife Delores and four children.

== See also ==
- List of gridiron football players who became professional wrestlers
