= Electoral history of Franklin D. Roosevelt =

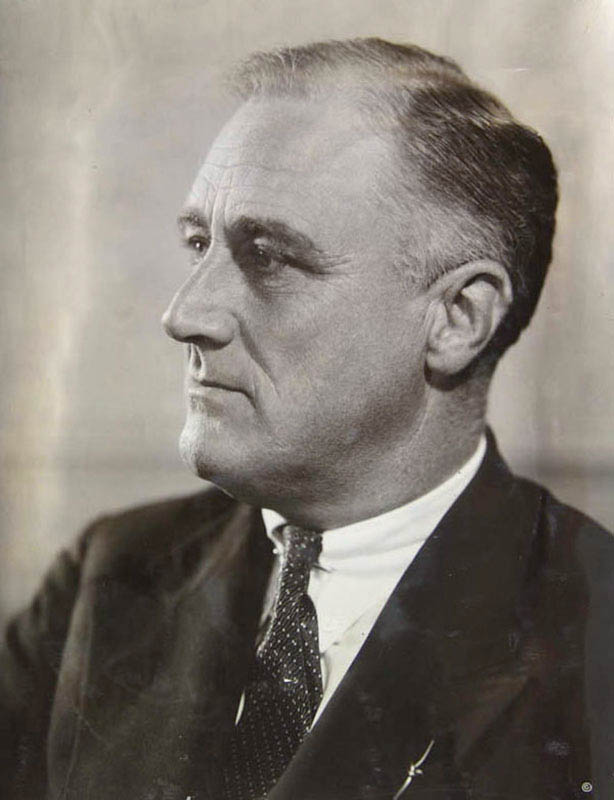
Franklin D. Roosevelt, 1932

Franklin D. Roosevelt served as the 32nd president of the United States (1933–1945) and the 44th governor of New York (1929–1932).

A member of the Democratic Party, Roosevelt was first elected to the New York State Senate in 1910, representing the 26th district. He won re-election in 1912 before resigning shortly after starting his second term to accept the position of Assistant Secretary of the Navy under President Woodrow Wilson. He served throughout World War I, then resigned in 1920 to run for vice president of the United States as a part of James M. Cox's campaign. They would lose in a landslide to the Republican ticket of Warren G. Harding and Calvin Coolidge. After a break from electoral politics following his polio diagnosis, Roosevelt made his political comeback when he was narrowly elected Governor of New York in the 1928 election. His popularity as a result of his handling of the Great Depression in the state allowed him to win re-election by a much wider margin in 1930.

Roosevelt re-entered national politics when he announced his bid for the presidency in the 1932 election. After securing the Democratic nomination, he unseated incumbent president Herbert Hoover, becoming the first Democrat to win an outright majority of the popular vote since Samuel J. Tilden in 1876 and effectively jumpstarting the Fifth Party System. His re-election in 1936 was the greatest electoral landslide since the largely uncontested 1820 election, receiving the highest percentage of the electoral vote won by any candidate since then. He became the first and only president to win an unprecedented third and fourth terms in 1940 and 1944, in which he continued to enjoy relatively comfortable margins of victory due to his favorable handling of World War II and the persisting popularity of the New Deal. Roosevelt would die in office less than three months into his fourth term, being succeeded by Vice President Harry S. Truman.

== New York State Senate elections (1910–1912) ==
=== 1910 ===
1910 New York's 26th State Senate district election
Party	Candidate	Votes	%	±%
Democratic	Franklin D. Roosevelt	15,708	51.88	+5.99
Republican	John F. Schlosser (incumbent)	14,568	48.12	−3.61
Total votes		30,276	100.00	
Democratic gain from Republican				

=== 1912 ===
1912 New York's 26th State Senate district election
Party	Candidate	Votes	%	±%
Democratic	Franklin D. Roosevelt (incumbent)	15,590	48.45	−3.43
Republican	Jacob G. Southard	13,959	43.38	−4.74
Progressive	George A. Vossler	2,628	8.17	N/A
Total votes		32,177	100.00	
Democratic hold				

== United States Senate election (1914) ==
=== Primary election ===
1914 United States Senate election in New York, Democratic primary
Party	Candidate	Votes	%
Democratic	James W. Gerard	133,815	62.08
Democratic	Franklin D. Roosevelt	63,879	29.64
Democratic	James S. McDonough	17,862	8.29
Total votes		215,556	100.00

== Vice presidential campaign (1920) ==
=== Nomination ===
1920 Democratic National Convention, vice presidential tally
Candidate	Votes	%
Franklin D. Roosevelt	1,094	100.00
Total votes	1,094	100.00

=== General election ===
Electoral College map of the 1920 presidential election

1920 United States presidential election
Candidate	Running mate	Party	Popular vote		Electoral vote	
Candidate	Running mate	Party	Votes	%	Votes	%
Warren G. Harding	Calvin Coolidge	Republican	16,144,093	60.32	404	76.08
James M. Cox	Franklin D. Roosevelt	Democratic	9,139,661	34.15	127	23.92
Eugene V. Debs	Seymour Stedman	Socialist	913,693	3.41		
Parley P. Christensen	Max S. Hayes	Farmer–Labor	265,398	0.99		
Aaron S. Watkins	D. Leigh Colvin	Prohibition	188,787	0.71		
James E. Ferguson	William J. Hough	American	47,968	0.18		
William Wesley Cox	August Gillhaus	Socialist Labor	31,084	0.12		
Others			34,496	0.13		
Total			26,765,180	100.00	531	100.00
Source: Dave Leip's Atlas of U.S. Presidential Elections

== New York gubernatorial elections (1928–1930) ==
=== 1928 ===
County results of the 1928 gubernatorial election

1928 New York gubernatorial election
Party	Candidate	Votes	%	±%
Democratic	Franklin D. Roosevelt	2,130,193	48.96	−3.34
Republican	Albert Ottinger	2,104,129	48.36	+4.56
Socialist	Louis Waldman	101,859	2.34	−0.53
Workers	William F. Dunne	10,741	0.25	+0.06
Socialist Labor	Charles Hunter Corregan	4,213	0.10	−0.02
Total votes		4,351,135	100.00	
Democratic hold				

=== 1930 ===
County results of the 1930 gubernatorial election

1930 New York gubernatorial election
Party	Candidate	Votes	%	±%
Democratic	Franklin D. Roosevelt (incumbent)	1,770,342	56.13	+7.18
Republican	Charles H. Tuttle	1,045,341	33.14	−15.22
Law Preservation	Robert P. Carroll	190,666	6.05	N/A
Socialist	Louis Waldman	120,444	3.82	+1.48
Communist	William Z. Foster	18,034	0.57	N/A
Socialist Labor	Jeremiah D. Crowley	9,096	0.29	+0.19
Total votes		3,153,923	100.00	
Democratic hold				

== Presidential elections (1932–1944) ==
=== 1932 ===
==== Primary elections ====
First-instance vote by state and territory Roosevelt Smith Garner Favorite sons

1932 Democratic Party presidential primaries
Candidate	Votes	%
Franklin D. Roosevelt	1,464,607	49.44
J. Hamilton Lewis	590,130	19.92
Al Smith	415,795	14.04
John Nance Garner	249,816	8.43
William H. Murray	226,392	7.64
Leo J. Chassee	7,372	0.25
Gus H. Howard	5,541	0.19
Others	2,972	0.10
Total votes	2,962,625	100.00

==== Nomination ====
First place by convention roll call (first round) Roosevelt Smith Garner Favorite sons

1932 Democratic National Convention, presidential tally
Candidate	Ballot			
Candidate	1st	2nd	3rd	4th
Franklin D. Roosevelt	666.25	677.75	682.75	945
Al Smith	201.75	194.25	190.25	190.25
John Nance Garner	90.25	90.25	101.25	
Albert Ritchie	21	23.5	23.5	3.5
George White	52	50.5	52.5	3
Melvin Alvah Traylor	42.25	40.25	40.25	
James A. Reed	24	18	27.5	
Harry F. Byrd	25	24	25	
Will Rogers		22		
William H. Murray	23			
Newton D. Baker	8.5	8	8.5	5.5
James M. Cox				1
Not voting		5.5	2.5	5.75

==== General election ====
Electoral College map of the 1932 presidential election

1932 United States presidential election
Candidate	Running mate	Party	Popular vote		Electoral vote	
Candidate	Running mate	Party	Votes	%	Votes	%
Franklin D. Roosevelt	John Nance Garner	Democratic	22,821,277	57.41	472	88.89
Herbert Hoover (inc.)	Charles Curtis (inc.)	Republican	15,761,254	39.65	59	11.11
Norman Thomas	James H. Maurer	Socialist	884,885	2.23		
William Z. Foster	James W. Ford	Communist	103,307	0.26		
William David Upshaw	Frank S. Regan	Prohibition	81,905	0.21		
William Hope Harvey	Frank Hemenway	Liberty	53,425	0.13		
Others			45,845	0.12		
Total			39,751,898	100.00	531	100.00
Source: Dave Leip's Atlas of U.S. Presidential Elections

=== 1936 ===
==== Primary elections ====
1936 Democratic Party presidential primaries
Candidate	Votes	%
Franklin D. Roosevelt (incumbent)	4,830,730	93.19
Henry Skillman Breckinridge	136,407	2.63
Upton Sinclair	106,068	2.05
John S. McGroarty	61,391	1.18
Joseph A. Coutremarsh	39,730	0.77
Others	9,329	0.18
Total votes	5,183,655	100.00

==== Nomination ====
1936 Democratic National Convention, presidential tally
Candidate	Votes	%
Franklin D. Roosevelt (incumbent)	(Note: Chosen by acclamation.)–	100.00
Total votes	–	100.00

==== General election ====
Electoral College map of the 1936 presidential election

1936 United States presidential election
Candidate	Running mate	Party	Popular vote		Electoral vote	
Candidate	Running mate	Party	Votes	%	Votes	%
Franklin D. Roosevelt (inc.)	John Nance Garner (inc.)	Democratic	27,752,648	60.80	523	98.49
Alf Landon	Frank Knox	Republican	16,681,862	36.54	8	1.51
William Lemke	Thomas C. O'Brien	Union	892,378	1.95		
Norman Thomas	George A. Nelson	Socialist	187,910	0.41		
Earl Browder	James W. Ford	Communist	79,315	0.17		
Others			53,586	0.12		
Total			45,647,699	100.00	531	100.00
Source: Dave Leip's Atlas of U.S. Presidential Elections

=== 1940 ===
==== Primary elections ====
1940 Democratic Party presidential primaries
Candidate	Votes	%
Franklin D. Roosevelt (incumbent)	3,250,555	72.16
John Nance Garner	426,641	9.47
Charles W. Sawyer	283,952	6.30
William B. Bankhead	196,508	4.36
H. C. Allen	102,729	2.28
Willis Allen	90,718	2.01
James Farley	76,919	1.71
Ellis E. Patterson	48,337	1.07
Unpledged	27,636	0.61
Others	636	0.01
Total votes	4,504,631	100.00

==== Nomination ====
First place by convention roll call

1940 Democratic National Convention, presidential tally
Candidate	Votes	%
Franklin D. Roosevelt (incumbent)	946	86.32
James Farley	72	6.57
John Nance Garner	61	5.57
Millard Tydings	9	0.82
Cordell Hull	5	0.47
Total votes	1,093	100.00

==== General election ====
Electoral College map of the 1940 presidential election

1940 United States presidential election
Candidate	Running mate	Party	Popular vote		Electoral vote	
Candidate	Running mate	Party	Votes	%	Votes	%
Franklin D. Roosevelt (inc.)	Henry A. Wallace	Democratic	27,313,945	54.74	449	84.56
Wendell Willkie	Charles L. McNary	Republican	22,347,744	44.78	82	15.44
Norman Thomas	Maynard C. Krueger	Socialist	116,599	0.23		
Roger Babson	Edgar Moorman	Prohibition	57,903	0.12		
Earl Browder	James W. Ford	Communist	48,557	0.10		
Others			17,365	0.03		
Total			49,902,113	100.00	531	100.00
Source: Dave Leip's Atlas of U.S. Presidential Elections

=== 1944 ===
==== Primary elections ====
1944 Democratic Party presidential primaries
Candidate	Votes	%
Franklin D. Roosevelt (incumbent)	1,566,218	79.24
Joseph T. Ferguson	164,915	8.34
Harry F. Byrd	109,000	5.51
Claude R. Linger	59,282	3.00
Unpledged	57,299	2.90
Fred H. Hildebrandt	7,414	0.38
A. W. Powell	6,727	0.34
Others	5,754	0.29
Total votes	1,976,609	100.00

==== Nomination ====
1944 Democratic National Convention, presidential tally
Candidate	Votes	%
Franklin D. Roosevelt (incumbent)	1,086	92.35
Harry F. Byrd	89	7.56
James Farley	1	0.09
Total votes	1,176	100.00

==== General election ====
Electoral College map of the 1944 presidential election

1944 United States presidential election
Candidate	Running mate	Party	Popular vote		Electoral vote	
Candidate	Running mate	Party	Votes	%	Votes	%
Franklin D. Roosevelt (inc.)	Harry S. Truman	Democratic	25,612,916	53.38	432	81.36
Thomas E. Dewey	John W. Bricker	Republican	22,017,929	45.89	99	18.64
Unpledged	Unpledged	Texas Regulars	143,238	0.30		
Norman Thomas	Darlington Hoopes	Socialist	79,017	0.16		
Claude A. Watson	Andrew N. Johnson	Prohibition	74,758	0.16		
Others			57,004	0.12		
Total			47,984,862	100.00	531	100.00
Source: Dave Leip's Atlas of U.S. Presidential Elections
