= Wabash Community Unit School District 348 =

School district in Illinois, United States

Wabash Community Unit School District 348 is a school district headquartered in Mount Carmel, Illinois. The district includes the vast majority of the county, and has Mount Carmel, Bellmont, and Keensburg. The consolidation of rural school districts into larger community units, such as Wabash CUSD 348, has been a common strategy in Illinois to manage resources more efficiently and address population decline.

== History ==
Tim Buss was superintendent until June 30, 2018, due to retirement. Chuck Bleyer became the new superintendent. Dr. Chuck Bleyer received his Doctor of Education from McKendree University in the year prior to his appointment as Superintendent.

The district changed operations in 2020 during the COVID-19 pandemic in Illinois. The district planned to resume regular operations for the 2021–2022 school year, but masks were made optional for students.

== Schools ==
- Mt. Carmel High School
- Mt. Carmel Junior High School
- Mt. Carmel Elementary School
- Mt. Carmel Grade School
