= 1964 United States presidential election in Illinois =

- November 3, 1964
- Turnout: 84.97%

| Nominee | Lyndon B. Johnson | Barry Goldwater |
| Party | Democratic | Republican |
| Home state | Texas | Arizona |
| Running mate | Hubert Humphrey | William E. Miller |
| Electoral vote | 26 | 0 |
| Popular vote | 2,796,833 | 1,905,946 |
| Percentage | 59.47% | 40.53% |
County results
Johnson
50–60%
60–70%
70–80%
Goldwater
50–60%
60–70%
President before election
Lyndon B. Johnson
Democratic
Elected President
Lyndon B. Johnson
Democratic

The 1964 United States presidential election in Illinois took place on November 3, 1964, as part of the 1964 United States presidential election. State voters chose 26 representatives, or electors, to the Electoral College, who voted for president and vice president.

Illinois was won by incumbent President Lyndon B. Johnson (D–Texas), with 59.47% of the popular vote, against Senator Barry Goldwater (R–Arizona), with 40.53% of the popular vote. As of the 2024 presidential election, this is the last election in which Adams County, DeWitt County, Effingham County, Logan County, Menard County, Morgan County, Scott County, Wabash County, and Wayne County voted for a Democratic presidential candidate.

This was the last time until 1992 that Illinois voted Democratic in a presidential race, after which the state has always gone Democratic. McLean County would not vote Democratic again until 2008.

== Primaries ==
=== Turnout ===
Turnout in the preference vote of the primaries was 17.77%, with a total of 917,314 votes cast.

Turnout in the general election was 84.97%, with a total of 4,702,841 votes cast. Both major parties held non-binding state-run preferential primaries on April 14.

=== Democratic ===
1964 Illinois Democratic presidential primary
- April 14, 1964
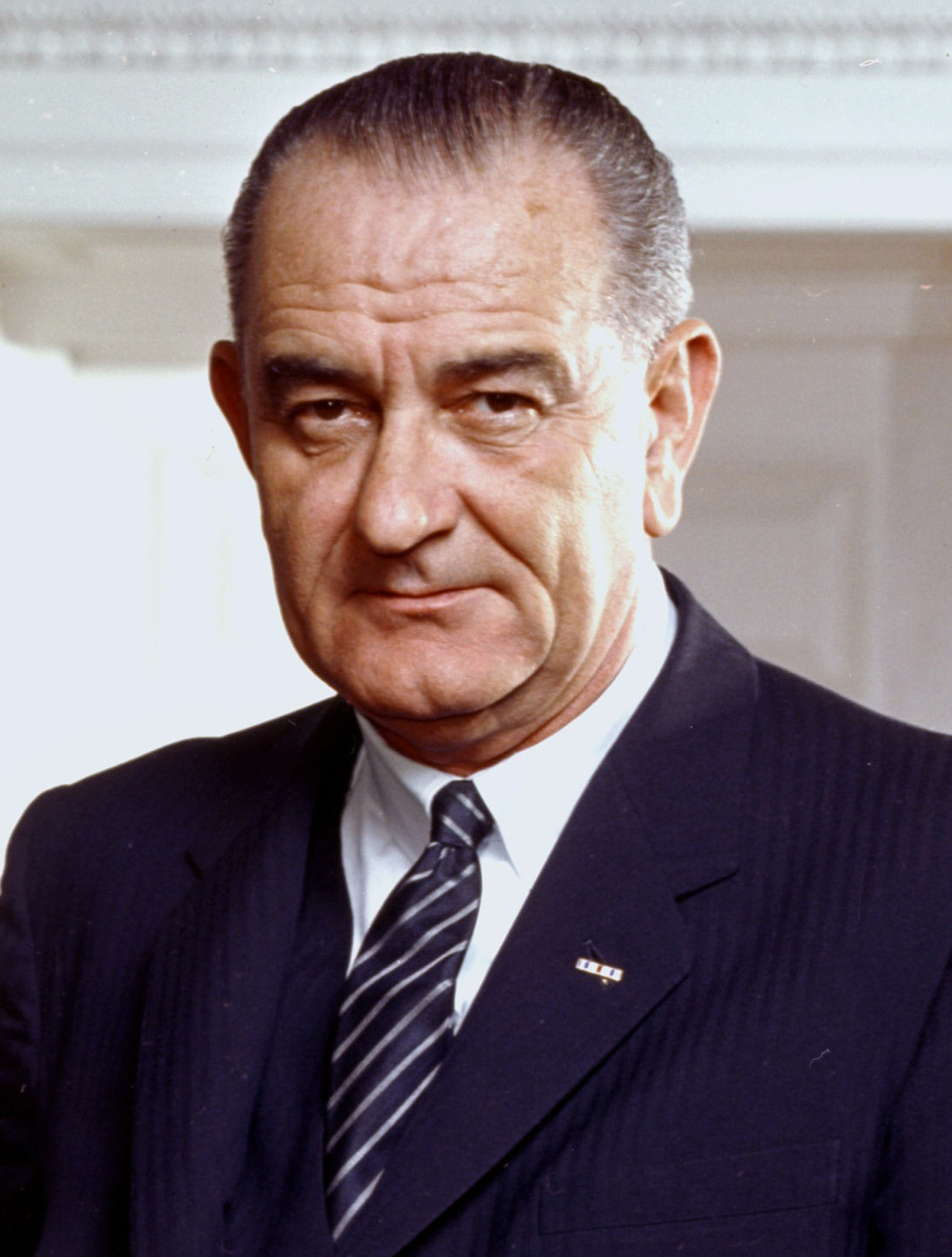

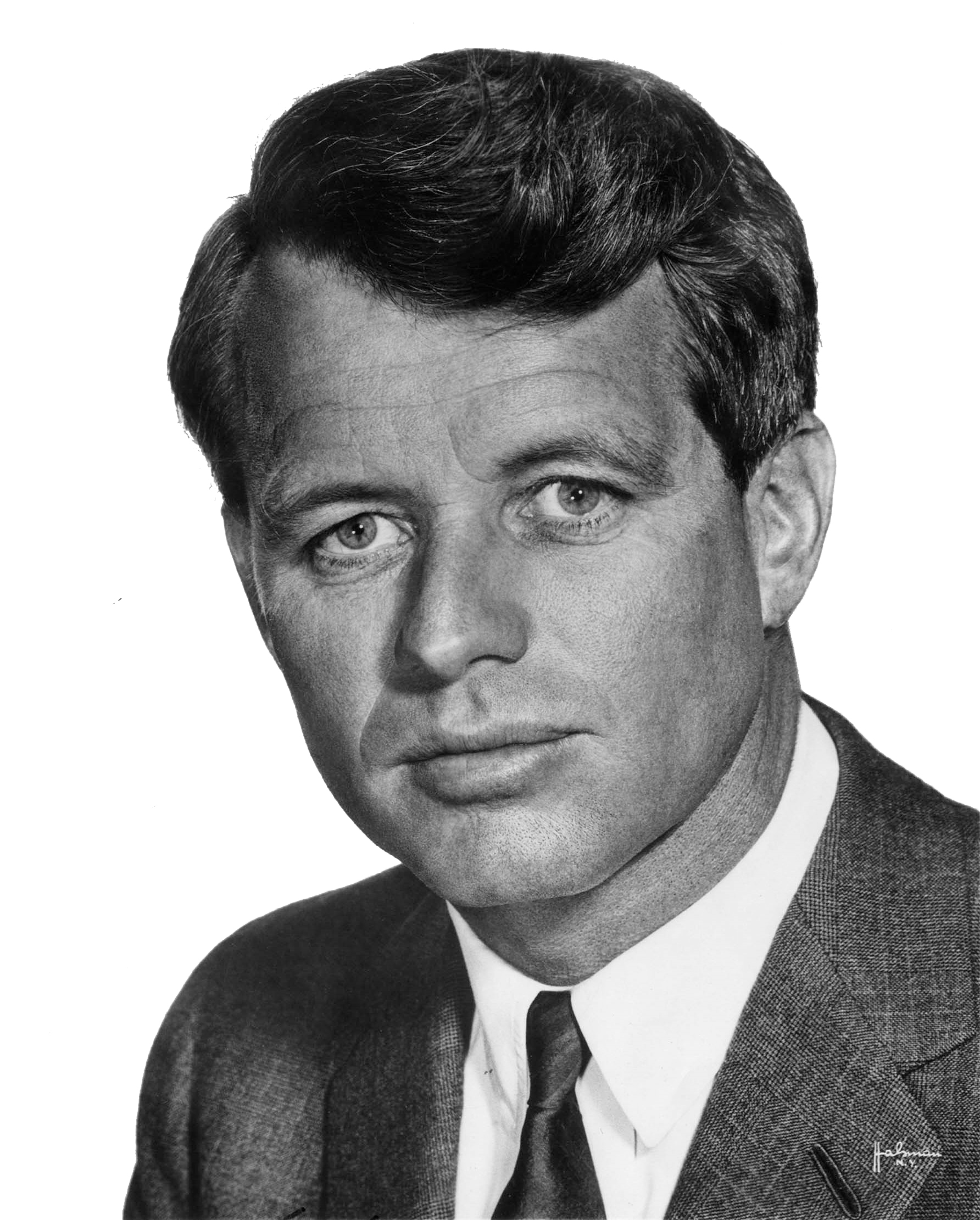
| Candidate | Lyndon B. Johnson | George Wallace (write-in) | Robert F. Kennedy (write-in) |
| Home state | Texas | Alabama | Massachusetts |
| Popular vote | 82,027 | 3,761 | 2,894 |
| Percentage | 91.63% | 4.20% | 3.23% |

The 1964 Illinois Democratic presidential primary was held on April 14, 1964, in the U.S. state of Illinois as one of the Democratic Party's state primaries ahead of the 1964 presidential election.

In this election, all candidates were write-ins.

The preference vote was a "beauty contest". Delegates were instead selected by direct-vote in each congressional districts on delegate candidates.

Incumbent president Lyndon B. Johnson overwhelmingly won the primary.

While he received 3.23% of the vote, Robert F. Kennedy was not an active candidate for the nomination.

1964 Illinois Democratic presidential primary
| Candidate | Votes | % |
|---|---|---|
| Lyndon B. Johnson (incumbent) (write-in) | 82,027 | 91.63 |
| George Wallace (write-in) | 3,761 | 4.20 |
| Robert F. Kennedy (write-in) | 2,894 | 3.23 |
| Other write-ins | 841 | 0.94 |
| Total | 89,523 | 100 |

=== Republican ===
1964 Illinois Republican presidential primary
- April 14, 1964
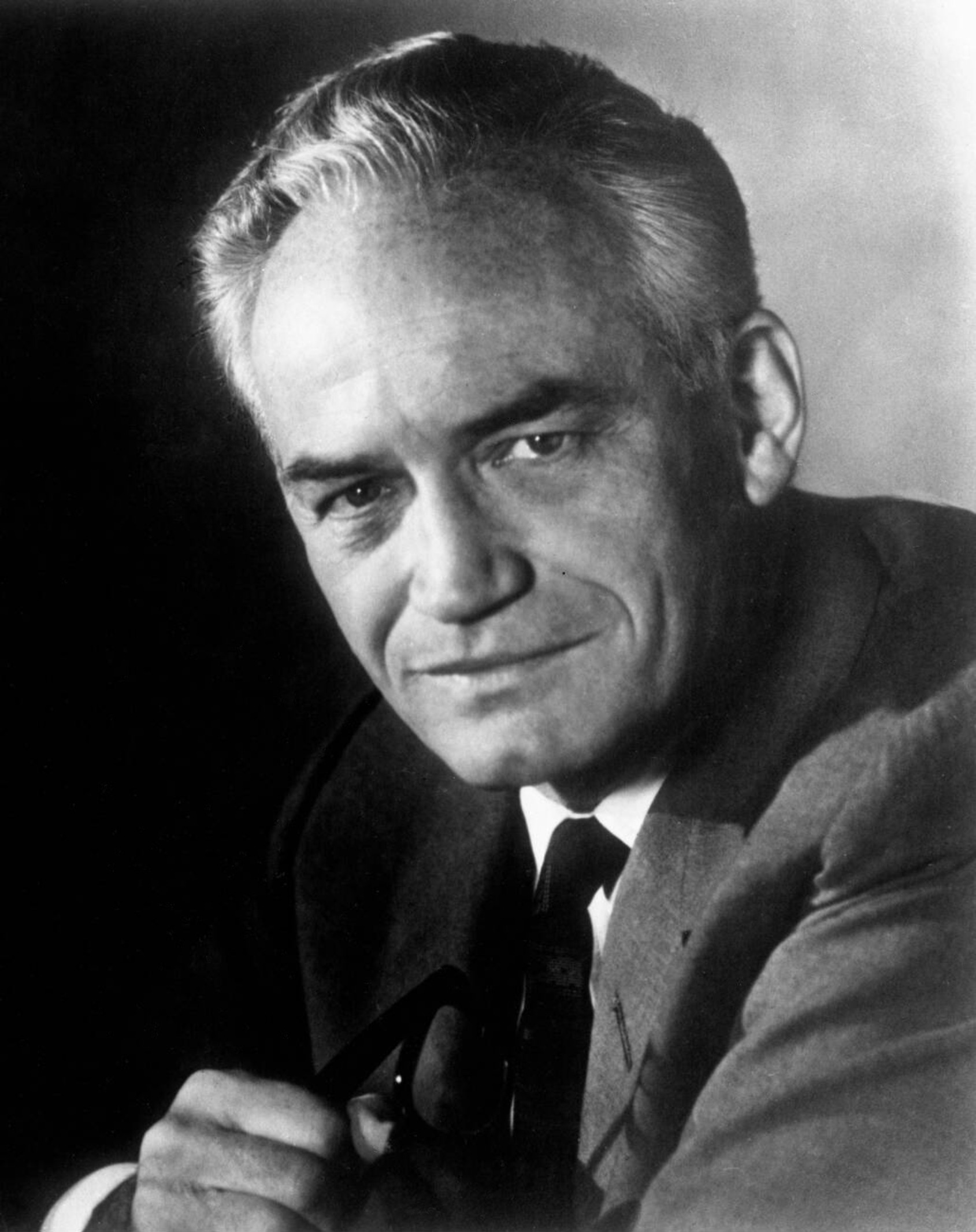

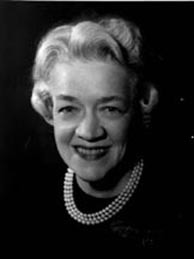

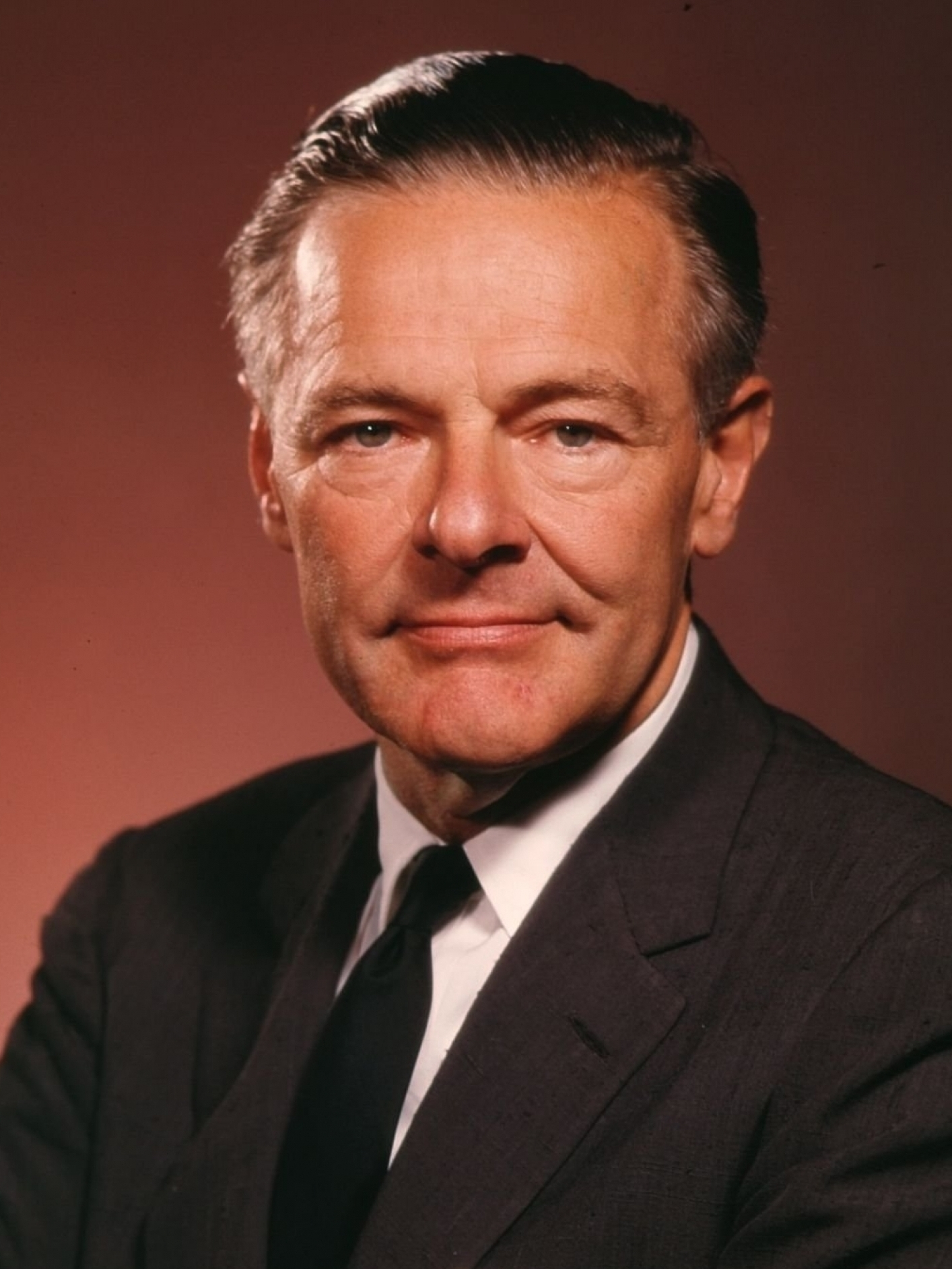
| Candidate | Barry Goldwater | Margaret Chase Smith | Henry Cabot Lodge Jr. |
| Home state | Arizona | Maine | Massachusetts |
| Popular vote | 512,840 | 209,521 | 68,122 |
| Percentage | 61.95% | 25.31% | 8.23% |
- County map legend: Goldwater—40-50% Goldwater—50-60% Goldwater—60-70% Goldwater—70-80% Goldwater—80-90%

The 1964 Illinois Republican presidential primary was held on April 14, 1964, in the U.S. state of Illinois as one of the Republican Party's state primaries ahead of the 1964 presidential election.

The preference vote was a "beauty contest". Delegates were instead selected by direct-vote in each congressional districts on delegate candidates.

1964 Illinois Republican presidential primary
| Candidate | Votes | % |
|---|---|---|
| Barry M. Goldwater | 512,840 | 61.95 |
| Margaret Chase Smith | 209,521 | 25.31 |
| Henry Cabot Lodge Jr. (write-in) | 68,122 | 8.23 |
| Richard M. Nixon (write-in) | 30,313 | 3.66 |
| George Wallace (write-in) | 2,203 | 0.27 |
| Nelson A. Rockefeller (write-in) | 2,048 | 0.25 |
| William Scranton (write-in) | 1,842 | 0.22 |
| George Romney (write-in) | 465 | 0.06 |
| Other write-ins | 437 | 0.05 |
| Total | 827,791 | 100 |

== Results ==
1964 United States presidential election in Illinois
| Party | Candidate | Votes | % |
|---|---|---|---|
| Democratic | Lyndon B. Johnson (inc.) | 2,796,833 | 59.47% |
| Republican | Barry Goldwater | 1,905,946 | 40.53% |
| Write-in | Others | 62 | 0.00% |
| Total votes | | 4,702,841 | 100% |

=== Results by county ===
| County | Lyndon B. Johnson Democratic | | Barry Goldwater Republican | | Various candidates Write-ins | | Margin | | Total votes cast |
| County | # | % | # | % | # | % | # | % | Total votes cast |
|---|---|---|---|---|---|---|---|---|---|
| Adams | 18,321 | 56.70% | 13,993 | 43.30% | | | 4,328 | 13.40% | 32,314 |
| Alexander | 4,763 | 62.20% | 2,895 | 37.80% | | | 1,868 | 24.40% | 7,658 |
| Bond | 3,815 | 55.51% | 3,058 | 44.49% | | | 757 | 11.02% | 6,873 |
| Boone | 3,694 | 42.23% | 5,053 | 57.77% | | | -1,359 | -15.54% | 8,747 |
| Brown | 2,083 | 60.59% | 1,355 | 39.41% | | | 728 | 21.18% | 3,438 |
| Bureau | 9,086 | 48.75% | 9,552 | 51.25% | | | -466 | -2.50% | 18,638 |
| Calhoun | 1,805 | 58.36% | 1,288 | 41.64% | | | 517 | 16.72% | 3,093 |
| Carroll | 4,062 | 47.51% | 4,487 | 52.49% | | | -425 | -4.98% | 8,549 |
| Cass | 4,424 | 60.94% | 2,836 | 39.06% | | | 1,588 | 21.88% | 7,260 |
| Champaign | 25,792 | 53.96% | 22,010 | 46.04% | | | 3,782 | 7.92% | 47,802 |
| Christian | 11,898 | 65.91% | 6,153 | 34.09% | | | 5,745 | 31.82% | 18,051 |
| Clark | 4,464 | 50.34% | 4,403 | 49.66% | | | 61 | 0.68% | 8,867 |
| Clay | 4,551 | 55.39% | 3,665 | 44.61% | | | 886 | 10.78% | 8,216 |
| Clinton | 7,339 | 61.00% | 4,692 | 39.00% | | | 2,647 | 22.00% | 12,031 |
| Coles | 11,377 | 56.17% | 8,878 | 43.83% | | | 2,499 | 12.34% | 20,255 |
| Cook | 1,537,181 | 63.18% | 895,718 | 36.82% | | | 641,463 | 26.36% | 2,432,899 |
| Crawford | 5,624 | 53.78% | 4,834 | 46.22% | | | 790 | 7.56% | 10,458 |
| Cumberland | 3,056 | 57.58% | 2,251 | 42.42% | | | 805 | 15.16% | 5,307 |
| DeKalb | 10,257 | 46.52% | 11,791 | 53.48% | 1 | 0.00% | -1,534 | -6.96% | 22,049 |
| DeWitt | 4,371 | 54.80% | 3,605 | 45.20% | | | 766 | 9.60% | 7,976 |
| Douglas | 4,695 | 52.65% | 4,223 | 47.35% | | | 472 | 5.30% | 8,918 |
| DuPage | 66,229 | 40.11% | 98,871 | 59.89% | | | -32,642 | -19.78% | 165,100 |
| Edgar | 5,966 | 50.59% | 5,827 | 49.41% | | | 139 | 1.18% | 11,793 |
| Edwards | 1,991 | 46.81% | 2,262 | 53.19% | | | -271 | -6.38% | 4,253 |
| Effingham | 6,782 | 57.35% | 5,044 | 42.65% | | | 1,738 | 14.70% | 11,826 |
| Fayette | 6,295 | 58.36% | 4,492 | 41.64% | | | 1,803 | 16.72% | 10,787 |
| Ford | 3,427 | 42.43% | 4,650 | 57.57% | | | -1,223 | -15.14% | 8,077 |
| Franklin | 13,581 | 64.06% | 7,620 | 35.94% | | | 5,961 | 28.12% | 21,201 |
| Fulton | 13,030 | 62.60% | 7,785 | 37.40% | | | 5,245 | 25.20% | 20,815 |
| Gallatin | 2,845 | 67.11% | 1,394 | 32.89% | | | 1,451 | 34.22% | 4,239 |
| Greene | 4,781 | 60.45% | 3,128 | 39.55% | | | 1,653 | 20.90% | 7,909 |
| Grundy | 5,246 | 48.72% | 5,522 | 51.28% | | | -276 | -2.56% | 10,768 |
| Hamilton | 3,133 | 55.02% | 2,561 | 44.98% | | | 572 | 10.04% | 5,694 |
| Hancock | 6,199 | 52.73% | 5,557 | 47.27% | | | 642 | 5.46% | 11,756 |
| Hardin | 1,639 | 55.32% | 1,324 | 44.68% | | | 315 | 10.64% | 2,963 |
| Henderson | 2,271 | 54.93% | 1,863 | 45.07% | | | 408 | 9.86% | 4,134 |
| Henry | 12,085 | 53.17% | 10,644 | 46.83% | | | 1,441 | 6.34% | 22,729 |
| Iroquois | 7,029 | 42.72% | 9,423 | 57.28% | | | -2,394 | -14.56% | 16,452 |
| Jackson | 12,165 | 63.43% | 7,013 | 36.57% | | | 5,152 | 26.86% | 19,178 |
| Jasper | 3,406 | 56.58% | 2,614 | 43.42% | | | 792 | 13.16% | 6,020 |
| Jefferson | 9,653 | 60.71% | 6,248 | 39.29% | | | 3,405 | 21.42% | 15,901 |
| Jersey | 3,936 | 56.41% | 3,041 | 43.59% | | | 895 | 12.82% | 6,977 |
| Jo Daviess | 4,818 | 51.12% | 4,607 | 48.88% | | | 211 | 2.24% | 9,425 |
| Johnson | 1,770 | 44.39% | 2,217 | 55.61% | | | -447 | -11.22% | 3,987 |
| Kane | 40,703 | 46.73% | 46,391 | 53.27% | | | -5,688 | -6.54% | 87,094 |
| Kankakee | 20,792 | 56.39% | 16,082 | 43.61% | | | 4,710 | 12.78% | 36,874 |
| Kendall | 3,430 | 37.53% | 5,710 | 62.47% | | | -2,280 | -24.94% | 9,140 |
| Knox | 15,000 | 53.86% | 12,850 | 46.14% | | | 2,150 | 7.72% | 27,850 |
| Lake | 62,785 | 51.60% | 58,840 | 48.36% | 42 | 0.03% | 3,945 | 3.24% | 121,667 |
| LaSalle | 30,923 | 59.31% | 21,216 | 40.69% | | | 9,707 | 18.62% | 52,139 |
| Lawrence | 5,136 | 55.15% | 4,176 | 44.85% | | | 960 | 10.30% | 9,312 |
| Lee | 7,315 | 46.41% | 8,445 | 53.59% | | | -1,130 | -7.18% | 15,760 |
| Livingston | 8,476 | 45.29% | 10,239 | 54.71% | | | -1,763 | -9.42% | 18,715 |
| Logan | 7,712 | 53.12% | 6,805 | 46.88% | | | 907 | 6.24% | 14,517 |
| Macon | 35,045 | 66.12% | 17,957 | 33.88% | | | 17,088 | 32.24% | 53,002 |
| Macoupin | 15,227 | 64.37% | 8,430 | 35.63% | | | 6,797 | 28.74% | 23,657 |
| Madison | 65,115 | 68.45% | 30,009 | 31.55% | | | 35,106 | 36.90% | 95,124 |
| Marion | 12,363 | 63.65% | 7,060 | 36.35% | | | 5,303 | 27.30% | 19,423 |
| Marshall | 3,561 | 52.60% | 3,209 | 47.40% | | | 352 | 5.20% | 6,770 |
| Mason | 4,857 | 63.16% | 2,833 | 36.84% | | | 2,024 | 26.32% | 7,690 |
| Massac | 3,396 | 52.46% | 3,078 | 47.54% | | | 318 | 4.92% | 6,474 |
| McDonough | 6,144 | 47.08% | 6,907 | 52.92% | | | -763 | -5.84% | 13,051 |
| McHenry | 18,014 | 44.46% | 22,503 | 55.54% | | | -4,489 | -11.08% | 40,517 |
| McLean | 19,550 | 50.56% | 19,120 | 49.44% | | | 430 | 1.12% | 38,670 |
| Menard | 2,491 | 51.76% | 2,322 | 48.24% | | | 169 | 3.52% | 4,813 |
| Mercer | 4,410 | 51.10% | 4,220 | 48.90% | | | 190 | 2.20% | 8,630 |
| Monroe | 4,605 | 53.92% | 3,936 | 46.08% | | | 669 | 7.84% | 8,541 |
| Montgomery | 10,581 | 62.22% | 6,425 | 37.78% | | | 4,156 | 24.44% | 17,006 |
| Morgan | 9,235 | 56.05% | 7,240 | 43.95% | | | 1,995 | 12.10% | 16,475 |
| Moultrie | 3,733 | 59.96% | 2,493 | 40.04% | | | 1,240 | 19.92% | 6,226 |
| Ogle | 6,917 | 39.87% | 10,430 | 60.13% | | | -3,513 | -20.26% | 17,347 |
| Peoria | 47,360 | 58.70% | 33,327 | 41.30% | | | 14,033 | 17.40% | 80,687 |
| Perry | 6,639 | 60.76% | 4,287 | 39.24% | | | 2,352 | 21.52% | 10,926 |
| Piatt | 3,897 | 55.37% | 3,141 | 44.63% | | | 756 | 10.74% | 7,038 |
| Pike | 6,576 | 61.52% | 4,113 | 38.48% | | | 2,463 | 23.04% | 10,689 |
| Pope | 1,117 | 45.67% | 1,329 | 54.33% | | | -212 | -8.66% | 2,446 |
| Pulaski | 3,332 | 66.01% | 1,716 | 33.99% | | | 1,616 | 32.02% | 5,048 |
| Putnam | 1,359 | 54.58% | 1,131 | 45.42% | | | 228 | 9.16% | 2,490 |
| Randolph | 9,199 | 61.32% | 5,803 | 38.68% | | | 3,396 | 22.64% | 15,002 |
| Richland | 4,239 | 52.08% | 3,901 | 47.92% | | | 338 | 4.16% | 8,140 |
| Rock Island | 41,759 | 63.78% | 23,714 | 36.22% | | | 18,045 | 27.56% | 65,473 |
| Saline | 8,337 | 59.43% | 5,691 | 40.57% | | | 2,646 | 18.86% | 14,028 |
| Sangamon | 43,073 | 56.55% | 33,077 | 43.43% | 16 | 0.02% | 9,996 | 13.12% | 76,166 |
| Schuyler | 2,504 | 50.88% | 2,417 | 49.12% | | | 87 | 1.76% | 4,921 |
| Scott | 1,952 | 54.54% | 1,627 | 45.46% | | | 325 | 9.08% | 3,579 |
| Shelby | 7,088 | 62.34% | 4,281 | 37.66% | | | 2,807 | 24.68% | 11,369 |
| St. Clair | 74,005 | 72.39% | 28,226 | 27.61% | | | 45,779 | 44.78% | 102,231 |
| Stark | 1,776 | 45.62% | 2,117 | 54.38% | | | -341 | -8.76% | 3,893 |
| Stephenson | 10,854 | 53.98% | 9,252 | 46.02% | | | 1,602 | 7.96% | 20,106 |
| Tazewell | 28,561 | 62.45% | 17,170 | 37.55% | | | 11,391 | 24.90% | 45,731 |
| Union | 5,208 | 62.37% | 3,142 | 37.63% | | | 2,066 | 24.74% | 8,350 |
| Vermilion | 24,765 | 55.94% | 19,506 | 44.06% | | | 5,259 | 11.88% | 44,271 |
| Wabash | 3,721 | 56.16% | 2,905 | 43.84% | | | 816 | 12.32% | 6,626 |
| Warren | 4,670 | 47.02% | 5,258 | 52.95% | 3 | 0.03% | -588 | -5.93% | 9,931 |
| Washington | 3,670 | 48.87% | 3,840 | 51.13% | | | -170 | -2.26% | 7,510 |
| Wayne | 5,198 | 52.28% | 4,745 | 47.72% | | | 453 | 4.56% | 9,943 |
| White | 5,963 | 59.85% | 4,000 | 40.15% | | | 1,963 | 19.70% | 9,963 |
| Whiteside | 12,536 | 49.21% | 12,940 | 50.79% | | | -404 | -1.58% | 25,476 |
| Will | 49,663 | 56.25% | 38,619 | 43.75% | | | 11,044 | 12.50% | 88,282 |
| Williamson | 14,613 | 61.55% | 9,130 | 38.45% | | | 5,483 | 23.10% | 23,743 |
| Winnebago | 48,834 | 55.02% | 39,920 | 44.98% | | | 8,914 | 10.04% | 88,754 |
| Woodford | 5,914 | 48.63% | 6,248 | 51.37% | | | -334 | -2.74% | 12,162 |
| Totals | 2,796,833 | 59.47% | 1,905,946 | 40.53% | 62 | 0.00% | 890,887 | 18.94% | 4,702,841 |

==== Counties that flipped from Republican to Democratic ====
- Bond
- Cass
- Coles
- Fayette
- Franklin
- Fulton
- Greene
- Hamilton
- Hancock
- Hardin
- Jefferson
- Jersey
- Jo Daviess
- Kankakee
- Marion
- Marshall
- Mason
- Macon
- Moultrie
- Piatt
- Pike
- Pulaski
- Randolph
- Saline
- Schuyler
- Shelby
- Union
- Vermilion
- Will
- Williamson
- Winnebago
- Henry
- LaSalle
- Montgomery
- Perry
- Stephenson
- Adams
- Brown
- Cumberland
- Crawford
- DeWitt
- Douglas
- Edgar
- Logan
- Menard
- Mercer
- Monroe
- Morgan
- Peoria
- Putnam
- Sangamon
- Scott
- Tazewell
- Calhoun
- Henderson
- Knox
- Champaign
- Clark
- Clay
- Effingham
- Lake
- Lawrence
- Jackson
- Jasper
- Massac
- McLean
- Richland
- Wabash
- Wayne
- White

== See also ==
- United States presidential elections in Illinois
