= Cowling, Illinois =

- Unincorporated community
- Nickname: Cowville
- Location within Illinois Location within the United States
- Coordinates: 38°18′41″N 87°56′21″W
- Country: United States
- State: Illinois
- County: Wabash
- Elevation: 397 ft (121 m)
- Time zone: UTC-6 (Central (CST))
  - Summer (DST): UTC-5 (CDT)
- Area code: 618
- GNIS feature ID: 406684

Cowling is an unincorporated community in Wabash County, Illinois, United States. Cowling is located on Illinois Route 1, 5 miles (8.0 km) northeast of Grayville.
