= Keensburg, Illinois =

- Village
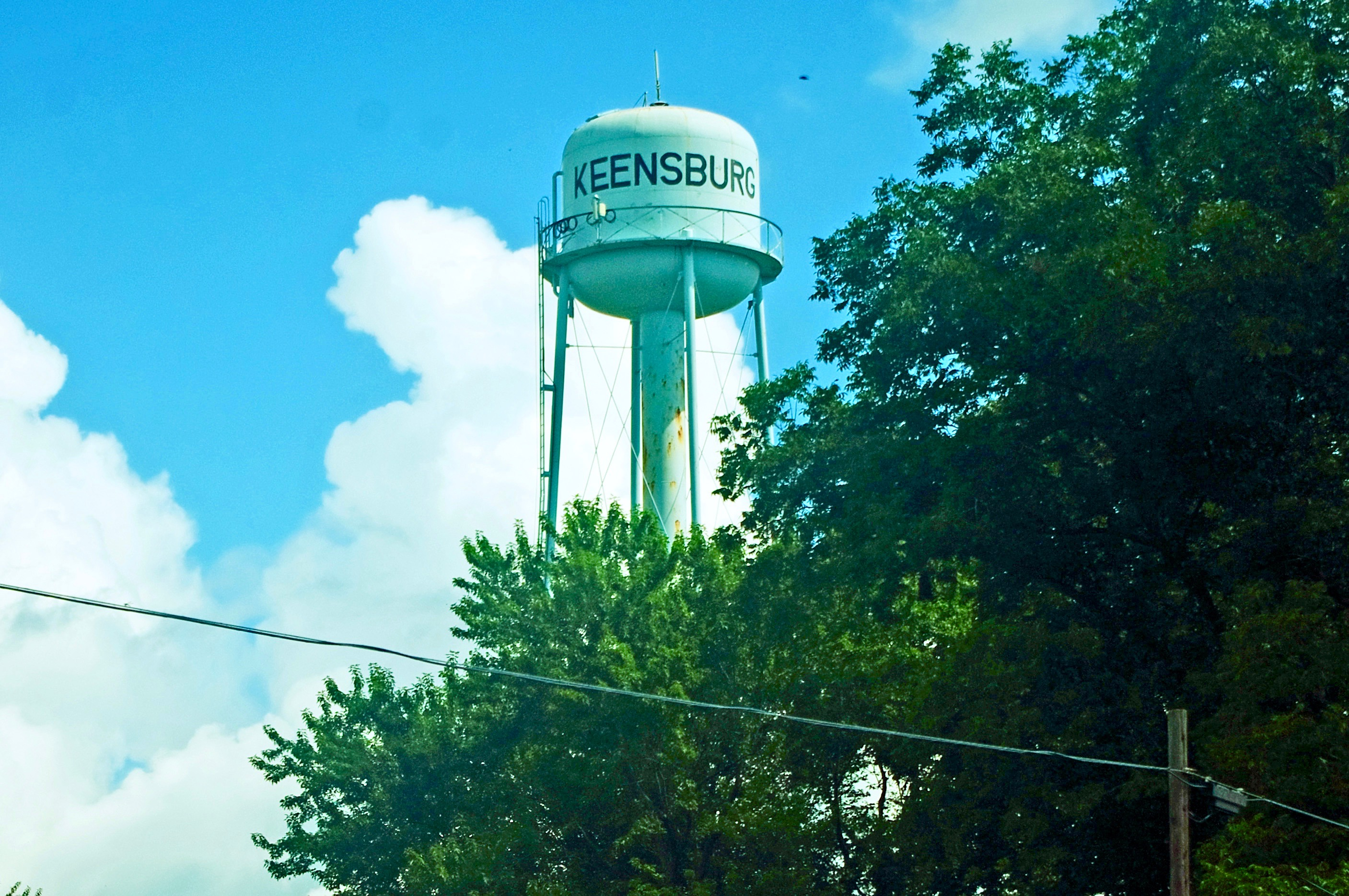
- Water tower

- Location of Keensburg in Wabash County, Illinois
- Coordinates: 38°21′07″N 87°52′06″W
- Country: United States
- State: Illinois
- County: Wabash
- Precinct: Coffee

Area
  - Total: 0.26 sq mi (0.67 km^{2})
  - Land: 0.26 sq mi (0.67 km^{2})
  - Water: 0 sq mi (0.00 km^{2})
- Elevation: 423 ft (129 m)

Population (2020)
  - Total: 174
  - Density: 669.0/sq mi (258.31/km^{2})
- Time zone: UTC-6 (CST)
  - Summer (DST): UTC-5 (CDT)
- ZIP code: 62852
- Area code: 618
- FIPS code: 17-39259
- GNIS feature ID: 2398332

Keensburg is a village in Coffee Precinct, Wabash County, Illinois. The population was 174 at the 2020 census.

== History ==
Keensburg was founded in the mid-1870s, and named for the Keen family.

== Geography ==
According to the 2010 census, Keensburg has a total area of 0.26 square miles (0.67 km^{2}), all land. Keensburg is connected to the nearby towns of Mount Carmel and Grayville by Illinois Route 1. The village lies just west of the Wabash River and Beall Woods State Park.

== Demographics ==
Historical population
Census	Pop.	Note	%±
1880	68		—
1910	405		—
1920	354		−12.6%
1930	320		−9.6%
1940	421		31.6%
1950	302		−28.3%
1960	263		−12.9%
1970	242		−8.0%
1980	244		0.8%
1990	238		−2.5%
2000	252		5.9%
2010	210		−16.7%
2020	174		−17.1%
U.S. Decennial Census

As of the census of 2000, there were 252 people, 102 households, and 73 families residing in the village. The population density was 978.6 inhabitants per square mile (377.8/km^{2}). There were 111 housing units at an average density of 431.0 per square mile (166.4/km^{2}). The racial makeup of the village was 99.21% White, and 0.79% from two or more races.

There were 102 households, out of which 26.5% had children under the age of 18 living with them, 64.7% were married couples living together, 6.9% had a female householder with no husband present, and 27.5% were non-families. 21.6% of all households were made up of individuals, and 6.9% had someone living alone who was 65 years of age or older. The average household size was 2.47 and the average family size was 2.91.

In the village, the population was spread out, with 21.4% under the age of 18, 9.5% from 18 to 24, 31.3% from 25 to 44, 27.4% from 45 to 64, and 10.3% who were 65 years of age or older. The median age was 37 years. For every 100 females, there were 104.9 males. For every 100 females age 18 and over, there were 102.0 males.

The median income for a household in the village was $30,375, and the median income for a family was $36,500. Males had a median income of $27,500 versus $18,750 for females. The per capita income for the village was $14,889. About 4.2% of families and 5.6% of the population were below the poverty line, including none of those under the age of eighteen or sixty five or over.
