= William Taylor (Virginia politician, born 1788) =

Nineteenth century congressman and lawyer from Virginia

Member of the U.S. House of Representatives from Virginia's 11th district
- In office March 4, 1843 – January 17, 1846
- Preceded by: John Botts
- Succeeded by: James McDowell

Member of the Virginia House of Delegates
- In office 1821

Personal details
- Born: April 5, 1788 Alexandria, Virginia, U.S.
- Died: January 17, 1846 (aged 57) Washington, D.C., U.S.
- Resting place: Congressional Cemetery, Washington, D.C., U.S.
- Party: Democratic
- Relatives: Thomas S. Hinde (brother-in-law); Thomas Hinde (father-in-law)
- Profession: Politician, lawyer

William Taylor (April 5, 1788 – January 17, 1846) was an American congressman and lawyer from Virginia.

== Biography ==
Born in Alexandria, Virginia, Taylor completed preparatory studies, studied law, and was admitted to the bar, commencing practice in Staunton, Virginia. He later moved to Lexington, Virginia, where he continued his law practice and became the commonwealth attorney for the county court of Rockbridge County, Virginia, serving from 1817 to 1843 and the commonwealth attorney for the circuit court of Pocahontas County, Virginia (now West Virginia) from 1817 to 1843. Taylor was a member of the Virginia House of Delegates in 1821 and was elected a Democrat to the United States House of Representatives in 1842, serving from 1843 until his death in 1846. There, he was chairman of the Committee on Accounts from 1843 to 1846. Taylor died on January 17, 1846, in Washington, D.C., and was interred there in Congressional Cemetery.

== See also ==
- Thomas S. Hinde, brother-in law.
- Thomas Hinde, father-in-law.
- List of members of the United States Congress who died in office (1790–1899)

U.S. House of Representatives
Preceded by John Botts	Member of the U.S. House of Representatives from Virginia's 11th congressional district March 4, 1843 – January 17, 1846	Succeeded by James McDowell
