= Thomas S. Hinde =

American minister and businessman

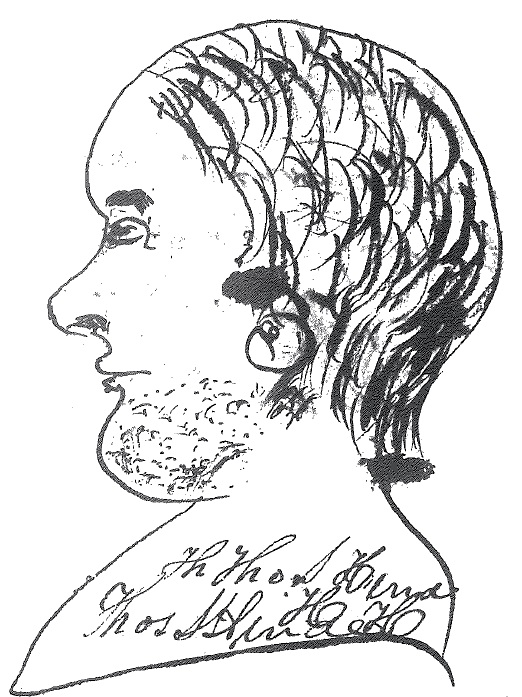
- A rough sketch (the only known portrait of him)
- Born: Thomas Spottswood Hinde; April 19, 1785; Hanover County, Virginia
- Died: February 9, 1846 (aged 60); Mount Carmel, Illinois
- Resting place: Sandhill Cemetery; Mount Carmel, Illinois
- Occupations: Real estate entrepreneur Methodist Minister; Author
- Spouse(s): Belinda Bradford Hinde(1809–1827); Sarah Doughty Cavileer Neal(1827–1846)
- Children: James B. Hinde; John M. Hinde; Martha Hinde; Edmund C. Hinde; Charles T. Hinde; Belinda Bradford Hinde
- Relatives: Thomas Hinde(father); Mary Todd Hubbard(mother); Frederick Hinde Zimmerman (grandson); Harry Hinde (grandson); Charles H. Constable (son-in-law); Jacob Zimmerman (son-in-law)
- Writing career
- Pen name: Theophilus Arminius
- Genres: Methodism; Religious; History
- Notable works: The Pilgrams Songster; Editor of The Fredonian; Biography of William Beauchamp; Biography of Thomas Hinde; Biography of Mary Todd Hubbard
- Military career
- Branch: United States Army
- Service years: 1812–1814
- Rank: Head of Prisoners
- Conflicts: War of 1812

Thomas Spottswood Hinde (April 19, 1785 – February 9, 1846) was an American newspaper editor, opponent of slavery, writer, historian, real estate investor, Methodist minister and a founder of the city of Mount Carmel, Illinois. Members of the Hinde family were prominent in Virginia, Kentucky, Ohio, and Illinois. His sons Charles T. Hinde became a shipping magnate and Edmund C. Hinde an adventurer. He was the father-in-law of judge Charles H. Constable.

Hinde was an active businessman, pursuing real estate, construction, and publishing opportunities in Kentucky, Ohio and Illinois. In his early years, Hinde publicly opposed slavery. He also used his newspaper, The Fredonian, in Chillicothe, Ohio between 1806 and 1808, to highlight issues about Indian treaties and the conspiracy of Aaron Burr. He served in the U.S. Army during the War of 1812. In later years he was a pioneer in the settlement of Indiana and Illinois, and the expansion of the Methodist Episcopal Church in these areas. He contributed to the Madoc Tradition and was a noted historian and biographer. Hinde cofounded the Wabash Navigation Company, which engaged in real estate speculation and dam construction. The company dammed the Wabash River next to Hinde's property, creating the Grand Rapids Dam. The dam was abandoned by the Federal government in 1931.

Hinde was an ordained Methodist minister and traveled extensively to advance the interests of the church. He was a pioneering circuit rider in the early 1800s in Kentucky, Indiana, Illinois, and Missouri. Hinde wrote and published religious articles in many leading publications. Francis Asbury, one of the first two bishops of the Methodist Episcopal Church, considered Hinde important to the church. He frequently met with him and mentioned him in his journals. Historian Lyman Draper spent more than twenty years collecting documents by and about the Hinde family, along with papers of other important figures of the Trans-Allegheny West. The Draper Manuscript Collection at the Wisconsin Historical Society holds 47 volumes of Hinde's personal papers, donated by his family after his death.

== Early years ==
Thomas S. Hinde was born April 19, 1785, in Hanover County, Virginia, to Thomas Hinde (1737–1828) and Mary Todd Hubbard (1734–1830), as the seventh of eight children. His father was an English doctor who served as a physician to Patrick Henry and General James Wolfe. Little is known about Hinde's early years except that the family moved from Virginia to Newport, Kentucky, in 1797 when his father was awarded a land grant of 10,000 acres (40 km^{2}) for his services in the American Revolutionary War. In a letter to President James Madison many years later, Hinde related that while walking to school in the wilderness of Kentucky, he once successfully fought off a wolf and a panther. Daniel Boone and Simon Kenton were neighbors of the Hinde family while they lived in Kentucky, and the three men grew up as colleagues. One of Hinde's sisters married Richard Southgate; his nephews William Wright Southgate and William Taylor became prominent lawyers and politicians.

After a conversion by his mother Mary and older sister Susannah in 1798, all of Hinde's family, including his father, converted to Christianity as Methodists. Thomas delayed a while. Shortly afterward the younger Hinde became close friends with Francis Asbury, who became a prominent bishop in the church. Hinde later described the conversion of his youngest sister, Martha Harrison Hinde, in an 1827 article published in the Methodist Review under his pen name, Theophilus Arminius. Hinde recounted Bishop Asbury visiting his father's home in 1803 and telling Martha that she had better find God, because before he could meet her again she would be dead. The bishop's prophecy came true when Martha died in 1811 without having seen Asbury again. Hinde said she had converted before her death and tried to convert the nonbelievers in the room while on her deathbed. He shared a letter in which his sister had tried to convert her close friends. Hinde named his first daughter after his late sister Martha. Hinde did not immediately convert but attended Methodist camp meetings of the period. During his life, he frequently wrote about the importance of the camp meeting in bringing Christianity and democracy to the west.

In 1801, Hinde got a job as deputy clerk for the Kentucky Court of Appeals. William Kavanaugh, the husband of Hinde's older sister Hannah, assigned him to Achilles Sneed of Frankfort. He received a good legal education with Sneed, who was Clerk of the Court of Appeals. During this time, Hinde became acquainted with many of the state's leading men, and acquired a knowledge of the law. He also developed a reputation as one of Kentucky's most efficient businessmen. Hinde wrote to Henry Clay that he was the first lawyer whom Hinde heard address a court. Hinde resided in a boarding house, shared with many of the leading judges and politicians of the day, where he strengthened his personal and political contacts.

== Newspaper publisher ==
From an early age, Hinde opposed slavery. Although their parents owned slaves, he and his siblings repudiated slavery on religious grounds. Hinde's opposition increased and eventually he and other friends became outspoken critics of the institution in Kentucky, where slavery was commonplace in the middle and western parts of the state. In the Great Awakening, Methodists were prominent among those who opposed slavery, although they also converted slaves and welcomed them into congregations. In Kentucky Hinde joined other Methodist ministers in the abolitionist movement.

In a letter to President Madison, Hinde attributed his opposition to slavery to the influence of his mother. He wrote:

In 1805, Messrs. Wood and Street, from Richmond, Va., found their way to Kentucky. Friendly considerations led me to patronize them. This was done through the solicitations of a young friend from Virginia. They commenced a paper, published in 1806, called the 'Western World.' Imbibing strong prejudices against slavery, perhaps from my mother's repeating, in my infancy, the nurse's songs composed by Cowper, designed to make such impressions. In June 1806, to the great astonishment of my friends, I left Kentucky, with all the flattering prospects a youth could have, and hastened to Ohio. Connecting circumstances, and from hints that fell from Wood and others, a deep impression had been made on my mind, that an eventful period was fast approaching.

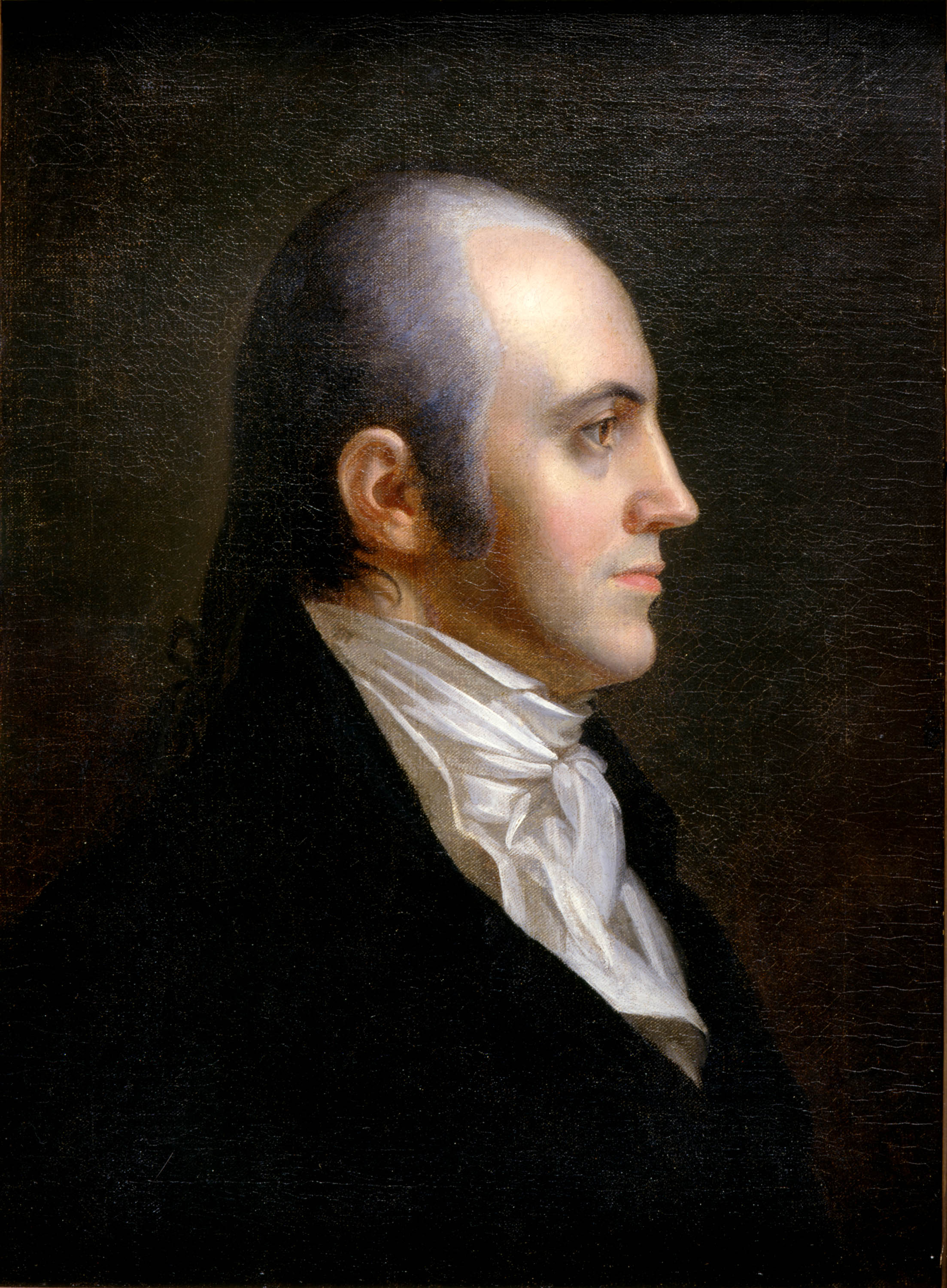
Aaron Burr

Because of the slavery issue, in 1806 Hinde moved from Kentucky to Chillicothe in the free state of Ohio. In partnership with his brother-in-law R.D. Richardson, beginning in 1806, he edited and published a newspaper titled the Fredonian. Fredonian was a sonorous name for "a citizen of the United States". In later years it was applied to an American-inspired rebellion to separate Texas from Mexico.

From early in his career, Hinde fought the projects of Aaron Burr. He collected and published material in The Fredonian related to what he said was Burr's conspiracy to overthrow the US government. Hinde sent the evidence to Henry Clay, a longtime friend of his family and later secretary of state, but the papers disappeared.

While working at the Kentucky Court of Appeals, Hinde had developed a close relationship with George Madison and his nephew John Madison. In 1829 Hinde wrote to their relation, President James Madison, to provide him with information about the Burr conspiracy for a political history the president was said to be writing. Madison denied the project, but asked Hinde to send copies of The Fredonian to include in his presidential papers. Hinde sent newspaper issues dealing with the Burr Conspiracy. The copies of the newspaper were filed with the President's papers.

After moving to Ohio, Hinde was unanimously elected by the Ohio House of Representatives to the position of clerk pro tempore. He held the position for three years before shifting to focus on his successful speculation in military lands.

== Marriages and family ==
On October 19, 1809, with minister William Lynes officiating, Hinde at the age of 24 married Belinda Bradford, the daughter of the late James Bradford, in Hamilton County, Ohio. His father-in-law was a descendant of William Bradford of Plymouth Colony. He had been killed in 1791 in St. Clair's Defeat, and buried in Fort Recovery.

Hinde and Belinda had three children: James B., John Madison, and Martha. The second son was named after Hinde's friend John Madison, a nephew of George Madison and a relative of James Madison. The daughter Martha married Charles H. Constable, who became a prominent Illinois politician. He is notable for his decision as judge to allow four Union deserters to go free during the Civil War. Belinda died in 1827.

In 1828, Hinde married Sarah Neal (Daugherty) Cavileer. They had three children: Edmund C., Charles T. and Belinda. Edmund was a pioneer who participated in the California Gold Rush; after his death, his journals were published. Charles became a business tycoon in Southern California, playing a pivotal role in its development through his shipping expertise. Belinda married Jacob Zimmerman, a successful newspaper editor and owner who in later years held a number of political offices in Illinois.

== Conversion to Methodism ==
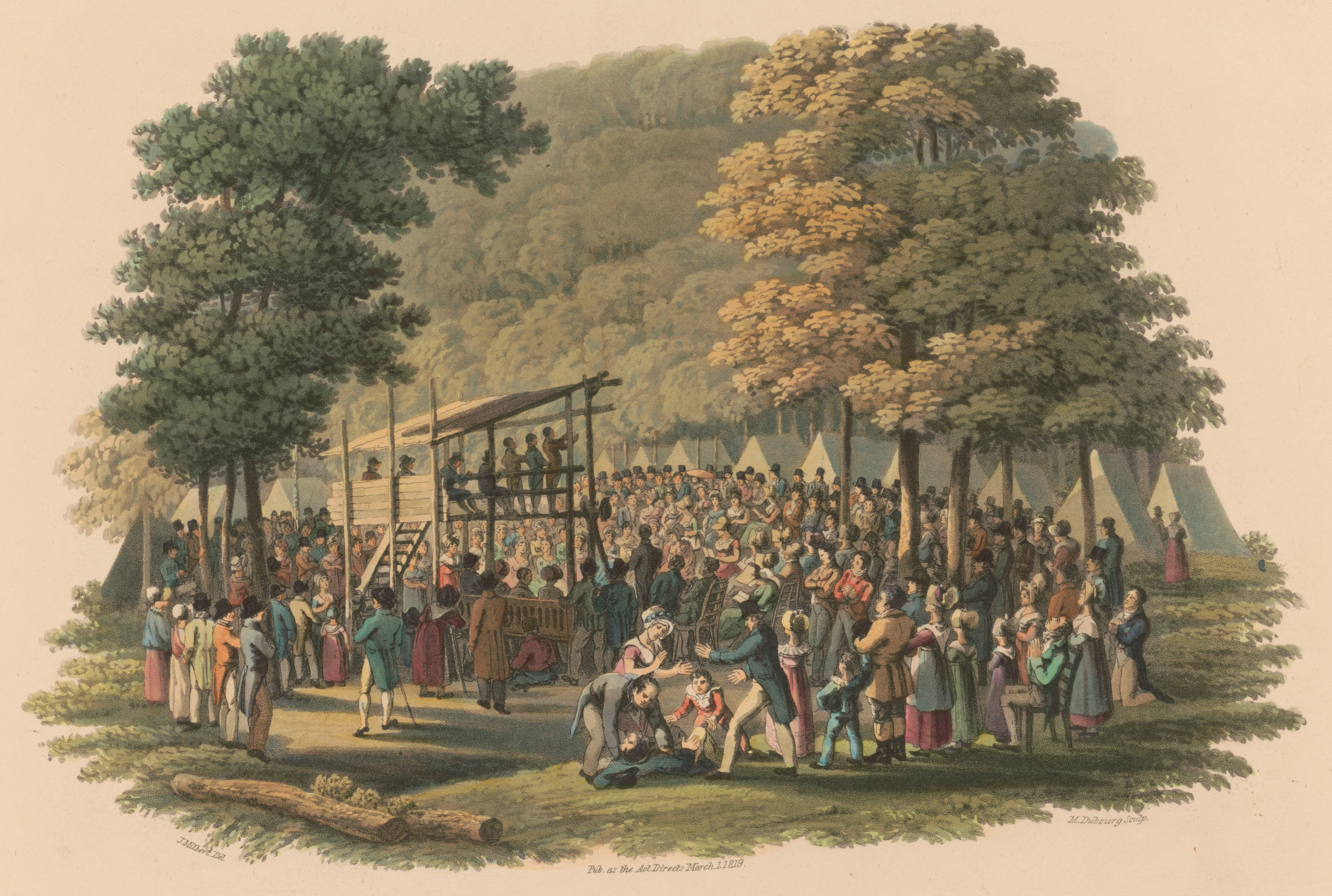
An engraving of a Methodist camp meeting in 1819 (Library of Congress).

Hinde was involved with the newspaper for less than two years. He converted from Deism to Methodism and decided that operating a political journal conflicted with his new religious views. After retiring from the newspaper business, he engaged in locating military lands and in land speculation. For the rest of his life, Hinde published editorials in newspapers and religious publications. He organized several camp meetings with other preachers, saying that the camp meeting could unite the different Protestant denominations.

At times, Francis Asbury ventured into the wilderness to visit Hinde. An 1856 account states,

In 1810 Bishop Asbury visited an obscure part of the western country (Kanawha) which was then a wilderness, and pleasantly told the Rev. Thomas S. Hinde that he had visited the region so that the people might see and know their superintendent; remarking, "The shepherd ought to know the flock, and the flock the shepherd: they ought to know what man it is that governs them, and I have come nearly one hundred miles out of my way to see them." The writer exclaims, "O Asbury, the inhabitants of these hills and mountains will long make mention of thee!"

Hinde is thought to have received his license to preach sometime around 1810. His first sermon was in Chillicothe in either 1807 or 1808, and people were so eager to hear him that they filled the church. The sermon was described as having "...no coherence in his discourse." During the sermon, Hinde repeatedly stated, "My bowels, my bowels!"

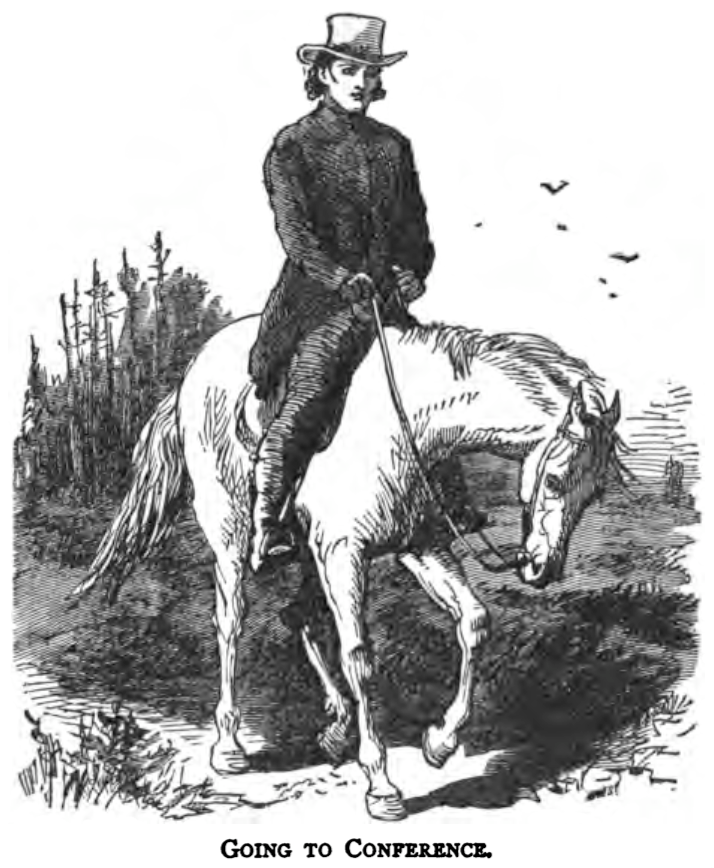
Methodist circuit rider on horseback

According to a 19th-century account,

As a preacher, he was rather eccentric. He was not very fluent and gifted as a speaker, but had the power of engaging the attention of his hearers, and was very successful and useful in a revival of religion. He entertained rather singular views on the subject of the orders in the ministry, objecting to the order of deacons, and holding that the eldership is the only true order. In consequence of these peculiar views, he would never consent to be ordained a deacon, and therefore never entered into orders at all.

Hinde became a circuit rider in the early 1800s. While his circuit varied over the years, he served large portions of Kentucky, Indiana, Illinois, and Missouri. Much of the territory he covered was generally lawless, violent and dangerous. Circuit riders served numerous churches and were supposed to plant new ones in new or underserved communities. They were critical to the development of the frontier.

An avid writer, Hinde wrote mostly about Methodism and church songs. He wrote a popular hymnal entitled The Pilgrams' songster; or, A choice collection of spiritual songs, which was said to have sold more than 10,000 copies. Rev. Thomas S. Hinde was said to be, "...exceedingly earnest, and very zealous in promoting the interests of the Church and of religion and morality. His zeal, however, was rather of the ascetic kind; and he usually took prominent part in the arraignment and trial of brethren accused of offenses." He was quoted as saying that he was,"...doing God service."

== Indian affairs ==
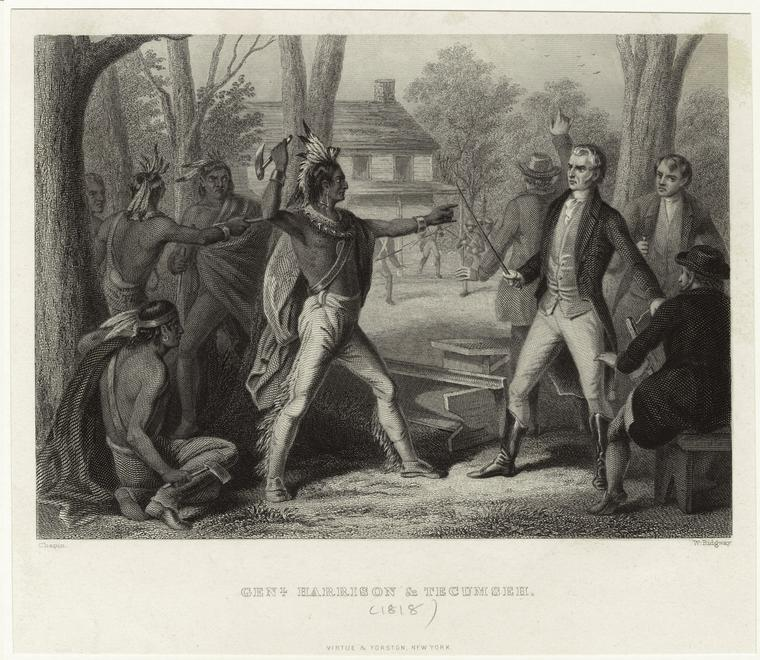
At Vincennes in 1810, Tecumseh loses his temper when William Henry Harrison refuses to rescind the Treaty of Fort Wayne.

Growing up in Kentucky in the late 1790s, Hinde learned of the danger of Indian attacks. After moving to Chillicothe, he became interested in prehistoric Indian sites. In a letter to President James Madison, he mentioned taking friends to Windship's mound (now the Hopewell Culture National Historical Park), but focused on his opposition to slavery, saying he called

their attention to the surrounding scenery, my former pursuits, my friends, my country, my prospects—all these had been abandoned for the pride of opinion, against the entailment and perpetuation of slavery upon the rising generation! I remember their looks when I remarked, that after all, (pointing to the sun eclipsed,) I spoke of the gloom that overshadowed my future prospects!

Hinde purchased property from William Mc'Intosh near the Wabash River, an area that had been a Piankashaw Indian campground. It contained numerous earthwork mounds built by cultures that predated the Piankashaw.

Hinde met the Shawnee chief Tecumseh in Chillicothe and in Vincennes, Indiana, during either the 1810 or the 1811 meeting between Tecumseh and William Henry Harrison at Grouseland. Hinde also met prominent Shawnee Blue Jacket and reported on him for the local newspapers. One source says that Hinde played a crucial role in negotiating early Indian treaties signed with the United States government, without defining his actions.

== War of 1812 ==
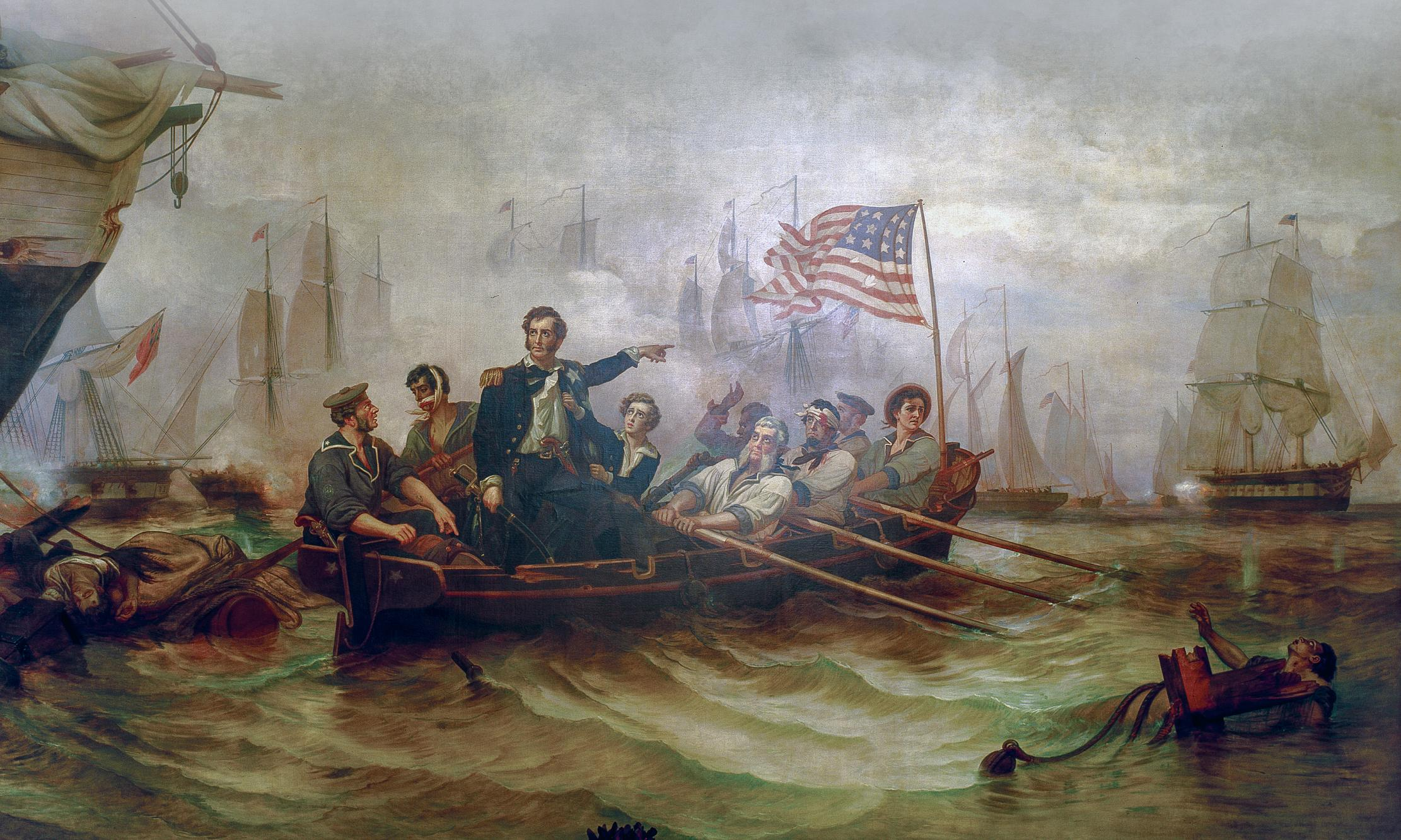
Oliver Hazard Perry at the Battle of Lake Erie

Hinde served in the U.S. Army in the War of 1812 under William Henry Harrison, then governor of the Indiana Territory. Both from Virginia families, the two men were close in age. Hinde was made responsible for prisoners of war starting in 1813, when he was about 27 or 28 years old.

Hinde served under Captain Oliver Hazard Perry, who was the commander at the Battle of Lake Erie. Captain Perry's decisive victory ensured American control of the lake, improved American morale after a series of defeats, and compelled the British to fall back from Detroit. In 1813, Hinde was placed in charge of prisoners captured at this battle.

== Founding Mount Carmel ==
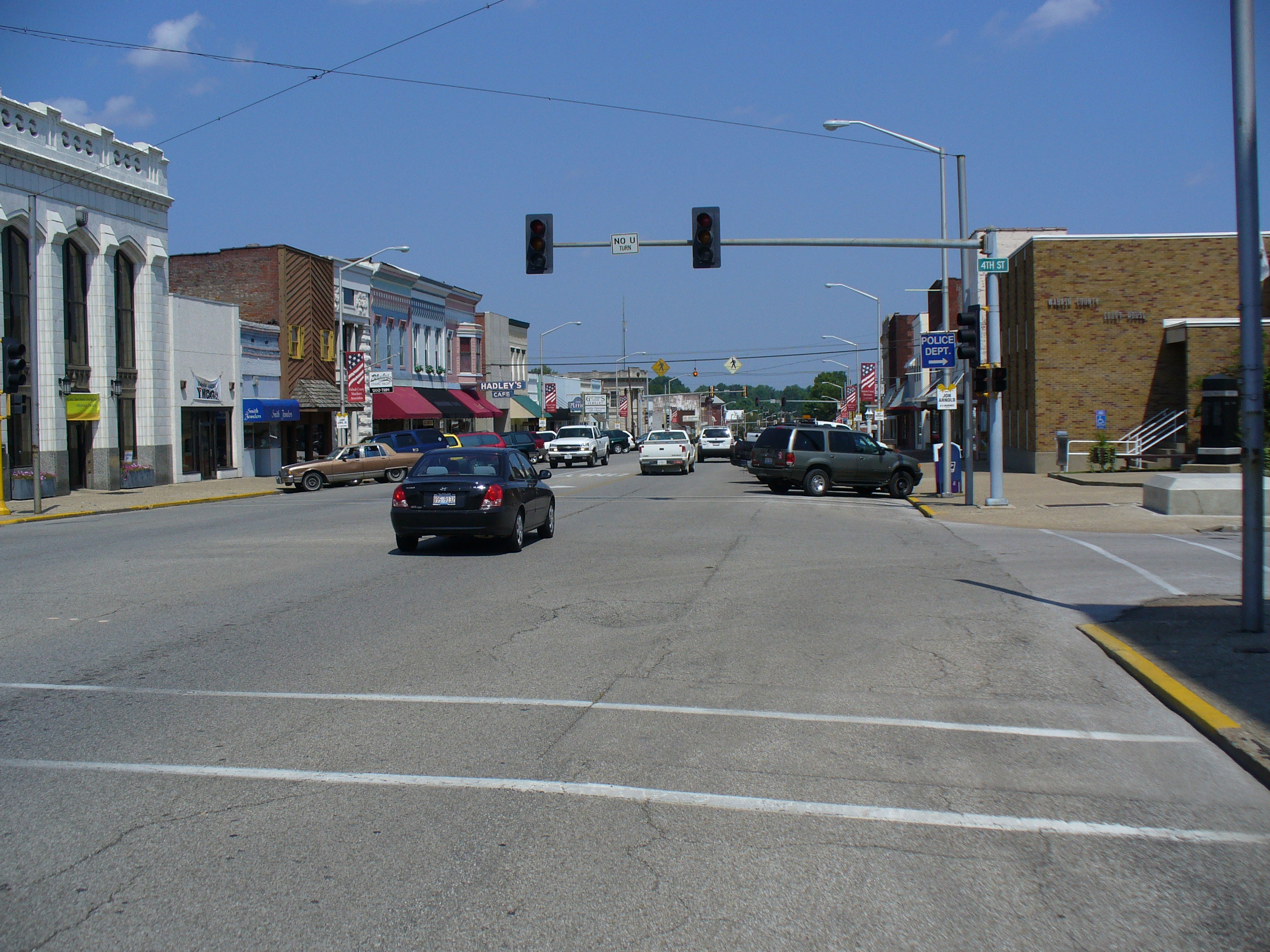
Market St. in Mount Carmel, Illinois

In the early 1800s, Hinde purchased large land holdings in what would become Wabash County, Illinois. In 1817, he, William McDowell and William Beauchamp collectively founded the city of Mount Carmel, Illinois. All three men were ministers. They chose the Biblical name "Mount Carmel", because it meant "the garden of the Lord" and was a historic city in Palestine. According to one source:

The site chosen for the town was a point on the west bank of the Wabash opposite the mouth of the White River, and twenty-four miles southwest of Vincennes. This point was selected because of the available water power and of the likelihood that main roads from east to west would pass here. The town became a railroad and manufacturing center and justified the wisdom of its founders. An elaborate circular, called the "Articles of Association for the City of Mount Carmel," was issued at Chillicothe in 1817. The purpose of the association was announced to be "to build a city on liberal and advantageous principles, and to constitute funds for the establishment of seminaries of learning and for religious purposes." The proprietors reserved for themselves one-fourth of the lots, these being called "proprietors' lots;" one-fourth were called "private donation lots." The plan of survey and sale was described as follows: "The in-lots are six poles in front, and eleven and a half in back; containing each sixty-eight perches, nearly half an acre. The most of the out-lots contain four acres and eight square poles; some of them more, (five and six acres on the back range); and a few of them less. There are 748 in-lots, and 331 out-lots --1079 in the whole.

Hinde donated the majority of the land for the city. Shortly after it was incorporated, he gave permission for city residents to use part of his land near the Wabash River as a "commons" for livestock. Hinde, Beauchamp and McDowell were granted permission by the legislature to establish a ferry on Hinde's land at the river. During this time Hinde did the primary survey work for the Grand Rapids Dam on the river. According to a local history published in 1883, he was believed to reside in a house located on the "bluff" in Mount Carmel. In letters to Congress written in the 1820s, Hinde said that he resided near the Grand Rapids Dam. He wrote a poem about Mount Carmel and had it published in Ohio.

Originally, Mount Carmel was located in Edwards County. After a drought in 1820 killed a majority of the settlers, the county seat was moved from Palmyra, Illinois to Albion. At that time Albion was settled primarily by English immigrants. The Americans from Mount Carmel and surrounding settlements were resentful and tried to return the county seat to Mount Carmel by force. During the bickering for the county seat location, Hinde ran for county commissioner in 1821 against John Buckles, receiving only two votes against Buckles' 151. In 1822 Hinde ran for the office of Illinois House of Representatives and narrowly lost to Gilbert T. Pell. On December 24, 1824, the Illinois Legislature resolved the county seat issue by creating Wabash County from the eastern half of Edwards County.

Based on newspaper accounts, the lots held by Hinde did not sell quickly. More than 27 years after having developed the plans for Mount Carmel, Hinde was still advertising lots for sale there in national newspapers. In one advertisement Hinde said, "The place I offer is midway between St. Louis and Louisville and the next improvement will be the completion of the railroad connecting the two places, and a dam across the Great Wabash, at the Grand Rapids, at the junction of the White, Patoka, and Wabash, giving the greatest water power in the great West."

Another source notes that Hinde and other founders "...may have been over zealous and puritanical in the construction of their laws... no theater or play-house shall ever be built within the boundary of the city; no person shall be guilty of drunkenness, profanity, sabbath-breaking, and many other offenses of greater magnitude, etc., he shall be subject to trial by the court of Mayor and on conviction, was disqualified from holding any office in the city, or the bank; was disqualified to vote; ostracism was to continue for three years after the commission of the so-called crimes."

Around 1825, Hinde settled in Mount Carmel, leaving the Methodist circuit to focus on religious and historical writing, and business. He founded one of the first churches in the town and occasionally held Methodist gatherings at his home. On September 20, 1827, more than 27 Methodist ministers met in the upper room of his house. It was one of the largest gatherings of the time.

== Real estate disputes ==
After his father died in 1828, Hinde inherited real estate in Kentucky. Shortly thereafter, he began investing in real estate in Ohio. Property titles were frequently complicated in this period due to turnover of military lands, as well as issues related to acquisition of former Native American lands. Several of his Ohio property disputes reached the Supreme Court of the United States, including Hinde v. Vattier and Mallow v. Hinde.

=== Johnson v. McIntosh ===
William M'Intosh was a former Revolutionary War veteran who had become a fur trader and investor in military lands along the Wabash River. Hinde and M'Intosh lived on adjoining tracts of land near what would become the site of the Grand Rapids Dam.

M'Intosh became associated with the Supreme Court Case of Johnson v. McIntosh. Chief Justice John Marshall, an acquaintance of Hinde and his father, used the case to establish the "Discovery Doctrine," which ruled that the discovering people gain title over the indigenous peoples in respect to land title. Hinde also knew Associate Justice Thomas Todd, a justice of the Kentucky Court of Appeals when Hinde served as the court's clerk. In the case, in which Johnson and M'Intosh were claiming title to the same property, the Supreme Court ruled that private citizens could not purchase land from Native Americans, and therefore the plaintiff Johnson's land purchases were invalid. M'Intosh's land purchases from the Federal government were affirmed as legal.

Hinde purchased a portion of M'Intosh's litigated property not long after the litigation. Correspondence between Hinde and M'Intosh discussing land sales form part of the Hinde documents at the Lyman Draper Manuscripts Collection in the Wisconsin Historical Society. Due to the favorable ruling in the case, Hinde benefited greatly because of his large land holdings in the area. After the ruling had settled ownership issues between the Indians and settlers, Hinde founded the towns of Mt. Carmel, Powhaten, and Selima in the Illinois territory.

=== Hinde v. Vattier ===
One of Hinde's own real estate disputes was based on property he owned in Cincinnati. The dispute was between the Hinde family and Charles Vattier. Vattier was a known scam artist and underworld giant in Cincinnati. One source described Vattier as owning "...a gambling empire, including grog shops, Bawdy houses and taverns." Vattier was involved in a number of other fraudulent real estate schemes with other people in Ohio. In 1807 Vattier was convicted of burglary and larceny for stealing large sums of money from James Findlay, Receiver of Public Monies for the District of Cincinnati. Hinde knew Findlay since they were both involved in exposing the Burr conspiracy and both were prominent in Ohio.

Allegedly, Vattier had tried to take title to a piece of property in Cincinnati already owned by the Hinde family. Hinde challenged Vattier in court. Henry Clay represented Hinde in the Ohio State Court proceedings. Hinde claimed that Vattier tried to use the lot to pay Findlay by claiming to have a bill of sale and title that was superior to the Hinde family. After more than fifteen years, the case reached the United States Supreme Court in 1833. The Court ruled that Vattier took title to the property illegally and that the property belonged to Hinde and his children. Originally owned by Hinde's father-in-law, James Bradford, after his death the property passed to Hinde's wife, Belinda (Bradford) Hinde.

== Wabash Navigation Company ==
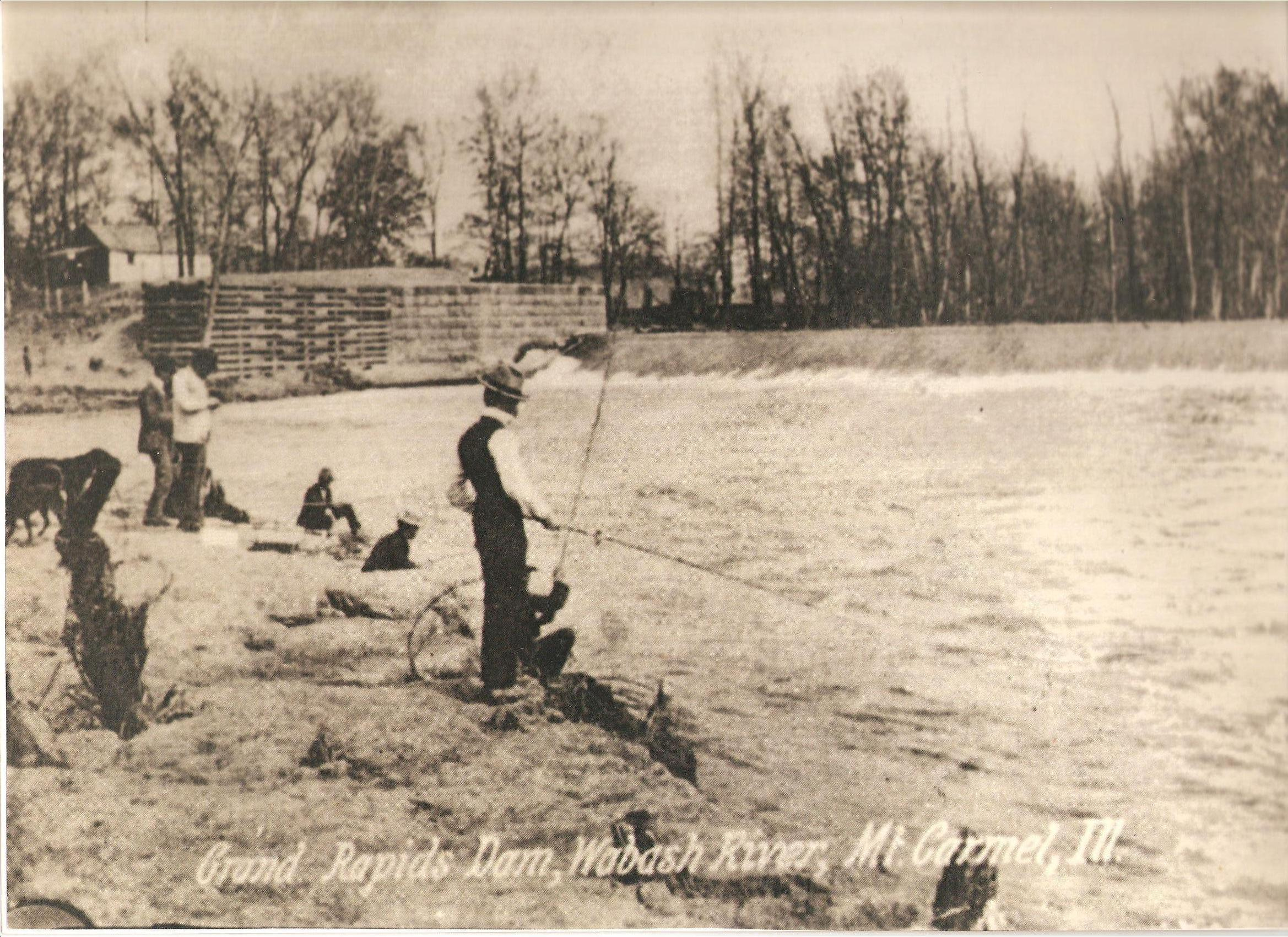
Grand Rapids Dam

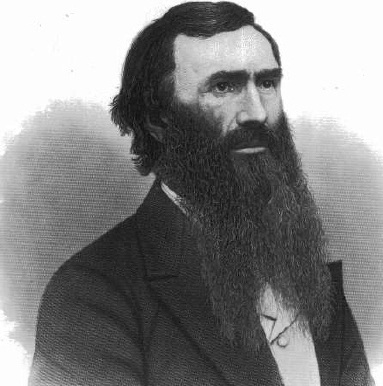
Dr. John Jacob Lescher

In 1825, Hinde joined the Wabash Navigation Company. Seventeen members of the company came from prominent families in Indiana and Illinois. The company had capital of more than $1 million. Hinde was one of the company's first nine directors and remained active until his death. The company charter was eventually approved by both the Illinois and Indiana legislatures. The company built a dam next to land Hinde owned.

In a letter to Congress in 1842, Hinde stated that his goal was to connect the Wabash River with the Maumee River that flowed to Lake Erie. He cited in support the opinion of unnamed hunters and traders and George Washington's hope of connecting the waters of the east with the Ohio and Mississippi rivers. Hinde also declared, "...I have seen the whole wilderness of the West subdued and savages and wild beasts or prey receding before civilization and enterprise." He said that, on the Wabash from the Grand Rapids to Terre Haute, steamboats could navigate almost all year; therefore it was essential to connect the river to the Ohio. He also suggested that an armory should be built by the U.S. Government next to the proposed dam.

Dr. John Lescher was a business partner and friend of Thomas S. Hinde. Both men invested in the Wabash Navigation Company. Lescher later joined Hinde's children in a lawsuit against the company. Not long after the death of Hinde, his son James and his son-in-law Charles H. Constable joined with Lescher and sued the company for entering their land and taking timber and other materials for the construction of dam. But, the company's charter permitted them to enter the land and take construction material without the owner's consent, forcing the owner to seek legal redress. The court ordered compensation.

A letter written by Jacob Lescher in 1841 and submitted to Congress in support of the Grand Rapids Dam project and the building of a U.S. Armory, stated that he and Hinde owned more than 1,200 acres (4.9 km^{2}) acres of land around the proposed dam site. Additional information submitted to Congress stated that the town of Powhatan was owned by Hinde and Lescher and was a "river addition" to Mount Carmel. The location of the town of Selima was not clearly stated, but was near the dam. Hinde did the original surveying for Grand Rapids Dam.

The wooden timber dam deteriorated and needed to be replaced in the late nineteenth century. On September 19, 1890, Congress appropriated money for the construction of a new dam, to be built by the Army Corps of Engineers. The report stated that the old dam had partially washed away and that the new dam would raise the water level by 11.5 feet. According to an annual report to the Secretary of War in 1908, the mid-19th century lock and dam were "...not of a substantial character....," and "...rapidly deteriorated and became useless." The same report said that by March 31, 1881, expenditures for the dam were $317,845.44 and the government was forced to pay the Wabash Navigation Company an additional $7,000 to extinguish their franchise and purchase their property.

== Later years and legacy ==
Sons of Thomas S. Hinde

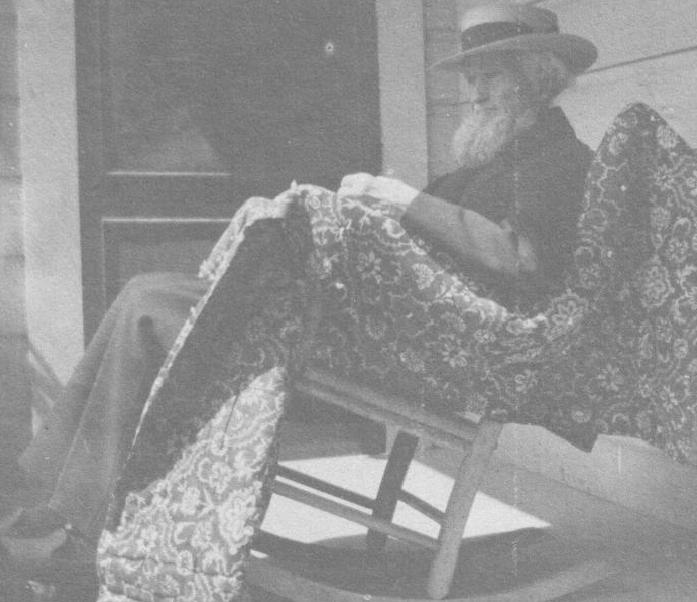
Edmund C. Hinde, 4th child of Thomas S. Hinde

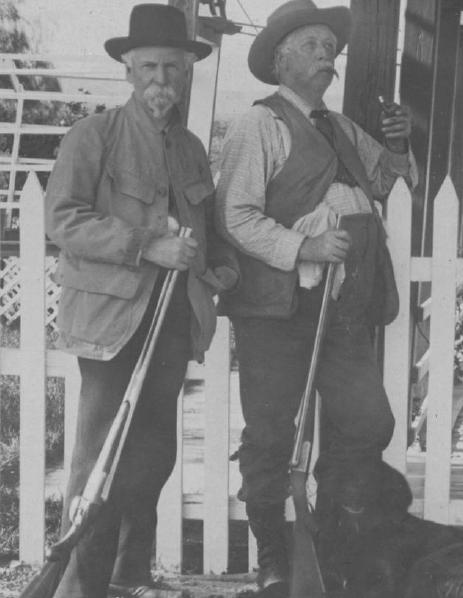
Charles T. Hinde, 5th child of Thomas S. Hinde, with President William Howard Taft

Hinde settled in Mount Carmel toward the end of his life. During Hinde's final years, he was an active letter writer and watched over his many business and real estate interests. Hinde was prominent in church and Illinois society and compiled many documents and interviews. During his later years, he shared much of this information with various writers and publications.

In his later writings, Hinde espoused some questionable theories such as the Hollow Earth theory and the Madoc tradition. Hinde was published in the Methodist Magazine, the "Short Sketches of Revivals of Religion in the Western Country" (incomplete), the Advocate and Journal (New York) and the Western Christian Advocate (Cincinnati). His writings have been described as, "...abound[ing] in vague philosophical and religious reflections-- this is especially true of his diaries-- thus making them of slight value...."

Hinde dedicated a substantial amount of time to investigating the Madoc Tradition in North America. Madoc or Madog ab Owain Gwynedd was, according to folklore, a Welsh prince who sailed to America in 1170, more than 300 years before Christopher Columbus's voyage in 1492. Hinde interviewed hundreds of individuals on the topic. In 1824, Hinde wrote a letter to John S. Williams, editor of The American Pioneer regarding the Madoc Tradition. He claimed to have testimony from numerous sources that said Welsh people under Owen Ap Zuinch had come to America in the twelfth century, over 300 years before Christopher Columbus. Hinde claimed that in 1799, the remains of six soldiers had been dug up near Jeffersonville, Indiana with breastplates containing Welsh coats of arms. In 1799, John Sevier, the first governor of Tennessee, also wrote of the alleged discovery of six skeletons in brass armor bearing Welsh coat-of-arms. Hinde claimed that M'Intosh recounted that American Indians and Welshmen living on the Mississippi River were conversing in Welsh in the late 1700s.

In an 1842 letter, Hinde stated, "I have just returned from the East, having visited the Atlantic cities generally for the first time, after forty-five years pioneering in the wilderness of the West. I have been three time a citizen of Kentucky, twice of Ohio, and twice of Illinois." After returning from the visit, Hinde claimed that eastern ministers were unsuccessful because they underrated the people of the West. He said,

"If we expect to find on crossing the mountains a people either illiterate or ignorant as a body, we will assuredly, in many instances be disappointed. It too often happens, that one puffed up with self-importance, and possesses a conceited and heated imagination, will form wild conjectures as to men and things. We have been amused at the bewildered minds of such, with the 'whys' and 'wherefores'; and one of the most ridiculous whims of some, is to endeavor to press every thing into their own mould; and shape it, be it what it may, if possible, after their own manner, custom, or operation, forgetting that 'we have to take the world as it is, and not as we would have it to be.'"

A large collection of Hinde's diaries are held among the Lyman Draper Manuscripts in the Wisconsin Historical Society. In his diaries Hinde stated that he supported the Hollow Earth theory. Throughout his life Hinde maintained correspondence with many of the prominent men of the day. His correspondents included James Madison, George Madison, Thomas Jefferson, Henry Clay, Simon Kenton, Daniel Boone, and John Marshall.

=== Death ===
Hinde was sick for a few days before dying from "winter fever." Hinde is buried in Sandhill Cemetery in Mount Carmel next to his daughter Belinda and his second wife, Sarah Doughty Cavileer Neal. The wrought iron fence surrounding their graves was paid for by his son Charles in the early 1900s. Since he died at a relatively early age and his wife died shortly after him, his orphaned children were forced to live with other relatives or fend for themselves. Martha married Judge Charles H. Constable; together they looked after many of her younger siblings until they married or found work. Her brother Charles Hinde became a successful businessman and riverboat captain. One of Captain Hinde's accomplishments was investing in the Hotel del Coronado in San Diego, California. Hinde's grandson, Frederick Zimmerman, built the Grand Rapids Hotel on the Hinde family farm in Mount Carmel near the Grand Rapids Dam and Hanging Rock.

Preceded by Position Created	Clerk of the Ohio House of Representatives; 1806–1809	Succeeded by Unknown
