= Richard Southgate (politician) =

American politician (1774–1857)

Member of the Kentucky Senate from Boone, Campbell, and Pendleton Counties
- In office 1817–1821

Member of the Kentucky House of Representatives
- In office 1803–1804

Commonwealth's Attorney for Campbell County
- In office 1798

Personal details
- Born: January 23, 1774 New York City, New York
- Died: July 24, 1857 (aged 83) Newport, Kentucky
- Resting place: Evergreen Cemetery; Southgate, Kentucky
- Relations: Stephen Lush (uncle); Thomas S. Hinde (brother-in-law); Thomas Hinde (father-in-law); William Wright Southgate (son); Nathaniel Shaler (grandson); John T. Thompson (great-grandson)
- Education: College of William and Mary

Richard Southgate (January 23, 1774 - July 24, 1857) was an American attorney and politician who served as a member of both chambers of the Kentucky General Assembly during the early 19th century. A prominent citizen and landowner in Campbell County, the city of Southgate is named after him.

== Early life and education ==
Richard Southgate was born on January 23, 1774, in New York City to Wright and Mary (Lush) Southgate. He received his early education in Virginia, and received a bachelor's degree from the College of William and Mary before reading law in Albany, New York under his uncle Stephen Lush.

== Career ==
In 1792, he acquired land in Newport, Kentucky, and moved there in 1795, quickly becoming a prominent attorney and citizen. He was appointed commonwealth's attorney for Campbell County in 1798, elected to the Kentucky House of Representatives in 1803, and elected to the Kentucky Senate in 1817.

Southgate also came to be one of the wealthiest men in the state, owning and leasing out vast amounts of property in Kentucky and Ohio as well as operating businesses such as a dry goods store and a well known health resort. The city of Southgate, which was named in his honor, currently sits almost entirely on land he used to own. He also donated 17 acres for the formation of Evergreen Cemetery.

In 1814, he used British prisoners from the War of 1812 held at the Newport Barracks to construct a home which would come to be known as the Southgate-Parker-Maddux House. Listed on the national register of historic places, the lavish house is one of Newport's oldest structures, and reportedly hosted visitors such as Henry Clay, James K. Polk, Abraham Lincoln, and Zachary Taylor.

== Personal life and family ==
In 1799, he married Ann Winston Hinde, the daughter of Dr. Thomas Hinde and sister of minister Thomas S. Hinde. The two went on to have eight children, including William Wright Southgate, who he provided for generously, gifting them each a house upon their marriage. His favorite grandson was Nathaniel Southgate Shaler, who he hired a private tutor for and sent to study at Harvard University.

== Death ==
Southgate died on July 24, 1857, in Newport, and was interred at Evergreen Cemetery. After his death, his estate was valued at $1.5 million ($57.5 million in 2026).
