= William Wright Southgate =

American politician

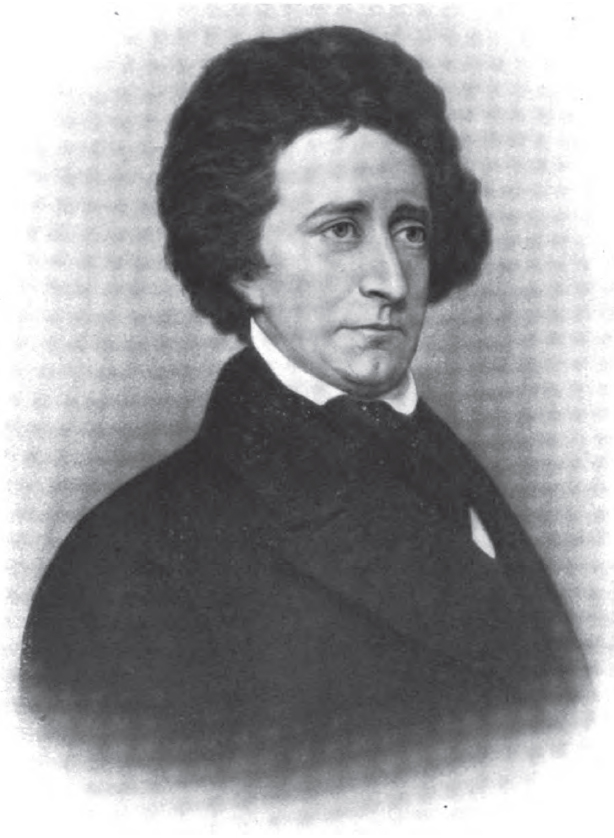

Member of the U.S. House of Representatives from Kentucky's 13th district
- In office March 4, 1837 – March 3, 1839
- Preceded by: Richard Mentor Johnson
- Succeeded by: William O. Butler

Member of the Kentucky House of Representatives
- In office 1827; 1832; 1836

Personal details
- Born: November 27, 1800 Newport, Kentucky
- Died: December 26, 1849 (aged 49) Covington, Kentucky
- Resting place: Linden Grove Cemetery
- Party: Whig
- Education: Transylvania University
- Profession: Lawyer
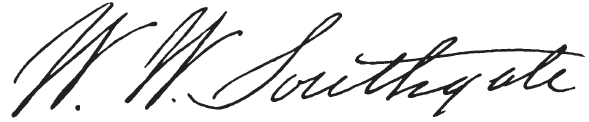
- Signature

William Wright Southgate (November 27, 1800 in Newport, Kentucky – December 26, 1849 in Covington, Kentucky) was a Kentucky State and United States politician. He was the son of Richard Southgate and Ann Winston Hinde. He married Adaliza Keene of Lexington, Kentucky, on November 7, 1823, and they had 13 children.

William Wright was graduated from Transylvania University in Lexington. He moved to Covington, Kenton County, Kentucky, studied law and was admitted to the bar in 1821 and commenced practice in Lexington. He was a member of the Kentucky House of Representatives in 1827, 1832 and 1836. He was elected as a Whig to the Twenty-fifth Congress (March 4, 1837 - March 3, 1839). When he returned to Covington, he purchased the Thomas D. Carneal House (Covington's oldest and most elegant house). In 1840, he added a large wing to accommodate his growing family. He and Adaliza had thirteen children.

Southgate died in Covington on December 26, 1849. Services were held at the Masonic Hall in Covington and burial was in the Southgate vault in Linden Grove Cemetery. The Licking Valley Register (a local newspaper) said Southgate's unexpected death had "cast a gloom over the city such as we have never before witnessed".

== See also ==
- Thomas S. Hinde, uncle of William Southgate.
- Thomas Hinde, grandfather of William Southgate.

U.S. House of Representatives
Preceded by Richard M. Johnson	Member of the U.S. House of Representatives from Kentucky's 13th congressional district 1837–1839 (obsolete district)	Succeeded by William O. Butler
