= James McDowell =

American politician (1795–1851)

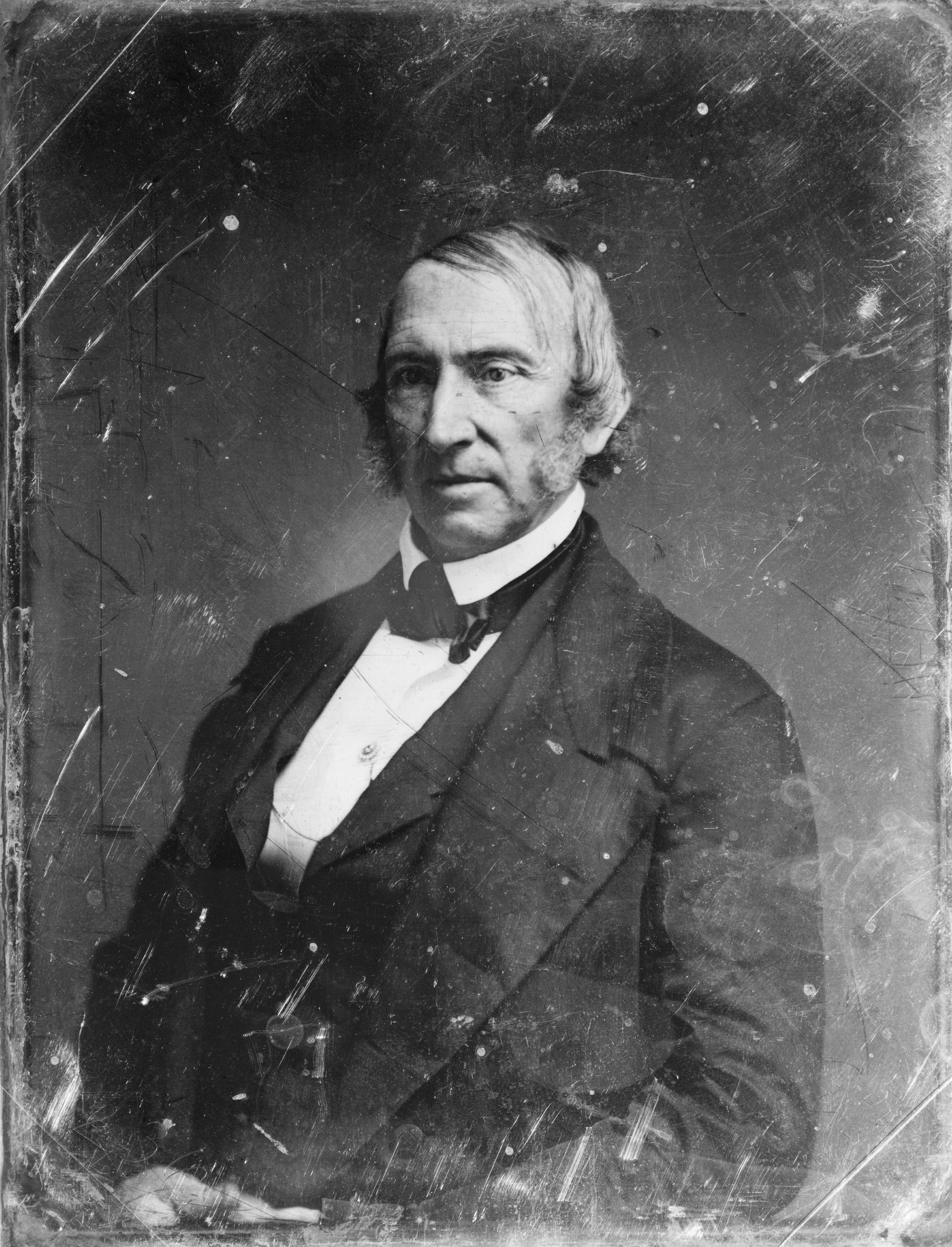
- Daguerreotype portrait of Governor McDowell

Member of the U.S. House of Representatives from Virginia's 11th district
- In office March 6, 1846 – March 3, 1851
- Preceded by: William Taylor
- Succeeded by: John Letcher

29th Governor of Virginia
- In office January 1, 1843 – January 1, 1846
- Preceded by: John Munford Gregory (acting)
- Succeeded by: William Smith

Member of the Virginia House of Delegates
- In office 1831–1835; 1838

Personal details
- Born: October 13, 1795 Rockbridge County, Virginia, U.S.
- Died: August 24, 1851 (aged 55) Lexington, Virginia, U.S.
- Party: Democratic
- Spouse: Susanna Smith Preston

James McDowell (October 13, 1795 – August 24, 1851) was the 29th Governor of Virginia from 1843 to 1846 and was a U.S. Congressman from 1846 to 1851.

== Biography ==
McDowell was born at "Cherry Grove," near Rockbridge County, Virginia, on October 13, 1795. He attended a classical school at Greenville, Virginia, a private school at Brownsburg, Washington College (now Washington and Lee University), Lexington, Virginia, and Yale College. He graduated from Princeton University in 1817 and studied law. He was admitted to the bar but did not practice. He was a member of the State house of delegates 1831–1835 and again in 1838. He was chosen as Governor of Virginia in 1843. He was elected as a Democrat to the Twenty-ninth Congress to fill the vacancy caused by the death of William Taylor. He was reelected to the Thirtieth and Thirty-first Congresses and served from March 6, 1846, to March 3, 1851. McDowell died on his estate "Col Alto" near Lexington on August 24, 1851. He was interred in Presbyterian Cemetery.

McDowell was the brother-in-law of Senator Thomas Hart Benton. McDowell County, Virginia (now part of West Virginia) was formed in 1858 and named in honor of Governor McDowell.

Political offices
Preceded by John Munford Gregory; Acting Governor	Governor of Virginia; 1843–1846	Succeeded by William Smith
U.S. House of Representatives
Preceded by William Taylor	Member of the U.S. House of Representatives from Virginia's 11th congressional district March 6, 1846 – March 3, 1851	Succeeded by John Letcher
