= Charles T. Hinde =

American industrialist (1832–1915)

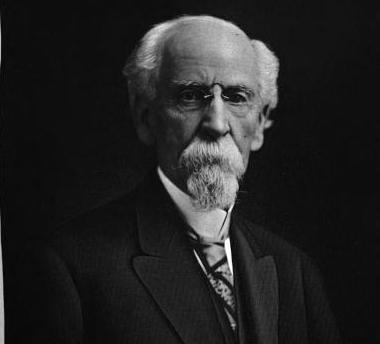
- Born: July 12, 1832; Urbana, Ohio
- Died: March 10, 1915 (aged 82); Coronado, California
- Resting place: Mount Hope Cemetery, San Diego, California
- Education: Indiana Asbury University (renamed Depauw University in 1884) (dropped out)
- Occupations: Business magnate, philanthropist
- Known for: Co-founding the Hotel del Coronado
- Board member of: Coronado Beach Company; Spreckels Bros. Commercial Co. Halliday Brothers; Galena, Dubuque and St. Paul Packet Co. St. Louis & Memphis Packet Co. Baltimore and Ohio Railroad; Chesapeake and Ohio Railroad; Global Grain & Milling Co. San Diego Electric Railway Co. Hinde, Verhoeff, & Co. Chas. T. Hinde & Co
- Spouse: Eliza Halliday
- Children: Camilla Hinde
- Parent(s): Thomas S. Hinde and Sara Cavileer Hinde
- Relatives: Dr. Thomas Hinde (grandfather); Edmund C. Hinde (brother); Frederick Hinde Zimmerman (nephew); Harry Hinde (nephew); William P. Halliday (brother-in-law); Charles H. Constable (uncle)

Charles T. Hinde (July 12, 1832 – March 10, 1915) was an American industrialist, tycoon, riverboat captain, businessman, and entrepreneur. He managed many businesses and invested in numerous business ventures over the course of his life. Hinde served in executive leadership positions in the river navigation, shipping, railroad, and hotel businesses. By his late forties, Hinde had already amassed a great fortune from his work in the steamboat and railroad industries.

In the late 1880s Hinde was invited to San Diego by his close friend E. S. Babcock to invest in and run several businesses, including the Hotel del Coronado and the Spreckels Brothers Commercial Company with John D. Spreckels. Hinde vastly increased his personal fortune during his time in southern California, and he helped spur the economy of the region. Towards the end of his life he donated much of his wealth to further various projects in the Californian city of Coronado and its surrounding area, some dedicated to the memory of his daughter Camilla, who died in Evansville, Indiana, at the age of 13.

== Early years ==
Hinde was born in Urbana, Ohio, on July 12, 1832. He was one of six children born to Thomas S. Hinde (1785–1846) and Sara Cavileer Hinde (1791–1847). His grandfather was Dr. Thomas Hinde (1737–1828) who had distinguished himself during the American Revolutionary War and during his service to General James Wolfe. During the early years of Hinde's life the family was constantly on the move, because his father was a circuit preacher of the Methodist faith and was speculating in military real estate in the territories purchased from the Native Americans by Willam Henry Harrison. Eventually, Hinde's father purchased a large tract of land in southern Illinois where he founded a town and settled with his family.

Hinde attended elementary and middle school in Mount Carmel, Illinois, a town his father founded in 1815. The Hinde family were large landowners in Mount Carmel and Wabash County, Illinois. A portion of the family land was located on the Wabash River and included Hanging Rock and the Grand Rapids Dam. Hinde attended Indiana Asbury University (now DePauw University) in Greencastle for a year and a half before dropping out following the deaths of his father and mother. (Note: Historians believe that Hinde attended the university because his father was a close friend of Francis Asbury (1745–1816), a fellow leader in the Methodist community.) Hinde, his brother Edmund C. Hinde, and his sister Belinda Hinde were forced to live with other relatives or fend for themselves. For a short time in the 1850s, Hinde and his younger sister Belinda lived with their older sister, Martha, and her husband, Judge Charles H. Constable, in Mount Carmel and in Marshall, Illinois. As a college dropout, Hinde was initially only able to find work as a grocery clerk in Vincennes and later as a clerk in Mount Carmel. Even though these were low-paying jobs, Hinde was able to support himself because he had inherited large land holdings from his father.

== Employment in river navigation ==
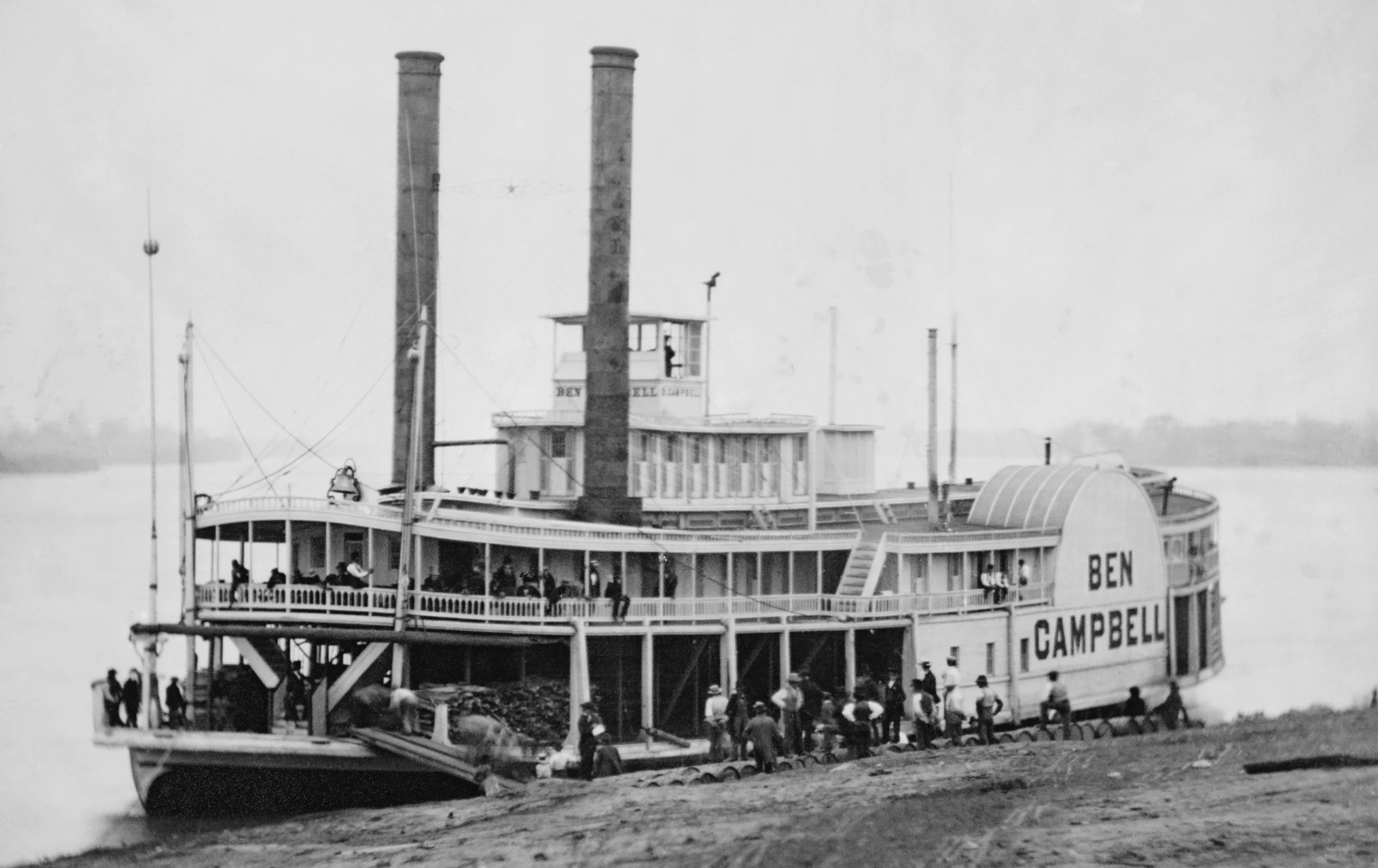
A steamboat of the type used on the Mississippi river system, from an 1850s daguerreotype

Hinde's first employment in river transportation was as a clerk on a boat that operated between St. Louis, Missouri, and St. Paul, Minnesota. After about a year, he joined the Galena, Dubuque and St. Paul Packet Company, which became one of the largest transportation companies in that part of the country. At one point during his employment there, he contracted cholera and almost died. Hinde made rapid advancement and was promoted to the position of captain in his mid-twenties, an unusually young age. In 1862, he went to Louisville, Kentucky, to take command of a steamer running from there to Memphis, Tennessee. He returned to St. Louis in 1864 to serve as captain of the steamer Davenport, which ran from St. Louis to St. Paul, before resigning that position to organize a branch of the Halliday Brothers Corporation in Cairo, Illinois, which was engaged in the river transportation and shipping businesses. He subsequently established his own business and became the shipping agent at the Cairo wharf for all the steamboat lines passing through Cairo, on both the Ohio River and Mississippi River and their tributaries. Hinde sold his interests in the business shortly after its creation and moved his family to Evansville, Indiana, where he became acquainted with E. S. Babcock and the Reid Brothers.

== Railroad business ==
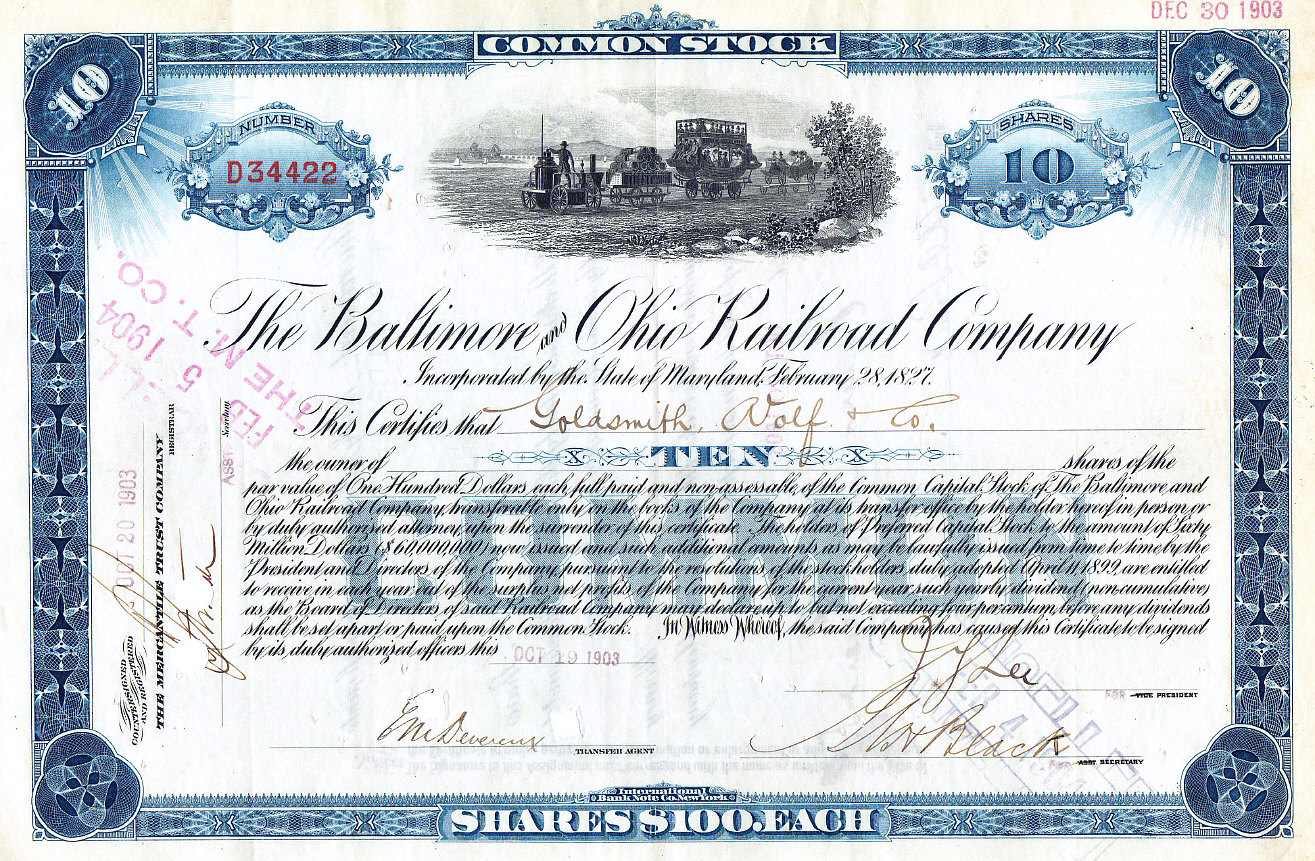
B & O stock certificate, 1903

Steamboats began to see strong competition from the railroads after the post-Civil War replacement of the rail lines, and after a brief episode of poor health in 1870, Hinde sold his interests in the river navigation business and turned his attention to railroads. He went to Louisville, Kentucky, to rest, and by chance became a shipping agent for the Baltimore and Ohio Railroad Company through his close relationship with several company executives. Hinde secured various contracts for hauling grain, a business he may have gained some insight into from his brother Edmund C. Hinde (1830–1909), who was then active in the grain business in their hometown of Mount Carmel. But the endeavor was unsuccessful, and the Baltimore and Ohio Railroad went into receivership; Hinde arranged to have all his shipments transferred to the Chesapeake and Ohio Railroad Company. Shortly before he received an invitation from E. S. Babcock to move to Coronado, California, Hinde's only child, Camilla, died in Evansville at the age of 13. Babcock had founded the Hotel del Coronado and several large companies, and invited Hinde to invest and help manage his business interests. Hinde had been engaged in the railroad business for a little under a decade when he left for southern California to invest with John Diedrich Spreckels and E. S. Babcock in the real estate and hotel businesses. In the following years, Hinde and Spreckels launched numerous successful business ventures together and became good friends.

== Southern California ==
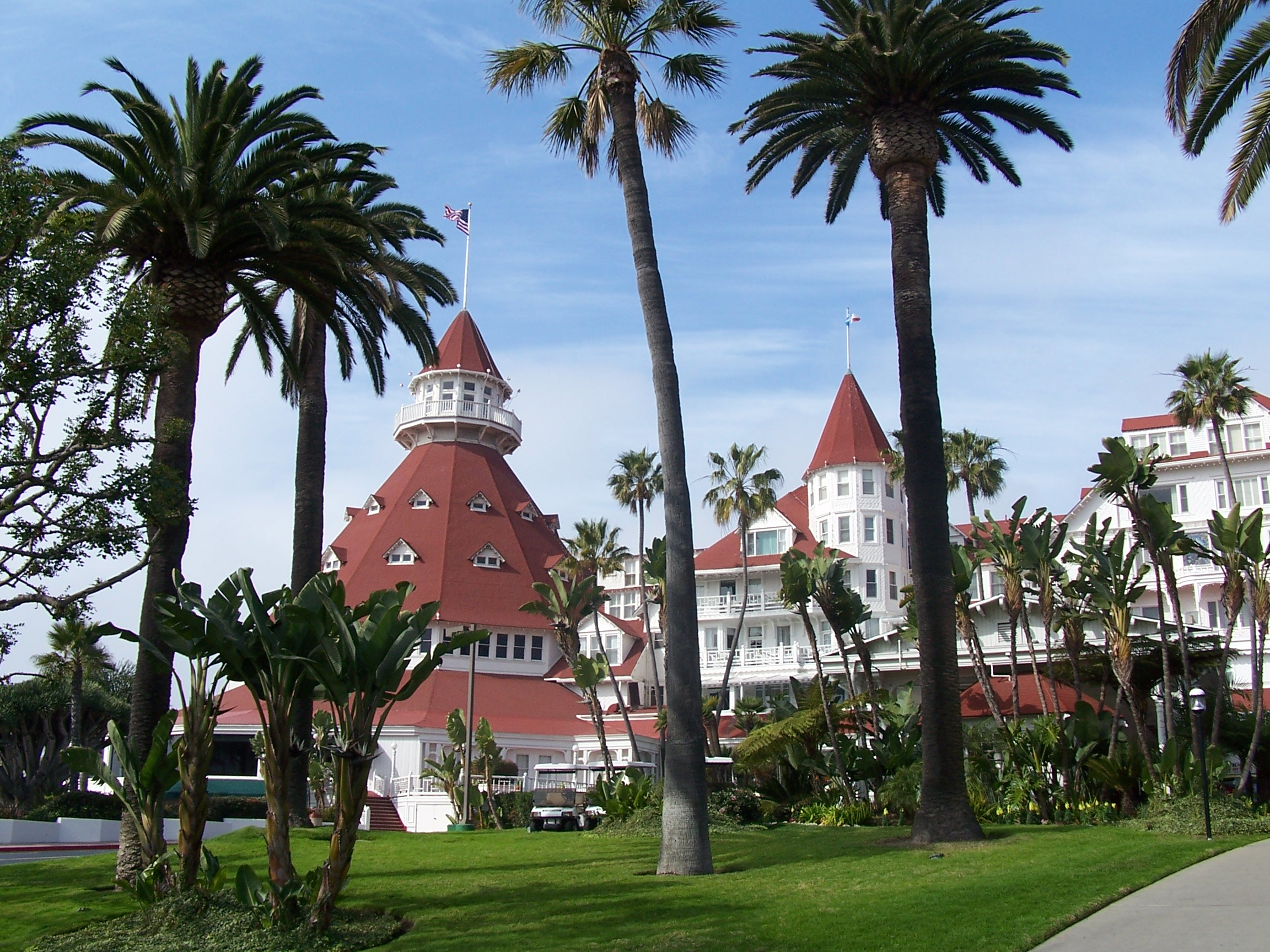
Front view of the Hotel del Coronado

In Evansville, Hinde had become acquainted with the Reid Brothers, who designed many notable structures there, including the Willard Library. When Hinde and Babcock left Evansville and relocated to Coronado, they took the Reid Brothers with them, and hired them to design many structures including the Hotel del Coronado. Hinde also used the Reid brothers for personal projects, such as his home in Coronado and the church and rectory he built in the town. All three structures still stand today. Hinde may have used his friendship with the Reid Brothers to get them to design the Grand Rapids Hotel, which was owned by his nephew, Frederick Hinde Zimmerman. The building burned down in 1929.

In California, Hinde again became involved in various businesses and investments. Initially, he was the commercial agent and manager for the Santa Fe Wharf, working with Spreckels and Babcock. Later, he was one of the founders of the Spreckels Brothers Commercial Company, owning a one-third interest. The company imported coal, cement, and general merchandise. Hinde's most important and lasting investment was the Hotel del Coronado on Rancho San Diego Island, which was owned by the Coronado Beach Company, originally capitalized with US$3 million. At the time of capitalization the company directors were Babcock, Spreckels, Hinde, H .W. Mallett, and Giles Kellogg. They formed the company on April 7, 1886, and started construction on the hotel. The company also undertook numerous other investments in the Coronado area, but their plans were interrupted by the Panic of 1893, a severe recession and bank run caused by a bubble in the railroad business. The economy did not begin to recover until 1897, and after a multiple year slump the property market in southern California began to recover. As with his original switch from the navigation to railroad business, Hinde's move from railroads to hotels dramatically increased his personal fortune. From its founding until his death in 1915, Hinde remained vice president and treasurer of the Coronado Beach Company and the Spreckels Brothers Commercial Company.

== Later life and legacy ==
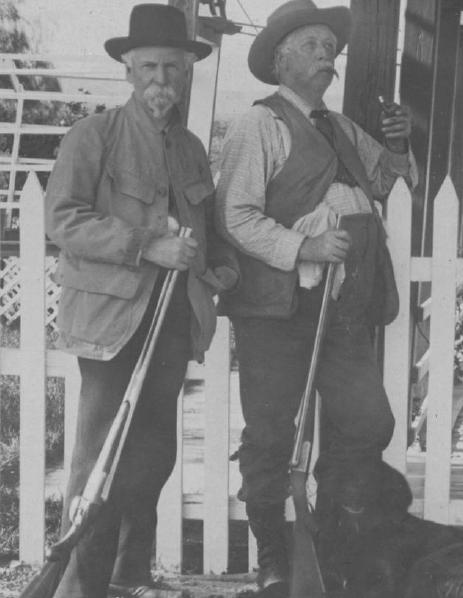
Captain Hinde and President William Howard Taft at Hinde's Ranch in California

At the age of 72, Hinde began to invest in property and mines in New Mexico as a hobby. Primarily, Hinde used his nephews, Harry Hinde and Frederick Hinde Zimmerman, to alert him to new business opportunities. The local newspapers reported on his investments, but he only experienced modest profits.

Hinde bought the most expensive car on offer at the 1910 California Auto Show, a mammoth 72-horse power Thomas Flyer manufactured by the Thomas Motor Company. He tendered a check for $6,200 and drove the car back to one of his residences in San Diego, California.

Hinde was well connected among the elite businessmen and politicians of the time, owing to his extensive business interests. One of his closest friends was James J. Hill of the Pacific Railroad, with whom he became acquainted while working in the railroad business. Hinde was politically neutral, but towards the end of his life he began to support Republican political candidates, at the urging of his nephew, Harry Hinde, a Republican politician. During the 1912 presidential election, Hinde entertained President William Howard Taft, a Republican, at his home in Coronado; Taft was at the time campaigning for re-election for the presidency of the United States against Teddy Roosevelt and Woodrow Wilson. Taft and his host went hunting and horse riding, and Hinde introduced Taft to many of his friends and business acquaintances. President Taft lost the election.

Towards the end of his life, Hinde gave to many charities in southern California, and he was particularly generous to Coronado and San Diego.. He funded the construction of Christ Episcopal Church in Coronado, together with its parish center and rectory, all dedicated to his deceased daughter, Camilla. Even though Hinde was generous in his gifts, he remained modest and low-key throughout his life. He did not like receiving credit for his philanthropy, perhaps the reason his contributions were overlooked in the years following his death. Hinde bequeathed a large part of his estate to his sister Belinda's son, Frederick Hinde Zimmerman, who used the money to build the Grand Rapids Hotel on the Hinde family farm in Mount Carmel. Hinde left an even larger portion of his estate and his house in Coronado to his nephew, Harry Hinde.

Hinde died in Coronado on March 10, 1915, aged 82. In accordance with his wishes, the funeral service held in the Episcopal Church that he built for the residents of Coronado was modest. Hinde is buried in Mount Hope Cemetery, San Diego, California. His estate papers show that in addition to his other businesses, Hinde was a part-owner of the Los Angeles-based Global Grain & Milling Company, founded in 1898 and run by Will E. Keller.
