= Edmund C. Hinde =

American gold miner and laborer

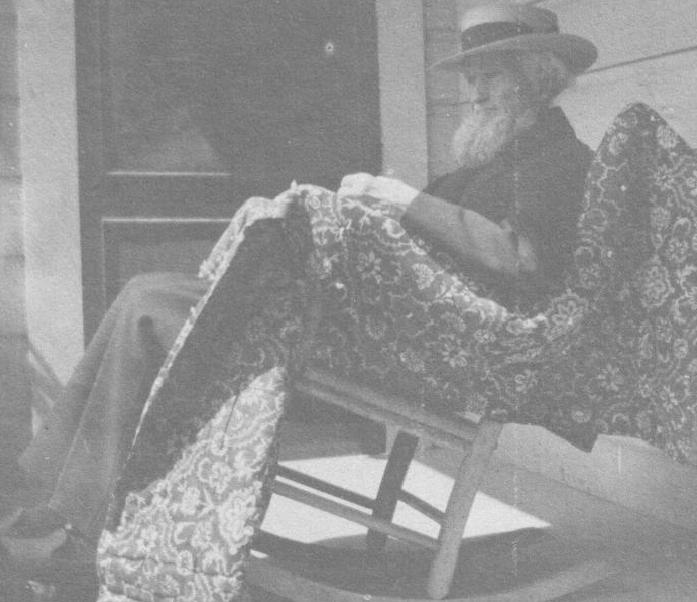
- Born: April 6, 1830; Urbana, Ohio
- Died: December 20, 1909 (aged 79); Riverside, California
- Occupations: Miner; Historian
- Children: Harry Hinde
- Parent(s): Thomas S. Hinde; Sara Cavileer Hinde
- Relatives: Dr. Thomas Hinde (grandfather); Judge Charles H. Constable (uncle); Charles T. Hinde (brother); Frederick Hinde Zimmerman (nephew)

Edmund C. Hinde (April 6, 1830 – December 20, 1909) was a gold miner and laborer. His life was, at times, extremely difficult and filled with various hardships due to his career as a gold prospector in the 1850s. Throughout most of his adult life Hinde kept detailed diaries on his daily activities. After his death, his son, Harry Hinde, donated the diaries to the California State Library. The diaries have provided a wealth of information on a variety of topics, in particular on the California Gold Rush.

== Early years ==
Edmund C. Hinde was the son of Thomas S. Hinde and he was born in Urbana, Champaign County, Ohio on April 6, 1830.

Thomas S. Hinde had been a very prominent newspaper publisher, real estate developer, and Methodist minister. The Hinde family was well known in Ohio, Kentucky, and Illinois.

Like his other brothers and sisters Edmund grew up in Mount Carmel, Illinois. Edmund's father and mother died early and he and his brothers and sisters were forced to either live with other family or fend for themselves. Edmund and his other siblings lived with their older sister Martha and her husband Judge Charles H. Constable during the 1850s. After the death of his parents Edmund was briefly responsible for caring for his younger sister. Once he found suitable accommodations for his sister Edmund left Mount Carmel and took on a variety of menial jobs. He eventually left to mine for gold in California.

== California gold mining ==
In 1850 Hinde began his trip to California to look for gold. The trip was harsh and Hinde met with many difficulties on the way to California. Eventually, Edmund and the other prospectors who traveled with him made it to California and they had limited success in mining gold. However, the experience was so challenging that Hinde only stayed a short time gold mining before returning to the Midwest. In his journal Hinde stated that he was swindled out of a large amount of money when he tried to sell the gold he mined upon his return.

== Later years ==
Following Hinde's time prospecting gold during the California Gold Rush he went to Canada for a number of years. It was reported in his obituary that while in Canada he was connected with Fort Edmonton. After his time in Canada Hinde returned to various locations in Illinois. Eventually he settled in his hometown of Mount Carmel and was involved in the grain business for the remainder of his life. Four years before Hinde died he moved to Riverside, California and stayed with his son Harry Hinde. Edmund is buried in Evergreen Memorial Park and Mausoleum in Riverside.

== Additional information ==
Hinde wrote extensive journals during his life. Part of his journals were donated after his death by his son Harry to the State of California. In 1983 Jerome Peltier edited and published a selection of the journals that related to his experiences with the California Gold Rush. Additionally, Edmund is repeatedly mentioned in the journals of his father, Thomas S. Hinde, which are among the Draper Manuscripts held by the Wisconsin Historical Society.
