= William McIntosh (fur trader) =

- Born: c. 1760; Aberdeen, Scotland
- Died: July 1832; Mount Carmel, Illinois
- Occupations: fur trader, real estate entrepreneur
- Spouse: Lydia McIntosh

Signature
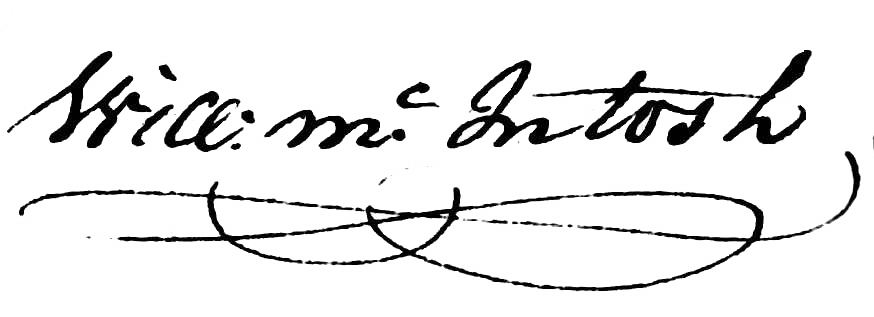

William McIntosh (c. 1760 – July 1832; also printed as "M‘Intosh") (Note: McIntosh signed his own name as "Will: m.^{c}Intosh" (William McIntosh). At the time, "Mac-" surnames where often abbreviated with a superscript letter c (M^{c}), which was often approximated on printing presses using a turned comma (M‘) when superscript characters were not available. (A turned comma, unlike an apostrophe, curls to the right like the letter c.) Significantly, in Johnson v. McIntosh, the United States Reports printed McIntosh's surname as "M‘Intosh", in line with other cases like McCulloch v. Maryland (printed as "M‘Culloch"). But in modern cases, such as County of Oneida v. Oneida Indian Nation of New York State (1985), the Supreme Court now prints this as "McIntosh".) was a fur trader, treasurer of the Indiana Territory under William Henry Harrison, and real estate entrepreneur. He became famous for the United States Supreme Court case of Johnson v. McIntosh (1823) and for his massive real estate holdings on the Wabash River.

For a time he was a close friend of William Henry Harrison, but their relationship eventually soured and Harrison sued him for slander. When Harrison won the lawsuit, McIntosh was forced to pay him a large sum of money.

== Early years ==
William McIntosh was born in Aberdeen, Scotland around 1760. In Scotland he served as a lieutenant in the Northern Fencibles from 1778 to 1781 and then emigrated to Canada. In 1785 he moved to Vincennes, Indiana and operated as a fur trader in the Illinois country along the Wabash River. About 1815-20 he moved to a tract of land he owned on the Illinois side of the Wabash River, near the present site of Mount Carmel, Illinois. It is thought that he resided near where the Grand Rapids Dam was built in the 1890s. Thomas S. Hinde, one of the founders of Mount Carmel, later purchased this property.

== Fur trader and agent ==
McIntosh operated in the Illinois country of the Northwest Territory in association with the fur trading company of John Askin in Detroit. His primary residence was located in Vincennes, Indiana. Certain sources claim that his methods were deceptive and he was able to acquire vast land holdings by profiting unfairly from other people. He claimed to own 11,560 acres around the Wabash River.

== Marriage and family ==
McIntosh lived with Lydia, a former slave. At one time, they had to fight off litigation regarding her status from individuals in Knox County, Indiana trying to claim her as property. McIntosh had two daughters and one son by Lydia.

== Johnson v. McIntosh ==
Johnson v. McIntosh (1823) is a notable Supreme Court case that held that private citizens could not purchase lands from Native Americans; it affirmed the relationship between the tribes and the United States government. The decision was written by Chief Justice John Marshall, who was a close friend of Thomas S. Hinde. The latter later purchased a substantial portion of the property that was in question in the litigation.

McIntosh had obtained a land patent from the United States government, while Johnson's descendants had inherited the land from a purchase he had made directly from the Piankeshaw Indians. The court ruling rendered the Johnson purchase invalid, as he had no authority to buy land from the Piankeshaw after the United States had formed as a nation. In short, McIntosh won based on Marshall's creation of the discovery doctrine.

== Death and additional information ==
On July 14, 1832, the Vincennes Gazette reported: "Died--at the Grand Rapids of the Wabash, William McIntosh Esq. for a long time resident of Vincennes. He was a native of Scotland, from which country he emigrated at an early age." According to one report, Lydia and her children inherited none of McIntosh's land holdings and were left destitute.
