= Mount Hope Cemetery (San Diego) =

Cemetery in San Diego, California

Coordinates: 32°42′36″N 117°06′46″W

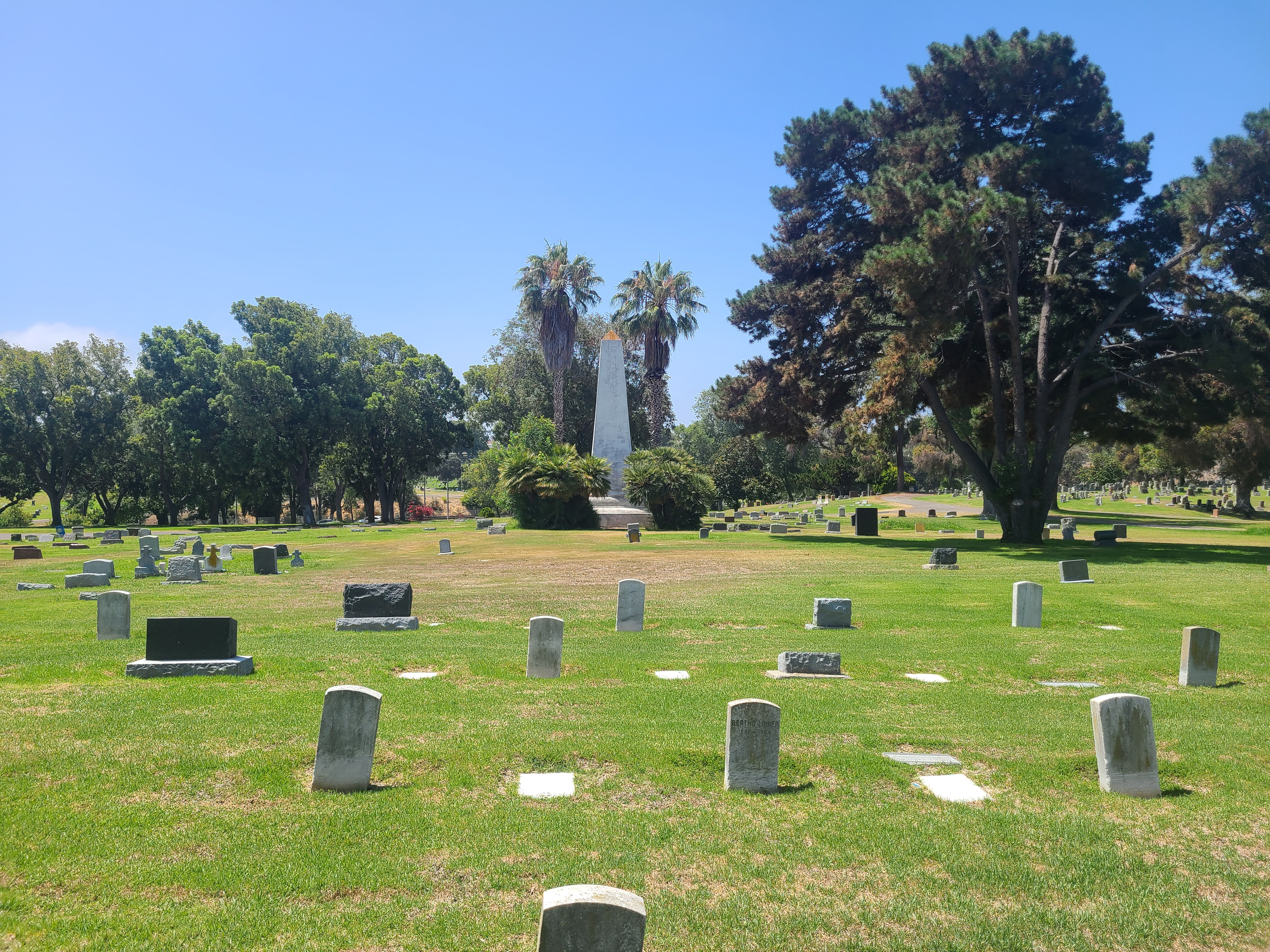
- Monument of the Fraternal Order of Eagles at Mount Hope Cemetery
- Interactive map of Mount Hope Cemetery

Details
- Established: 1869
- Location: San Diego, California
- Country: United States
- Size: 115 acres
- Website: Mount Hope Cemetery / Parks & Recreation

Mount Hope Cemetery is a cemetery in San Diego, California. It is believed to be named for its rolling hills and distant bay views; the community of Mount Hope adopted the name as well. It is adjacent to Greenwood Memorial Park.

== History ==
Founded in 1869 on what was then the outskirts of New Town, Mount Hope now covers approximately 115 acres (0.47 km^{2}). Its design is an example of a rural cemetery, in architecture, art and landscaping. The city of San Diego manages and maintains it, providing perpetual care to all burial sites. The rolling hills contain monuments to some of the city's most notable former residents.

== Notable interments ==
- E. S. Babcock (1848–1922), real estate mogul, built the Hotel del Coronado
- Samuel Brannan (1819–1889), early Mormon pioneer, first millionaire of the California Gold Rush, member of San Francisco's first city council
- Hick Carpenter (1855–1937), American baseball player
- Raymond Chandler (1888–1959), author of crime stories and novels, created detective Philip Marlowe
- Benjamin T. Frederick (1834–1903), politician, miner and real estate agent from Iowa and California
- Charles T. Hinde (1832–1915), industrialist, riverboat captain, businessman, and original investor of the Hotel del Coronado.
- Alonzo Horton (1813–1909), founder of modern San Diego, namesake of Horton Plaza
- Alta M. Hulett (1854–1877), one of America's first female attorneys
- John F. Kinney (1816–1902), American attorney, judge and politician
- Almeda Lambert (1863–1921), American cookbook writer and businessperson
- George Marston (1850–1946), involved with establishing Balboa Park, the San Diego Public Library System, and the Serra Museum
- Kate Morgan (1865–1892), Iowa woman and purported ghost
- Kate Sessions (1857–1940), San Diego's pioneering horticulturist
- Matthew Sherman (1827–1898), land developer, San Diego pioneer, mayor from 1891 to 1893
- Walter R. Taliaferro (1880–1915), aviator
- Thomas Whaley (1823–1890), early settler
- Robert Waterman (1826–1891), Governor of California from 1887 to 1891
