= Kentucky's 13th congressional district =

Coordinates: 38°30′N 85°00′W

- Obsolete district
- Created: 1830
- Eliminated: 1840
- Years active: 1833–1843

Kentucky's 13th congressional district was a district of the United States House of Representatives in Kentucky. It was lost to redistricting in 1843. Its last representative was William O. Butler.

== List of members representing the district ==
Member	Party	Years	Cong ress	Electoral history
District created March 4, 1833
Richard M. Johnson (Great Crossings)	Jacksonian	March 4, 1833 – March 3, 1837	23rd 24th	Redistricted from the 5th district and re-elected in 1833. Re-elected in 1835. Retired to run for Vice President.
William W. Southgate (Covington)	Whig	March 4, 1837 – March 3, 1839	25th	Elected in 1837. Lost re-election.
William O. Butler (Carrollton)	Democratic	March 4, 1839 – March 3, 1843	26th 27th	Elected in 1839. Re-elected in 1841. Retired.
District eliminated March 3, 1843
