= Charleston riot =

1864 disturbance in Charleston, Illinois

Charleston Riot
- Part of Illinois in the American Civil War
- Date: March 28, 1864
- Location: Charleston, Illinois

Parties
Union Army; Republicans	Copperheads

Number
6 Union soldiers killed 1 bystander killed	2 local Copperheads killed

Casualties
- Deaths: 9
- Injuries: 12
- Arrested: 50

The Charleston riot occurred on March 28, 1864, in Charleston, Illinois, after Union soldiers who were home on leave and local Republicans clashed with local anti war Democrats known as Copperheads. By the time the violent confrontation had ended, six Union soldiers and three civilians were killed and twelve others were wounded in what was one of the deadliest Civil War riots in the North. Besides the New York City draft riots of 1863, the Charleston Riot resulted in the greatest number of casualties of any such event in the North during the American Civil War. Fifty individuals would be initially arrested following the incident.

Political and personal animosities exemplified the clash of cultural differences in the North and especially in Coles County, Illinois during the time of the riot. These relations would ultimately boil over in the form of the Charleston riot that would become national news, being highlighted in notable papers such as the Chicago Tribune, New York World, and Richmond Examiner.

Civil-versus-military control and personal relationships from Illinois would lead to President Abraham Lincoln’s involvement in the aftermath. Lincoln had direct ties to Charleston. Notably, one of the famous Lincoln-Douglas debates occurred at the Charleston fairgrounds. Lincoln practiced law In Charleston and knew many residents. His father and stepmother also resided in Coles County, and he owned property there.

The aftermath of the riot centered around fifteen prisoners detained after the riot who became pawns in the struggle between the military who wanted to try them as an example to deter future insurrections, and the efforts of family and local supporters who appealed to the president for resolution through civil proceedings. Ultimately, Lincoln would set the prisoners free on November 4, 1864, after months of discourse and indecision.

== Tensions in Coles County Before the Riot ==
Coles County was a contrasting blend of immigrants from the democratic, agricultural south, particularly Kentucky, along with those from the East Coast, who had originally settled in the area during the early 1800's. Many of these families from Kentucky were of Irish and Scottish descent, some tracing back their service to the American Revolutionary War. By the 1860s, Coles County was home to a rich, interrelated community which included some successful farmers. Its residents were in a sea of discontent for reasons including the economic hardships that came with the suffering of the Southern markets, the drafting of soldiers into the Union Army, the growing divide between Democrats and Republicans in local/national politics, and the overall bleak situation of the war. Many of the local Copperheads were among those who were particularly frustrated with the war.

Although the Charleston Riot is often considered as the marking of the pinnacle of the political tensions that existed during that time, there were other notable encounters that occurred beforehand that intensified the situation. In the face of the upcoming election, the Copperheads increased their political activity. This drove the political divide to violent levels. While Union soldiers were home on leave, there were reported incidents where they, after consuming corn whiskey, would force Democrats they saw around to get down on their knees and swear allegiance to the Union. On January 29, 1864, prominent citizens Judge Charles H. Constable and Dr. J. W. Dora became their target. The following day, in Mattoon, Illinois, Charles Shoalmax of the 17th Illinois Cavalry shot and killed Copperhead Edwards Stevens.

The level of violence in Charleston itself leading up to the riot was not as severe, but still significant. On March 26, two Copperheads were attacked and disarmed. Earlier that month, two Democrats also took a severe beating from Union Soldiers.

== Riot Day ==
Picture from 1864 that shows the Charleston, IL courthouse where the riot took place outside of.

The news coverage of the event stated that the Peace Democrats were responsible for beginning the event. One such news source, from the Chicago Tribune, later reprinted in the Charleston Courier, labeled Nelson Wells as the instigator of the conflict. Most articles published from the time, insist that the whole event transpired as a more spontaneous event and was not directly prompted by any one individual. The most likely explanation is that the event occurred because a sizable presence of both Copperheads and Union soldiers had been in town that day. Many sources speculate that a sizable portion of the participants, at least on the side of the Peace Democrats, had been drinking quite heavily all day, and this led to the outbreak that resulted in the confrontation. Also, one of the events that is noted to have influenced the riot was the treatment of Judge Charles H. Constable by Union soldiers in January 1864 in Mattoon, Illinois. The soldiers humiliated Constable by making him swear allegiance to the federal government, due to his decision to allow four Union deserters to go free in Marshall, Illinois in March 1863. When the riot began, Judge Constable was holding court in Charleston.

== Aftermath ==
At any rate, the fighting only lasted a few moments. But by the time the affair was over, the Copperheads had been run out of Charleston. Rewards had been issued for the capture of any of those whom fled the scene. Included in those who left town, was John O’Hair, the leader of the Copperheads, who had been the sheriff of Coles County. Out of those killed, only two had been Copperheads, Nelson Wells and John Cooper; the other participants had been either captured or escaped. Other Union troops were called in from Mattoon to assist the soldiers fighting in Charleston, but by the time their train arrived, none of the instigators were left in the town. Fifteen prisoners were eventually held for seven months, initially in Springfield, Illinois. President Lincoln, whose father and stepmother had lived in Coles County, waived the prisoners' right to Habeas Corpus and ordered their removal to Fort Delaware in the East. He ordered their release on November 4, 1864. Two of the prisoners had been indicted for murder and were exonerated by trial in December 1864. Twelve other Copperheads had also been indicted for murder. They were never captured, and the indictments were annulled in May 1873.

== Coles County Copperheads ==
Coles County, Illinois, 1875.

The Copperheads represented a political affiliation that was staunchly opposed to President Lincoln, the draft, and abolition of slavery. This group favored an armistice to end the Civil War because they opposed the war itself. Most components of Copperhead ideology centered on the mistrust of the implications the war presented to American society. In particular, the aim to free the slaves had become an issue that some white natives of Illinois took issue with. The Civil War had split the country into factions, either side chose to support or oppose the aim to reincorporate the Southern states back into the Union. The Copperheads believed the Lincoln Administration had been out of line by abolishing slavery. Some citizens of Coles County accepted the ideology that it was not in the best interest of the country to free the slaves.

In the end, the Charleston Riot provides a good example of how local events of Coles County history have fit into national currents as well. The Copperheads of Coles County had been different from other dissenting groups from around the country, in that they chose to use physical violence as their method of dissent. By killing Union soldiers, who had become the emblem of Federal government control, the Copperheads were attempting to project their anger toward the government. The draft, a strong central government, and racism fueled the Copperheads support within the county. In March 1864, these national tensions boiled over in the small town of Charleston, creating one of the most interesting events in the history of the county.

== Casualties & Wounded ==
Casualties
Name	Home	Affiliation
Shubal York	Paris, IL	Major, surgeon, 54th IL Infantry
Alfred Swim	Casey, IL	Private, G Company, 54th IL Infantry
James Goodrich	Charleston, IL	Private, C Company, 54th IL Infantry
William G. Hart	Charleston, IL	Deputy Provost Marshall, 62nd IL Infantry
Oliver Sallee	Charleston, Il	Private, C Company, 54th IL Infantry
John Neer	Martinsville, IL	Private, G Company, 54th IL Infantry
John Jenkins	Charleston, IL	Innocent Bystander
John Cooper	Salisbury, IL	Copperhead
Nelson Wells	Paris, IL	Copperhead

Wounded
Name	Home	Affiliation
Greenville M. Mitchell	Charleston, IL	Colonel, 54th IL Infantry
William H. Decker	Greenup, IL	Private, G Company, 54th IL Infantry
George Ross	Charleston, IL	Private, C Company, 54th IL Infantry
Lansford Noyes	N/A	Private, I Company, 54th IL Infantry
Thomas Jefferies	Charleston, IL	Republican
William Gilman	Charleston, IL	Republican
John Trimble	Charleston, IL	Republican
George Jefferson Collins	Coles County, IL	Copperhead
John W. Herndon	Coles County, IL	Copperhead
Benjamin F. Rardin	Coles County, IL	Copperhead
Robert Winkler	Coles County, IL	Copperhead
Young E. Winkler	Coles County, IL	Copperhead
John H. O'Hair	Coles County, IL	Sherriff of Coles Co, Copperhead (left off of official report; died later)

Rumors have persisted that death totals were larger. One story is that five coffins were later acquired by the Copperheads to accommodate additional dead. Several of the rioters disappeared, possibly leaving the area and changing their identity, or lying somewhere in unmarked graves.

== 54th Illinois Infantry Regiment ==
The Adjutant General's Report records the event:

″January 1864, three-fourths of the Regiment re-enlisted, as veteran volunteers, and were mustered February 9, 1864. Left for Mattoon, Illinois, for veteran furlough, March 28. Veteran furlough having expired, the Regiment re-assembled at Mattoon. The same day an organized gang of Copperheads, led by Sheriff O’Hair, attacked some men of the Regiment at Charleston, killing Major Shubal York, Surgeon, and four privates, and wounding Colonel G. M. Mitchell. One hour later the Regiment arrived from Mattoon and occupied the town, capturing some of the most prominent traitors.″

== Further Readings ==
- https://publish.illinois.edu/ihlc-blog/2020/03/31/the-charleston-riot-of-1864/
- https://www.dailyeasternnews.com/2012/03/22/the-charleston-riot-of-1864/
- https://www.hmdb.org/m.asp?m=188295
- https://www.eiu.edu/localite/cclhpcopperheads.php
- https://presidentlincoln.illinois.gov/Blog/Posts/110/Illinois-History/2021/3/A-Street-Battle-in-Charleston/blog-post/
- https://findingaids.lib.umich.edu/catalog/umich-wcl-M-1730cha
- https://mattoonhistorycenter.org/index.php?page=stories&group=Civ

== See also ==
- List of homicides in Illinois
- List of incidents of civil unrest in the United States
- List of Battles Fought in Illinois

== Sources ==
- Barry, Peter J. The Charleston, Illinois Riot, March 28, 1864, 3 Road Lake Park, Champaign, IL. 2007.
- Barry, Peter J. “The Charleston Riot and Its Aftermath: Civil, Military, and Presidential Responses.” Journal of Illinois History 7, no. 2 (2004): 82–106.
- Coleman, Charles H., and Paul H. Spence. “The Charleston Riot, March 28, 1864.” Journal of the Illinois State Historical Society 33, no. 1 (March 1940): 7–56.
- Sampson, Robert D., "Pretty Damned Warm Times: The 1864 Charleston Riot and 'The Inalienable Right of Revolution.'" Illinois Historical Journal 89 no. 2 (Summer 1996): 99–116.
- Towne, Stephen E. (Spring 2006). "Such conduct must be put down: The Military Arrest of Judge Charles H. Constable during the Civil War". Journal of Illinois History. 9 (2): 43–62.
- Wilson, Charles Edward, History of Coles County, Illinois. Chicago, 1905.
