= E. S. Babcock =

American industrialist (1848–1922)

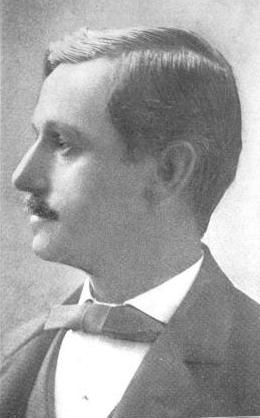
- Born: Elisha Spurr Babcock Jr. May 1, 1848; Evansville, Indiana
- Died: September 1, 1922 (aged 74); Coronado, California
- Resting place: Mount Hope Cemetery, San Diego, California
- Education: Evansville High School
- Occupation: Real estate mogul
- Known for: Co-founding the Hotel del Coronado
- Board member of: Coronado Beach Company, San Diego Electric Railway Company,
- Spouse: Isabella Graham Babcock

Elisha Spurr Babcock (May 1, 1848 – September 1, 1922) was an industrialist, tycoon, businessman, and entrepreneur. He is most famous for founding the Hotel del Coronado.

== Biography ==
Born to businessman Elisha Spurr Babcock Sr. (born 1815 at Utica, NY, settled in Evansville in 1838), and Agnes Southerland Davidson, a Scotland native. They had eight children; Oliver, Louisa, Elisha Spurr Jr., William D., Edgar, Frank, Amelia and John. Elisha Spurr Babcock Sr. shut his business in Evansville and went to San Diego in 1887.

E. S. Babcock Jr. was born on May 1, 1848, in Evansville, Indiana, where he was raised, he graduated from Evansville High School. From the outset of his career he was active in business and started many business ventures. Babcock's first job was with the Evansville and Terre Haute Railroad, commencing as a freight clerk at the Evansville depot, and working himself up to the position of general freight agent of the road.

Eventually Babcock left the railroad service to engage in developing the Bell Telephone Company, which controlled a large territory extending from Evansville to New Orleans; at the same time he held sole ownership of the Eugene Ice Company, with some five large houses and a number of agencies, and was a partner in the firm of E. S. Babcock & Son. It is generally thought that Babcock became acquainted with Charles T. Hinde in Evansville during the 1870s.

He died on September 1, 1922. He was married to Isabella Graham Babcock (died 1932).

== Hotel del Coronado ==
Originally Babcock came to southern California to regain his health, but when he sensed opportunity he established the Coronado Beach Company and began planning massive real estate investments. Using his training as a civil engineer he planned the construction of dams for water, and the Hotel del Coronado. Babcock and partners bought the land for $110,000 in 1885. However, the economy began to struggle and Babcock summoned his good friend Charles T. Hinde to come and help him save his investments. Through some luck John D. Spreckels decided to invest in the Santa Fe wharf in San Diego, the Hotel del Coronado, and purchase the dams. Later, Babcock, Hinde, and Spreckels, founded the Spreckels Brothers Commercial Company.

Babcock gave the William E. Ritter's "Marine Biological Association of San Diego", which later became the Scripps Institution of Oceanography, the use of Hotel Del's boathouse as a summer laboratory from 1903 to 1905.
