= Harry Hinde =

American politician

Harry H. Hinde
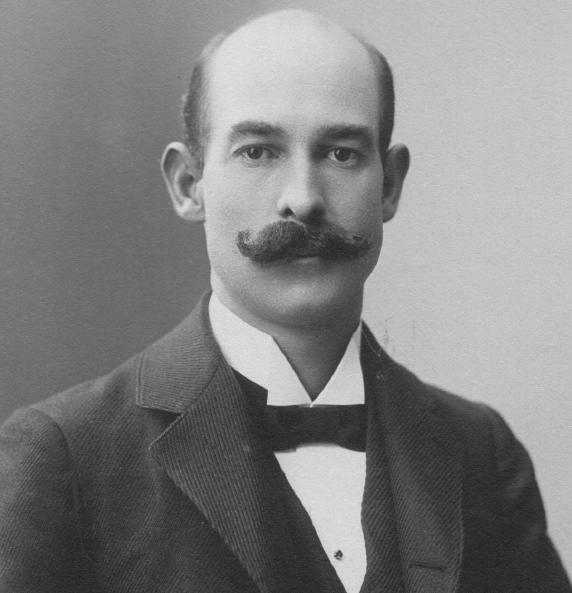
- Born: September 17, 1865; Mount Carmel, Illinois, US
- Died: September 21, 1942 (aged 77); Riverside, California, US
- Occupations: Store Owner, Entrepreneur, aircraft designer, patent holder, and Inventor
- Political party: Republican
- Spouse: Estella Hinde
- Children: Margaret Hinde Hibbs, Marion Hinde Hamilton, Charles(C.C.) Hinde, and Craven (C.K.) Hinde
- Parent(s): Edmund C. Hinde & Phoebe Martin Hinde
- Relatives: Charles T. Hinde (uncle) Thomas S. Hinde (grandfather) Dr.Thomas Hinde (great-grandfather) Frederick Hinde Zimmerman (cousin), Judge Charles H. Constable

Signature
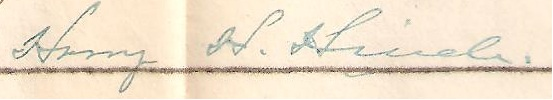

Harry H. Hinde (September 17, 1865 – September 21, 1942) was a Missouri State Representative, businessman, aircraft designer, patent holder, and inventor.

== Early years ==
Harry Hinde was the son of Edmund C. Hinde and Phobe Martin Hinde. His grandfather was Thomas S. Hinde, the founder of Mount Carmel, Illinois. Harry Hinde attended local schools in Mount Carmel. After completing his schooling, Hinde and his cousin, Frederick Hinde Zimmerman, operated a general store in Arkansas for a short time. The business failed, and they both left Arkansas in search of new business opportunities. Harry moved to Kansas City, Missouri and began work in the newspaper and printing business. He was employed in the newspaper business for three years until he was elected to public office.

== Election to Missouri State Legislature ==
Sometime before 1905, Hinde was elected to the Missouri State Legislature. He was elected as a member from Kansas City, Missouri. He served multiple terms in the legislature before eventually deciding to relocate to California in 1905. He became a citizen of Riverside, California in 1907.

== Inventor and aircraft designer ==
Hinde was an active inventor and aircraft designer during his life and received several patents. Primarily, he concentrated his efforts on inventing monoplane models of airplanes in the early 1900s. Hinde was a member of the Aero Club of California in the early 1900s. He invented a "heavier than air" machine for which he received several patents. Experts of the day claimed that the invention revolutionized aerial navigation. According to one source, Harry Hinde spent over 17 years studying aeronautics.

== Later years ==
In later years, Hinde established the Hinde Hardware Company in Riverside, California. It was a generally successful business; however, after the death of Harry's uncle, Captain Charles T. Hinde, he retired, since he received a large inheritance. As part of the inheritance from the estate of Charles T. Hinde, Harry Hinde received Captain Hinde's house, named the Kirk House, in Coronado, California, where Hinde lived with his family until 1922. Eventually, he sold the house. Hinde tried to reenter politics in 1916 by running in the primary election for state senator in the thirty-seventh district in Riverside, California, but came in third place with a total of 2,318 votes. Hinde was also listed as a Patron of the American Literary Association Officers in 1919.

Hinde is buried in Evergreen Memorial Park and Mausoleum in Riverside.
