= Thomas Hinde =

British doctor (1737–1828)

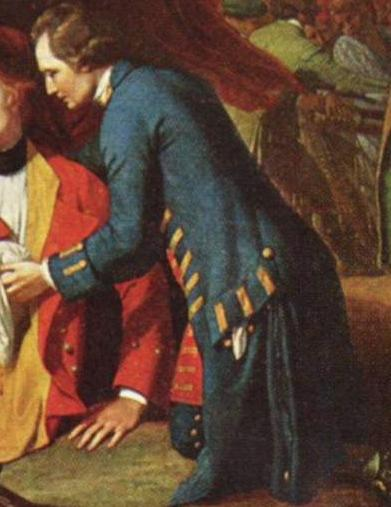
- Hinde in The Death of General Wolfe by Benjamin West, 1770
- Born: July 10, 1737; Oxfordshire, England
- Died: September 28, 1828 (aged 91); Newport, Kentucky, United States
- Education: St. Thomas's Hospital (studied under Dr Thomas Brookes) now called King's College London School of Medicine
- Occupation: medical doctor
- Spouse: Mary Todd Hubbard
- Children: Elizabeth Clifford Hinde; Susannah Brooks Hinde; John W. Hinde; Hannah Hubbard Hinde; Mary Todd Hinde; Ann (Nancy) Winston Hinde; Thomas S. Hinde; Martha (Patsey) Harrison Hinde
- Relatives: Charles T. Hinde (grandson); Edmund C. Hinde (grandson); Frederick Hinde Zimmerman (great-grandson); Harry Hinde (great-grandson); Richard Southgate (son-in-law); William Wright Southgate (grandson)

Thomas Hinde (July 10, 1737 – September 28, 1828) was Northern Kentucky's first medical doctor, a member of the British Royal Navy, an American Revolutionary, personal physician to Patrick Henry, and treated General Wolfe when he died in the 1759 Battle of Quebec in Quebec, Canada.

== Overview ==
Thomas Hinde is the patriarch of the Hinde family in the United States. His youngest son, Thomas S. Hinde, was a notable Methodist minister and businessman, Charles T. Hinde, his grandson, was a shipping magnate, and Edmund C. Hinde, another grandson, was an adventurer. The Kavanaugh and Southgate branches of his family held elected office and positions of leadership in the Methodist church.

As personal physician to Patrick Henry, Hinde played a critical role in the American Revolutionary War through his vaccinations against smallpox and treatment of wounded soldiers. For his service he received a large land grant in Kentucky, where he moved with his family. Hinde was northern Kentucky's first physician, and a memorial was erected in Campbell County, Kentucky to honor his services to the state. He died in 1828 aged 91, which was unusually old for the time. According to Otto Juettner in 1909, who was a famous medical doctor and medical historian, Hinde "never wrote a line in his life." His life has been described as being like a "romance", and he was called a "patriarch" to the American medical profession.

== Early life ==
Hinde was born in Oxfordshire, England, in July 1737. He received a classical education in Oxfordshire and, after completing his studies, was sent to London, England to study medicine. He studied physics and surgery under Dr Thomas Brooke at Saint Thomas Hospital in London and, at the age of nineteen, was presented to the Company of Surgeons for a licence. Shortly after, he was commissioned as a Surgeons' Mate in the Royal Navy and sailed for America with the forces commanded by General Amherst. After landing in New York on June 10, 1757, he spent time at Halifax and Louisbourg. Hinde spent the winter of 1758 in Halifax and assisted Amherst with the reduction of Louisburg. He was attached to the ship which bore the commander in chief, General James Wolfe, on his way to Quebec.

== Death of General Wolfe ==
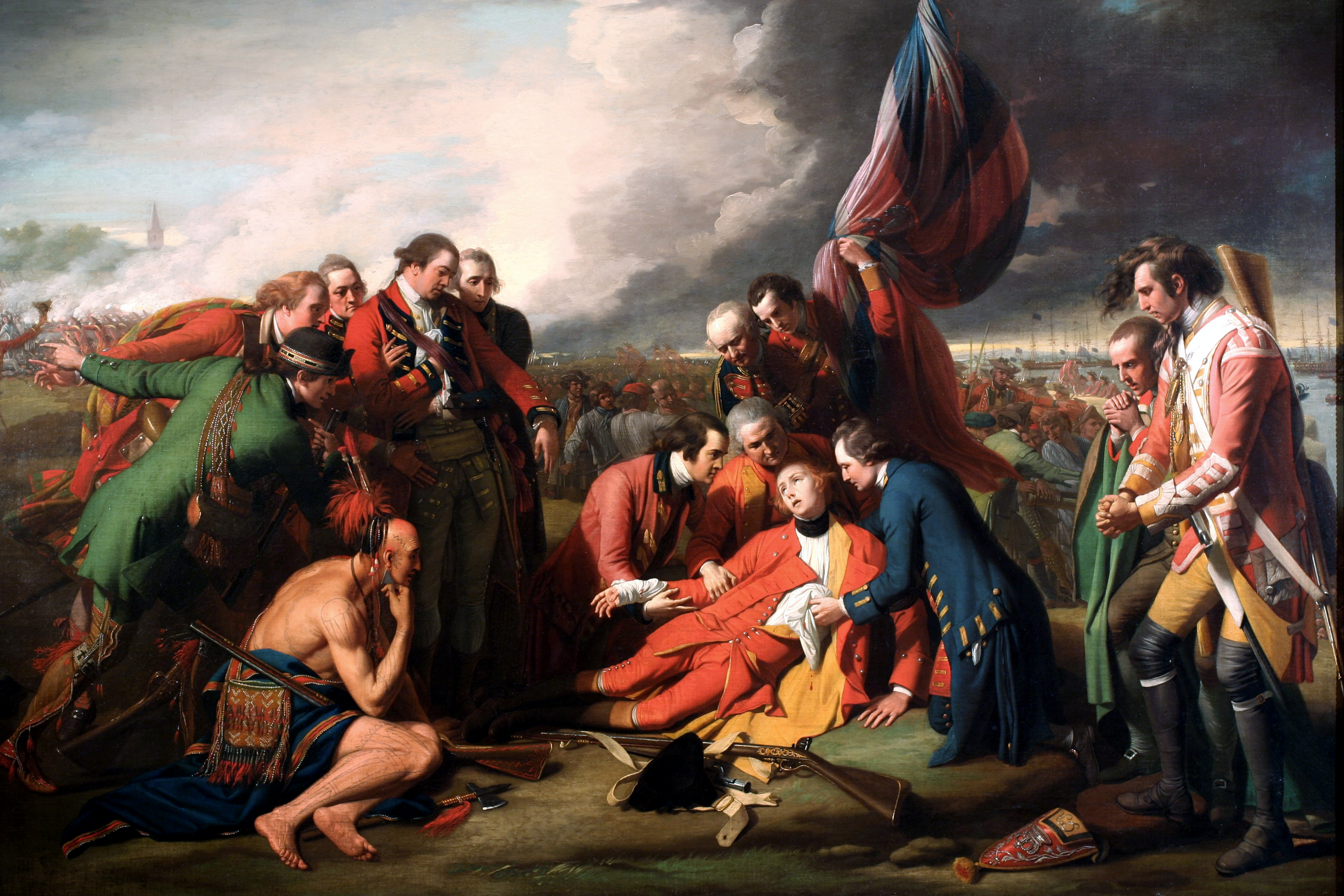
The Death of General Wolfe by Benjamin West

Wolfe died in Hinde's arms during the 1759 Battle of Quebec of the Seven Years' War. According to one source, Hinde's relationship with General Wolfe and his experiences in Quebec were some of the most "cherished" experiences of his life. A painting of the death shows Dr Hinde compressing a wound to General Wolfe's torso. It is an oil on canvas of the Enlightenment period. Benjamin West, who painted it, made a nearly identical painting of the same scene for King George III in 1771. After Wolfe's death, Hinde remained in the British Navy and was present for the reduction of Bell'isle. Shortly after, Hinde was promoted and remained as a physician for a warship after the peace of 1763. He eventually resigned his commission.

Copies of The Death of General Wolfe by West are currently in the collection of the National Gallery of Canada, the Royal Ontario Museum (Canadiana art collection), the William L. Clements Library at the University of Michigan and at Ickworth House, Suffolk, England.

== After Quebec ==
After the fall of Quebec, Hinde returned briefly to England. Peace with France was reached in 1763, and Hinde then returned to Virginia and settled. He formed a close friendship with an unnamed Virginian who persuaded him to settle in a place called Hobbs Hole in Essex County, Virginia and practice medicine. Another source states that an aged physician in Virginia wrote to Dr Thomas Brooke, Hinde's mentor, asking Brooke to send a young physician to assist him in his practice. Brooke reportedly choose Hinde and "earnestly advised" him to "avail himself of the situation which was offered". Hinde accepted, but moved soon after to settle in Newton, now in West Virginia, where he met his wife. After their wedding Hinde moved again and settled in Hanover County, Virginia.

== Physician to Patrick Henry ==
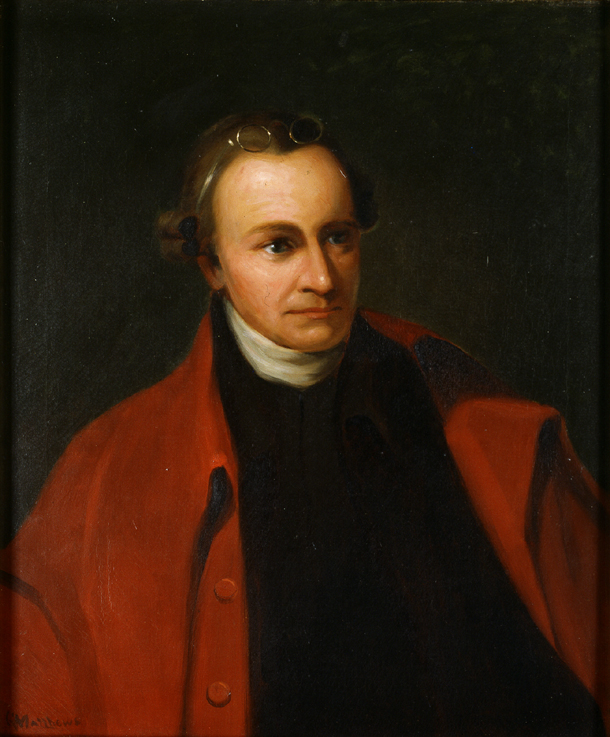
Patrick Henry

In 1765, after he settled in Virginia, Hinde became acquainted with Patrick Henry, one of the founding fathers of the United States, Samuel Davis, and Lord Dunmore. Two years later he married Mary T. Hubbard, settled near Henry, and became his family physician. His association with Henry and settlement in Virginia helped Hinde become acquainted with many of the leading members of society during the period. When Hinde first met Hubbard, he found her to "possess a great flow of animal spirits, full of humor, gay and lively inner temperament and disposition, with strong powers of mind, and at the same time active and sociable". The couple married on September 24, 1767. According to a biography written by George Coles in 1857, Henry's statesmanlike eloquence and political principles made a strong impression on Hinde and shifted him from being a staunch royalist to a "sturdy republican".

Hinde took an active part in the American Revolutionary War, serving as a surgeon with Patrick and in various campaigns and battles. At the time of the 1775 Gunpowder Incident, Hinde was Chief Surgeon for Patrick Henry. His involvement in it was the turning point that led him to embrace the cause of the oppressed colonies against Lord Dunmore and the English royalty. The Gunpowder Incident was a conflict early in the American Revolutionary War between Lord Dunmore, the Royal Governor of the Colony of Virginia, and militia led by Henry. Hinde originally planned to take a front-line post in Henry's regiment, but when Henry was elected Governor, Hinde was instead appointed to inoculate all members of the continental service. Because of insufficient funds in the Continental Army, Hinde was forced to cover the costs of inoculations, which "seriously impaired his private fortune". One source states that Hinde amputated limbs during the war by the "cart-load". After the war, Hinde continued to live in Hanover County for many years, primarily practicing medicine.

== Military land grant ==
After the American Revolutionary War, Hinde moved his family from Virginia to Kentucky, having received a large land grant for his services in the war. One source describes the land grant as follows:

At the close of the war, having drawn no part of his salary, and from his great skill as a surgeon having endeared himself to the Virginians, in settling up his accounts he was presented with a land warrant, to be located in lands selected in Kentucky, leaving a blank within the warrant for the number of acres to filled by Dr Hinde himself. The blank was filled with twenty thousand, and placed in the hands of Patrick Henry to select and locate the lands.

For undisclosed reasons, Henry was unable to complete the land grant to Hinde due to surveying difficulties, who then used his nephew Hubbard Taylor to go to Kentucky, find the location, and complete the transaction. Hinde gave Taylor half of the lands for this service. The land was in Clark County, Kentucky, between Winchester and Lexington.

== Conversion to Methodism ==
During his early years in England, Hinde was a member of the Church of England, but he abandoned the church as an adult and had become a Deist. One biographer stated that for a time Hinde "took pride and pleasure in ridiculing Christianity". In later years, however, his religious views "underwent a radical change".

In 1798, Methodist ministers arrived in Hinde's neighborhood and began to convert people. Susanna, one of Hinde's daughters, converted, causing distress to the family. Hinde banished her from his home, and she went to live with her aunt forty miles away. However, this failed because the aunt had already converted, and Hinde's wife converted soon after. Hinde became convinced that the disorder was in their heads, and treated them with medical procedures of the day, such as a "blistering plaster to the whole length of the spine, which he left on for several days". Drake states that, through this "measure of violence, he hoped to deter her from further attendance at places of public worship". The procedures were painful, but his wife stated afterwards that "it was a punishment, but I never was so happy in all my life". Hinde later felt guilt for having banished his daughter and performed medical operations on his wife, and he converted to Methodism. His daughter returned home and his wife began attending Methodist gatherings regularly. Two of his daughters married traveling preachers, and another daughter converted to Methodism too. By the end of his life, Hinde was a devout Methodist. According to one account:

At another time he was taking a morning walk and met Gen. James Taylor, a relative by marriage, who said, 'Good-morning, doctor; where are you going?' 'I am going to heaven; where are you going, general?' The general, at that time, had some doubts about whether his road led to the same country, and made no reply; but it is hoped he found the way to everlasting life before he left the world.'

One of Hinde's grandchildren states that Hinde built "little houses of sticks and wood" where he would pray. The grandchildren called them "Grandpa's prayer-houses". Hinde could be heard praying from a "considerable distance".

== Family ==
Hinde married Mary Todd Hubbard, the daughter of Benjamin Hubbard, an English merchant, and they were married for 61 years. They had eight children that lived to adulthood. His daughter Ann Winston Hinde married Richard Southgate on July 30, 1799, in Newport, Kentucky. Hinde and his family were members of the Grace Methodist Episcopal Church in Newport, Kentucky.

One of Hinde's sons was Thomas S. Hinde, who was a cofounder of Mount Carmel, Illinois, and became a well-respected Methodist minister. Hinde's grandson Captain Charles T. Hinde was a successful businessman and riverboat captain. Charles was one of the principal investors in the Hotel del Coronado in San Diego, California, and inspired Frederick Hinde Zimmerman, Dr Hinde's great-grandson, to build the Grand Rapids Hotel in Mount Carmel, Illinois.

In his later life, Hinde lived with his daughter Mary McKinney of Newport, Kentucky.
