= Kate (given name) =

- Gender: Female

Origin
- Origin: Greek, Latin, French, English, Welsh, Irish
- Meaning: pure

Other names
- Related names: Katherine; Katharine; Catherine; Kathryn; Kathleen; Katarina; Katrina; Kait; Caitlin; Caitríona; Caterina; Katerina; Cate; Catie; Cathie; Caty; Katie; Katy; Katey; Katia; Catia; Katia

Kate is a feminine given name. It is often a short form of Katherine, Caitlin, and other names.

== Translations and variations ==
- Arabic: كيت
- Belarusian: Каця (Katsia), Кацярына (Katsiaryna)
- Bengali: কেট (Kēṭa)
- Bulgarian: Кейт (Keĭt), Катя (Katya)
- Chinese Simplified: 凯特 (Kǎitè)
- Chinese Traditional: 凱特 (Kǎitè)
- Croatian: Katarina, Kata, Katica, Tina, Ina
- Czech: Katka, Kateřina, Kačka, Káťa, Kačenka, Káča, Kačí, Kačena
- Danish: Katja, Trine, Caja, Ina, Kaja, Karen, Karin, Karina
- Dutch: Kato, Cato, Ina, Katinka, Katja, Kaat, Rina, Tina, Trijntje, Karin, Tineke
- English: Kat, Kathi, Kathie, Kathy, Kay, Kit, Kitty, Kae, Kaye, Katey, Katie, Katy, Kayla, Kaety, Katee, Kaylee, Kayleen, Kaylyn, Kaytie
- Estonian: Kaisa, Kati, Keit, Riina, Triinu
- Finnish: Kaija, Kaisa, Kata, Kati, Katri, Riina, Kaarina, Karin
- Georgian: Eka
- German: Cathrin, Catrin, Ina, Käthe, Kathrin, Katinka, Katja, Karen, Karin, Karina
- Greek: Καίτη (Kaíti̱)
- Gujarati: કેટ (Kēṭa)
- Hawaiian: Kalena
- Hebrew: קייט
- Hindi: केट (Kēṭa)
- Hungarian: Katalin, Kata, Kati, Katalinka, Kató, Kitti
- Irish: Cáit, Ríona
- Italian: Catia, Katia, Rina
- Japanese: ケイト (Keito)
- Kannada: ಕೇಟ್ (Kēṭ)
- Korean: 케이트 (Keiteu)
- Lithuanian: Katrė
- Macedonian: Кејт (Kejt)
- Marathi: केट (Kēṭa)
- Mongolian: Кейт (Kyeit)
- Nepali: केट (Kēṭa)
- Norwegian: Kari, Katja, Ina, Kaia, Kaja, Karen, Karin, Karina, Karine
- Persian: کیت
- Polish: Kasia, Karina
- Portuguese: Cátia, Kátia
- Punjabi: ਕੇਟ (Kēṭa)
- Russian: Кейт (Keyt), Катенька (Katenka), Катерина (Katerina), Екатерина (Yekaterina), Катя (Katia), Катя (Katya)
- Scottish Gaelic: Ceit
- Serbian: Кata, Katarina
- Slovak: Katka, Katarína
- Slovene: Katica, Katja
- Swedish: Cajsa, Kai, Kajsa, Katja, Carin, Carina, Ina, Kaj, Kaja, Karin, Karina
- Tamil: கேட் (Kēṭ)
- Telugu: కేట్ (Kēṭ)
- Thai: เคท (Kheth)
- Ukrainian: Катерина (Kateryna)
- Urdu: کیٹ
- Welsh: Cadi
- Yiddish: קייט (Qyyt)

== People ==
=== In literature ===
- Kate Atkinson (born 1951), English author
- Kate Atkinson Bell (1907‍–‍2003), American educator
- Kate Langley Bosher (1865‍–‍1932), American novelist from Virginia
- Kate Cann (born 1954), English journalist and author
- Kate Chopin (1850‍–‍1904), American author
- Kate DiCamillo (born 1964), American children's author
- Kate Elliott (born 1958), pen name of American fantasy and science fiction writer Alis A. Rasmussen
- Kate Field (1838‍–‍1896), American journalist and actress
- Kate Greenaway (1846‍–‍1901), English author
- Kate E. Griswold (1860‍–‍1923), American editor, publisher, proprietor
- Kate Simpson Hayes (1856‍–‍1945), Canadian writer, teacher, milliner, legislative librarian
- Kate McCulley (born 1984) American travel blogger
- Kate McMullan (born 1947), American author of children's books
- Kate Millett (1934‍–‍2017), American feminist writer and activist
- Kate Mosse (born 1961), English author and broadcaster
- Kate Hevner Mueller (1898–1984), American psychologist and educator
- Kate Næss (1938–1987), Norwegian poet and translator
- Kate O'Brien (1897‍–‍1974), Irish novelist
- Kate Rushin (born 1951), American, Black lesbian poet
- Kate Sanborn (1839‍–‍1917), American author, teacher, lecturer
- Kate Seelye, American journalist specializing in coverage of the Middle East
- Kate Brownlee Sherwood (1841‍–‍1914), American poet, journalist, translator
- Kate Stone (1841‍–‍1907), American diarist
- Kate L. Turabian (1893‍–‍1987), American non-fiction writer and educator
- Kate Brew Vaughn (1873‍–‍1933), American author
- Kate Vitasek (born 1968), American author and educator
- Kate Walker (born 1950), popular British romance writer
- Kate Douglas Wiggin (1856‍–‍1923), American educator, author of children's stories

=== In music ===
- Kate Alexa (born 1988), Australian singer
- Kate Bush (born 1958), English singer-songwriter
- Kate Calvin (1856‍–‍1936), American academic, first music professor at Montana State College
- Kate Ceberano (born 1966), Australian jazz singer
- Kate Coppola, one half of American country music duo Kate & Kacey
- Kate DeAraugo (born 1985), Australian singer-songwriter and talent show contestant
- Kate Guldbrandsen (born 1965), Norwegian singer
- Kate Hall (born 1983), Danish and English singer
- Kate Havnevik (born 1975), Norwegian singer-songwriter
- Kate Maberly (born 1982), English singer-songwriter and actress
- Kate Markowitz (born 1956), American singer-songwriter and backup singer
- Kate McGarrigle (1946‍–‍2010), Canadian folk music singer-songwriter
- Kate Miller-Heidke (born 1981), Australian singer-songwriter and actress
- Moonshine Kate (1909‍–‍1992), American country and folk guitarist and banjo player
- Kate Nash (born 1987), English singer-songwriter
- Kate Pierson (born 1948), American singer and musician
- Kate Ryan (born 1980), Belgian singer-songwriter
- Kate Rusby (born 1973), English folk singer-songwriter
- Kate Smith (1907‍–‍1986), American singer
- Kate Taylor (born 1949), American singer and songwriter
- Kate Tunstall (known as KT Tunstall) (born 1975), Scottish singer-songwriter
- Kate Voegele (born 1986), American singer-songwriter and actress
- Kate Wolf (1942‍–‍1986), American folk singer-songwriter

=== In sport and athletics ===
- Kate Achter, American basketball coach
- Katie Allen (field hockey) (born 1974), Australian Olympic field hockey player
- Kate Allen (triathlete) (born 1970), Australian triathlete
- Kate Allenby (born 1974), British Modern Pentathlete
- Kate Delson (born 2005), American para-snowboarder
- Kate Fagan (born 1981), American sports reporter
- Kate Flood (born 1992), Australian rules footballer
- Kate Foster, (born 1985) British Olympic snowboarder
- Kate Gaze (born 1990), Australian basketball player
- Kate Gillou (1887‍–‍1964), French Olympic tennis player
- Kate Gray (born 2006), American freestyle skier
- Kate Hall (born 1997), American track & field athlete known for long jump and sprint
- Kate Horne (born 1954), Canadian curler
- Kate Howarth (soccer) (born 1991), American soccer player
- Kate Howey (born 1973), English judoka
- Kate Hwang (born 1980), American para athlete
- Kate Jobson (born 1937), Swedish swimmer
- Kate Kelly (camogie), Wexford camogie (a hurling variant) player
- Kate Koval (born 2006) Ukrainian basketball player
- Kate Krēsliņa (born 1996), Latvian basketball player
- Kate Ludik (born 1993), Mauritian badminton player
- Kate Markgraf (born 1976), American soccer player
- Kate Martin (born 2000), American basketball player
- Kate McIlroy (born 1981), New Zealand triathlete and distance runner
- Kate McMeeken-Ruscoe (born 1979), New Zealand basketball player
- Kate Pace (born 1969), Canadian alpine skier
- Kate Reed (born 1982), British long-distance runner
- Kate Reilly (born 2001), Canadian ice hockey player
- Kate Richardson (gymnast) (born 1984), Canadian artistic gymnast
- Kate Richardson-Walsh (born 1980), Olympic Medal winning English field hockey player
- Kate Sanderson (born 2000), Canadian Olympic swimmer
- Kate Shoemaker (born 1987), American Paralympic equestrian
- Kate Starre (born 1971), Australian field hockey player
- Kate Wilson-Smith (born 1979), Australian badminton player

=== In film, television and stage ===
- Kate Adie (born 1945), English television news correspondent
- Kate Arnell (born 1983), British children's TV presenter
- Kate Atkinson (actress) (born 1972), Australian actress
- Kate Beckinsale (born 1973), English actress
- Kate Beirness (born 1984), Canadian television sportscaster
- Kate Bell (Australian actress) (born 1983), Australian actress in film and television
- Kate Bell (British actress) (born 1981), British actress, known for her role in the television series Grange Hill
- Kate Berlant (born 1987), American comedian and actress
- Kate Bolduan (born 1983), American journalist and news anchor
- Kate Bosworth (born 1983), American actress
- Kate Box (born 1979), Australian actress
- Kate Bristol (born 1990), American voice actress
- Kate Burton (actress) (born 1957), British-American actress
- Kate Capshaw (born 1953), American actress
- Kate del Castillo (born 1972), Mexican actress
- Kate Cayley, Canadian writer and theatre director
- Kate Copstick, Scottish actress and director
- Kate Fleming (1965–2006), American actress
- Kate Garraway (born 1967), English television and radio presenter
- Kate Gerbeau (born 1968), English television presenter and newsreader
- Kate Gosselin (born 1975), American television personality
- Kate Hackett, American actress
- Kate Hall, American television soap opera writer
- Kate Harrington (1902‍–‍1978), American actress
- Kate Hennig (born 1961 or 1962), Canadian actress and playwright
- Kate Henshaw (born 1961), Nigerian actress
- Kate Hewlett (born 1976), Canadian actress
- Kate Horn (1826–1896), Canadian stage actress and director
- Kate Hudson (born 1979), American actress
- Kate Humble (born 1968), British television presenter
- Kate Isitt, English actress
- Kate Jackson (born 1948), American actress
- Catherine Kamau (born 1987), Kenyan award-winning actress popularly known as "Kate Actress"
- Kate Lawler (born 1980), English television presenter and Big Brother winner
- Kate Lonergan (born 1962), English actress
- Kate Lushington, Canadian theatre artist and teacher
- Kate Mara (born 1983), American actress
- Kate McCartney (born 1979 or 1980), Australian comedian, actress, and producer, one of the Kates, with Kate McLennan
- Kate McKinnon (born 1984), American actress and comedian
- Kate McLennan (born c.1980), Australian comedian, actress, and producer
- Kate Micucci (born 1980), American actress, comedian and musician
- Kate Mulgrew (born 1955), American actress
- Kate O'Mara (1939‍–‍2014), English actress
- Kate Phillips (born 1989), English actress
- Kate Ritchie (born 1978), Australian actress and radio personality
- Kate Smith (presenter), Northern Irish journalist and television presenter
- Kate Steinberg, American internet and television personality
- Kate Sullivan (born 1976), American television show host and anchor
- Kate Thornton (born 1973), English journalist and television presenter
- Kate Todd (born 1987), Canadian actress
- Kate Tsui (born 1979), Hong Kong actress
- Kate Valdez (born 2000), Filipino actress
- Kate Vernon (born 1961), Canadian actress
- Kate Walsh (actress) (born 1967), American actress
- Kate Walsh (businesswoman) (born 1981), British television presenter
- Kate Winslet (born 1975), English actress

=== In politics ===
- Katie Allen (politician) (1966–2025), Australian politician
- Kate Allsop, British politician
- Kate Bell (trade unionist), British trade unionist and Assistant General Secretary of the Trades Union Congress
- Kate Brandt, first American Chief Sustainability Officer
- Kate Brown (born 1960), American politician and attorney
- Kate Dearden, British politician
- Kate Foster (diplomat), British diplomat and ambassador
- Kate Gallego (born 1981), American mayor of Phoenix Arizona
- Kate Hoey (born 1946), British politician
- Kate Kelly (politician), Idaho state senator
- Kate Kelly (feminist) (born 1980), Washington, D.C. lawyer, and founder of Ordain Women
- Kate Knuth (born 1981), American Politician in Minnesota
- Kate Lewis, Grenadian politician
- Kate Middleton (born 1982), wife of William, Prince of Wales; now Catherine, Princess of Wales
- Kate Nicholl (born 1988), Northern Irish politician MLA and previous Lord Mayor of Belfast
- Kate O'Beirne (1949‍–‍2017), American conservative journalist and political commentator
- Kate Obenshain (born 1968), American journalist and conservative political commentator
- Kate Osamor (born 1968), British Labour Party politician
- Käte Selbmann (1906–1962), German teacher and politician
- Käte Strobel (1907‍–‍1996), German politician of the Social Democratic Party (SPD)
- Kate Warner (born 1948), Australian politician
- Kate Elman Wilcott, Canadian politician

=== In fashion ===
- Kate Bartholomew (1868–1951), American hat designer
- Kate Grigorieva (born 1988), Russian supermodel
- Kate Moss (born 1974), English supermodel
- Kate Spade (1962‍–‍2018), American fashion designer and businesswoman
- Kate Upton (born 1992), American actress and model

=== In science ===
- Kate Allstadt, Geologist, seismologist of Pacific Northwest geologic hazards
- Kate Ervine, Canadian political scientist
- Kate Fenchel (1905‍–‍1983), German born Jewish mathematician
- Kate Duval Hughes (born 1837), American inventor and author
- Kate Hutton American seismologist based in California, nicknamed Earthquake Kate
- Kate Marvel, American climate scientist
- Kate Pickett (born 1965), British Professor of Epidemiology at the University of York
- Kate Sessions (1857‍–‍1940), American botanist, horticulturalist, and landscape architect associated with San Diego
- Kate Yeo (born 2001), youth climate activist from Singapore.

=== Other ===
- Kate Adoo Adeku, Ghanaian academic and women's rights activist
- Kate Allen (Amnesty International) (born 1955), director of Amnesty International UK
- Kate Walker Behan (1851–1918), American club leader and philanthropist
- Kate Bell (businesswoman), British businesswoman
- Big Nose Kate (1850‍–‍1940), Hungarian-born prostitute and longtime companion and common-law wife of Old West gunfighter Doc Holliday, born Mary Katherine Horony
- Kate Bisschop-Swift (1834‍–‍1928), Dutch painter
- Kate Booth (1858‍–‍1955), English Salvationist and evangelist, eldest daughter of William and Catherine Booth
- Kate Burton (aid worker) (born 1981), British aid worker who was kidnapped and released in the Gaza Strip in 2005
- Kate Bushell (1983–1997), English murder victim
- Kate Embry Dowdle Davis (1871–1954), American historian and clubwoman
- Kate Fay, New Zealand chef and food writer based in Auckland
- Kate M. Fox American lawyer, chief justice of the Wyoming Supreme Court
- Kate M. Gordon (1861‍–‍1932), American suffragist
- Kate Hall (1861‍–‍1918) British museum curator
- Kate Hepburn (1947–2024), British graphic designer and artist
- Kate Kelly (journalist) (born 1975), American journalist
- Kate Kelly (outlaw) (1863‍–‍1898), sister of outlaw Ned Kelly
- Kate Kelly (sculptor) (1882‍–‍1964), American-Hawaiian sculptor
- Kate Manicom (1893–1937), British suffragette and trade unionist
- Kate Morgan (c. 1864 – 1892), American housemaid
- Kate Nicholas (born 1991), Dog trainer and talent show contestant
- Kate Perugini (1839‍–‍1929), English painter
- Kate Serokolo, South African anti-apartheid activist
- Kate Sheppard (1848‍–‍1934), New Zealand suffragist
- Kate Steinitz (1889‍–‍1975), artist and scholar known as "the Mama of Dada"
- Kate Stoneman (1841‍–‍1925), American suffragist and lawyer
- Kate Tyrrell (1863‍–‍1921), Irish sea captain and owner of a shipping company
- Katie Walker (born 1969), British furniture designer
- Kate Warne (1833‍–‍1868), first female detective in the US

== Fictional characters ==
- Kate Austen, in the television series Lost
- Kate Beckett, the main female character from the television series Castle
- Hawkeye (Kate Bishop), a Marvel Comics character
- Kate Kane, the second Batwoman from DC Comics
- Kate Laswell, a character in the Call of Duty Modern Warfare video game series
- Kate Lockley, in the television show Angel
- Kate Martin (All My Children) matriarch in the TV soap opera All My Children
- Kate Mitchell (EastEnders), in the British soap opera EastEnders
- Kate Patrick, a character from Hollyoaks
- Kate Ramsay, a character in the Australian soap opera Neighbours
- Kate Roberts, a character in the American soap opera Days of Our Lives
- Manhunter (Kate Spencer), a DC Comics heroine
- Kate Walker, the central character from the video game series Syberia
