= Yeow =

- Language: Chinese (particularly Southern Min)

Other names
- Variant forms: Yeo, Yeoh

Yeow is a Chinese surname. It is the spelling, based on pronunciations in different varieties of Chinese, of the following surnames, listed by their spelling in Pinyin (which reflects the Mandarin Chinese pronunciation):

- Yáo (Chinese: 姚), spelled Yeow based on its Hokkien pronunciation (Pe̍h-ōe-jī: Iâu; IPA: /iaʊ²⁴/)
- Yáng (traditional Chinese: 楊; simplified Chinese: 杨)
- Yóu (Chinese: 尤 or 游)

According to statistics cited by Patrick Hanks, there were 75 people on the island of Great Britain and four on the island of Ireland with the surname Yeow as of 2011. In 1881 there were no bearers of the surname in Great Britain. The 2010 United States census found 118 people with the surname Yeow, making it the 141,140th-most-common name in the country. About nine-tenths of the bearers of the surname identified as Asian, and fewer than 5% as White.

Notable people with the surname include:

- Yeow Chai Thiam (姚再添; 1953–2016), Malaysian politician and medical doctor
- Eileen Yeow (姚瑩瑩; born 1972), Singaporean actress
- Poh Ling Yeow (杨宝玲; born 1973), Malaysian-born Australian artist
- Yeow Kai Chai, Singaporean journalist

== See also ==
- Tan Teow Yeow (1946–2008), Singaporean judge (surname Tan, given name Teow Yeow)
- Chow Kon Yeow (born 1958), Malaysian politician (surname Chow, given name Kon Yeow)
