= Yeo =

- Language: Chinese (usually Hokkien), English, Korean

Other names
- Variant forms: Chinese: Yang, Yeung; Yao, Yiu; English: Yoe, Youe; Korean: Ryŏ, Lyuh

Yeo is a Chinese, English, and Korean surname.

== Origins ==
As an English surname, Yeo is a toponymic surname meaning "river", either for people who lived near one of the Rivers Yeo, or any river in general. The word comes from Old English ea, via south-western Middle English ya, yo, or yeo. Variant spellings include Yoe and Youe.

As a Chinese surname, Yeo is a spelling of the pronunciation in different varieties of Chinese of a number of distinct surnames, listed below by their pronunciation in Mandarin Chinese:

- Yáng (traditional Chinese: 楊; simplified Chinese: 杨), spelled Yeo or Yeoh based on its Hokkien pronunciation (Pe̍h-ōe-jī: Iûⁿ).
- Yáo (Chinese: 姚), spelled Yeo or Yeoh based on its Hokkien pronunciation (Pe̍h-ōe-jī: Iâu)
- Ráo (traditional Chinese: 饒; simplified Chinese: 饶)

As a Korean surname, the Revised Romanization of Korean (RR) spelling Yeo (Korean: 여) could correspond to any of three modern surnames:

- Beopchik Yeo (법칙 여; 呂; lit. 'the Yeo [character] which means 'rule''). The largest lineage with this surname is the Hamyang Yeo clan.
- Na Yeo (나 여; 余; lit. '"the Yeo which means 'I'"'). The largest lineage with this surname is the Uiryeong Yeo clan.
- Neo Yeo (너 여; 汝; lit. '"the Yeo which means 'you'"').

Additionally, two historical Korean surnames are also spelled Yeo in Revised Romanization:

- Goul Yeo (고울 여; 麗; lit. '"the Yeo which means 'beauty'"')
- Nameul Yeo (남을 여; 餘; lit. '"the Yeo which means 'remaining'"'), which originated from the Buyeo kingdom

== Statistics ==
Yeo was the 13th-most common Chinese surname in Singapore as of 1997 (ranked by English spelling, rather than by Chinese characters). Roughly 36,600 people, or 1.5% of the Chinese Singaporean population, bore the surname Yeo.

The 2000 South Korean census found 23,358 households and 65,196 people with the surnames spelled Yeo in Revised Romanization, divided among 17,498 households and 56,692 people for Beopchik Yeo, 5,741 households and 18,146 people for Na Yeo, and 119 people and 358 households for Neo Yeo.

According to statistics cited by Patrick Hanks, there were 2,529 people on the island of Great Britain and 20 on the island of Ireland with the surname Yeo as of 2011. In 1881 there had been 1,565 people with the surname in Great Britain, mainly in Devon, while in mid-19th-century Ireland it was found primarily in Dublin and Kilkenny.

The 2010 United States census found 2,805 people with the surname Yeo, making it the 11,272nd-most-common name in the country. This represented an increase from 2,194 (12,858th-most-common) in the 2000 Census. In the 2010 Census, about 55% of the bearers of the surname identified as Asian, and four-tenths as White. It was the 871st-most-common surname among respondents to the 2000 Census who identified as Asian.

== People ==
=== Chinese surnames ===
Chinese surnames Yáng (traditional Chinese: 楊; simplified Chinese: 杨) or Yáo (Chinese: 姚):

- Alex Yeo (杨陞才; born 1979), Singaporean lawyer and politician
- Alvin Yeo (杨康海; 1962–2022), Singaporean lawyer and politician
- Ben Yeo (杨志龙; born 1978), Singaporean actor
- Yeo Bee Yin (杨美盈; born 1983), Malaysian politician
- Yeo Cheow Tong (姚照东; born 1947), Singaporean politician
- Danny Yeo (杨君伟; fl. 1990s–present), Singaporean television host
- Edmund Yeo (杨毅恒; born 1984), Malaysian filmmaker
- George Yeo (杨荣文; born 1954), Singaporean former politician and Air Force brigadier-general
- Gwendoline Yeo (杨时贤; born 1977), Singaporean-born American actress and niece of George Yeo
- Yeo Guat Kwang (杨木光; born 1961), Singaporean unionist and former politician
- Yeo Jia Min (楊佳敏; born 1999), Singaporean badminton player
- Jamie Yeo (杨薏琳; born 1977), Singaporean media personality
- Jerry Yeo (杨伟烈; born 1986), former Singaporean actor
- Joscelin Yeo (杨玮玲; born 1979), Singaporean swimmer
- Kate Yeo (born 2001), youth climate activist from Singapore
- Yeo Keng Lian (杨景连; died 1960), Chinese-born Singaporean founder of Yeo Hiap Seng
- K. K. Yeo (杨克勤; born 1952), Malaysian-born American bible scholar
- Kuei Pin Yeo (杨圭斌; fl. 1976–present), Indonesian classical pianist
- Yeo Ning Hong (杨林丰; fl. 1970–1994), Singaporean politician
- Philip Yeo (杨烈国, born 1946), Singaporean bureaucrat
- Richard Yeo (scientist) (楊瑞才; fl. 1953–2000), Chinese American scientist best known for his research on disposable diapers
- Vivien Yeo (楊秀惠; born 1984), Malaysian actress
- Yeo Yann Yann (杨雁雁; born 1977), Malaysian actress
- Michelle Yeoh (楊紫瓊; born 1962), Malaysian actress

=== Korean surnames ===
Korean surnames (Korean: 여; Hanja: 呂, 余, 汝, 麗, or 餘):

- Yeo Bong-hun (여봉훈; born 1994), South Korean football midfielder
- Yeo Bum-kyu (여범규; 余範奎; born 1962), South Korean football midfielder
- Yeo One (born Yeo Chang-gu; 여창구; 呂暢九; 1996), South Korean singer and actor
- Mu Jin-sung (born Yeo Eui-ju; 여의주; 余意柱; 1988), South Korean actor
- Yeo In-hyeok (여인혁; fl. 2013–present), South Korean a cappella singer
- Yeo Hoe-hyun (여회현; 呂會鉉; born 1994), South Korean actor
- Yeo Hong-chul (여홍철; 呂洪哲; born 1971), South Korean gymnast
- Yeo Hoon-min (여훈민; born 1991), South Korean singer, former member of U-KISS
- Yeo Hyo-jin (여효진; 余孝珍; born 1983), South Korean football defender
- Yeo Hyun-soo (여현수; born 1982), South Korean actor
- Yeo Jin-goo (여진구; 呂珍九; born 1997), South Korean actor
- Yeo Kab-soon (여갑순; born 1971), South Korean sport shooter
- Yeo Min-jeong (여민정; fl. 2000–present), South Korean voice actress
- Yeo Myung-yong (여명용; 呂明龍; born 1987), South Korean football goalkeeper
- Yeo Oh-hyun (여오현; born 1978), South Korean volleyball player
- Yeo Ok (여옥; 麗玉), Korean woman poet of the Gojoseon kingdom (which fell in 108 BC)
- Yeo Reum (여름; born 1989), South Korean football midfielder
- Yeo Sang-yeop (여상엽; born 1984), South Korean speed skater
- Yeo Seung-won (여승원; 呂承垣; born 1984), South Korean football forward
- Yeo Sung-hae (여성해; 呂成海; born 1987), South Korean football defender
- Yeo U-gil (여우길; 呂祐吉; 1567–1632), Joseon Dynasty scholar-official
- Yŏ Ŭi-son (여의손; 呂義孫; fl. 15th century), Joseon Dynasty civil minister
- Vittoria Yeo (여지원; born 1980), South Korean soprano
- Yeo Woon-hyung (여운형; 呂運亨; 1886–1947), Korean politician
- Yeo Woon-kay (여운계; 呂運計; 1940–2009), South Korean actress
- Yeo Woon-kon (여운곤; 呂運坤; born 1974), South Korean field hockey player

=== Other ===
People with other surnames spelled Yeo, or people for whom the Chinese characters of their names are not available:

- Alby Yeo (1929–2014), Australian rules footballer
- Alfred Yeo (British politician) (1863–1928), British politician and businessman
- Alfred Yeo (Australian politician) (1890–1976), member of the New South Wales Legislative Assembly
- Angela Yeo (born 1984), American professional bodybuilder
- Brian Yeo (born 1944), English former footballer
- Caitlin Yeo (fl. 2006–present), Australian film score composer
- Dylan Yeo (born 1986), Canadian ice hockey player
- Douglas Yeo (born 1955), American symphony trombonist and professor
- Edward Roe Yeo (1742–1782), British politician, Member of Parliament for Coventry
- Elliot Yeo (born 1993), Australian football player for the West Coast Eagles
- Frank Ash Yeo (1832–1888), British industrialist and Liberal politician
- Gerald Francis Yeo (1845–1909), Irish physiologist
- Harriet Yeo (fl. 2012–present), British trade unionist
- Isaah Yeo (born 1994), Australian Rugby League player
- Iva Yeo (born 1939), Canadian politician in Manitoba
- James Yeo (shipbuilder) (1789–1868), Cornish-born shipbuilder, merchant, farmer and political figure in Prince Edward Island
- James Yeo (politician) (1827–1903), merchant, ship builder, ship owner, and Canadian Member of Parliament for Prince Edward Island
- James Lucas Yeo (1782–1818), British naval commander who served in the War of 1812
- John Yeo (1837–1924), Canadian parliamentarian
- Jonathan Yeo (born 1970), British portraitist
- Joseph Yeo (born 1983), Filipino professional basketball player
- Justin Yeo, Australian rugby league player
- Leonard Yeo (English politician) (died 1586), Member of Parliament for Totnes
- Lindsay Yeo (fl. 1970s–present), New Zealand radio host
- Mike Yeo (born 1974), American ice hockey coach
- Norman Yeo (1886–1950), Australian rules footballer
- Peter Yeo (born 1947), Australian rules footballer
- Peter M. Yeo (born 1963), American diplomat
- Richard Yeo (c. 1720–1779), British medalist and Chief Engraver at the Royal Mint
- Rick Yeo (fl. 1962–2005), Canadian ice hockey coach
- Simon Yeo (born 1973), English former footballer
- Tim Yeo (born 1945), British politician and Member of Parliament
- Walter Yeo (1890–1960), English World War I sailor and early plastic surgery patient
- William Yeo (1896–1972), Australian ex-service leader, farmer, and soldier

== See also ==
- F. F. E. Yeo-Thomas (1902–1964), British Second World War Special Operations Executive agent
- Yeoh, surname
