= Yoe (surname) =

- Language: English

Origin
- Language: Middle English
- Meaning: River

Other names
- Variant form: Yeo

Yoe is an English surname. It is a variant spelling of Yeo, meaning "river". The word comes from Old English ea, via south-western Middle English ya, yo, or yeo. According to statistics cited by Patrick Hanks, there were 16 people on the island of Great Britain and none on the island of Ireland with the surname Yoe as of 2011. In 1881 there had been 55 people with the surname in Great Britain, primarily in Devon. In the United States, the 2010 census found 509 people with the surname Yoe, making it the 42,579th-most-common name in the country.

Notable people with the surname include:

- A. C. De Yoe, American U.S. Army service member and politician
- Craig Yoe (born 1951), American author

== See also ==
- Shwe Yoe (1890–1945), Burmese actor (Burmese names do not have surnames)
