= Kate Bell =

Kate Bell may refer to:

- Kate Bell (Australian actress) (born 1983), Australian actress in film and television
- Kate Bell (British actress) (born 1981), British actress, known for her role in the TV series Grange Hill
- Kate Atkinson Bell (1907–2003), American educator
- Kate Bell (businesswoman), British businesswoman
- Kate Bell (trade unionist), British trade unionist and Assistant General Secretary of the Trades Union Congress

== See also ==
- Katy Bell (disambiguation)
- Katherine Bell (disambiguation)
- Catherine Bell (disambiguation)
