= Katherine Bell =

Katherine Bell may refer to:

- Katherine Bell (General Hospital), a fictional character in the TV series General Hospital
- Katherine Bell (volleyball) (born 1993), American volleyball player
- Katherine Bell Tippetts (1865–1950), née Bell, American businesswoman, clubwoman, and conservationist
- Katherine Bell, author of a story in The Best American Short Stories 2006

== See also ==
- Katy Bell (disambiguation)
- Kate Bell (disambiguation)
- Catherine Bell (disambiguation)
