= Catherine Bell (disambiguation) =

Catherine Bell (born 1968) is a British-American actress.

Catherine Bell may also refer to:

- Catherine Bell (religious studies scholar) (1953–2008), American scholar of religious studies
- Catherine J. Bell (born 1954), Canadian trade unionist and politician
- Catherine Elizabeth Bell, civil servant in the 2012 New Year Honours

== See also ==
- Katherine Bell (disambiguation)
- Katy Bell (disambiguation)
- Kate Bell (disambiguation)
- Kristen Bell (born 1980), American actress
