= Katie Bell =

Katy Bell or Katie Bell may refer to:

- Katie Bell (diver) (born 1988), American diver
- Katie Bell, a character from the Harry Potter novel series, portrayed by Georgina Leonidas in the films
- "Katy Bell", song on More Than Ever (Blood, Sweat & Tears album)
- Katy Bell, character in UK TV series Steel River Blues
- Katie Bell, a soccer player for the Real Colorado Cougars

== See also ==
- Kate Bell (disambiguation)
- Catherine Bell (disambiguation)
- Katherine Bell (disambiguation)
