= Hotel del Coronado =

Hotel in California, United States

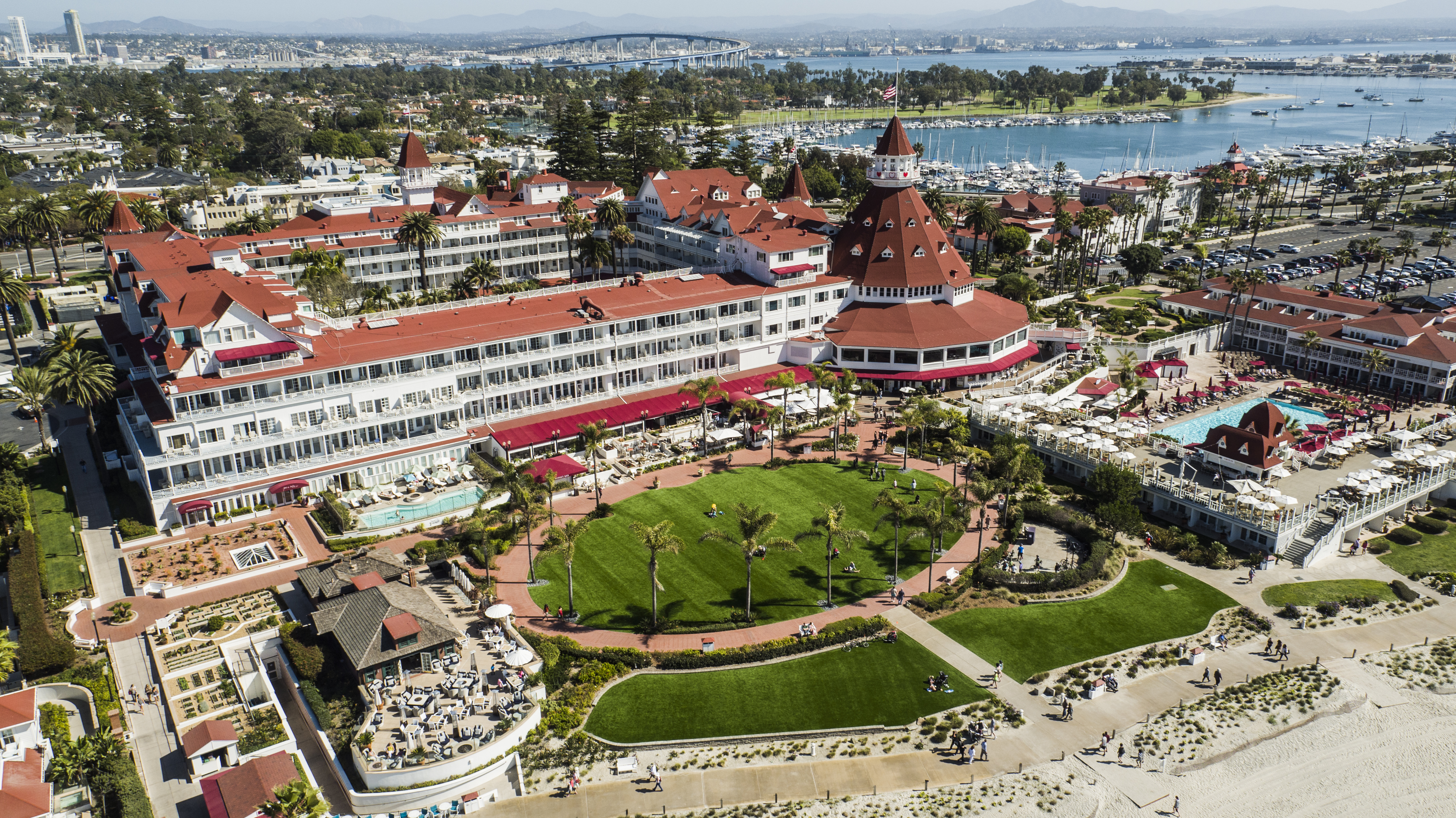
- Aerial view of the Hotel del Coronado, 2016

- Location within California Location within the United States

General information
- Location: United States, 1500 Orange Avenue; Coronado, California
- Coordinates: 32.6809°N 117.1784°W
- Opening: February 19, 1888; 138 years ago
- Owner: The Blackstone Group
- Operator: Curio Collection by Hilton

Height
- Height: 120 Ft (36.6 M) Architecturally 140 Ft (42.7 M) Tip of flagpole

Technical details
- Floor count: 7

Design and construction
- Architect: Reid & Reid

Other information
- Number of rooms: 757
- Number of suites: Junior Suites; Victorian Suites; Signature Suite; Resort Suites; Beach Village cottages Beach Village Cottages & Villas
- Number of restaurants: 7

Website
- hoteldel.com
- Hotel del Coronado
- U.S. National Register of Historic Places
- U.S. National Historic Landmark
- California Historical Landmark
- Architectural style: Late Victorian, Queen Anne
- NRHP reference No.: 71000181
- CHISL No.: 844

Significant dates
- Added to NRHP: October 14, 1971
- Designated NHL: May 5, 1977
- Designated CHISL: 1970

The Hotel del Coronado, also known as The Del and Hotel Del, is a historic beachfront hotel in Coronado, California, just across San Diego Bay from San Diego. A rare surviving example of an American architectural genre—the wooden Victorian beach resort—it was designated a California Historical Landmark in 1970 and a National Historic Landmark in 1977. The Hotel del Coronado was inducted into Historic Hotels of America, an official program of the National Trust for Historic Preservation, in 2018. It is the second-largest wooden structure in the United States (after the Tillamook Air Museum in Tillamook, Oregon).

When the hotel opened in 1888, it was the largest resort hotel in the world. It has hosted presidents, royalty, and celebrities, and been featured in numerous films and books.

== History ==
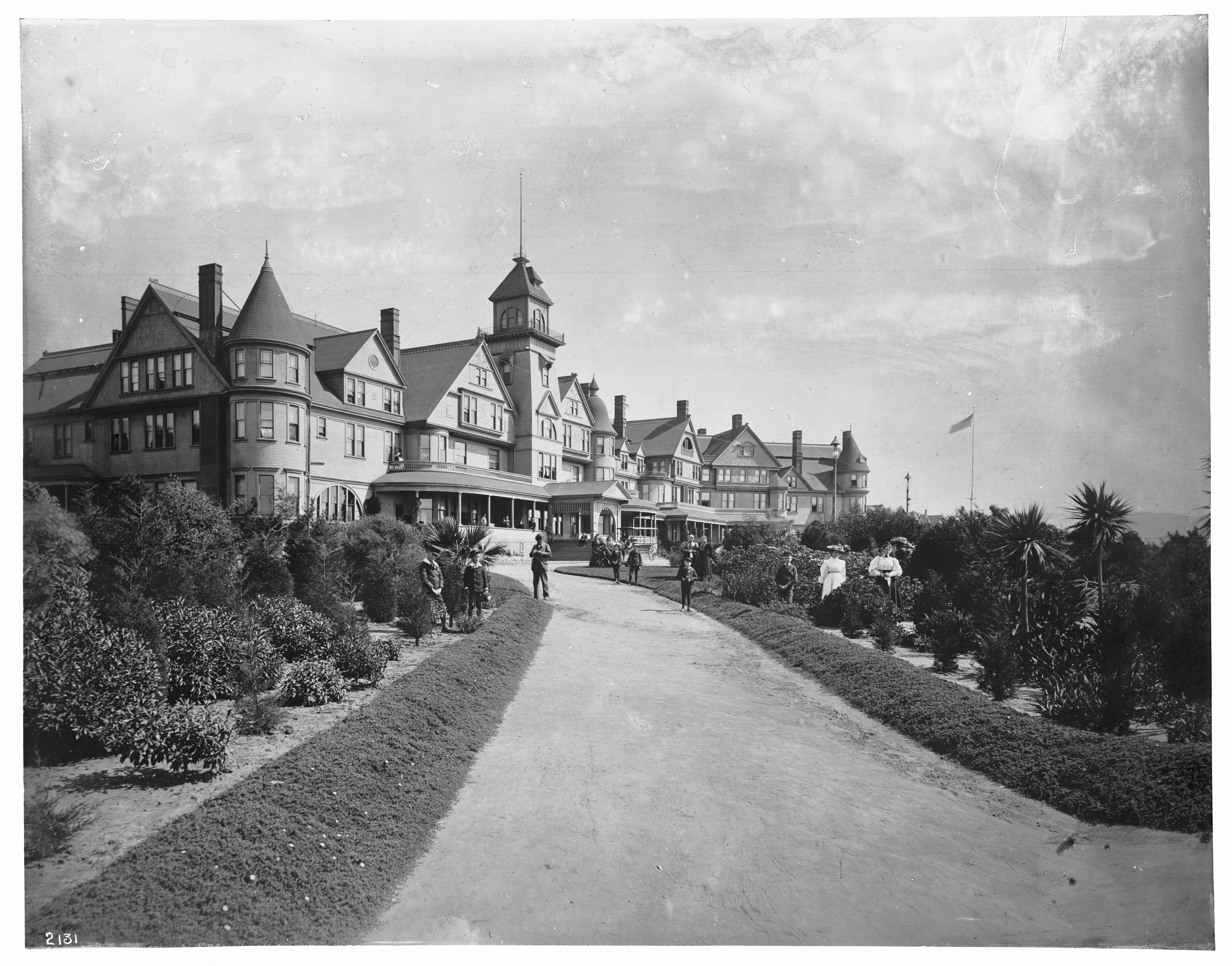
The Hotel Redondo, opened 1890

=== San Diego land boom ===
In the mid-1880s, the San Diego region was experiencing one of its first real estate booms. At that time, it was common for a California developer to build a grand hotel as a draw to an otherwise barren landscape; examples include The Hollywood Hotel in Hollywood, the Raymond Hotel in Pasadena, the Hotel Del Monte in Monterey, and Hotel Redondo in Redondo Beach.

=== Coronado Beach Company ===
In November 1885, a group of five investors bought Coronado and North Island, about 4,000 acres, for $110,000. They were E. S. Babcock, a retired railroad executive from Evansville, Indiana; Hampton L. Story, of the Story & Clark Piano Company of Chicago; Jacob Gruendike, president of the First National Bank of San Diego; Heber Ingle; and Joseph Collett.

In April 1886, Babcock and Story created the Coronado Beach Company, then additional enterprises to support Coronado's development. The Coronado Ferry Company built wharves and storage facilities and developed a ferryboat service between Coronado and San Diego; The Coronado Water Company piped fresh water under San Diego Bay from the San Diego River; The Coronado Railroad Company provided rail lines in Coronado, and eventually a "Belt Line" connected Coronado to San Diego via the Strand. The Hotel del Coronado had one of the state's largest electrical power plants, providing service to the entire community of Coronado until the 1920s.

The men hired architect James W. Reid, a native of New Brunswick, Canada, who first practiced in Evansville and Terre Haute. His brother Merritt Reid, a partner in Reid Brothers, the Evansville firm, stayed in Indiana, and his brother Watson Reid helped supervise the 2,000 laborers needed.

=== Babcock's vision ===
Babcock's visions for the hotel were grand:

It would be built around a court... a garden of tropical trees, shrubs and flowers... From the south end, the foyer should open to Glorietta Bay with verandas for rest and a promenade. On the ocean corner, there should be a pavilion tower, and northward along the ocean, a colonnade, terraced in grass to the beach. The dining wing should project at an angle from the southeast corner of the court and be almost detached, to give full value to the view of the ocean, bay, and city.

=== Construction ===
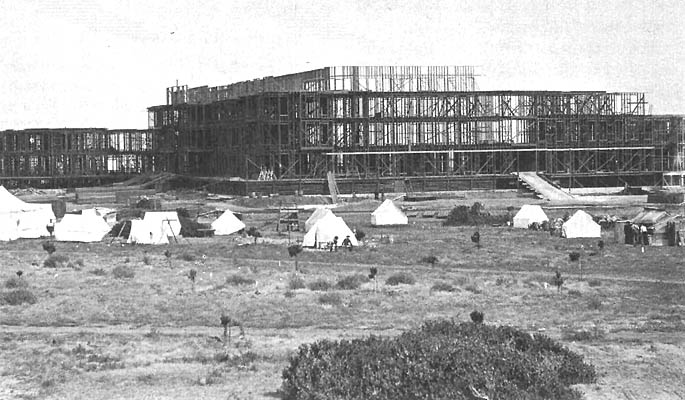
The Hotel del Coronado under construction in 1887

If the hotel were to be built, one of the numerous problems to overcome was the absence of lumber and labor in the San Diego area. The lumber problem was solved with contracts for exclusive rights to all raw lumber production of the Dolbeer & Carson Lumber Company of Eureka, California, one of the West's largest. Planing mills were built on site to finish raw lumber shipped directly from the Dolbeer & Carson lumber yards on the shores of Humboldt Bay. To obtain brick and concrete, Reid built his own kilns. He also constructed a metal shop and ironworks.

Construction of the hotel began in March 1887, "on a sandspit populated by jack rabbits and coyotes". The hotel opened for business on February 19, 1888. Labor was provided largely by Chinese immigrants from San Francisco and Oakland.

The Crown Room was Reid's masterpiece. Its wooden ceiling was installed with pegs and glue, and not a single nail was used.

Landscaping for the hotel was completed by Kate Sessions.

==== Planning for fire hazards ====
Reid's plans were constantly being revised. To deal with fire hazards, a freshwater pipeline was run under San Diego Bay. Water tanks and gravity flow sprinklers were installed. He also built two giant cisterns with concrete walls a foot thick in the basement to store rainwater. These were never used for rainwater, but were reputedly handy for storing alcohol during Prohibition. Reid also installed the world's first oil furnace in the hotel, prompting a Los Angeles oil company to build tankers to carry the oil to Coronado. Electric lighting in a hotel was also a world first. The electric wires were installed inside the gas lines, so if the electricity didn't work, gas could illuminate the rooms. Contrary to popular rumor, Thomas Edison was not involved in the installation of The Del's electrical system. The electricity was installed by the Mather Electric Company of Chicago (sometimes called the Mather-Perkins Company). An early Del brochure touted its "Mather incandescent electric lamps, of which there are 2,500." Electricity was still new to San Diego, having been introduced in 1886.

In 1904, the Hotel del Coronado introduced the world's first electrically lighted, outdoor living Christmas tree. From the San Diego Union, December 25, 1904: "The tree selected for the honor is one of the three splendid Norfolk Island pines on the plaza [grassy area in front of the hotel]. It has attained a height of fifty feet and its branches stand proudly forth. All day yesterday electricians were busy fitting it up and by night 250 lights of many colors gave beauty to the fine old pine. Lanterns, great and small, hung from its boughs. And now that an open-air Christmas tree has been introduced, it is likely that another Christmas Eve will find many California gardens aglow with light scattered from living foliage."

=== Grand opening and real estate bust ===
When the 399-room hotel opened for business in February 1888, 1,440 San Diegans traveled across the bay. Reports of the new grand hotel were wired across the country, but just as the hotel was nearing completion, the Southern California land boom collapsed. Babcock and Story needed additional funds at a time when many people were deserting San Diego. Babcock turned to Captain Charles T. Hinde and sugar magnate John D. Spreckels, who lent them $100,000 to finish the hotel. The Coronado Beach Company was then capitalized with $3 million. The company directors at this time were Babcock, Spreckels, Hinde, H. W. Mallett, and Giles Kellogg. By 1890 Spreckels bought out both Babcock and Story. The Spreckels family retained ownership of the hotel until 1948.

The original grounds had many amenities, including an Olympic-sized saltwater pool, tennis courts, and a yacht club with architecture resembling the hotel's grand tower. A Japanese tea garden, an ostrich farm, billiards, bowling alleys, hunting expeditions, and deep sea fishing were some of the many features offered to its guests.

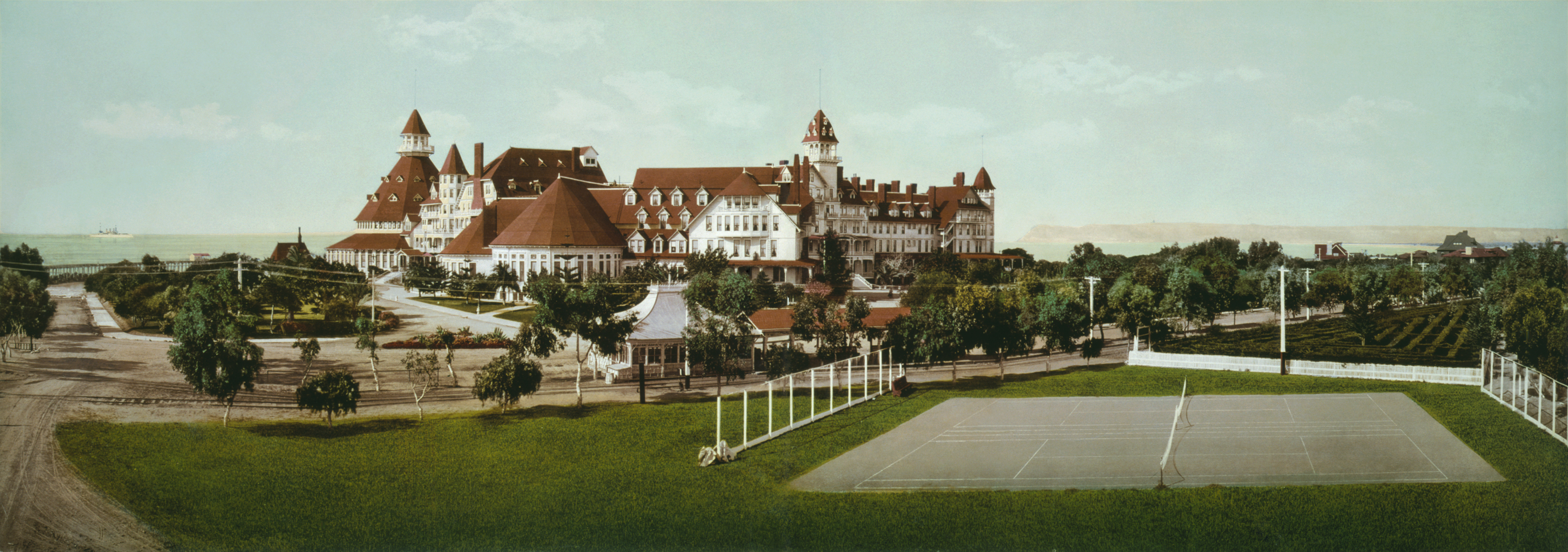
Restored photochrom print of the Hotel del Coronado by William Henry Jackson, c. 1900

=== Kate Morgan and Room 502 ===
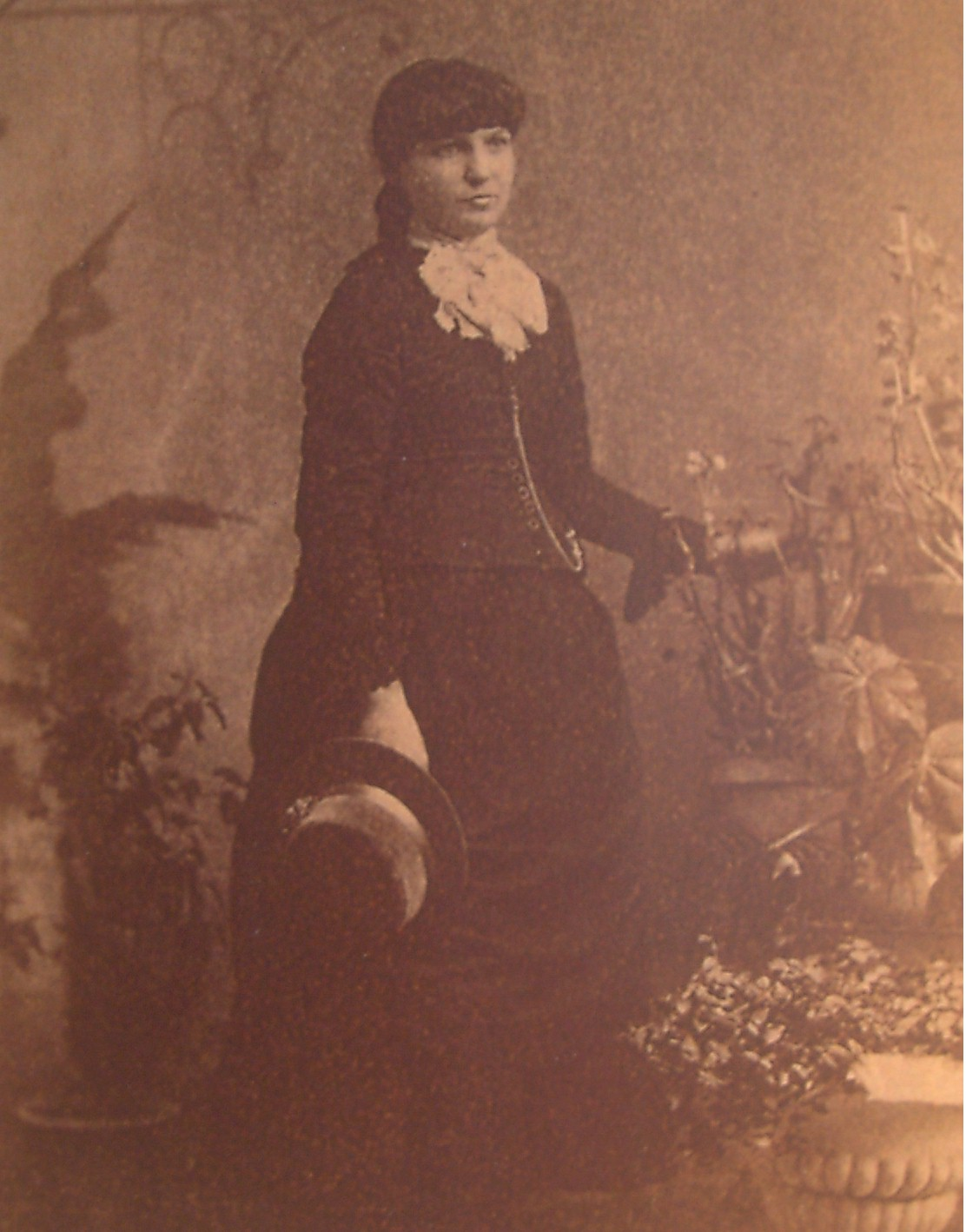
The alleged ghost of Kate Morgan is said to haunt the hotel

Kate Morgan (c. 1864 – 1892) was an American housemaid who died in her mid-twenties under mysterious circumstances at the Hotel del Coronado. She checked into the hotel alone under the name "Lottie A Bernard" from Detroit. Five days later, on November 29, 1892, she was found dead from a gunshot wound to her head. The San Diego County coroner determined the wound was self-inflicted, but skeptics claim the bullet that killed her did not match the gun in her hand.

To this day, Morgan is thought by locals to haunt the hotel, and the hotel website has a page about her. The hotel offers tours of Room 502, the room in which Morgan stayed. Room 502 is the most requested room at the Hotel del Coronado.

Due to this incident the Hotel del Coronado offers ghost tours called "Haunted Happenings" Fridays through Sundays at 7pm.

=== Prince Edward and Wallis Simpson ===
On April 7, 1920, Edward, Prince of Wales was honored with a grand banquet in the Crown Room. Despite speculation that he met his future wife and Coronado resident Wallis Simpson at the event—her then-husband Earl Winfield Spencer Jr. was the first commanding officer of nearby Naval Air Station San Diego—most historians believe they met later. Edward and Simpson wrote in their memoirs that they met much later.

=== Hollywood's playground ===
The hotel's popularity was established before the 1920s. It already had hosted Presidents Harrison, McKinley, Taft, and Wilson. By the 1920s, many of Hollywood's stars made their way to the hotel during the 1920s and 1930s, especially during Prohibition. Douglas Fairbanks, Charlie Chaplin, Rudolph Valentino, Clark Gable, Errol Flynn, Mae West, Joan Crawford, Katharine Hepburn, Bette Davis, and Ginger Rogers are among the actors who stayed at the hotel.

On New Year's Day 1937, during the Great Depression, the gambling ship SS Monte Carlo, known for "drinks, dice, and dolls", ran aground on the beach about a quarter mile south of the Hotel del Coronado.

=== World War II ===
During World War II, the U.S. government took over many West Coast resorts and hotels for housing and hospitals. The Hotel del Coronado housed pilots who were training at nearby North Island Naval Air Station on a contract basis, but it was never commandeered. General manager Steven Royce convinced the Navy not to take over the hotel because most of the additional rooms were being used to house the families of officers. He pointed out that "the fathers, mothers, and wives were given priority to the rooms because it may be the last time they will see their sons and husbands".

The hotel was designated as a "wartime casualty station". It began a victory garden program, planting vegetables on all spare grounds around the hotel.

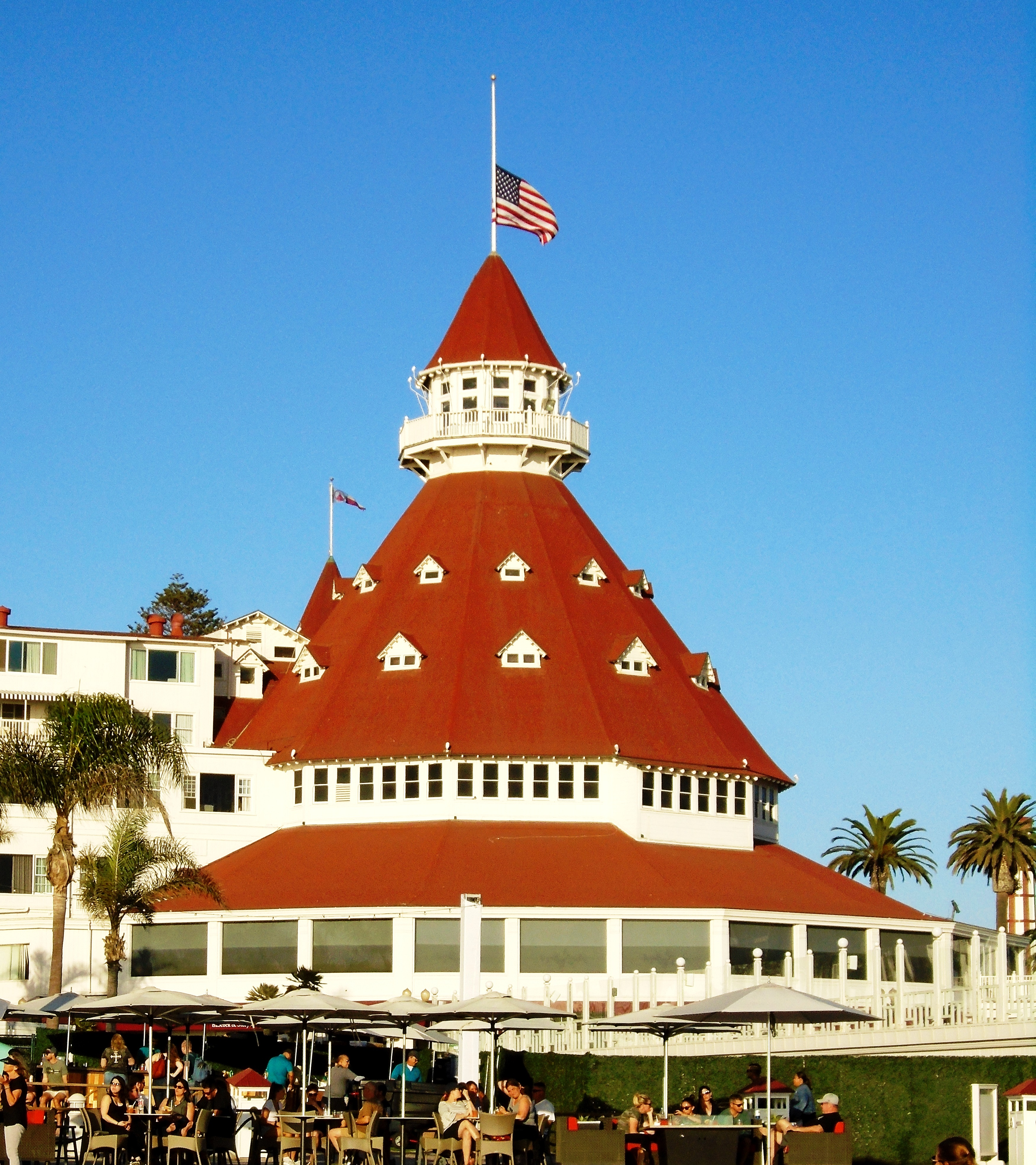
The rotunda of the Hotel del Coronado

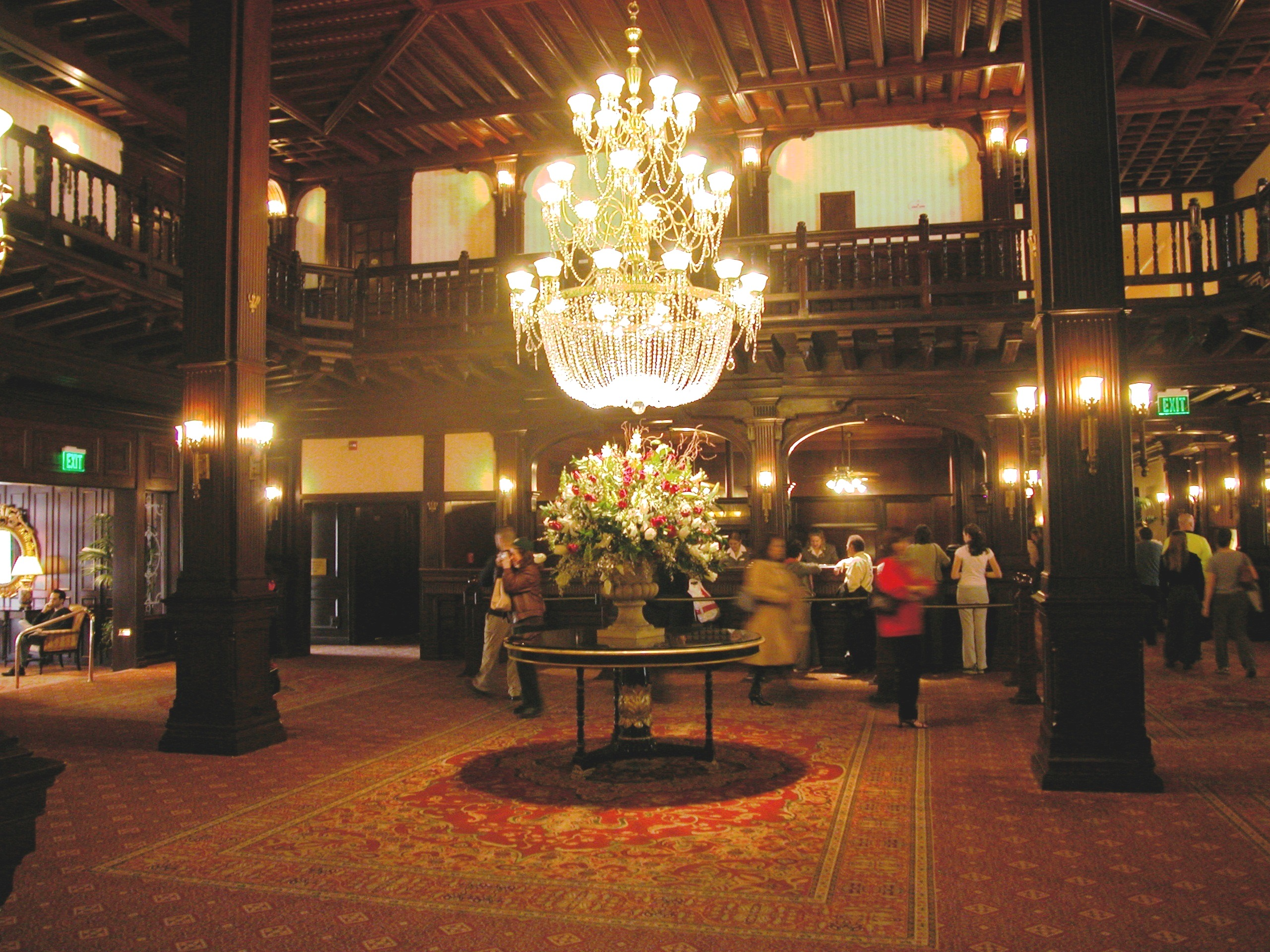
Lobby of the Hotel del Coronado, prior to its 2021 restoration

=== Post-war ===
Barney Goodman purchased the hotel from the Spreckels in 1948. From the end of World War II until 1960, the hotel began to age. While still outwardly beautiful, neglect was evident. In 1960, local millionaire John Alessio purchased the hotel and spent $2 million on refurbishment and redecorating. He commissioned Hollywood set designer Al Goodman to oversee the work, which included the Grand Ballroom, the Victorian Room Lounge, and the Victorian elevator grille.

Alessio sold the hotel to M. Larry Lawrence in 1963. Lawrence's initial plan was to develop the land around the hotel and ultimately demolish it, but he later changed his mind. Western International Hotels managed the hotel from September 18, 1963 to April 1, 1965. During Lawrence's tenure, he invested $150 million to refurbish and expand the hotel. He doubled its capacity to 700 rooms. He added the Grande Hall Convention Center and two seven-story Ocean Towers just south of the hotel.

By 1987, the hotel maintained a dedicated kosher kitchen for Jewish events. For one traditional wedding, its equipment, refrigerators, stoves and utensils were kashered under rabbinic supervision.

The Lawrence family sold the hotel to the Travelers Group after Lawrence died in 1996. The Travelers Group completed a $55 million upgrade of the hotel in 2001, which included seismic retrofitting.

=== 21st century ===
While retaining its classic Victorian look, the hotel continues to upgrade its facilities. In 2005, it obtained approval to construct up to 37 limited-term occupancy cottages and villas on the property and to add up to 205 rooms.

The hotel received a Four Diamond rating from the American Automobile Association in 2009 and was listed in 2011 by USA Today among the top 10 resorts in the world.

The hotel has been sold in several transactions between financial institutions. In 2003, Travelers sold the property to CNL Hospitality Properties Inc. and KSL Recreation Corp (CNL/KSL). This ownership group completed a $10 million upgrade of 381 rooms in June 2005. The hotel was then owned by the Blackstone Group LP (60%), Strategic Hotels & Resorts Inc. (34.5%), and KSL Resorts (5.5%). When Strategic Hotels & Resorts Inc. bought its stake in 2006, the hotel was valued at $745 million; as of 2011, the hotel was valued at roughly $590 million. In 2014, Strategic Hotels & Resorts became full owners of the hotel. In December 2015, Blackstone purchased Strategic Hotels & Resorts.

In March 2016, Blackstone sold Strategic Hotels & Resorts to Anbang Insurance Group, a Beijing-based Chinese insurance company, in a $6.5 billion deal involving multiple resorts. Anbang thus bought 16 luxury U.S. hotel properties including the Hotel del Coronado. Fifteen of them were immediately transferred to Anbang, but the sale of the Hotel del Coronado was held up because of concerns expressed by the federal inter-agency Committee on Foreign Investment in the United States, which reviews acquisitions of U.S. businesses by foreign investors for possible national security risks. The agency was concerned about the hotel's proximity to major Navy bases. In October 2016, it was reported that the deal had fallen through and the hotel would remain in Blackstone's ownership.

In August 2017, Hilton Hotels and Resorts took over the management of the Hotel del Coronado as part of its Curio Collection. The resort is still owned by Blackstone and the name Hotel del Coronado has not changed.

The hotel began a redevelopment and expansion in 2019 to add a new entryway, more guest rooms, parking garages, another restaurant, and more. The remodel was projected to last three years and cost $400 million.

On March 26, 2020, the hotel closed temporarily, due to the COVID-19 epidemic. This was the first time in the property's 132-year history that it had closed its doors to guests. It reopened on June 26.

In 2021, the hotel's historic main lobby, front facade, and front veranda were restored, for $14 million. In 2022, the hotel opened a new wing, Shore House at the Del, featuring 75 one-, two- and three-bedroom residential-style units. The historic main wing closed in January 2024 for one year for a more than $160 million renovation, the final portion of the resort's $550 million makeover. The upgrades encompass all Victorian guest rooms, suites, and event spaces, including the Crown Room. The remodeled guest rooms reopened throughout 2025. Renovations were completed in June 2025.

== Notable guests ==
Notable guests of the hotel include Thomas Edison, Marilyn Monroe, L. Frank Baum, Charlie Chaplin, King Kalakaua of Hawaii, Vincent Price, Babe Ruth, James Stewart, Bette Davis, and Katharine Hepburn. More recent guests include Kevin Costner, Whoopi Goldberg, Gene Hackman, George Harrison, Keanu Reeves, Brad Pitt, Madonna, Barbra Streisand, and Oprah Winfrey.

The following presidents have stayed at the hotel: Benjamin Harrison, William Howard Taft, Woodrow Wilson, Franklin D. Roosevelt, Lyndon B. Johnson, Richard Nixon, Gerald Ford, Jimmy Carter, Ronald Reagan, George H. W. Bush, Bill Clinton, and George W. Bush.

The hotel is also known for hosting weddings and is often cited as one of California's most expensive wedding locations. The wedding capacity is about 300 people, with several event spaces for guests. It has been used as a wedding venue by celebrities, and basketball player LeBron James considered the hotel as a wedding location in 2013.

== Marilyn Monroe exhibition ==
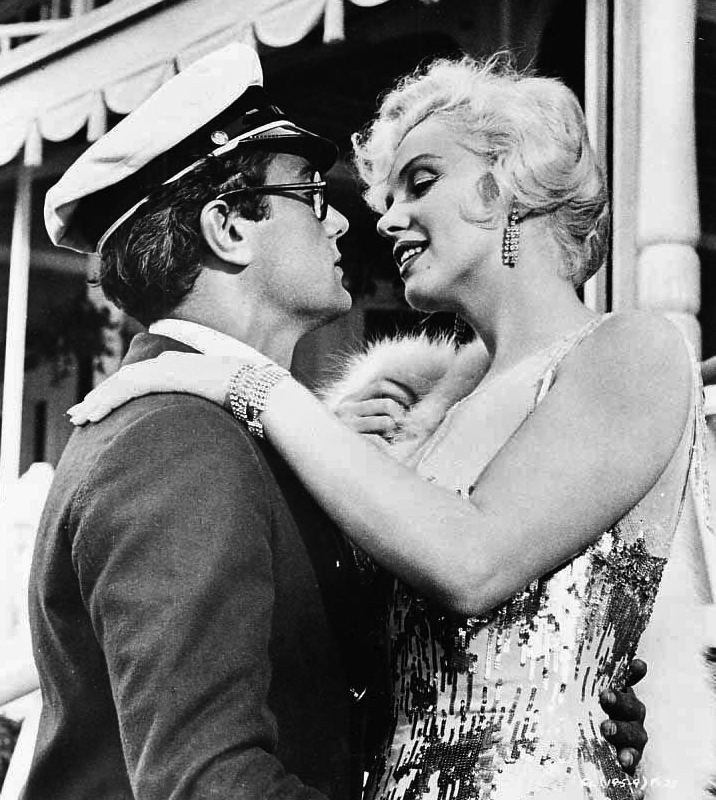
Image for the promotion of Some Like it Hot, filmed at Hotel Del Coronado

in 2026, the hotel hosted an exhibition celebrating some of Marilyn Monroe’s most significant roles as an actress. She had stayed at Hotel Del Coronado in 1958 for her iconic film, Some Like it Hot; she and her crew occupied around 100 rooms. The exhibition was a collaboration between Hotel Del and Lawrence Schiller, who had famously captured Marilyn Monroe behind the scenes in a more personal manner in her last years of life.

== In popular culture ==
=== Films ===
The hotel was first featured in a film when it was used as a backdrop for The Married Virgin (1918). Since then, it has been featured in at least 13 other films, including Some Like It Hot (1959), where it represented the "Seminole Ritz" in southern Florida; $ (1971); Wicked, Wicked (1973), which was completely filmed on location there; The Stunt Man (1980); The Girl, the Gold Watch & Everything (1980); and My Blue Heaven (1990).

The science historian James Burke filmed his special The Neuron Suite at the Coronado.

The Hotel del Coronado was the primary location for the filming of the fantasy-comedy feature film Daydream Hotel, which had its world premiere at the 1st Annual Coronado Island Film Festival in 2016.

=== Literature ===
- In Moran of the "Lady Letty": A Story of Adventure Off the California Coast (1898) by Frank Norris, a shanghaied San Francisco dandy wins in a showdown against a Chinese triad gang on the shore of the Baja California Peninsula, teaching them the lesson: "Don't try to fight with white people." Triumphant, the protagonist sails to San Diego and makes a dramatic appearance at a society soiree in the hotel's "incomparable round ballroom".
- L. Frank Baum did much of his writing at the hotel and is said to have based his design for the Emerald City on it, though other sources say the Emerald City was inspired by the "White City" of the Chicago World's Fair of 1893.
- Ambrose Bierce used the hotel as the setting for his short story "An Heiress From Redhorse".
- It was the setting for Richard Matheson's novel Bid Time Return (1975), but in the movie version, Somewhere in Time (1980), the story setting and filming were moved to the Grand Hotel on Mackinac Island, Michigan.
- In Michael Connelly's 2016 novel The Wrong Side of Goodbye, protagonist Harry Bosh finds the negative of a photograph taken in front of the hotel of a woman holding a baby, allowing him to identify the town and date.

=== Music ===
- The Hotel del Coronado is the setting of the Dashboard Confessional song "Stolen".

=== Stage productions ===
Each December since 1994, Lamb's Players Theatre and the hotel have presented An American Christmas, a three-hour "Feast & Celebration" set 100 years earlier, in the hotel's ballroom.

The stage musical adaptation of Some Like It Hot takes place at the hotel.

=== Television ===
The hotel stood in for the fictional Mansfield House during host segments of the NBC anthology series Ghost Story in 1972. The storylines of Baywatch season 4, episodes 14 and 15, called "Coronado del Soul" Parts 1 and 2, evolve in and around the hotel.

The grounds and some interior areas were used in three episodes of Antiques Roadshow in February and April 2019.

The hotel is shown at the beginning of the first stage in the anime adaptation of Hirohiko Araki's manga series Steel Ball Run.

=== Postage stamp ===
The hotel is featured on a US postage stamp honoring director Billy Wilder, with images of Marilyn Monroe and the hotel from Some Like It Hot.

=== Video games ===
The hotel appears in the background of the San Diego level in the Sega Genesis game Skitchin' (1994).

== Gallery ==
View from the surf showing the Beach Village to the left, the Victorian Building in the center, and the California Cabanas and Ocean Towers to the right
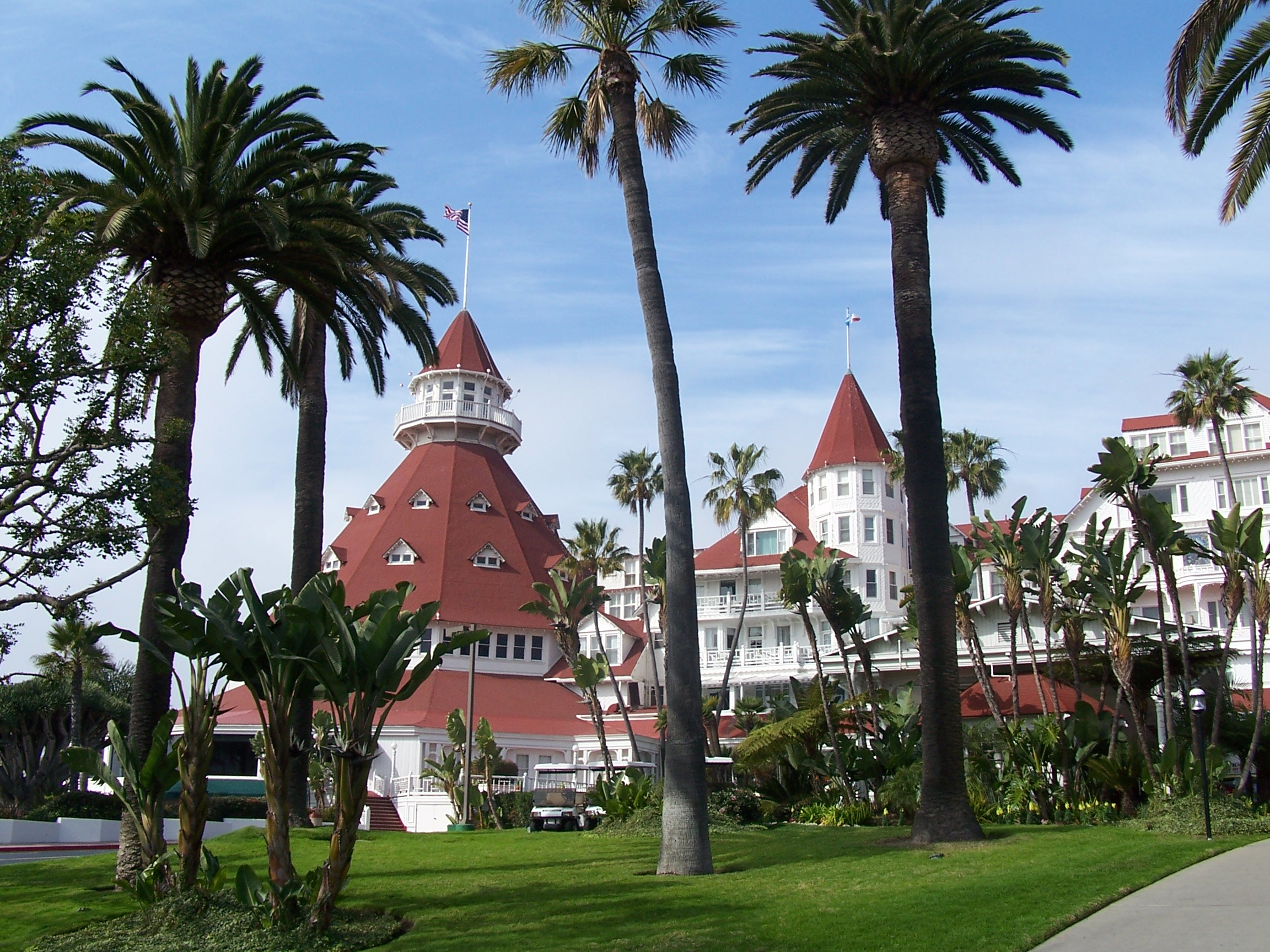
Front of the Hotel del Coronado

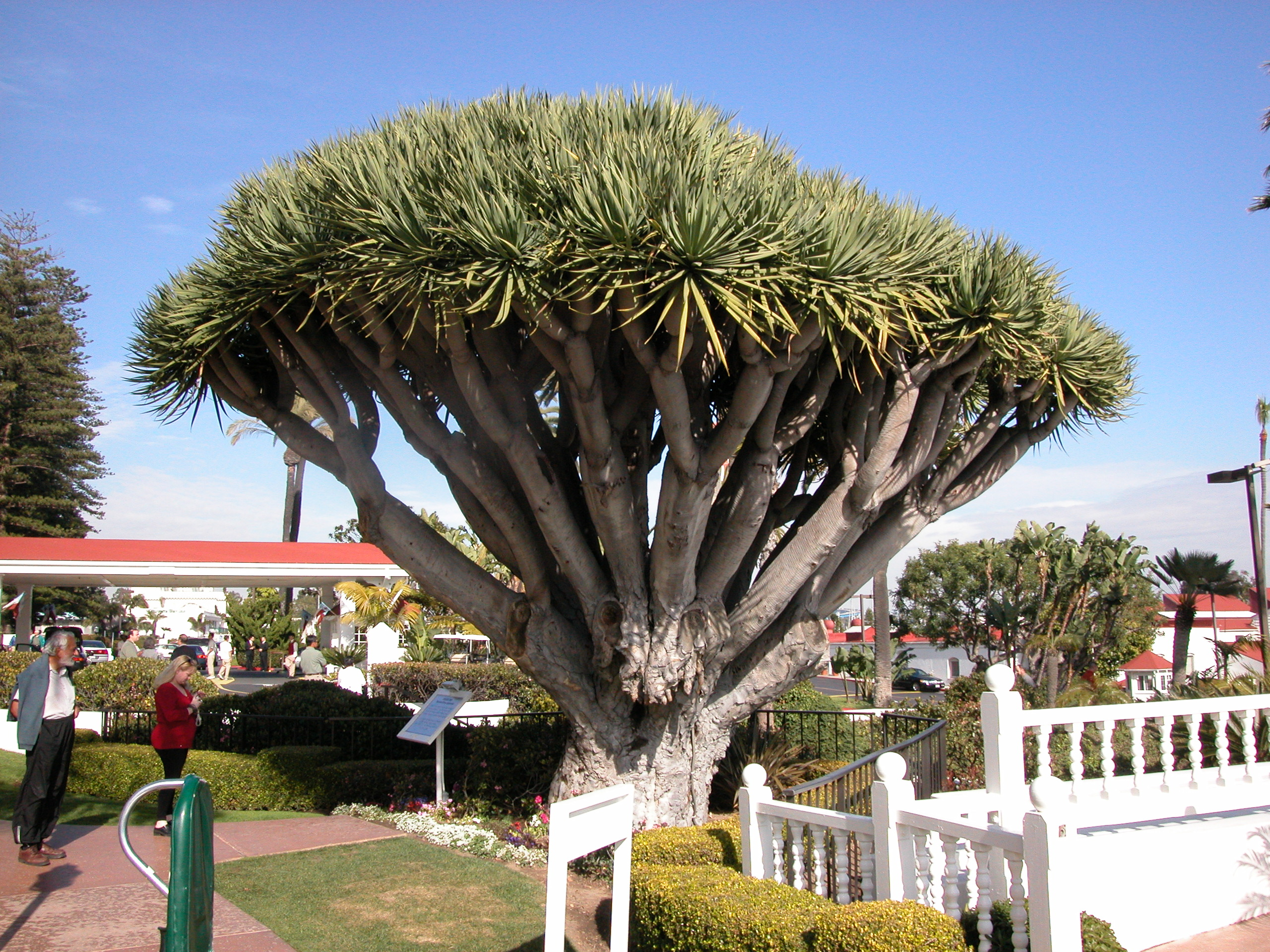
Dragon Tree located at the Hotel del Coronado

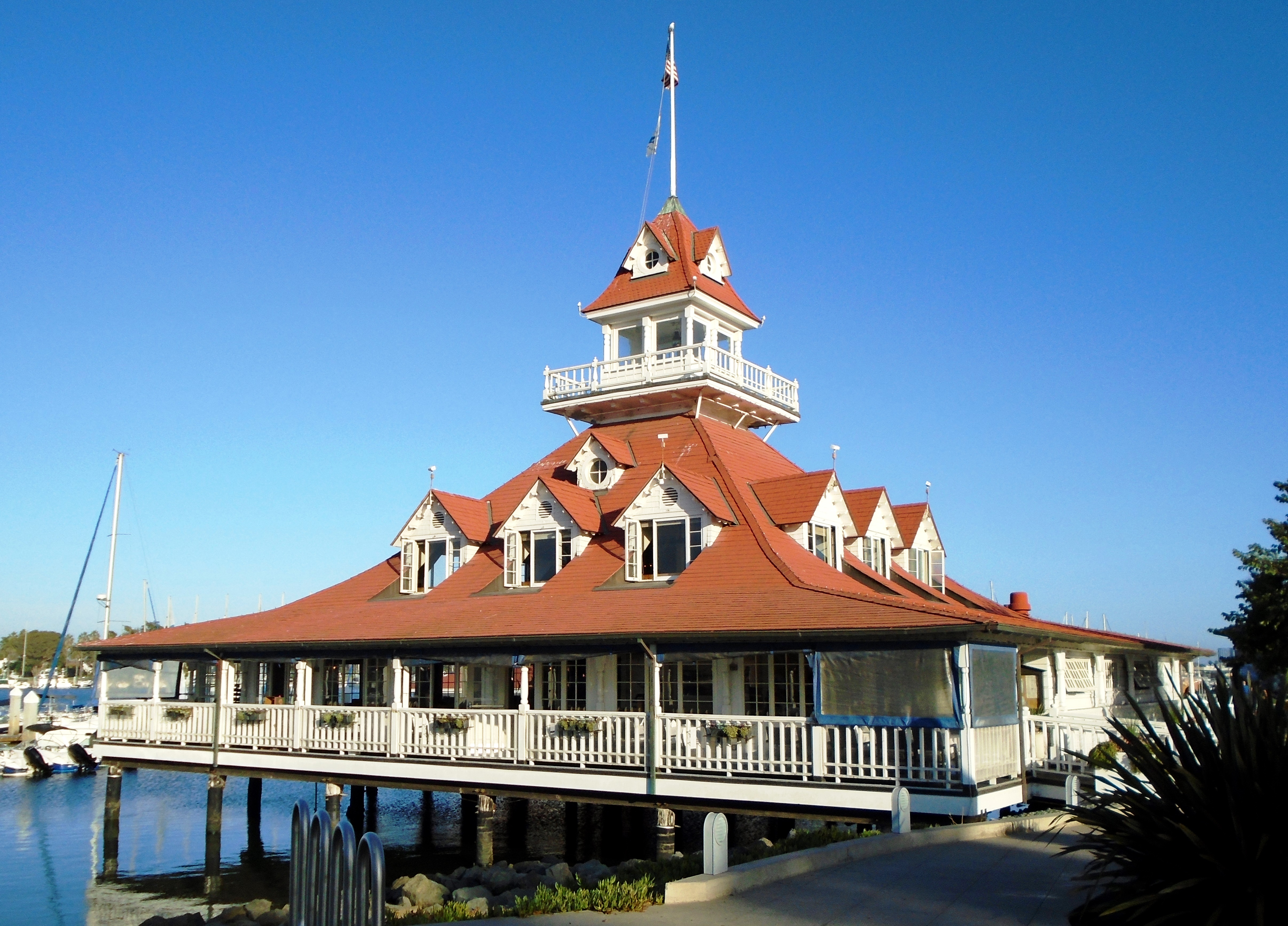
The hotel's former boathouse on Glorietta Bay is now a restaurant.

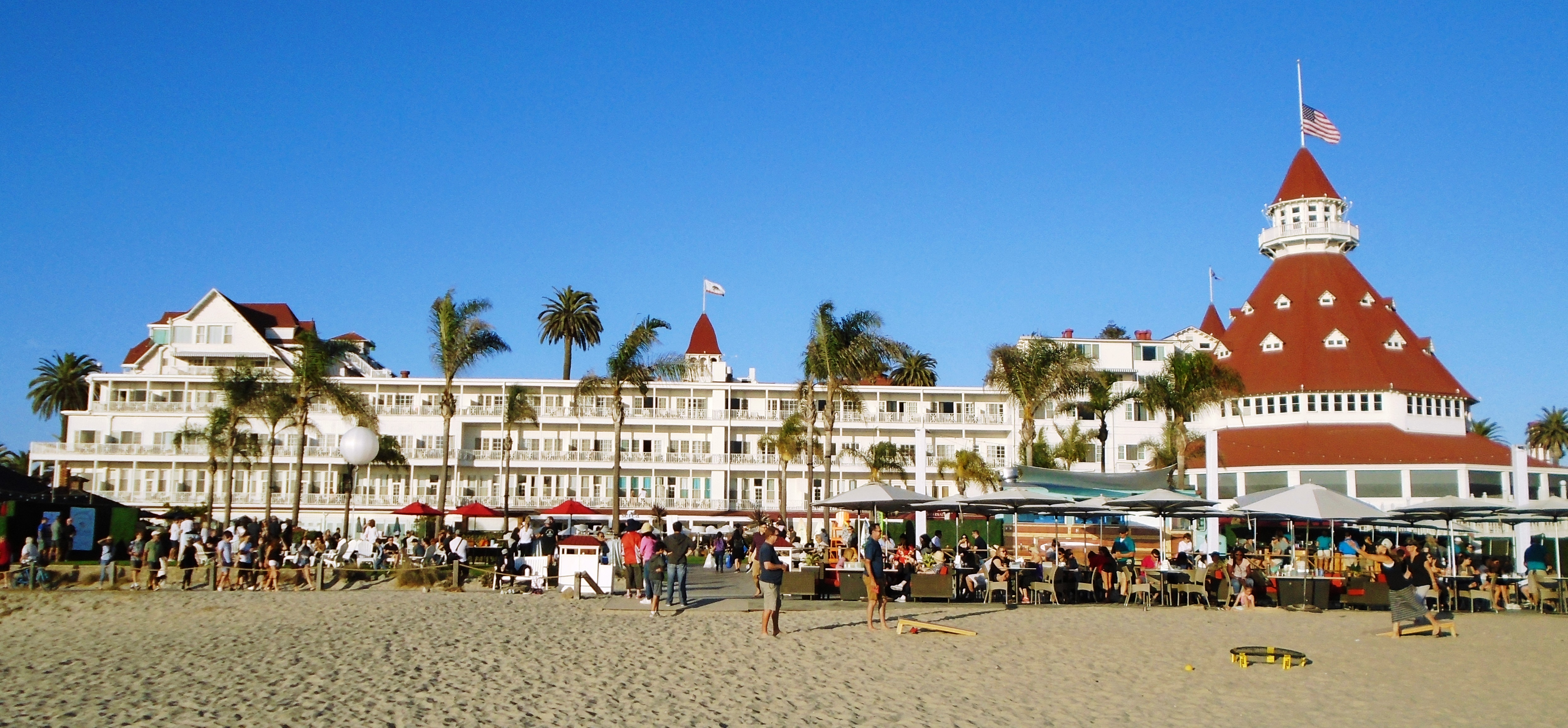
View from Coronado Beach of the main building

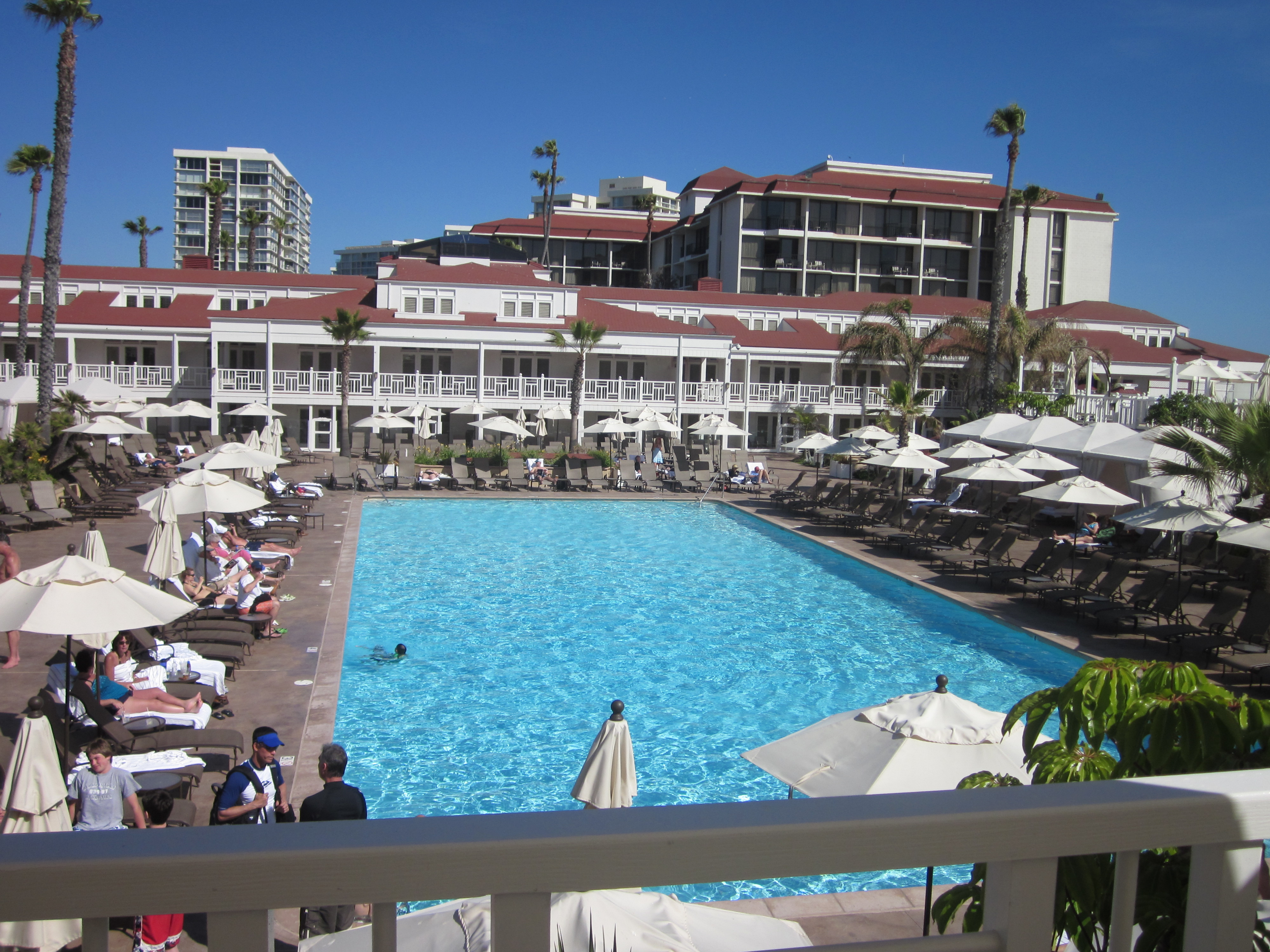
The Hotel del Coronado swimming pool

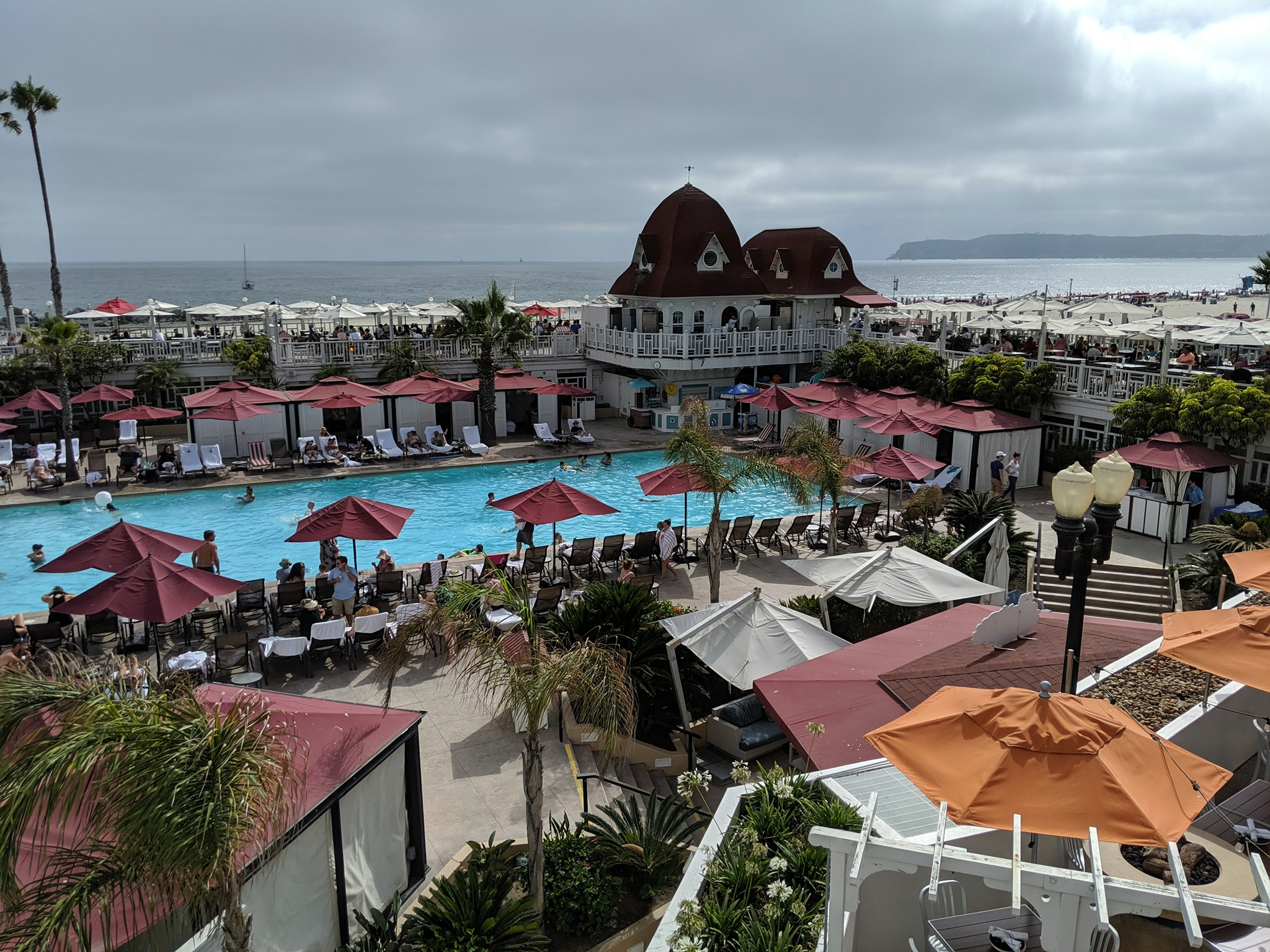
Pool view

== See also ==
- Thomas Gardiner, Coronado Beach Company advertising manager in the 1890s
- Charles T. Hinde, board member of the Hotel del Coronado, vice president of the Spreckels Brothers Commercial Company, railroad executive, and steamboat captain.
- Disney's Grand Floridian Resort & Spa, a 1988 hotel whose exterior architecture is based on the Hotel Del Coronado
- Grand Rapids Hotel, a 1922 hotel built by Frederick Hinde Zimmerman, the nephew of Captain Charles T. Hinde, one of the original investors of the Hotel del Coronado.
