= Katherine Bell Tippetts =

American conservationist (1865–1950)

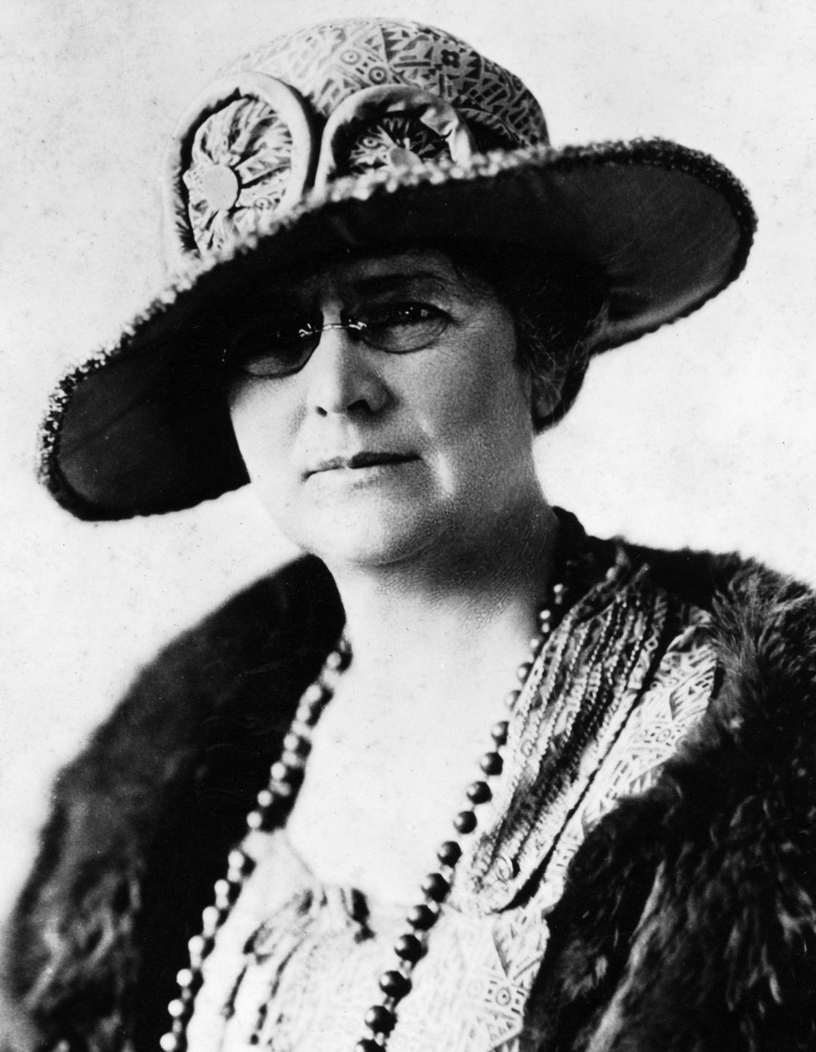
- Katherine Bell Tippetts, from a 1922 portrait in the collection of the State Library and Archives of Florida
- Born: Emily Katherine Bell; March 11, 1865; Marion Station, Maryland, U.S.
- Died: December 20, 1950 (aged 85); St. Petersburg, Florida, U.S.
- Other name: Jerome Cable (pseudonym)
- Occupations: Businesswoman; clubwoman; politician; writer; conservationist
- Known for: Conservation advocacy in St. Petersburg and across Florida
- Spouse: William Henry Tippetts (m. 1890; died 1909)
- Children: 4

Emily Katherine Bell Tippetts (March 11, 1865 – December 20, 1950) was an American businesswoman, clubwoman, and conservationist based in St. Petersburg, Florida. She was one of the first women to run for a seat in the Florida legislature, in 1922. As the founder and president of the St. Petersburg chapter of the National Audubon Society for over 30 years, and in various statewide and national leadership positions with women's clubs, Tippetts helped establish protective legislation and bird sanctuaries throughout Florida.

== Early life ==
Emily Katherine Bell was born in Marion Station, Maryland, the daughter of Nathaniel Thomas Bell and Julia Frances Hawkes Bell. Her mother was a Mayflower descendant through Isaac Allerton, a lieutenant-governer under William Bradford.

== Career ==
=== Audubon Society and conservation work ===
Tippetts moved to Florida in 1902, one of the city's "pioneers" and proprietor of the Belmont Hotel. She founded the St. Petersburg chapter of the National Audubon Society in 1909, holding the first meeting in her hotel, and was the chapter's president for over 30 years, until she retired from the post in 1940. She was also the first woman president of the Florida Audubon Society, serving from 1920 to 1924. By this time, she had gained a national reputation as a conservationist. She contributed to the establishment of wildlife sanctuaries in Florida, and the passage of the Migratory Bird Act of 1913. Dubbed the "Florida Bird Woman", she successfully petitioned the state to form the Florida Fish and Game Commission, as well as to protect the American robin and holly plants. In 1915, under her pressure, St. Petersburg became the second known city in the world to tax cat owners, an effort to control the hazards of stray and abandoned cats. "Mrs. Tippetts said that she would rather have a tree named for her, than anything else, except perhaps her child and grandchild," according to a 1928 account. She was chair of the Nature Study and Wildlife Refuges committee (1924 to 1928) and chair of the Division of Conservation (1928 to 1932) of the General Federation of Women's Clubs.

=== Other leadership roles ===
During World War I, Tippetts raised money as city chair of the War Savings Stamp campaign. In 1922, Tippetts became one of the first two women to run for a seat in the Florida legislature. She was defeated finishing second out of four. She was vice president of the American Forestry Association, and president of the Florida Federation of Women's Clubs from 1926 to 1928. She worked with her friend and Florida first lady May Mann Jennings on some federation projects, and in leadership of the Florida Legislative Council. She chaired the Florida Chamber of Commerce, was a member of the Florida State Reclamation Board, and served as a trustee of both the National Park Association and the National Camp Fire Girls. She was vice president of the Crippled Children's Guild, and in that role helped to found a children's hospital in 1926. She also organized the city's first Boy Scout troop and renamed the nearby Reservoir Lake to Mirror Lake in honor of her late husband's newspaper, the Lake George Mirror. Tippetts also served on local hospital and parks boards, and she was a member of the Florida Educational Survey Commission, State Board of Illiteracy, and the National Board of Finances of the YWCA.

=== Writing ===
Under the pen-name "Jerome Cable", Tippetts published a novel, Prince Arengzeba: A Romance of Lake George (1892). She later wrote a pamphlet, Birds of the States (1932) about state birds, for schools and women's study groups. In 1941, she was honored by the St. Petersburg branch of the National League of American Pen Women.

== Personal life ==
Bell married newspaperman William Henry Tippetts in 1890, and moved to Florida for his health in 1902; he died in 1909. They had three sons and a daughter. Katherine Bell Tippetts died in 1950, aged 85 years, in St. Petersburg. There is a park in St. Petersburg named in her memory.
