= Yeoh =

Yeoh is one spelling of the Hokkien pronunciation (Pe̍h-ōe-jī: Iûⁿ; IPA: /iũ²⁴/) of the Chinese surname spelled in Mandarin Chinese Pinyin as Yáng (traditional Chinese: 楊; simplified Chinese: 杨; see that article for the history of the surname). Another common spelling is Yeo. Both the spellings Yeoh and Yeo are common in southeast Asia, for example among Malaysian Chinese.

== People ==
Notable people with the surname Yeoh include:

- Benjamin Yeoh (born 1978), British playwright
- Bernard Yeoh (born 1969), Malaysian sport shooter
- Brenda Yeoh, Singaporean academic and geographer
- Cheryl Yeoh (born 1983), Malaysian entrepreneur in California
- Dawn Yeoh (born 1986), Singaporean actress
- Francis Yeoh (born 1954), Malaysian businessman, son of Yeoh Tiong Lay
- Hannah Yeoh (born 1979), Malaysian politician
- Joanne Yeoh (born 1977), Malaysian violinist
- Melvin Yeoh (born 1981), Malaysian mixed martial artist
- Michelle Yeoh, Malaysian businesswoman, granddaughter of Yeoh Tiong Lay
- Michelle Yeoh (born 1962), Academy Award winner Malaysian actress
- Nikki Yeoh (born 1973), British jazz pianist
- Rachel Yeoh, Malaysian businesswoman, granddaughter of Yeoh Tiong Lay
- Rebekah Yeoh, Malaysian businesswoman, granddaughter of Yeoh Tiong Lay
- Ruth Yeoh, Malaysian businesswoman, granddaughter of Yeoh Tiong Lay
- Yeoh Eng-kiong (born 1946), Malaysian born Hong Kong politician
- Yeoh Ghim Seng (1918–1993), Singaporean politician
- Yeoh Kay Bin (born 1980), Malaysian badminton player
- Yeoh Kay Ee, Malaysian badminton player
- Yeoh Kean Thai (born 1966), Malaysian artist
- Yeoh Ken Nee (born 1983), Malaysian diver
- Yeoh Li Tian (born 1999), Malaysian chess player
- Yeoh Tiong Lay (1929–2017), Malaysian businessman who founded YTL Corporation

== Fictional characters ==
- Alysia Yeoh, Batgirl character introduced in 2011

== See also ==
- Yeoh (hyperelastic model): a material model for rubbers named after O.H. Yeoh
- Yeo, surname
