= A. C. De Yoe =

California legislator and American military veteran

- Born: United States
- Military career
- Conflicts: Spanish–American War

Member of the California State Assembly
- Governor: C. C. Young

A. C. De Yoe was an American veteran of the Spanish–American War and member of the California State Assembly alongside Governor C. C. Young.
