= Uiryeong Yeo clan =

- Country: Korea
- Current region: Uiryeong County
- Founder: Yeo Seon jae
- Connected members: Yeo Hyo-jin; Yeo Min-ji
- Website: https://cafe.daum.net/ur-yeo

Uiryeong Yeo clan (Korean: 의령 여씨; Hanja: 宜寧 余氏) was one of the Korean clans which is descended from the last king of Baekje, Buyeo Pung. After Buyeo Pung was captured by army of Tang, the prince was forcibly sent to inland China. A descendant of the prince and the founder of Uiryeong Yeo clan was Yeo Seon jae, who was a Counsellor Remonstrant (Hanja: 諫議大夫) in Song dynasty. He moved to Goryeo and was appointed as Prince of Uichun (Hanja: 宜春君) in Goryeo. Their Bon-gwan was in Uiryeong County, South Gyeongsang Province. According to the research in 2000, the number of Uiryeong Yeo clan was 17780.

== See also ==
- Korean clan names of foreign origin
