= Kate Calvin =

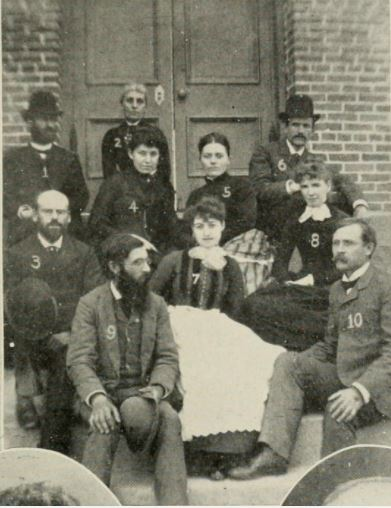
The College of Montana at Deer Lodge, The Faculty of 1887: 1) Frank N. Notestein 2) Mary B. Hill 3) F.D. Kelsey 4) Lizzie Woolfolk 5) Lena Vaughn 6) Theodore Brantly 7) Lois Reat 8) Kate Calvin 9) Frank W. Traphagen 10) Duncan J. McMillan

Kate P. Calvin (November 4, 1856 - April 9, 1936) was the only woman among Montana State College's first three professors and the first music professor. One quad of the dormitory at Montana State College, Quad B, is named after Kate Calvin.

== Early life ==
Kate P. Calvin was born on November 4, 1856. She studied piano in the United States and Germany.

== Career ==
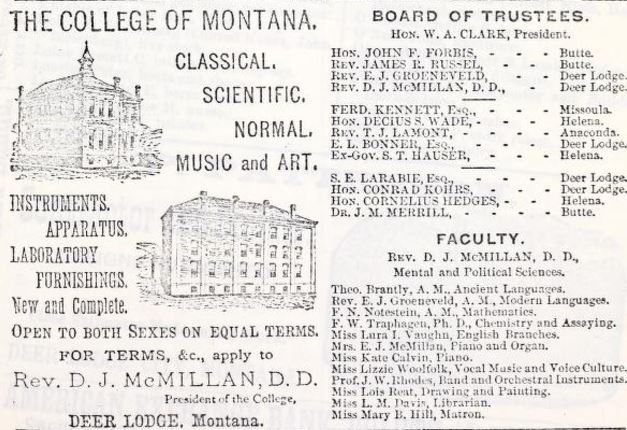
Minnesota, North and South Dakota and Montana gazetteer and business directory

Kate Calvin joined Montana State College in 1894 when the college was primarily a place where to study "agriculture and the mechanical arts".

She was among the first three professors of the college; the others were Augustus M. Ryon, mining engineer who served as the founding president of Montana State University, and Frank W. Traphagen. Ryon and Traphagen were paid salaries, instead Calvin, arriving from the College of Montana, Deer Lodge, Montana, had to earn her compensation from the fees she charged for music lessons.

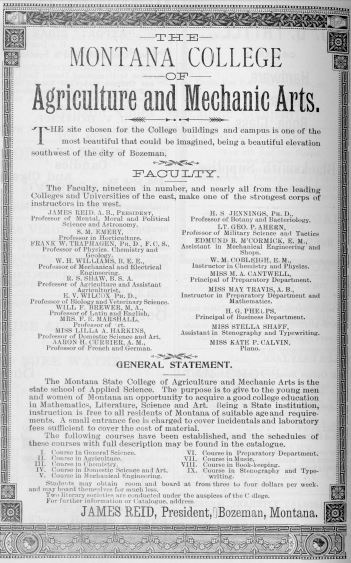
College Exponent, 1898

In Calvin's course special attention was given to thorough technique and correct interpretation, with practical analysis of rhythm and form. Instruction in theory, analysis and history of music was free to all members of the piano department. She used Jadassohn and Emery's Harmony, and those wishing to take a complete course in piano must pass examination in harmony. Frequent recitals were given by the students for the purpose of acquiring confidence in playing at public concerts. Pupils received also special training in memorizing and sight-reading. Pupils not capable of advancement were not encouraged to continue the lessons. Nothing was more unpardonable than for a teacher to permit a pupil to continue work where success could be only partial. Such pupils spent time and money altogether in vain. No definite time was fixed for completing this course. Some made more rapid progress than others, and accomplished in four years what would take others six or eight years to finish. Students who did satisfactory work and passed the required examinations were granted diplomas. Tuition for class lessons, two lessons per week throughout the year, was $45.00 ($22.50 for one semester); for private lessons, one lesson per week throughout the year, $51.00 ($25.50 one lesson per week for one semester); Harmony for five or more students, $15.00 for the entire academic year (one lesson a week); piano rent, two periods each day, $10.00 per year.

$45 in 1900 amounted to $1,239.38 in 2017. Calvin was so successful in earning her salary that by 1901 she was able to build her own house on 609 South Grand, Bozeman. Other than her own house, she built a larger house next door at 613 South Grand to serve as boarding house. Calvin retired from teaching in 1904 and continued with her real estate business.

From 1899 to 1900 she took a leave of absence from the College to spend the sabbatical time in Europe.

In 1922 she was treasurer of the School District 7 of the Kit Carson County, Colorado.

== Personal life ==
In Bozeman, Kate Calvin lived at 609 South Grand (still standing) and owned also the Boarding House at 613.

Calvin died on April 9, 1936, and is buried at Sunset Hills Cemetery, Bozeman, Montana

== Legacy ==
One quad of the dormitory at Montana State College, Quad B, is named after Kate Calvin.
