= Kate Manicom =

British suffragette and trade unionist

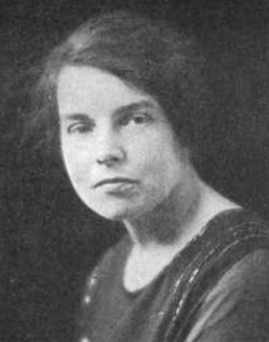
- Kate Manicom, 1921
- Born: 11 March 1893; St Pancras, London, England
- Died: 27 October 1937 (aged 44)
- Occupations: Trade unionist, Suffragist
- Organization(s): Transport and General Workers' Union (TGWU); Trades Union Congress
- Political party: East London Federation of Suffragettes; Labour Party (UK)

Kate Zilpah Manicom (11 March 1893 – 27 October 1937) was a British suffragette and trade unionist.

== Life ==
Manicom was born on 11 March 1893 in the St Pancras area of London, and attended Southfields Girls' School. From 1911, she was active in the women's suffrage movement. She was associated with Sylvia Pankhurst, and worked with the East London Federation of Suffragettes. She also joined the Labour Party and the Workers' Union, for which she worked as an organiser from 1917. In this position, she recruited women workers across the country and played a key role in the strike of Pearl Assurance workers. She visited Peterborough to speak at strike rallies.

The Representation of the People Act 1918 only enfranchised women over thirty, and Manicom was a leading campaigner to extend the franchise to women on the same basis as it applied to men. When the Workers' Union became part of the Transport and General Workers' Union (TGWU), she became a London District Organiser. She also served on the Trades Union Congress Women's Advisory Committee and the Standing Joint Committee of Industrial Women's Organisations. She attended the 1921 International Congress of Working Women, and was a delegate to the International Labour Organization, where she spoke "on behalf of the young women of the world."

From 1924, Manicom worked as a postal clerk, although she remained active in the trade union movement. She died on 27 October 1937, aged 44.
