= Peter M. Yeo =

American business executive (born 1963)

Peter Yeo

Personal details
- Born: May 9, 1963 (age 61)
- Political party: Democratic
- Education: Wesleyan University (BA); Harvard University (MA)

Peter Yeo (born May 9, 1963) is the president of the Better World Campaign (BWC) and the senior vice president at the United Nations Foundation (UNF). Yeo joined UNF in 2009 after more than twenty years in senior roles at the State Department and on Capitol Hill.

As an expert in U.S.-UN relations, Yeo has been featured on MSNBC, Foreign Policy, The New York Times, and The Hill among others. He is also a frequent contributor to The Huffington Post.

Yeo is on the board of the U.S. Global Leadership Coalition (USGLC) and a member of the Council on Foreign Relations (CFR).

== Professional background ==
Yeo began his career on Capitol Hill, as a Legislative Assistant for Rep. Sam Gejdenson (D-CT).

From 1997 to 1999, he served as the Deputy Assistant Secretary at the U.S. Department of State. In that capacity, Yeo led the negotiations around repayment of the U.S. arrears to the United Nations.

In 1999, Yeo went on to be the Deputy Staff Director at the House Foreign Affairs Committee chaired by Rep. Tom Lantos (D-CA) and Rep. Howard Berman (D-CA).

Yeo joined BWC and UNF in 2009 as Vice President for Public Policy at UNF and Executive Director of BWC. He was promoted to President of BWC in 2015. Under Yeo’s leadership, BWC has helped ensure payments from the U.S. government to the UN for six consecutive years.

In 2021, Yeo co-authored a chapter in the book, The North Korean Conundrum, entitled "DPRK Human Rights on the UN Stage: U.S. Leadership is Essential." The book discusses the relationship between human rights and denuclearization, and how North Koreans' limited access to information is part of the problem, and how this is changing.

== Education ==
Yeo received his bachelor's degree in East Asian Studies from Wesleyan University and a Masters in East Asian Studies from Harvard University.
