= Kate Morgan =

American housemaid (c. 1864 – 1892)

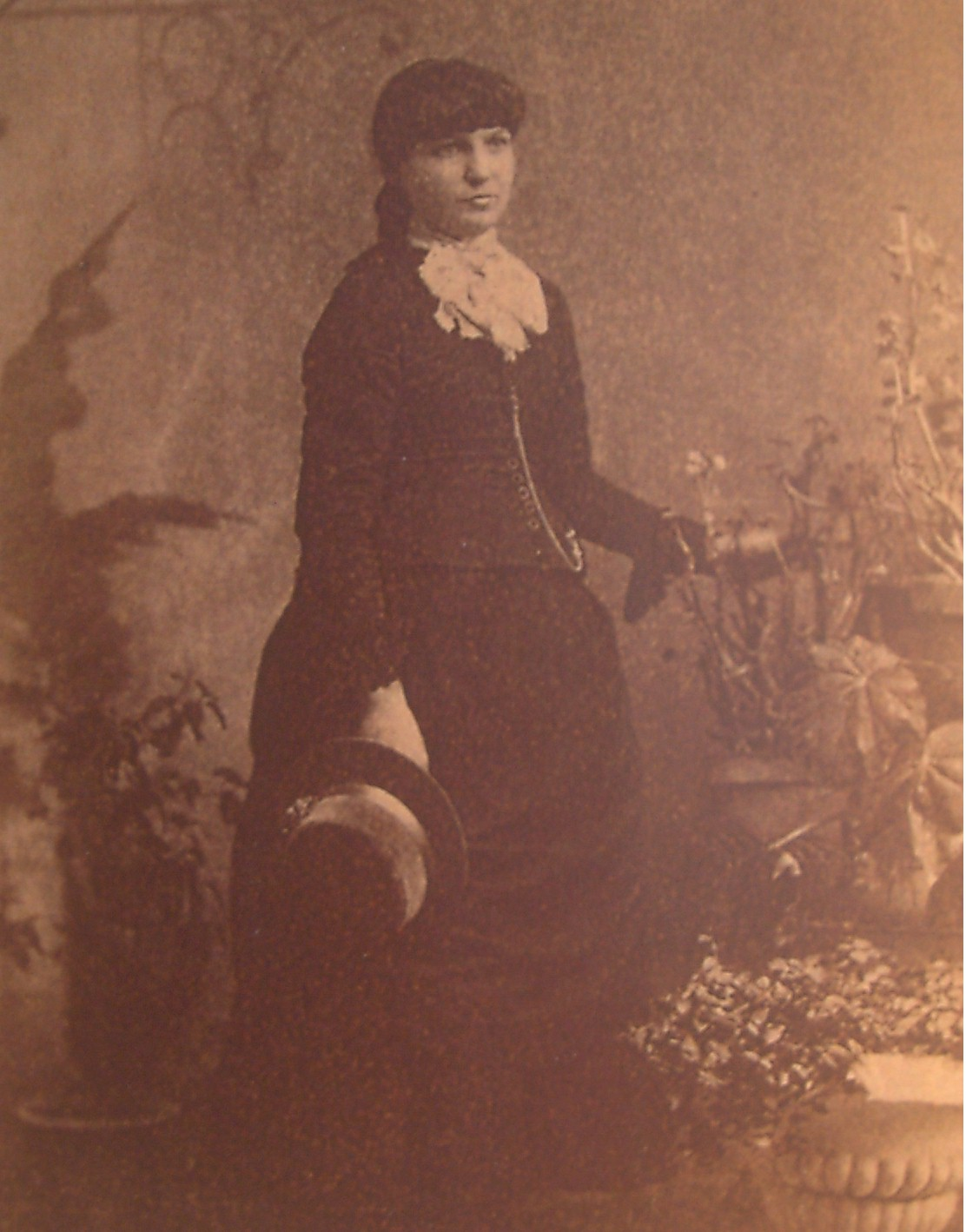
- Kate Morgan circa 1886
- Born: Kate Farmer c. 1864; Fremont County, Iowa, U.S.
- Died: November 28, 1892 (aged 27–28); Coronado, California, U.S.
- Other name: Lottie A. Bernard
- Known for: Ghost of Hotel del Coronado

Kate Morgan (c. 1864 – November 28, 1892) was an American woman who died under mysterious circumstances. She is thought by locals to now haunt the Hotel del Coronado in Coronado, California.

== Background ==
Kate Farmer was born in Fremont County, Iowa, around the year of 1864. Her mother died on September 23, 1865, and from the age of two she lived with her maternal grandfather, Joe Chandler.

On November 9, 1870, her father, George Washington Farmer, was appointed as the Postmaster of Hamburg, Iowa. He remarried in 1871 and had two more daughters. He then moved to Texas, where he died in 1876.

On December 30, 1885, Morgan married Thomas Edwin Morgan. The couple had one child, a boy, born on October 31, 1886; he lived for two days.

Around 1890, Morgan eloped with Albert Allen, a stepson of Thomas' stepmother, Emily Dennison Allen Morgan. This relationship did not appear to have lasted. Although there are few records of Morgan's life at this time, the next time she was reported as being seen, she was ill and alone.

Her next appearance was at the Hotel del Coronado in 1892. She arrived on November 24, checking in under the name "Mrs. Lottie A. Bernard, Detroit." The staff reported that she seemed ladylike, beautiful, reserved, and well-dressed, but troubled and melancholy.

== Death ==
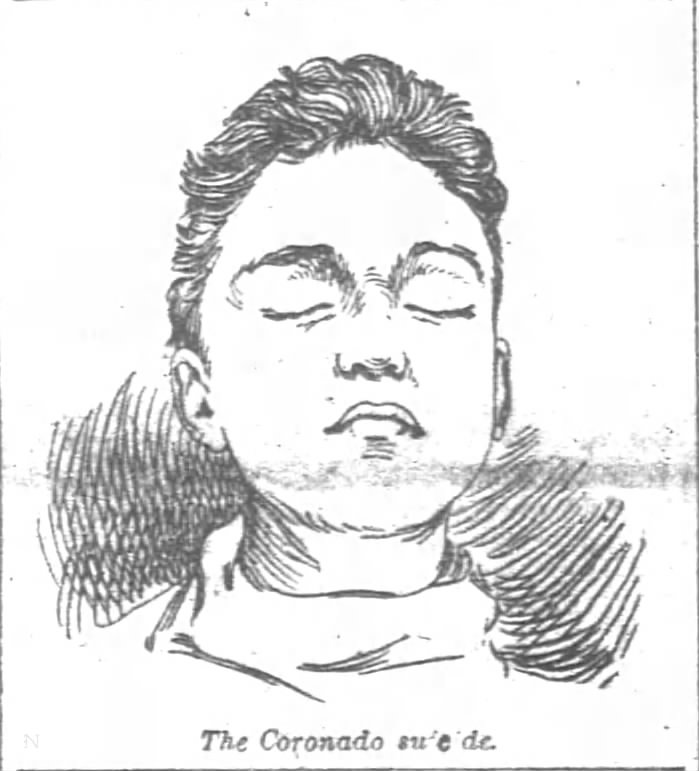
Composite sketch of a woman later identified as Kate Morgan who committed suicide in 1892 in the Hotel del Coronado that was circulated in Californian newspapers at the time.

Morgan was found dead on November 29, 1892, on the exterior staircase of the Hotel del Coronado leading to the beach. Her death was believed to have been caused by a self-inflicted gunshot wound to the head, five days after checking into the hotel.

Morgan was buried at nearby Mount Hope Cemetery in Division 5, Section 1.

A San Francisco lawyer, Alan May, speculated in the 1980s that her death involved foul play. Evidence for the alleged homicide was a passing statement during the coroner's inquest that the bullet found in her head did not match that of her gun. There are many theories as to how Morgan died, however none have been confirmed.

== Sightings ==
There have been many putative ghost sightings of Morgan, and other potential paranormal events at the Hotel del Coronado. The official Hotel del Coronado website mentions the ghost.

The hotel's Heritage Department has published an official book on this subject, written by the hotel's historian, titled The Beautiful Stranger: The Ghost of Kate Morgan and The Hotel del Coronado. It avoids speculation in its research of historical documents available in local public libraries, historical societies, university libraries and city hall and police files. The Heritage Department's book leans toward the official verdict of death by suicide.
