= Kate Yeo =

Singaporean climate activist

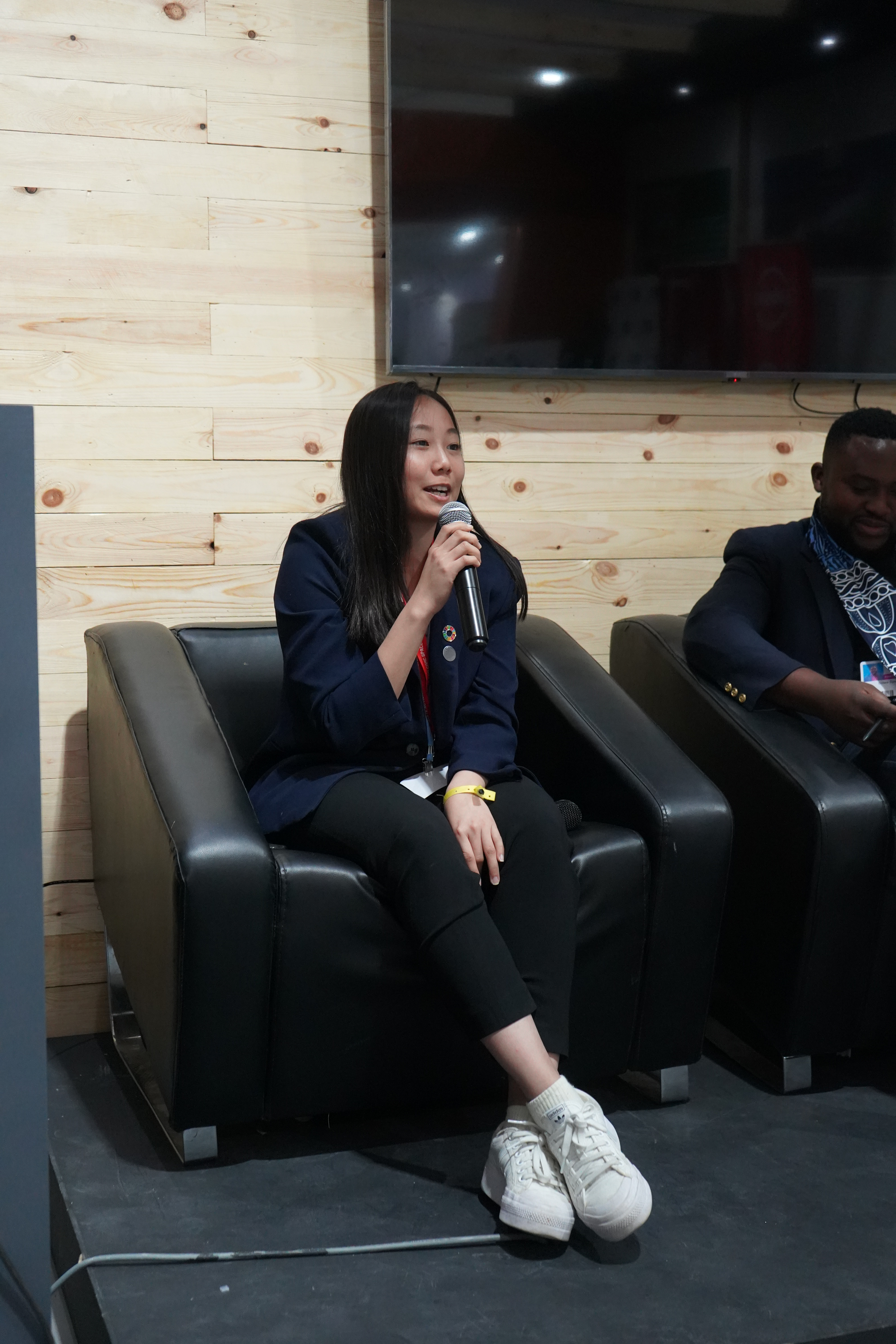
- Born: Singapore
- Education: Dartmouth College
- Occupation: Sustainability advocate
- Organization(s): BYO Bottle SG, Re-Earth Initiative, Fossil Free Dartmouth

Kate Yeo (born 2001) is a youth climate activist from Singapore.

== Activism ==
=== Climate ===
In 2018, Yeo started a campaign BYO Bottle SG to advocate against single-use plastics in Singapore. The initiative has worked with 231 drink stalls and reached out to close to 10,000 people. She achieved 2nd Prize in the Goi Peace Foundation International Essay Contest for Young People for her essay titled “The Battle Against Plastic Pollution”.

Yeo was one of the organisers of the We The Planet climate strikes for Earth Day 2020. She then co-founded Re-Earth Initiative, an international youth-led NGO striving to make the climate movement more accessible to all. She also helped to organise the Virtual Youth Environment Assembly, organised by the U.N. Environmental Programme’s youth constituency. In April 2021, she was a panellist at the Othering & Belonging Summit, alongside writer and climate activist Naomi Klein and other youth advocates Tokata Iron Eyes, Xiye Bastida and Samia Dumbuya. She attended the COP27 conference in Egypt in 2022 to look at how the international trade of carbon credits will be rolled out. After the conference, she spoke about feeling frustrated at the lack of progress but remaining "stubbornly hopeful".

Yeo is also a founder of Fossil Free Dartmouth, a group calling on Dartmouth College to cut financial ties with fossil fuel companies. In October 2023, she co-authored a report criticizing connections between the Arthur L. Irving Institute for Energy and Society and Irving Oil.

In 2023, she was named to the Eco-Business Youth A-List which recognizes "the most impactful young sustainability leaders across Asia Pacific".

=== COVID-19 Initiative ===
During the pandemic, Kate started an initiative to support local hawkers in Singapore. Her family purchased bulk orders of food and drinks which were given to residents at a halfway house.
