= Kate Bell (businesswoman) =

British businesswoman and founder of Zip Us In

- Born: Katrina Louise Bell; Southampton, UK
- Education: Southampton City College
- Occupation: Businesswoman

Kate Bell is a British businesswoman and founder of Zip Us In. In spring 2020, she was featured on BBC's Dragons' Den television program.

== Career ==
She took a role with Newsquest and stepped into media sales with the Southern Property Advertiser.

In 2004, she registered her first company Fate Promotions Limited. In 2013, when Kate was pregnant, she developed an idea for a new and innovative product; a panel of fabric that could expand her own jacket, saving on the cost of a maternity coat. She formed a business named Zip Us In to start production.

She continues to run both business, as well as being an active director for NIPA Baby Limited, a non-profit organisation that works to support independent Nursery brands across the UK.

In 2017, she won the Barclays Entrepreneur of the Year Award. In the same year she also won the VentureFests Innovator of the Year. In 2019, British magazine the Business Game Changer listed her on the UK's Top Ten Women Entrepreneurs.
