= O. L. Rapson =

American hotelier

Oscar L. Rapson
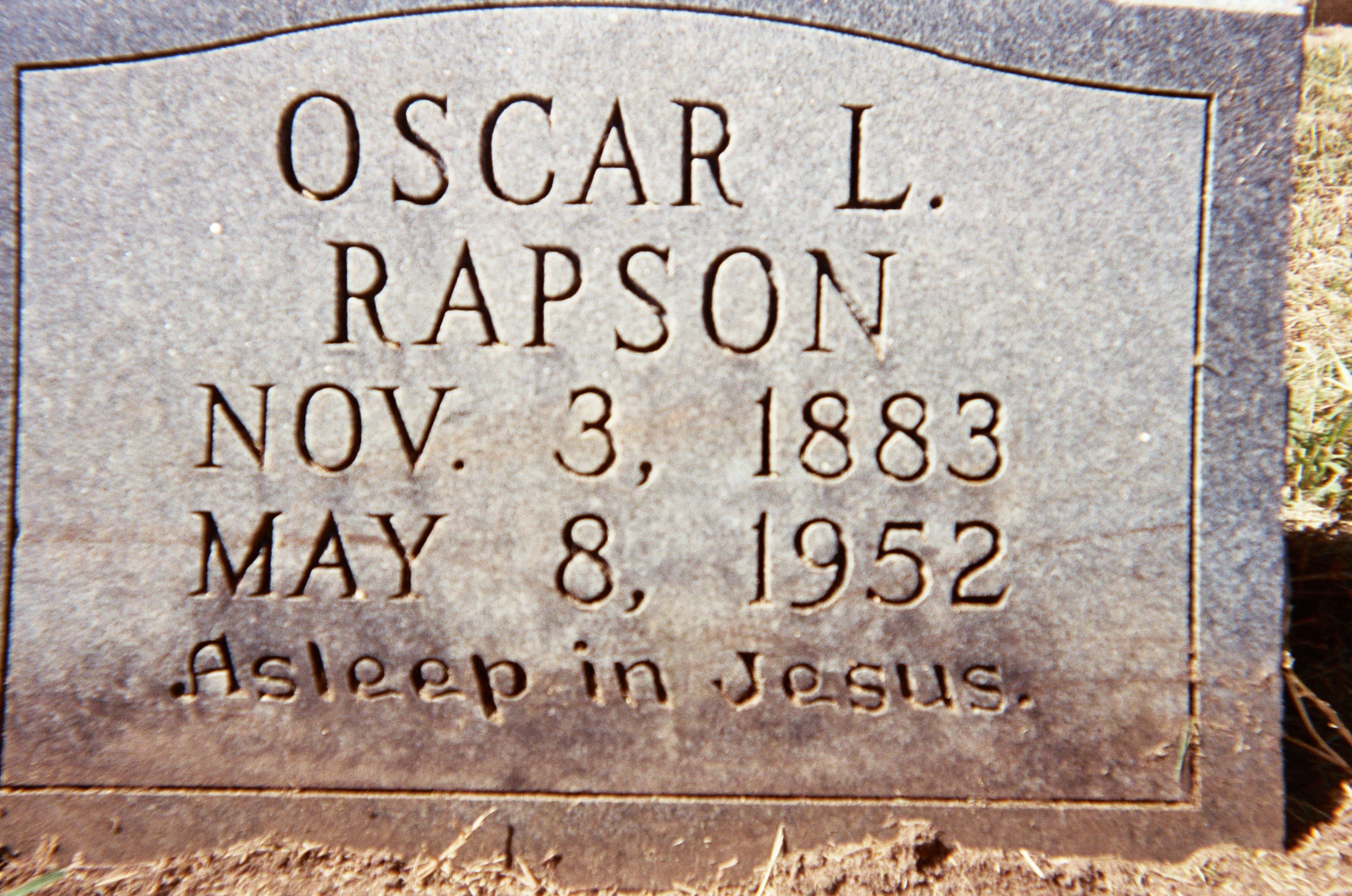
- Born: November 3, 1883; Danville, Illinois, US
- Died: May 8, 1952 (aged 68); Marlin, Texas, US
- Resting place: Calvary Cemetery, Marlin, Texas
- Occupations: Farmhand; Hotel Manager; Convenience store owner Filling station owner Grocer
- Spouses: Willie Helen Magee Rapson; Ida Christian Feller Rapson

Oscar Luscher Rapson (November 3, 1883 – May 8, 1952) was an American farmhand, hotel manager and store owner. Rapson is best known for being the first manager of the Grand Rapids Hotel, which was the first major resort on the Wabash River.

Rapson was born in Danville, Illinois, but both of his parents died within a few years of his birth. Rapson and a few of his siblings were raised by their aunt and uncle in Mount Carmel, Illinois. In his early years, Rapson worked in many low-paying jobs until finally finding a job working on Frederick Hinde Zimmerman's farm. Initially, Rapson was a general farmhand, but after a period of time became the first manager of the Grand Rapids Hotel.

During his tenure as manager of the hotel, Rapson orchestrated many national events and helped the area surrounding the hotel to experience economic growth and notability during his stewardship through an increase in tourism and business at the hotel. While manager at the hotel, Rapson oversaw the creation of a country club and golf course as well as numerous other outdoor recreation facilities including trap shooting facilities, boat tours, hiking trails, surf boat rides, and many others. Additionally, the hotel's restaurant was opened while Rapson was manager and proved to be very successful in attracting organizations and clubs to the hotel. In 1924, shortly after the unexpected death of Frederick Hinde Zimmerman, Rapson was fired and Glenn Goodart replaced him as manager of the hotel.

After the being fired from his position as manager of the hotel, Rapson moved to various small cities in Texas. The first few years after his arrival in Texas, Rapson primarily worked jobs similar to his previous work on the Zimmerman farm in Illinois. Later, after he married and settled in Marlin, Texas, he opened a small general store that sold a variety of items to locals in Marlin, Texas as well as the surrounding area.

== Early years ==
Rapson was born in Danville, Illinois on November 3, 1883. Rapson was one of nine children, but his parents died early and spent the majority of his younger years being raised by his aunt and uncle William and Sarah Riker. Sometime before 1910, Rapson moved to Wabash County, Illinois and began building his career. According to the 1910 US census, Rapson is listed as living with Allen Goodart, who was the brother of Glenn Goodart, the man who would eventually replace Rapson as manager of the Grand Rapids Hotel later in his life. Both Rapson and Allen Goodart were working together as drivers at the Frank J. Cowling Company while living together. After various short-term jobs, Rapson was hired by Frederick Hinde Zimmerman to work on the Hinde family farm in Wabash County near the Hanging Rock and the Grand Rapids Dam. The 1910 federal census shows O.L. Rapson living in a small house next to Frederick Hinde Zimmerman near the Grand Rapids Dam.

== Manager at the Grand Rapids Hotel ==
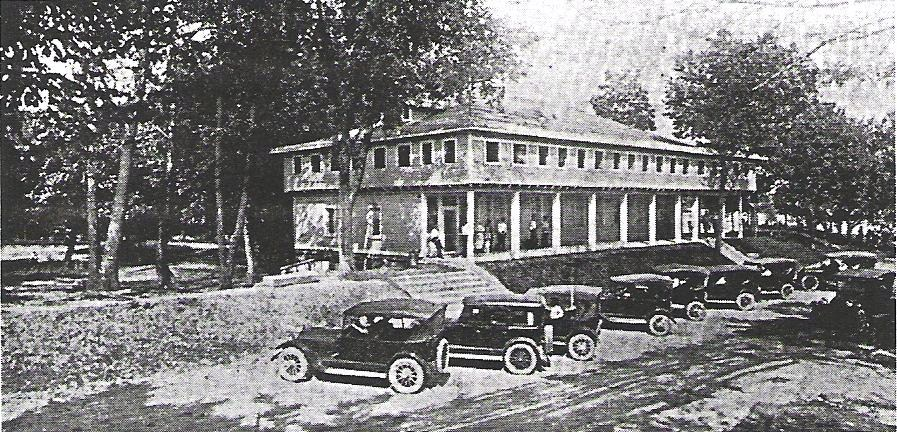
Grand Rapids Hotel, c. 1922

Zimmerman selected Rapson to be the first manager of the Grand Rapids Hotel. Mr. Rapson was regarded as an excellent manager by his guests, and the hotel and was able to immediately attract people from across the country to visit. One source states that, "[The Grand Rapids Hotel] is the most beautiful, interesting and inviting resort[s] in the entire Wabash Valley, and is visited by more people than any other point of attraction on the Wabash River." The restaurant at the Grand Rapids Hotel was under the supervision of Rapson, and he frequently cooked special chicken dinners for hotel guests. Rapson was responsible for bringing in numerous local and national organizations to the Grand Rapids Hotel. One newspaper article stated, "It is an ideal spot, and the hotel is large, commodious place, with Landlord Rapson serving a fine meal." However, in 1924 Frederick Hinde Zimmerman died unexpectedly and Rapson was fired from his management position. Rapson's friend, Glenn Goodart, was subsequently hired by Zimmerman's children to take his place. Not long after his replacement, Rapson left Mount Carmel, Illinois and eventually settled in Texas.

It is also speculated that Rapson was responsible for bringing gangsters associated with the Chicago Outfit to frequent the Grand Rapids Hotel during his tenure as manager. In fact, many sources claim to have witnessed gangsters and alcohol being served in violation of Prohibition during Rapson's time as general manager of the hotel.

Rapson opened the first country club at the Grand Rapids Hotel and the Grand Rapids Dam. The course was a public five-hole course and was located in the field opposite to the dam and behind the Grand Rapids Hotel. The country club founded by Rapson was an instant success, and remained in business until the Grand Rapids Hotel was burned by Glenn Goodart. According to another source, Rapson was also responsible for starting many other successful endeavors at the Grand Rapids Hotel. Specifically, "The hotel also had a trap shoot, baseball diamond, and unlimited camping capacity. It was a touch of elegance ala, French Lick, Indiana."

== After hotel management ==
Clarence G. Rapson, O.L. Rapson's older brother

After being fired from his management position at the Grand Rapids Hotel, Rapson moved to Texas. Immediately after arriving in the state, Rapson found work farming and raising poultry, which was very similar to his previous experiences working on the Zimmerman farm in Illinois. After moving to Marlin, Texas, Rapson was the victim of repeated vandalism. In one case, vandals broke into his garage and stole the casing from wheels off a motor truck he owned. On March 7, 1931, Rapson's older brother, Clarence G. Rapson, died from head injuries from a motorcycle accident while on duty as a police officer in Jeffersontown, Kentucky, in circumstances that were never fully explained due to lack of witnesses and evidence.

Not long after moving to Marlin, Rapson married his first wife, Mrs. Willie Helen (Williams) Magee Rapson, who was thirteen years his elder. Even though their marriage year is not known, they were married and living together in Falls County, Texas by 1930 according to the U.S. Census that year. Rapson was only six years older than his wife's only son, Charles Ross Magee. Rapson's wife died on August 24, 1933, and is buried in Calvary Cemetery in Marlin, Texas. In 1935, less than two years after his first wife died, Rapson married his second wife, Ida Christian Feller, who was also a widow who had been living outside of Marlin, Texas in the small unincorporated village of Otto. After their marriage and sometime near the beginning of 1936, the couple moved to Marlin and operated a small store located on the outskirts of town. On his 1942 World War II draft card for men born between 1877-1897, Rapson stated his occupation was as a service station owner and a grocer. In 1950, after nearly fourteen years of business, Rapson and his wife sold their business to distant relatives of his wife and the couple moved to Mart, Texas and lived in a ramshakle house. The couple eventually moved back to Marlin, Texas less than two years later in January 1952.

In May 1952, Rapson and his wife were visiting family who lived in Waco, Texas when Rapson suffered a massive heart attack and died. There are no known surviving pictures of Rapson. Rapson is buried alongside his first wife in Calvary Cemetery in Marlin, Texas.
