= Glenn Goodart =

American politician

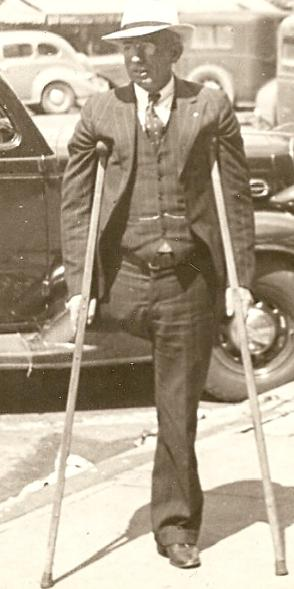
- Born: August 5, 1885; Mount Carmel, Illinois
- Died: November 8, 1948 (aged 63); Olney, Illinois; Olney Sanitarium
- Resting place: Rose Hill Cemetery; Mount Carmel, Illinois
- Occupations: Railroad Conductor; Hotel Manager; Politician
- Political party: Democratic
- Spouse: Vera McClintock
- Children: Leland Goodart
- Parent(s): George Goodart; Emily Wood Goodart

Ira Glenn Goodart (August 5, 1885 – November 8, 1948) was an American railroad conductor, hotel manager, county commissioner and county treasurer. Goodart was raised in Friendsville, Illinois, a small community outside of Mount Carmel, Illinois, in a German Catholic family. After trying a variety of menial jobs Goodart took a position on the New York Central Railroad as a conductor. He held the position with the New York Central until he lost his right leg during a violent train crash in the early 1920s.

After a period of joblessness and a period of time as an alcoholic, Goodart found employment as a hotel manager at the Grand Rapids Hotel and during his tenure he increased the hotel's notability. He stayed five years and much of the time the hotel was in severe debt due to unsuccessful events planned by Goodart and flooding. In 1929, Goodart burned down the hotel under suspicious circumstances. Earlier that year the United States Senate Committee on Commerce had decided to remove the dam at Grand Rapids, which attracted many tourists to the hotel.

Following the hotel fire, Goodart entered politics and won seats in Wabash County's local government. Goodart served as an elected official for 19 consecutive years in various positions with the county and city of Mount Carmel. During his political career Goodart was a member of the Democratic Party and served as county treasurer, county commissioner, county assessor and ran multiple times, but was never elected, for constable and sheriff. Goodart died in November 1948, one year after reelection as county finance commissioner.

== Early years ==
Goodart was born in Mount Carmel, Illinois on August 5, 1885. His father had emigrated from Germany. Goodart's father married twice and Goodart was one of eight children. Goodart grew up in Friendsville with his family. The Goodart home was located nearby the home of Jacob Zimmerman, who was the father of Frederick Hinde Zimmerman, founder of the Grand Rapids Hotel and father of the children who would later hire Goodart in 1924. On August 5, 1909, Goodart married Vera McClintock, the daughter of William T. and Mildred (Poole) McClintock, in Mount Carmel. Two years later in 1911, Goodart and his wife had their only child, Leland.

Glenn held a variety of jobs in Wabash County until 1918 when he got a job working on the New York Central Railroad. Jobs Goodart held before working for the railroad included a clerk at small shops in Mount Carmel, electrician, automobile mechanic, as a worker for the Mt. Carmel Telephone Company and as a truck delivery driver for a furniture company. In his early years, younger brother Allen Goodart, lived with O.L. Rapson, the man Goodart later replaced as manager of the Grand Rapids Hotel at 811 Mulberry Street.

In the early 1920s Glenn was the conductor on the New York Central during a particularly violent crash in which he lost his right leg. After Glenn lost his leg he was unable to work as a conductor and subsequently he joined the Retired Railroad Men's Association where he held various leadership positions.

== Hotel manager ==
Sometime after September 1924 Goodart replaced Rapson to become the second manager at the Grand Rapids Hotel. After the death of Frederick Hinde Zimmerman, Mr. Zimmerman's children decided to allow Glenn Goodart to take over management even though he only had one leg. Initially, Goodart's tenure as manager at the hotel was successful. The years 1925 and 1926 saw massive events and social gatherings that attracted people from across the country. In 1925, while Goodart was in charge, Outdoor Recreation Magazine described the fishing at Grand Rapids as where the "choicest table fish to be found in the river" are located.

Goodart organized two baseball teams at the hotel called the Grand Rapids Steppers and the Mount Carmel Boosters that were successful and played teams in the area. With one leg he served as the manager. He organized multiple clay pigeon shooting contests at the hotel and was often a top finisher.

Success was short-lived and in 1927, 1928 and 1929 Goodart undertook increasingly unsuccessful projects and the hotel lost patronage due to summer flooding. The decrease in tourism and the poor business planning increased pressure on Goodart to find alternative sources of income, possibly illegal. Oral accounts mentioned Chicago gangsters frequenting the hotel in later years as well as liquor service in violation of Prohibition.

== Hotel fire ==
On July 29, 1929, Glenn Goodart burned the Grand Rapids Hotel to the ground by dropping a blowtorch in the basement shop. Even though the fire was during the peak tourist season, the hotel had no guests on that day. Newspaper accounts indicate that the fire burned the entire structure to the ground in a short time. Many people at the time speculated as to whether the fire was intentional, but Goodart was never prosecuted.

The newspaper stated that only a few items were saved, but all of the money from the hotel and restaurant were destroyed even though the cash register was next to the front door and multiple pieces of furniture were carried through the front door before the fire completed its work. Years later it emerged that one of the candy machines that sat next to the cash register was saved and was located in a private collection. Oral accounts of the day the hotel burned state that a local troop of boy scouts were camping at a small beach on the river nearby. They helped carry items out of the hotel.

== Later career ==
Earlier that year the United States Congress had approved a bill to remove Grand Rapids Dam next to the hotel that drew tourists and created favorable fishing conditions.

After the hotel fire Goodart was elected to positions in Wabash County, Illinois before his death in 1948. Goodart first became Finance Commissioner for Mt. Carmel, three months after the fire. He served as County Treasurer for a short time. Goodart was active in social organizations in Wabash County and was a founding member of the Wabash County Chapter of the Moose Lodge. Goodart's only son, Leland Goodart, was an abusive alcoholic who had problems finding steady employment after World War II. He divorced multiple times, leading Goodart and his wife Vera to raise two of their grandchildren.

Using his powers as county assessor and treasurer, Goodart in 1939 organized a school of instruction for property assessors who had charge of making the annual county assessments in Wabash County. While serving as treasurer, Goodart and other Wabash County commissioners attended a meeting on tax policy in Springfield, Illinois in 1940 hosted by the Illinois State Tax Commission and dealt with state tax policy at the county level. In 1942, Ralph Ewald reported to then treasurer Goodart that six of his sheep had been killed by a pack of roving dogs. During World War II Goodart worked part-time at Meissner's Mount Carmel department store. In 1947, one year before his death, Goodart was reelected as a county commissioner in Wabash County, Illinois.

== Death ==
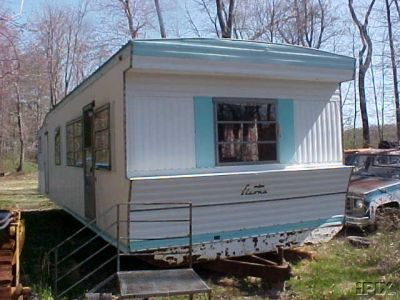
Example of mobile home Goodart's wife and son would have lived in together during the 1960s

Goodart died on November 8, 1948, in the Olney Sanitarium in Olney, Illinois at 6:35 in the morning. His obituary did not state the cause of his death, but instead stated, "He had been in the sanitarium for the past few weeks after taking seriously ill and for days his condition had been reported to be growing steadily worse." His obituary made no mention his time at the hotel. Goodart is buried in Rosehill Cemetery located in Mount Carmel, next to his wife Vera.

Goodart's wife, Vera, died in 1967 at the age of 76 in Tucson, Arizona. At the time of her death, Vera lived in a broken-down mobile home in a trailer park with son Leland, who was living off military retirement checks. Ten years before Vera died she was held up at gunpoint for $53 by Prentice Ray Wilson, who was from Princeton, Indiana while working at the Uptown Theater in Mount Carmel. By 1989, the Goodart family only had one distant cousin living in Wabash County, Illinois, documented by a letter to the editor written by Maude Trusty Goodart then 82, Leland's second wife.
