= Jacob Zimmerman =

American politician

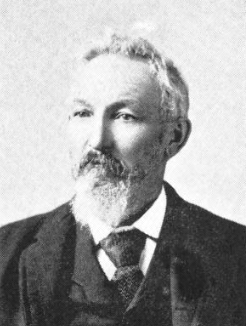

Illinois Representative
- In office 1878–1882

Wabash County, Illinois County Commissioner
- In office 1890s–1900s

Illinois State Highway Commissioner
- In office 1890s–1900s

Personal details
- Born: September 27, 1831 Greensburg, Pennsylvania, US
- Died: March 24, 1912 (aged 80) Friendsville, Illinois, US
- Party: Democratic
- Spouses: Belinda Hinde (m. 1856; died 1865) Emma J. Harris (m. 1875)
- Children: Charles Zimmerman; Frederick Hinde Zimmerman; Herbert Zimmerman; John H. Zimmerman
- Parent(s): Henry Zimmerman; Elizabeth Steelsmith
- Occupation: Illinois Congressman; Newspaper editor businessman

Jacob Zimmerman (September 27, 1831 – March 24, 1912) was an Illinois state legislator, newspaper editor, and businessman. Zimmerman was a pioneer in the newspaper business in Illinois and Ohio, and a businessman who invested in mining, land, and banks in the Midwest. Zimmerman held a number of elected political offices in Illinois before his death in 1912.

== Early years ==
Zimmerman was born in Westmoreland County, Pennsylvania, on September 27, 1831. Zimmerman's father's family emigrated from Germany and his mother's family was of Welsh descent. Zimmerman's parents moved from Pennsylvania to Ohio around 1840.

Zimmerman's father, Henry Zimmerman, purchased farmland from the Wyandot Indians where the family lived in Ohio. Zimmerman was educated in the common and select schools of Upper Sandusky, Ohio.

== Newspaper business ==
At 18, Zimmerman took up the printer's trade by working at the Wyandotte Pioneer in Upper Sandusky, Ohio. After moving from several different newspaper jobs, Zimmerman eventually ended up in Marshall, Illinois, and bought two different newspapers and consolidated them into one paper. This successful endeavor lead to many other acquisitions of newspapers in the following years.

Zimmerman also served as the editor of The Wabash Democrat. In the diaries of Edmund C. Hinde, Zimmerman was said to have gained a substantial amount of weight after he retired from the newspaper business.

== Hinde Farm ==
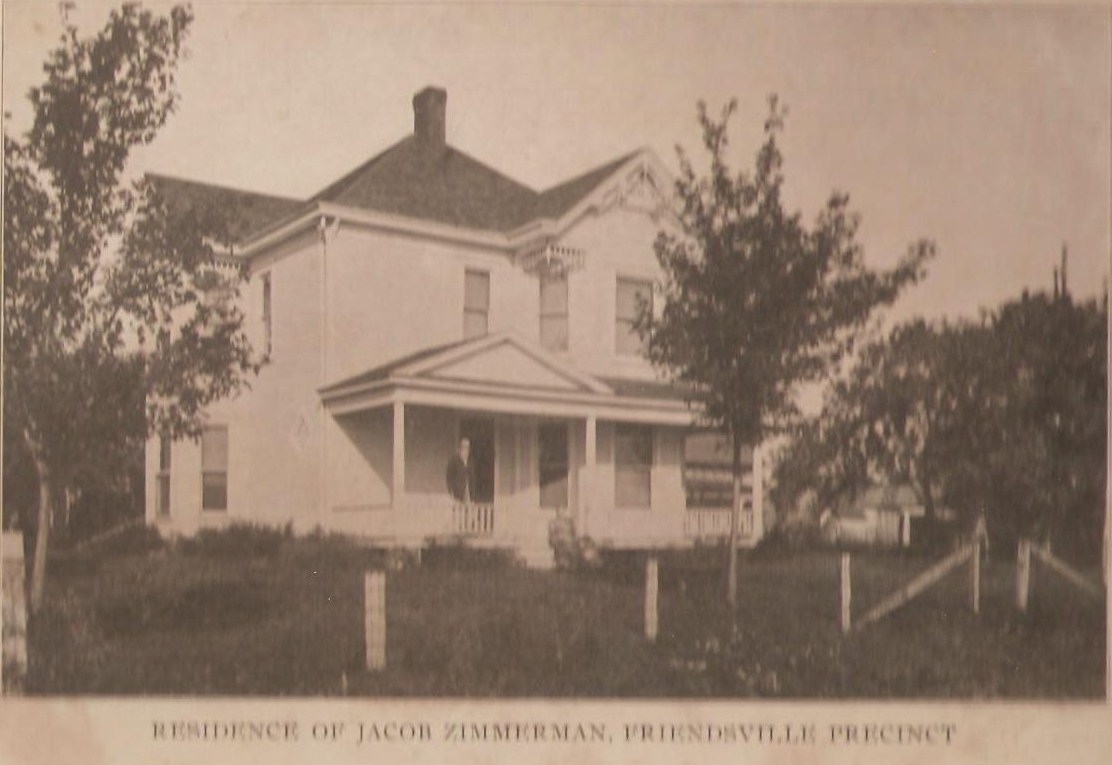
Zimmerman's residence in Friendsville

From 1860 until 1903, Zimmerman lived near the Grand Rapids Dam on the Hinde family farm in Wabash County Illinois. He moved to a 160 acre farm in Friendsville, Illinois in 1903 after he gave his son Frederick the family farm as a wedding gift.

== Election to Illinois House of Representatives ==
In 1878, Zimmerman was elected to represent his district in the 31st General Assembly of the State of Illinois and was reelected for a second term. Zimmerman was a registered Democrat. While a member of the legislature, he secured the passage of funds for the erection of a court house in Mount Carmel, Illinois. During his second term he secured the appropriation for placing the statue of Gen. James Shields in the National Statuary Hall at Washington, D.C. for which he was publicly thanked.

== Later years ==
Zimmerman also served as county commissioner for Wabash County, Illinois and as the Highway Commissioner for the state of Illinois. After his retirement from political office, Zimmerman was active in the Illinois Farmers' Institute. He frequently gave lectures and held positions of leadership until his death.

He died at his home in Friendsville on March 24, 1912.

== Family life ==
He married his first wife Belinda Hinde on December 25, 1856. She was the daughter of Thomas S. Hinde who had founded Mount Carmel, Illinois and had been prominent in religious and political circles all his life. Both Zimmerman and Hinde had been involved with the newspaper business. Together, Jacob and Belinda had two children. Their youngest son, Frederick Hinde Zimmerman, established the Grand Rapids Hotel in Mount Carmel, Illinois.

Belinda died in 1865. Zimmerman married his second wife, Emma Harris, on April 13, 1875.
