= Frederick Hinde Zimmerman =

American businessman

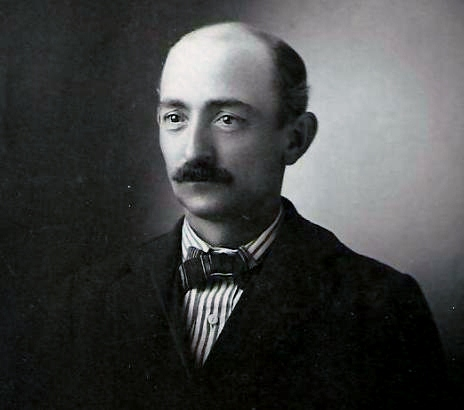
- Frederick Hinde Zimmerman, 1900

Chancellor Commander of the Knights of Pythias lodge in Wabash County, Illinois
- In office 1906–1915

Secretary of the Illinois Farmers Institute
- In office 1901–1903
- Preceded by: J. E. Seiler
- Succeeded by: John J. Ewald

Personal details
- Born: October 17, 1864 Mount Carmel, Illinois
- Died: September 21, 1924 (aged 59) Grand Rapids Hotel; Wabash County, Illinois
- Resting place: Rose Hill Cemetery; Mount Carmel, Illinois
- Party: Independent
- Spouse: Agnes Oldendorf Zimmerman
- Relations: Jacob Zimmerman (father); Belinda Hinde Zimmerman (mother); Dr. Thomas Hinde (great-grandfather); Thomas S. Hinde (grandfather); Charles T. Hinde (uncle); Edmund C. Hinde (uncle); Charles H. Constable (uncle); Harry Hinde (cousin)
- Children: Peter Jacob Hinde Zimmerman; Rebecca Zimmerman
- Parent(s): Jacob Zimmerman; Belinda Hinde
- Occupation: Banker; Farmer; Real estate entrepreneur Hotel Owner
- Positions: Founder, CEO, president, Grand Rapids and Hanging Rock Farms Company (1903–1924), Founder, CEO, president, Grand Rapids Hotel Park Resort Company (1920–1924)

Frederick Hinde Zimmerman (October 17, 1864 – September 21, 1924) was an American banker, farmer, real estate entrepreneur, businessman, and hotel owner. Due to his large land holdings and expertise in farming, Zimmerman became a notable farmer, breeder, and real estate entrepreneur. Zimmerman's farm, originally purchased by his grandfather Thomas S. Hinde from the federal government in 1815, included the Grand Rapids Dam, Hanging Rock, and Buttercrust. His first experience running a business was in 1883 when he ran a grocery store in Fort Smith, Arkansas with his cousin Harry Hinde. Many of his businesses centered on his family farm, but in later years Zimmerman achieved success through his ownership and investment in mines, banks, and real estate. He also owned or invested in the Hanging Rock and Grand Rapids Dam Farm Company, the Grand Rapids Hotel Park Company, and the Wabash Bull-Frog Mines Company.

Zimmerman was among the fourth generation of the Hinde family in the United States that was begun by his great-grandfather Dr. Thomas Hinde. His grandfather Thomas S. Hinde was a prominent politician and Methodist minister who contributed to the development of Illinois, Indiana, and the spread of the Methodist faith. His father Jacob Zimmerman held various political offices in the state of Illinois and in his early years owned several prominent Democratic newspapers in Ohio and Illinois right before the Civil War. At the age of one, Zimmerman's mother died and he was sent to live with family in Ohio and did not see his father again until he was fourteen. Towards the end of his life, Zimmerman was elected to various positions of leadership in the Knights of Pythias and Illinois Farmers Institute. He was elected secretary of the Illinois Farmers Institute for multiple terms. During Zimmerman's life he managed banks, his family farm in Mount Carmel Precinct, Wabash County, Illinois, the Grand Rapids Hotel near the Grand Rapids Dam, and invested in numerous business ventures.

The Grand Rapids Hotel was one of his most notable accomplishments and soon after opening in 1922 attracted tourists from across the nation. The hotel was one of the largest resorts in the Wabash Valley and at one time had fishing, trap shoots, baseball, golf, boating, swimming, a restaurant, and other recreational activities. The hotel promoted the growth of the region by increasing the number of tourists and by hosting large-scale meetings and public events like celebrations at Hallowe'en, Christmas, and the Fourth of July. He died from complications of a broken hip that he suffered near the Grand Rapids Hotel in 1924 after falling out of his Model T automobile. Five years after Zimmerman died, the hotel was burned to the ground – in 1929 the hotel's manager, Glenn Goodart, caused a fire by dropping a blowtorch in the basement. The hotel was not rebuilt due to a lack of funds and the onset of the Great Depression.

== Early years ==
Frederick Hinde Zimmerman was born on his family farm in the Mount Carmel Precinct, Wabash County, Illinois on October 17, 1864. He was the second child of the Honorable Jacob Zimmerman, an Illinois congressman and politician from a wealthy family, and Belinda Hinde, a member of the prominent Hinde family and the daughter of Rev. Thomas S. Hinde, the founder of Mount Carmel. His parents met and were married in Marshall, Illinois while his father ran a newspaper and his mother lived with her sister Martha Hinde and her husband Judge Charles H. Constable. During the Civil War, Zimmerman's father and uncles grew tobacco and operated mills on their family's farm, a portion of which was located on the Wabash River and included Hanging Rock, Buttercrust (a natural sandbar on the Wabash River), and the Grand Rapids Dam. His mother's family were large landowners in Mount Carmel and Wabash County, and the majority of the land had been purchased by Thomas S. Hinde in 1815 from the federal government. Originally, the family farm had belonged to Zimmerman's mother and her siblings, but his father purchased their interests. Zimmerman's father was able to purchase the Hinde farm because he had become wealthy through his ownership of various newspapers in the preceding years. His father lived on the farm near the Grand Rapids Dam from 1860 until moving to a 160-acre farm in the southwestern part of Friendsville, Illinois in 1903.

When Zimmerman was one year old, his mother died and his father sent him to live with family in Ohio. His father owned newspapers in Marshall, Illinois, and in Mount Carmel, Illinois, but by the time Zimmerman was born, he had retired from the newspaper business to focus on running the Hinde family farm and on politics. Based on an entry in Edmund C. Hinde's diaries, Zimmerman's uncle, judge Charles H. Constable, and then his mother died from morphine overdoses that may have resulted from an addiction to the drug developed during the Civil War. Shortly after the death of his mother Belinda, Zimmerman's older brother Charles died at the age of four in Wabash County, Illinois. Zimmerman stayed with his father's sisters in Ohio on a farm that his grandfather Henry Zimmerman had purchased from the Wyandot Indians in the 1840s, until his father remarried (to Emma Harris) in 1875. His father was elected to the Illinois House of Representatives as a Democrat in 1878 and served two full terms until 1882. In 1879 Frederick returned to the family farm in Wabash County, Illinois to live with his father and stepmother. Zimmerman graduated from high school in Mount Carmel, Illinois, and then worked on the family farm near the Grand Rapids Dam until 1883, where he oversaw the farming operations and raised livestock. During his youth, Zimmerman was commonly called "Freddie" or "Freddie boy" by his family and close friends.

In 1883, at age nineteen, Zimmerman and his cousin Harry Hinde were invited by Zimmerman's uncle Edmund C. Hinde to move to Fort Smith, Arkansas, where Hinde lived following his return from the California Gold Rush. After moving to Fort Smith, they owned and operated a grocery store from 1883 to 1886. Judge Isaac C. Parker at this time was in the process of eradicating the brothels, saloons, and outlaws that had taken over Fort Smith through increased public hangings and stiffer criminal penalties and this general lawless environment made operation of the grocery store difficult. This period in the history of Fort Smith has been memorialized in the novel True Grit, and the two movies it inspired, True Grit (1969) and True Grit (2010). The grocery store was unsuccessful, and they sold the business. Zimmerman returned to Mount Carmel, Illinois, but he remained close to his cousin, who later was elected to the Missouri House of Representatives, operated several businesses, and speculated in real estate. In later years, along with their uncle Charles T. Hinde, they invested in real estate and mines in New Mexico. The New Mexico properties only returned modest profits but were kept in the family until the 1950s.

== Family and farming ==
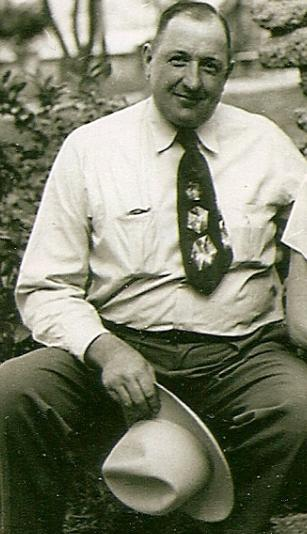
Peter Jacob Hinde Zimmerman, Fred Zimmerman's son

After closing the grocery store in Arkansas in 1886, Zimmerman returned to the family farm and became a gentleman farmer. After Zimmerman returned, his father gave a small acreage of the Hinde farm to Zimmerman's half brother John H. Zimmerman, who raised pigs and farmed the acreage until he sold the property to Zimmerman several years later. Zimmerman was given title to the Hinde family farm by his father on July 13, 1902, after he married Agnes Oldendorf (1872–1922). Agnes was the daughter of Peter and Mary S. Oldendorf who ran a music business and were retail liquor dealers in Mount Carmel. The brother of Zimmerman's wife, Charles Oldendorf, who served as mayor of Mount Carmel, Illinois during the late 1890s, encouraged Zimmerman to join the fraternal organization the Knights of Pythias. In 1906, Zimmerman became chancellor commander of the Knights of Pythias lodge in Wabash County, Illinois and was a captain in the uniform rank of the order.

After receiving title to the Hinde family farm in 1902, Zimmerman built a house near the Grand Rapids Dam. Once construction of the new home was completed, Zimmerman used two horse teams and numerous men to lift his father's old home near the river and move it to higher ground closer to his new house. The couple had two children, Rebecca Zimmerman in 1901 and Peter Jacob Hinde Zimmerman in 1903. Zimmerman and his wife raised their children in the Methodist faith and they attended school in Mount Carmel. From his son's early years Zimmerman trained him to operate the farm and livestock. His son won many awards in livestock shows. Following Zimmerman's death in 1924, ownership of the Grand Rapids Hotel was divided equally between his children. They owned the hotel until it burned in 1929.

In 1901, Zimmerman was elected secretary of the Illinois Farmers' Institute, a position he held for three years. His father also held leadership positions with the Illinois Farmers' Institute and frequently gave speeches on good farming practices, the origin of soils, the road system, and climatic influence on plants. Meetings during his tenure as secretary averaged 350 participating members and a yearlong membership in 1901 cost $71.99. The district director stated that during the tenure of Zimmerman and the other officers they made the institute, "...look very attractive after they fixed it up with flags and bunting." At this time the institute members and Zimmerman were followers of the Grangers Movement, which put emphasis on families to band together to promote the economic and political well-being of the community and agriculture.

Zimmerman was known for raising some of the finest trotting horses in Southern Illinois, and many of his horses were noted for their dressage ability. Zimmerman also operated a successful livestock operation that focused on raising specialty hogs and cattle. He was noted nationally as a breeder and owner of Holstein-Friesian cows by the Holstein-Friesian Association of America. Three of his Holstein cows (Netherland Gem Segis, Kosa Beat Segis, and Vickery de Kol Korndyke) were listed among the best known of the breed in herd and pedigree listings. For a short time Zimmerman and his father raised registered Shropshire sheep primarily for meat, at the family farm near the Grand Rapids Dam. Some of their Shropshire sheep were listed on the American Shropshire Registry, which was a national register for the highest quality sheep of the breed. Zimmerman's son lived on the family farm his entire life and in later years was elected to various public offices in Wabash County Illinois. Like his father, he continued the tradition of raising specialty hogs and cattle. Both men continually expanded the family land holdings and diversified the farming operations.

== Later business ventures ==
In the early 1900s Zimmerman began to invest in other business ventures and strengthen his relationship with his uncle Captain Charles T. Hinde who at that time was living in Coronado, California, and was vice president of the Speckels Brothers Commercial Company in San Diego. Some of Zimmerman's more notable businesses were a coal mine in Indiana, a few mines in the western United States, and a company he co-owned, the Wabash Bull-Frog Mines Company in Nevada and Arizona, which he began investing in from August 1905. Zimmerman's father owned many coal mines in Illinois and Indiana, so in his later years, Zimmerman also invested in some of them. Zimmerman also served on the board of directors of multiple banks in the Midwest, and owned a substantial interest in The First National Bank in Mount Carmel, Illinois.

Zimmerman's primary business at this time was his management of the Grand Rapids Dam and Hanging Rock Farms Company, which was organized to manage the farming operations of the family farm and the increasing number of tourists visiting its Grand Rapids Dam and Hanging Rock sections. The Grand Rapids Dam created favorable fishing conditions, which attracted large numbers of people. Zimmerman also opened a small shop near the dam that sold goods and fishing equipment to tourists, rented boats, and conducted tours. Nick Garrett, originally a hired hand on the Zimmerman farm, managed the store for the Zimmerman family.

== Grand Rapids Hotel ==
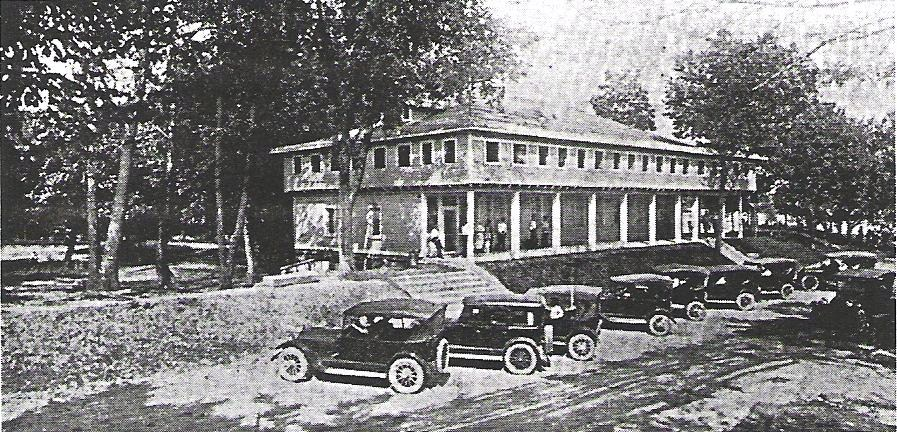
The Grand Rapids Hotel, as it appeared in 1922

Zimmerman's uncle Captain Charles T. Hinde, a shipping magnate who played an important role in the development of Southern California through his various investments with John D. Spreckels and E. S. Babcock, mentored Zimmerman in business strategies. Specifically, Zimmerman and Hinde discussed the Hotel del Coronado investment, which Hinde had contributed to in the late 1880s. Over the years Zimmerman often traveled to Coronado, California to visit Hinde.

When Charles T. Hinde died in 1915, he left Zimmerman and Harry Hinde a substantial portion of his estate. Adjusting for inflation, Zimmerman inherited millions from the estate. After the estate was settled in 1917, Zimmerman decided to use his portion of the money to establish a hotel and resort on the Hinde family farm next to the Grand Rapids Dam; before he could start, he had to wait for the conclusion of World War I. Construction of the hotel likely began sometime in 1919 or 1920 and continued until the hotel was completed on August 7, 1922. A few months after the opening of the hotel, Zimmerman's wife, Agnes, died. The hotel, which was easy to access due to the railroad and Wabash River, was an immediate success and attracted people from across the country. It was advertised in many of the leading national newspapers, and eventually expanded into a full resort with golf, baseball, trap shoots, boating, and many other activities.

Zimmerman chose O.L. Rapson, who had worked at the family farm and lived in a small house next to his, as The Grand Rapids Hotel's first manager. He was fired in 1924 after the sudden death of Zimmerman and replaced by Rapson's friend Glenn Goodart at the request of Zimmerman's children. In 1929, Goodart burned the hotel to the ground by dropping a blowtorch in its basement shop; it was not rebuilt due to the onset of the Great Depression and a lack of available funds.

== Death ==
A few weeks before Zimmerman's death in 1924, he suffered a stroke. He died after an eventful day at the annual fair in Mount Carmel as he was returning to his farm at the Grand Rapids Dam on September 21, 1924. Before returning to his residence, Zimmerman, with his children, stopped by the Grand Rapids Hotel to check on the daily business. As he exited the car driven by his son, he fell and broke his hip. Even though he was treated for his injuries by Dr. G.S. Couch, Zimmerman died the next day. According to his obituary, Zimmerman died of "hardening of the arteries." In his will, he left about seventy-five percent of his estate to his son and about twenty-five percent to his daughter. Some of the stock in The First National Bank in Mount Carmel that Zimmerman left to his daughter caused her financial hardships due to the bank's failure during the Great Depression.

=== Burial site ===
Zimmerman is buried at Rose Hill Cemetery in Mount Carmel, Illinois, next to his father Jacob Zimmerman, his wife Agnes Zimmerman, and his longtime friend and farm hand Nick Garrett.

== Notes ==
Business positions
New office	Chief Executive Officer of The Grand Rapids Dam and Hanging Rock Farms Company; 1903–1924	Succeeded by Peter Jacob Hinde Zimmerman
New office	President and Chief Executive Officer of The Grand Rapids Hotel Park Resort Company; 1920–1924	Succeeded by Peter Jacob Hinde Zimmerman
