= Silas Z. Landes =

American politician

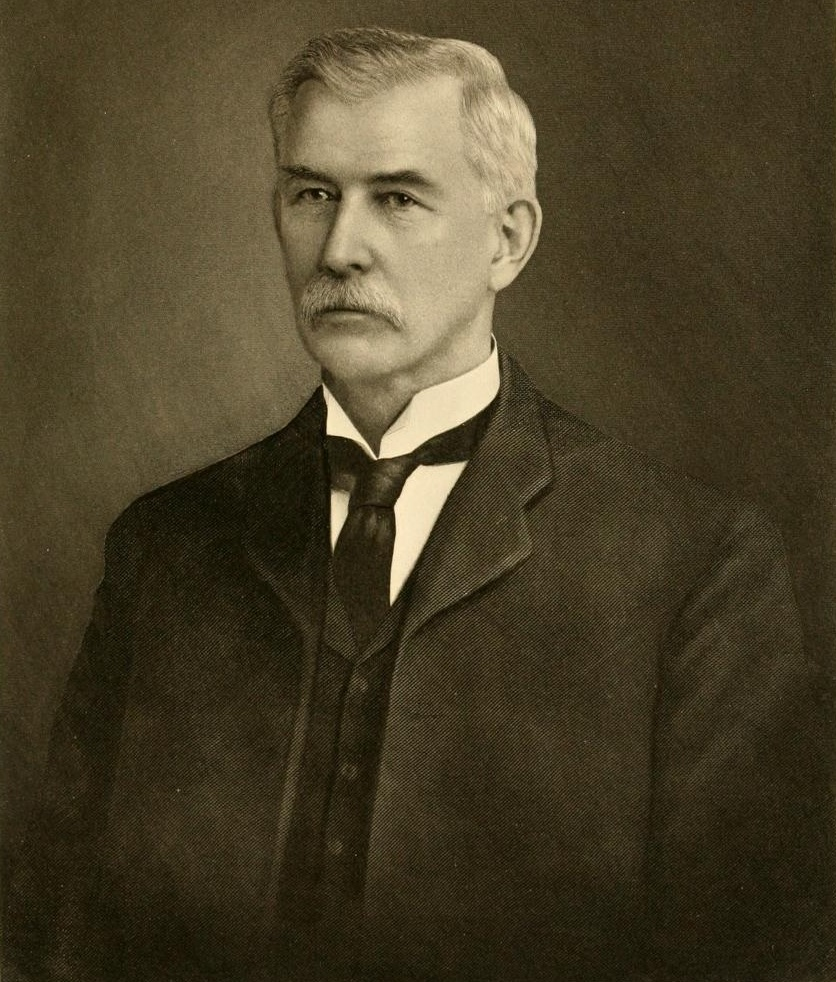
- From 1911's Illinois Historical: Wabash County; Biographical

Member of the U.S. House of Representatives from Illinois's 16th district
- In office March 4, 1885 – March 3, 1889
- Preceded by: Aaron Shaw
- Succeeded by: George W. Fithian

Personal details
- Born: May 15, 1842 Augusta County, Virginia, U.S.
- Died: May 23, 1910 (aged 68) Mount Carmel, Illinois, U.S.
- Party: Democratic

Silas Zephaniah Landes (May 15, 1842 – May 23, 1910) was a U.S. Representative from Illinois.

Born in Augusta County, Virginia, Landes attended the public schools. He studied law. He was admitted to the bar by the Supreme Court of Illinois in August 1863 and commenced practice in Mount Carmel, Illinois. He served as prosecuting attorney of Wabash County 1872-1884.

Landes was elected as a Democrat to the Forty-ninth and Fiftieth Congresses (March 4, 1885 – March 3, 1889). In 1886, Landes appointed James R. Lindsay to the United States Military Academy; Lindsay graduated in 1890 and retired as a brigadier general.

He declined to be a candidate for re-nomination in 1888. He resumed the practice of law in Mount Carmel.

Landes was elected circuit judge of the fourth judicial circuit of Illinois June 1, 1891, and served six years. He resumed the practice of law. He died in Mount Carmel, Illinois, May 23, 1910. He was interred in Rose Hill Cemetery.

U.S. House of Representatives
Preceded by Aaron Shaw	Member of the U.S. House of Representatives from Illinois's 16th congressional district 1885-1889	Succeeded by George W. Fithian
