= George W. Fithian =

American politician

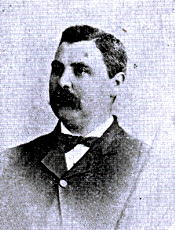

Member of the U.S. House of Representatives from Illinois's 16th district
- In office March 4, 1889 – March 3, 1895
- Preceded by: Silas Z. Landes
- Succeeded by: Finis E. Downing

Personal details
- Born: July 4, 1854 Willow Hill, Illinois, U.S.
- Died: January 21, 1921 (aged 66) Memphis, Tennessee, U.S.
- Party: Democratic

George Washington Fithian (July 4, 1854 – January 21, 1921) was a U.S. Representative from Illinois.

Born near Willow Hill, Illinois to Glover Fithian (1818–1861) and Mary Ann Catt, Fithian attended the common schools. He learned the printer's trade in Mount Carmel, Illinois. He studied law, and was admitted to the bar in 1875 and commenced practice in Newton, Illinois. He served as prosecuting attorney of Jasper County between 1876 and 1884.

Fithian was elected as a Democrat to the 51st, 52nd, and 53rd Congresses (March 4, 1889 – March 3, 1895); in the 53rd Congress, he served as chairman of the Committee on Merchant Marine and Fisheries. He was an unsuccessful candidate for reelection in 1894 to the 54th Congress.

Railroad and warehouse commissioner of Illinois from 1895 to 1897. He resumed the practice of law and engaged in agricultural pursuits and stock raising in Newton. He was also the owner of an extensive cotton plantation near Falcon, Mississippi. He died in Memphis, Tennessee on January 21, 1921, and was interred in Riverside Cemetery in Newton.

U.S. House of Representatives
Preceded by Silas Z. Landes	Member of the U.S. House of Representatives from Illinois's 16th congressional district 1889-1895	Succeeded by Finis E. Downing
