= Juanita Havill =

American children's picture book author (born 1949)

Juanita Havill (born May 11, 1949) is an American children's picture book author best known for the Jamaica books. She has also written a young adult novel, Eyes Like Willy's. She was born in Evansville, Indiana and raised in Mount Carmel, Illinois. She is currently living in Arizona with her husband Pierre. She is the sister of Denis Havel, author of Feldpost, which she edited.

== Bibliography ==
- I Heard It from Alice Zucchini: Poems About the Garden (2006)
- Eyes Like Willy's (2004)
- Jamaica's Blue Marker (2003)
- Brianna, Jamaica, and the Dance of Spring (2002)
- Jamaica and the Substitute Teacher (2001)
- Jamaica's Find (1998), Ezra Jack Keats New Writer Award (1987)
- Jamaica and Brianna (1996)
- Jennifer, Too (1995)
- Saving Owen's Toad (1994)
- Kentucky Troll (1993)
- Leona and Ike (1992)
- The Magic Fort (1991)
- It Always Happens to Leona (1989)
- You Always in My Mind Like Always
