= Hanging Rock (Wabash River) =

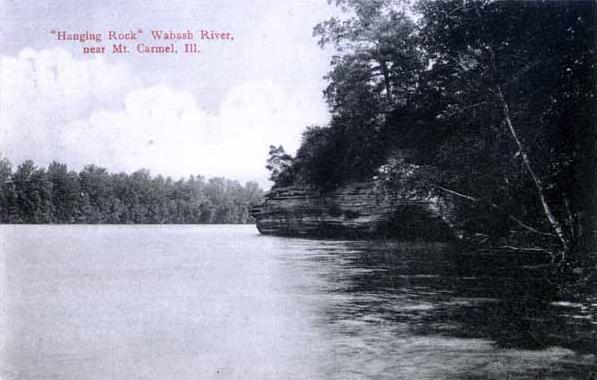
- Postcard of Hanging Rock in the early 1900s

Highest point
- Elevation: 30.5 m (100 ft)
- Prominence: Low
- Coordinates: 38°27′13″N 87°44′54″W

Geography
- Location: Wabash County, Illinois, United States

Geology
- Mountain type: Sandstone

Climbing
- Easiest route: Wabash River

Hanging Rock is a natural sandstone rock formation overhanging the Wabash River in Wabash County, Illinois, in the United States. The rock formation is north of the town of Mount Carmel, Illinois, and located on land originally purchased by Thomas S. Hinde. The formation was formed while the glaciers melted and carved the landscapes of North America. The Native Americans were the first group of people to settle around Hanging Rock. Later the Hinde family purchased the property and used it for tourism and business.

== History ==
Before European settlers populated North America, Native Americans used Hanging Rock and the surrounding area as a campground where they built a series of mounds. These original Native Americans eventually abandoned the area. After being uninhabited for a number of years the Piankashaw Indians settled in the area after the arrival of the French. One source states that Hanging Rock at one time had substantial Indian relics and ancient Indian mound sites. Another source, states that there once existed a village of about 40 wigwams of the Oujatanons at Hanging Rock.

After the treaties signed between the Indians and William Henry Harrison were concluded, Thomas S. Hinde purchased Hanging Rock and the surrounding land. Hinde proposed to the United States Congress that a dam be built at Hanging Rock in 1842. Even though the proposed dam was rejected, Hinde wanted the dam to be a "wing dam half way across the Wabash at Hanging Rock, formed of hewed timber cribs, filled with stone eight or ten feet high, curving at the further end, would give an additional head of five or six feet of water; making a fall of 15 or 16 feet below White River ripple."

In the early to mid-1800s the area around Hanging Rock was a loading dock for steamboats on the Wabash River. Hinde's grandson Frederick Hinde Zimmerman used Hanging Rock as a tourist attraction for a hotel he built named the Grand Rapids Hotel, which was located a short distance downstream near the Grand Rapids Dam.

In 1875, A. H. Worthen named the sandstone located around the area "Hanging Rock" sandstone. He described the sandstone as, "steel-gray, passing into black, and weathering to an olive branch, and filled with crushed shells of small size, among which Rhynchonella Osagensis seemed to be most conspicuous."

In the late 1880s Mount Carmel native Robert Ridgway enjoyed hiking and hunting turkeys with his father around Hanging Rock and in later years published an article that briefly discussed one hunting trip.

== Location ==
Hanging Rock is located on the Wabash River in the state of Illinois about three miles northeast of Mount Carmel, Illinois. Hanging Rock has been described as a "semicircular rock wall which, in the center, rears its huge pinnacle over a hundred feet above the water and projects over the river many feet." The Grand Rapids Dam was located a short distance downstream from Hanging Rock until it was abandoned by the Federal Government in 1931.
