= Willow Hill, Illinois =

- Village
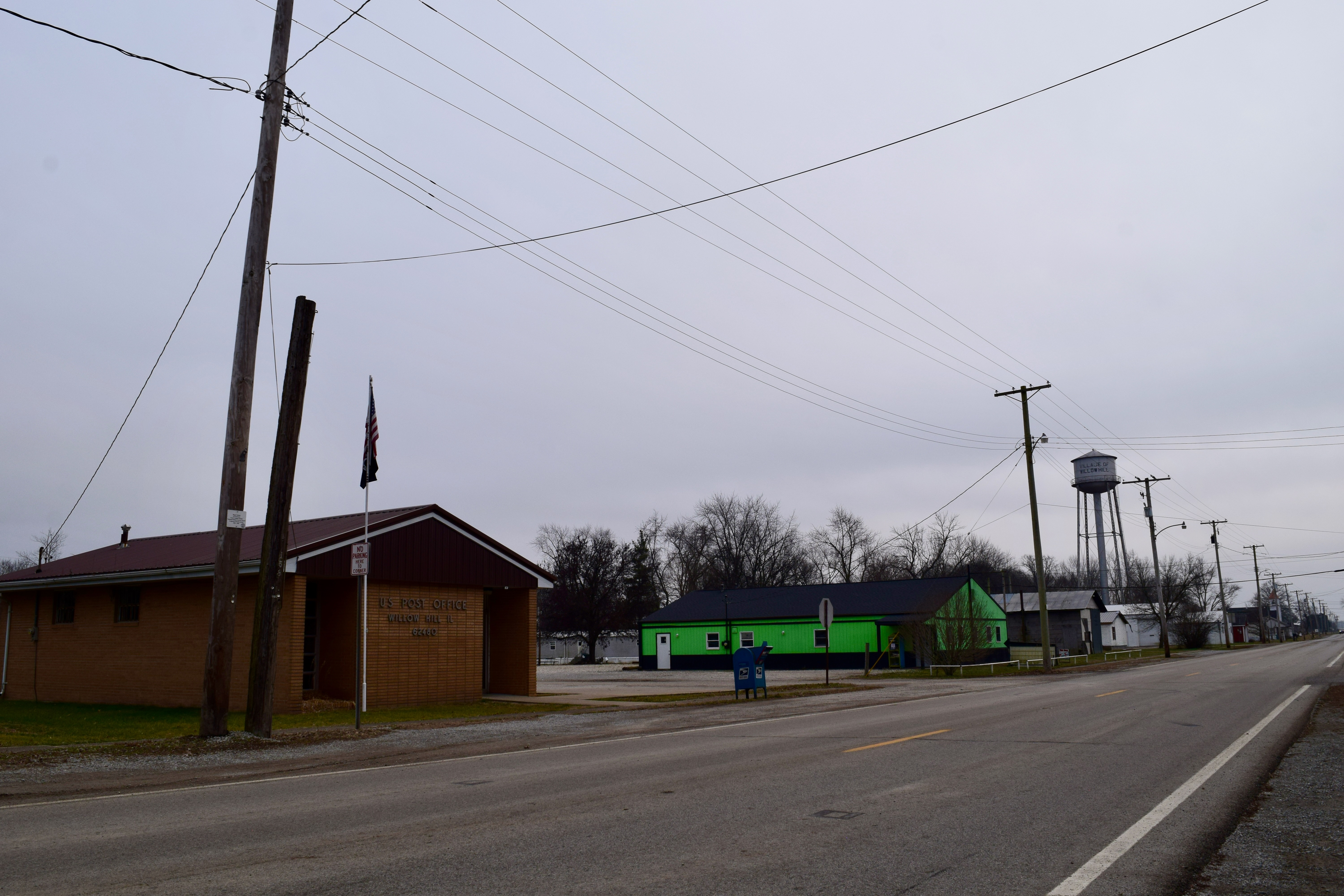

- Location of Willow Hill in Jasper County, Illinois
- Coordinates: 38°59′53″N 88°01′18″W
- Country: United States
- State: Illinois
- County: Jasper
- Township: Willow Hill

Area
  - Total: 1.04 sq mi (2.69 km^{2})
  - Land: 1.04 sq mi (2.69 km^{2})
  - Water: 0 sq mi (0.00 km^{2})
- Elevation: 499 ft (152 m)

Population (2020)
  - Total: 172
  - Density: 165.5/sq mi (63.91/km^{2})
- Time zone: UTC-6 (CST)
  - Summer (DST): UTC-5 (CDT)
- ZIP code: 62480
- Area code: 618
- FIPS code: 17–82010
- GNIS feature ID: 2399700

Willow Hill is a village in Jasper County, Illinois. The population was 172 at the 2020 census.

== Geography ==
Willow Hill is located in eastern Jasper County. It is 1 mile (2 km) south of Illinois Route 33 and 9 miles (14 km) east of Newton, the county seat.

According to the 2021 census gazetteer files, Willow Hill has a total area of 1.04 square miles (2.69 km^{2}), all land. Hickory Creek, a tributary of the North Fork of the Embarras River, flows across the northeast portion of the village.

== Demographics ==
Historical population
Census	Pop.	Note	%±
1900	499		—
1910	444		−11.0%
1920	397		−10.6%
1930	351		−11.6%
1940	372		6.0%
1950	333		−10.5%
1960	335		0.6%
1970	296		−11.6%
1980	292		−1.4%
1990	268		−8.2%
2000	250		−6.7%
2010	230		−8.0%
2020	172		−25.2%
U.S. Decennial Census

As of the 2020 census there were 172 people, 89 households, and 57 families residing in the village. The population density was 165.54 inhabitants per square mile (63.92/km^{2}). There were 85 housing units at an average density of 81.81 per square mile (31.59/km^{2}). The racial makeup of the village was 98.26% White, 0.00% African American, 0.58% Native American, 0.00% Asian, 0.00% Pacific Islander, 0.00% from other races, and 1.16% from two or more races. Hispanic or Latino of any race were 0.00% of the population.

There were 89 households, out of which 23.6% had children under the age of 18 living with them, 40.45% were married couples living together, 19.10% had a female householder with no husband present, and 35.96% were non-families. 32.58% of all households were made up of individuals, and 7.87% had someone living alone who was 65 years of age or older. The average household size was 3.93 and the average family size was 2.99.

The village's age distribution consisted of 37.6% under the age of 18, 11.7% from 18 to 24, 19.1% from 25 to 44, 17.8% from 45 to 64, and 13.9% who were 65 years of age or older. The median age was 28.5 years. For every 100 females, there were 81.0 males. For every 100 females age 18 and over, there were 102.4 males.

The median income for a household in the village was $29,306, and the median income for a family was $29,861. Males had a median income of $30,313 versus $12,500 for females. The per capita income for the village was $13,679. About 33.3% of families and 54.1% of the population were below the poverty line, including 98.0% of those under age 18 and 5.4% of those age 65 or over.

== Notable people ==
- George W. Fithian, attorney and politician
