= Edward B. Green (judge) =

- Born: December 29, 1837; Blair County, Pennsylvania, U.S.
- Died: Unknown
- Occupations: Attorney, Judge
- Years active: 1860-??
- Known for: First chief justice of the Oklahoma Territory Supreme Court

Edward B. Green was an American attorney and jurist who was appointed by Benjamin Harrison as the first chief justice of the Oklahoma Territory Supreme Court on May 4, 1890. (Note: This was the first court with appellate jurisdiction created within the boundaries of the newly-created Oklahoma Territory, which covered the western portion of Indian Territory.) Green, presided over a three-man panel of judges, who were also appointed by President Harrison. The other two judges, known as Associate Justices, were John G. Clark, from Illinois and Abraham J. Seay, from Missouri. Other court officials included Charles H. Filson, as clerk, Warren G. Lurty, as marshal and Horace Speed, as United States Attorney.

== Early life ==
Green was born December 29, 1837, in Blair County, Pennsylvania. He was the youngest of 12 children of Thomas and Martha (née Galbraith) Green. Edward received a primary education in the public school of the county, then attended Reimersburg and Leatherwood Academies, preparing himself to become a teacher at age 17. He became an instructor in languages and then chair of the Department of Languages at the Academy of West Freedom, Clarion County, Pennsylvania.

== Career ==
On October 28, 1858, Green moved to Illinois, where he first settled in Paris, Illinois and went to work and study in the law office of his older brother, Amos, who was a partner of James A. Eads. In June, 1860, Green went to Carlisle, where he was examined by Judge Sidney Brese, a justice on the Illinois Supreme Court. Green passed the exam and, recommended by Judge Brese, was admitted to the bar. On June 20, he went to Mount Carmel, where he opened a solo practice. In 1864, he went into a partnership with Judge Robert Bell. The Bell & Green law firm prospered in Wabash and surrounding counties, and lasted until Green moved to Oklahoma Territory in 1890.

In 1860, Judge Green cast his first vote as a Republican for Abraham Lincoln. Thereafter he became a reliable Republican party stalwart. In 1877, he was nominated as Circuit Judge for the Second Judicial District, a Federal office that required Senate confirmation. In 1879, he was the Republican candidate for Justice of the Illinois Supreme Court. Both attempts for election failed because the Republican Party organization was too weak in his part of the state. He ran for election in 1882 for the Illinois 16th Congressional District and cut the margin between himself and his Democratic opponent of 1880 by more than half. Governor Richard J. Oglesby, also a Republican, seeing Green as a potential winner for the party, appointed him to the state Revenue Commission in 1885. Green ran again for the legislature in 1886. This time he won, and moreover became Chairman of the House Revenue Commission. In 1887, Green was elected President of the Illinois State Bar Association.

=== Oklahoma Territory ===
President Benjamin Harrison appointed Green as the first chief justice of the Supreme Court for the newly-created Oklahoma Territory, effective May 14, 1890.

==== Organization of Territorial Supreme Court ====
This court was divided into three districts. The First District included Logan and Payne Counties (then known as counties 1 and 2, respectively), and would be led by Chief Justice Green. First District also included the unorganized Cherokee Outlet, lands belonging to the Ponca, Otoe, Tonkawa, Missouri, Pawnee, Osage, Kansas, and Kansas tribes, and portions of the Iowa, Kickapoo, and Sac and Fox tribes reservations. Court sessions were designated to be held in Guthrie and Stillwater.

Associate Justice Seay presided over the Second District, which covered Canadian, Kingfisher and Beaver Counties and the rest of the Cherokee Outlet. It also covered the Apache, Arapahoe, Cheyenne, Comanche, Kiowa, and Wichita lands. Court sessions were to be held in Beaver, El Reno and Kingfisher.

Associate Justice Clark presided over the Third District, which included Cleveland and Oklahoma Counties and the southern portions of the Iowa, Kickapoo and Sac and Fox lands. Court sessions were to be held in Norman and Oklahoma City.

One early biographer described Judge Green as "...a profound lawyer, eminent for his judicial bearing and scholarly attainments. He was a gentleman of culture, and, by his uniform courtesy, won the respect of the people and the good will of the bar."

Green summarized the conditions he had to deal with as the first Chief Justice in his report to the President and Congress:

Never before in the organization of territorial course were the same difficulties encountered as in the organization of the courts of Oklahoma. No other territory was opened to settlement in the same manner, and the conditions which confronted the courts at the very threshold of their work were sui generis; and the innumerable questions which arose were entirely without precedent.

As chief justice, Green made a notable ruling that the U.S. government did not have legal authority to kidnap Native American children and put them in American schools without the written permission of their parents. He immediately ordered that an Indian boy named Thomas Lincoln be released from Chilocco Indian Agricultural School (which was located in the territory) be released and restored to his parental home in Iowa.

Although Green's decision had little direct impact outside of Oklahoma Territory, it roiled the rest of the country. Many leaders of other states feared that the precedent would seriously damage the government's policy for educating Indians and potentially empty Indian schools all over the country. Ultimately, the situation was resolved without bloodshed, although the use of military force was threatened on more than one occasion, as explained by Matthew Gilbert's book.

==== Resignation ====
President Harrison's run for reelection in 1892 failed, and he was succeeded effective March 4, 1893, by the incoming Democratic President, Grover Cleveland. Territorial officials had become traditionally patronage jobs, so on that same day, President Cleveland accepted Chief Justice Green's resignation and pronounced Democratic Party candidate, Frank Dale, as the new Chief Justice of Oklahoma Territory. Green promptly returned to his former home in Mt. Carmel, Illinois and resumed his private practice of law.

== Personal life ==
Judge Green married Emma G. Lutes of York County, Pennsylvania on October 23, 1861. They had three children, two daughters and one son. One daughter, Daisy (Mrs. S. L.) Russell, died March 28, 1898, leaving a daughter.
