= Wabash County Courthouse (Illinois) =

Local government building in the United States

Coordinates: 38°24′36″N 87°45′38.8″W

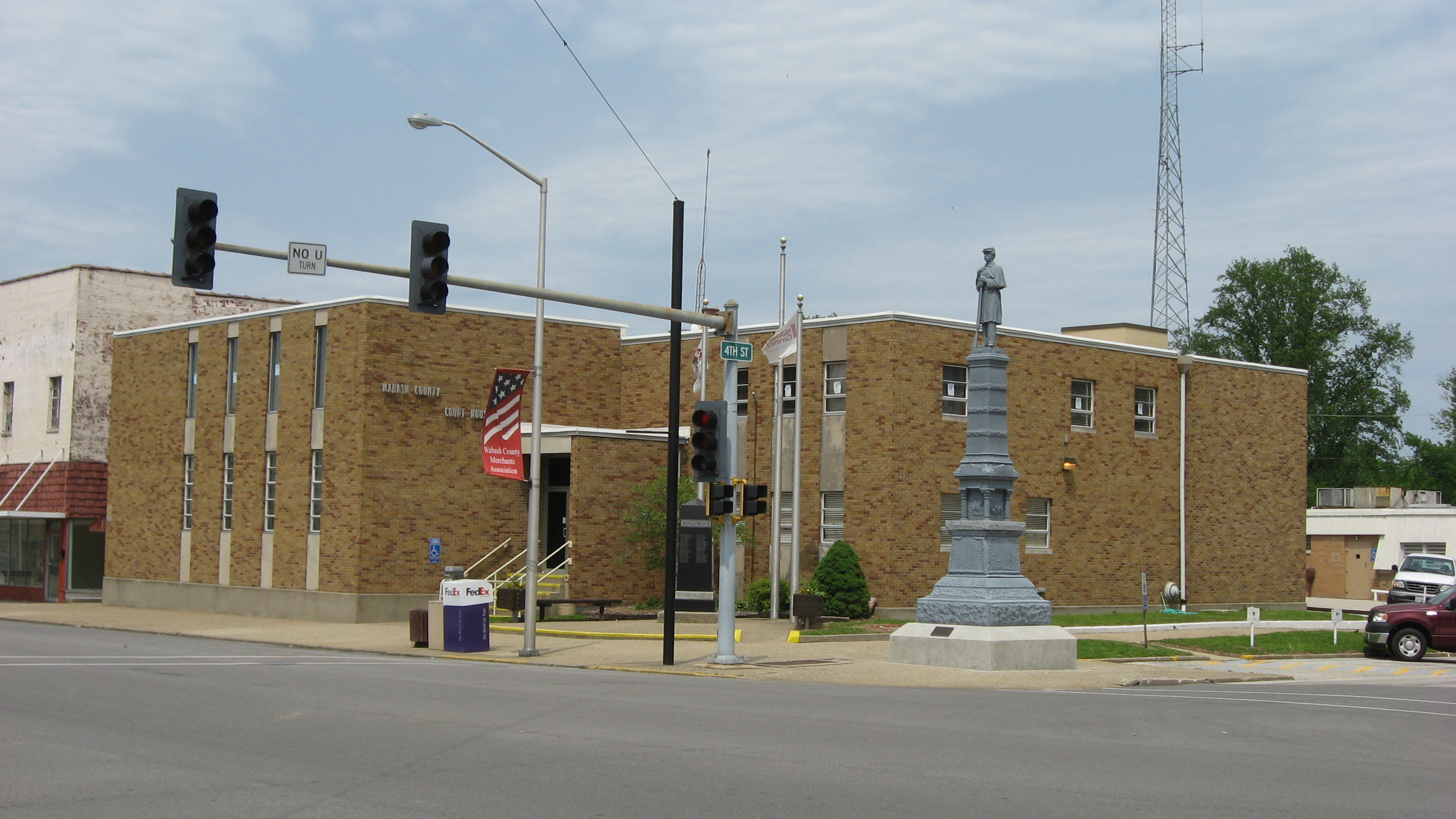
View from the southwest

The Wabash County Courthouse is a historic governmental building in downtown Mount Carmel, Illinois, United States. Built in the late nineteenth century as the fifth courthouse in Wabash County, it has experienced a series of extensive remodelling projects that have left it with virtually nothing of the original building.

== County seat history ==
When Edwards County was formed in 1814, Palmyra was named its first county seat; at the time, the county's boundaries embraced nearly half of the present-day state of Illinois, substantial parts of modern Wisconsin, and some parts of the Upper Peninsula of Michigan as far north as the Canadian border. Palmyra's tenure in this position was short-lived, as the growing population in the county's western portion sparked a county seat war in 1824: violence nearly erupted when the county seat was moved to Albion, but peace was restored when the two sides agreed to work together to convince the Illinois General Assembly to divide Edwards County into two separate counties. This goal was accomplished in December 1824, with Palmyra and other eastern parts of the county being placed within the boundaries of the new Wabash County. However, the law moved the county seat several miles away to Centerville, although within a few years the seat had again been moved, this time to Mount Carmel.

== Previous courthouses ==
=== First courthouse ===
No purpose-built courthouse was ever built in Palmyra; throughout the years that it was the county seat, county officials rented the house of Gervase Hazleton, beginning with a rent of $8 but lowering their annual rent to just 6¼¢ for the entirety of the second year.

=== Second courthouse ===
The second courthouse in the county, and the first after the county's creation, was built in Centerville in 1826. County commissioners contracted with miller Moses Bedell in September 1825 for the construction of a frame courthouse, two stories tall and measuring 26 by 36 feet (7.9 m × 11.0 m). After the courthouse was finished nine months later, Bedell was paid $715 for the project. As Centerville soon began to fall into oblivion, county officials decided in 1829 to move to the flourishing settlement of Mount Carmel, and the old courthouse was abandoned.

=== Third courthouse ===
No substantial opposition arose to the idea of moving the county seat to Mount Carmel, except for that of expense, but local resident Scoby Stewart obviated the opposition by offering in March 1829 to donate $4,000 for the construction of a courthouse in the city by March 1831. County officials readily accepted his offer and began soliciting bids for the location. Constructed with a square plan, the two-story building featured a cupola at the center of its hip roof. Entrances were on different sides of the exterior, which was divided into three bays on some sides and two on others. This building lasted until 1857, in which year it was destroyed by fire, along with virtually all of the official records stored therein.

=== Fourth courthouse ===
Contractor Hiram Bell completed a replacement courthouse by the end of 1857 on the site of the previous building. This building, which cost the county $6,770, was a Greek Revival building with an appearance resembling a church with a substantial wing. This building remained until June 1877, when a tornado struck Mount Carmel and destroyed most of the business district; the storm was so fierce that state legislators appropriated $15,000 in relief funds, and it arose so fast that county officials were unaware of its presence until it began knocking down the building, interrupting a routine meeting that they were conducting.

== Current courthouse ==
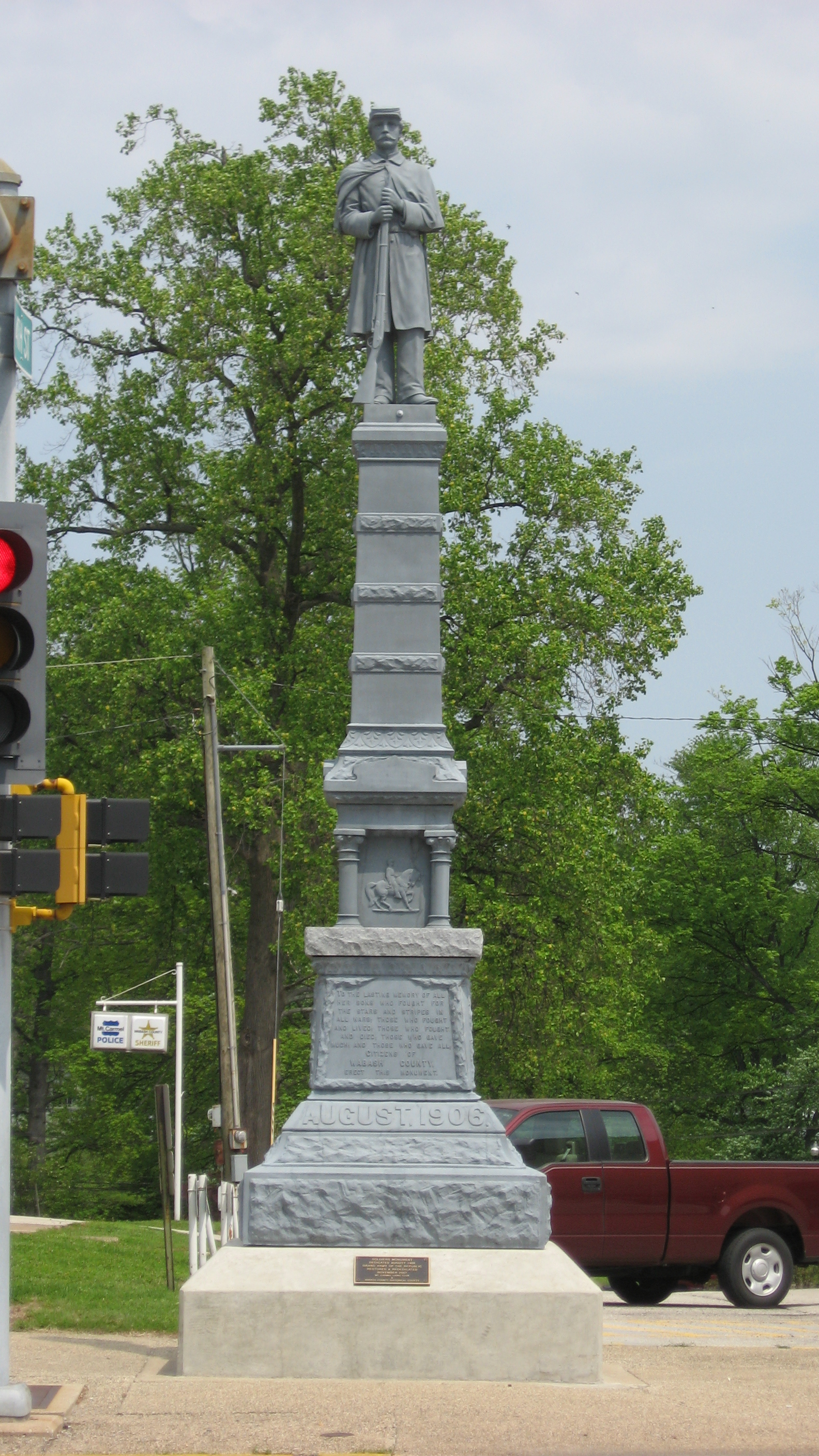
Front of the war memorial

Plans were created for the construction of the current courthouse as early as June 1879, but the final contract waited nearly two years to be signed. It was built primarily as a brick building, although stone was used for the water table and windowsills, and extensive woodworking was placed in the interior. Towers were constructed, topped with iron fence and accessible via trapdoors from within the building. The resulting Second Empire structure featured three stories of interior space under all but the lowest sections of its mansard roof.

During 1959, county officials spent large sums of money on an extensive remodelling project, followed by another project in 1963; the resulting two-story building features a main entrance inside an ell, a few tall rectangular windows on all sides, and a flat roof. Although the current courthouse is technically the same building as the one constructed in 1881, absolutely nothing remains of the original construction, and the courthouse's record in the Illinois Historic Sites Survey Inventory refers to it strictly as "2 story ugly brick (recent)" without any additional comment.

Located adjacent to the courthouse on its southern side is a war memorial featuring a soldier who stands atop a pedestal. Placed during the second half of the nineteenth century, the memorial was temporarily removed for cleaning in 2007, but it was soon returned to its normal place.
