= Grand Rapids Hotel =

The Grand Rapids Hotel
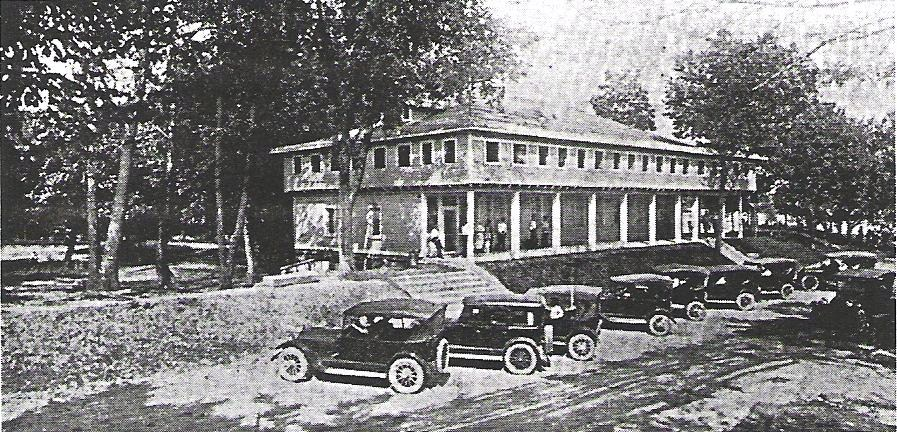

General information
- Location: Wabash County, Illinois; Wabash River; United States, Grand Rapids Dam; River Road; Wabash County, Illinois
- Coordinates: 38°26′11.54″N 87°44′39.15″W
- Opening: August 7, 1922
- Closed: July 24, 1929 (blowtorch fire)
- Owner: Frederick Hinde Zimmerman
- Operator: O. L. Rapson; Glenn Goodart

Design and construction
- Architect: Reid Brothers

Other information
- Number of rooms: 36
- Parking: River Road

The Grand Rapids Hotel also known as The Grand Rapids Resort, was a hotel that existed outside of Mount Carmel, Illinois, in Wabash County, Illinois, United States in Southern Illinois from 1922 to 1929. The hotel was located on the Wabash River next to the Grand Rapids Dam on land that was originally purchased by Thomas S. Hinde. Before the hotel was built, the property where the hotel was located was a site of a former homestead, and was used by Frederick Hinde Zimmerman for multiple small shops that sold goods to fishermen and tourists.

Frederick Hinde Zimmerman was the founder and owner of the hotel, and he completed construction and opened the hotel to the public on August 7, 1922. The hotel had 36 rooms and one large assembly room that served as a dining room, meeting hall, and was used for weddings, exhibitions, anniversaries, and other important occasions. The hotel was one of the first major resorts on the southern portion of the Wabash River and quickly was able to attract tourist from across the country because of its location on the river and ease of access provided by the railroad. During its nine-year existence the hotel established a reputation for luxury and high quality.

In later years, after manager Glenn Goodart took over operation of the hotel, it gradually began to lose patronage due to incompetent business planning and flooding of the Wabash River in the summers of 1927, 1928, and 1929. On July 29, 1929, Glenn Goodart burned the Grand Rapids Hotel to the ground by dropping a blowtorch in the basement shop. Three months before Goodart burned the hotel down, the United States Senate Committee on Commerce had decided to remove the Grand Rapids Dam by revoking funding. Due to the onset of the Great Depression shortly after the hotel was burned down, it was not rebuilt. The same year Goodart burned the hotel down he was elected as Finance Commissioner for Wabash County, Illinois.

== History ==
The land the hotel was built on was formerly part of a Piankeshaw Indian summer campground. Thomas S. Hinde purchased the property in 1815 from the United States Government and quickly with other Methodist ministers founded the city of Mount Carmel, Illinois. To help entice people to settle in the city Thomas S. Hinde created the Wabash Navigation Company and eventually was able to charter a dam to be built next to the property where the hotel was later built. After the Grand Rapids Dam was completed the dam and Hanging Rock drew large numbers of tourists in the decades that followed.

Frederick Hinde Zimmerman, the grandson of Thomas S. Hinde, and the nephew of Captain Charles T. Hinde, built the Grand Rapids Hotel next to the Grand Rapids Dam in 1922. Construction of the hotel began in the early 1920s and was announced as being officially completed on August 2, 1922. According to the article that described the hotel, it had 36 rooms, bathing, boating, various other amusements, and was "...one of the greatest resort centers in the Wabash valley." The August 1925 edition of Outdoor Recreation Magazine described the fishing at Grand Rapids as where the, "...choicest table fish to be found in the river..." are located.

Some people claim that gangsters referred to as the Chicago Outfit associated with Al Capone would take the train from Chicago and stay at the hotel. It is not known if the men were smuggling liquor in violation of Prohibition or merely vacationing. Other commentators have suggested that the blowtorch fire started by manager Glenn Goodart may have actually been a cover for an alcohol still explosion in the basement. No matter the cause of the explosion it has been conclusively proven that alcohol was served at the hotel in violation of prohibition.

== Architectural style ==
One source states that hotel design was partially based on the Hotel del Coronado in San Diego, California. Captain Hinde was a wealthy man who was an investor in the Hotel del Coronado with John D. Spreckels. It has been suggested, but has not yet been proven that the Reid Brothers designed the Grand Rapids Hotel because of Hinde's close relationship to the brothers while he lived in Evansville, Indiana. Moreover, the Reid Brothers designed Hinde's house and church in Coronado, California in 1887.

== Operation ==
The Grand Rapids Hotel was the first major hotel in the region and had a nine-hole golf course and a baseball diamond on the grounds. During the hotel's operation, it was managed by O.L. Rapson and Glenn Goodart. Rapson managed the hotel from 1922 until 1924, and Goodart managed the hotel from 1924 to 1929. Many of the leading social organizations of the time had meetings or other social events at the hotel's restaurant and grounds. In 1929, the hotel burned under mysterious circumstances due to a blowtorch incident involving Goodart.

=== Baseball ===
The hotel had two baseball teams during its nine-year existence. The first team was the Grand Rapids Steppers and it existed from 1925–1927. The second team was the Mount Carmel Boosters and it only existed during the 1928 season. The baseball teams that the hotel sponsored and managed were very successful and played teams from all around the area. Baseball teams from Hazleton, Vincennes, Grayville, Bicknell, Evansville, Haubstadt, Salem, Marion, Benton, Wheatland, Johnson, and Sparta played at the baseball diamond on the Grand Rapids Hotel grounds. Both teams were managed by hotel manager Glenn Goodart.

== Blowtorch fire ==
The Grand Rapids Hotel burned to the ground on July 24, 1929, due to a suspicious blowtorch incident involving Glenn Goodart. According to newspaper articles, Goodart was alone and accidentally burned the hotel by dropping a blowtorch. At the time, there were suspicions whether the fire was intentional, but Goodart was never prosecuted for arson. Goodart had only one leg due to a train accident. Shortly after the hotel burned down, the Wall Street crash of 1929 occurred and the hotel was never rebuilt due to a lack of money caused by the Great Depression. Goodart became Finance Commissioner for the City of Mount Carmel, Illinois, three months after the Grand Rapids Hotel was destroyed.

== Present condition of hotel site ==
The hotel and dam concrete remains still exist and are visible. The front steps of the hotel can be viewed from the river road outside of Mount Carmel, Illinois.

== See also ==
- Roaring Twenties
- The Great Depression
- Mount Carmel, Illinois
- Wabash County, Illinois
- Southern Illinois
- Wabash River
- Don Liddle
- Blowtorch
- Arson
- Hotel del Coronado
- Chicago Outfit
- Al Capone
- Prohibition
