= Friendsville, Illinois =

- Unincorporated community
- Location within Illinois Location within the United States
- Coordinates: 38°30′11″N 87°48′59″W
- Country: United States
- State: Illinois
- County: Wabash
- Elevation: 472 ft (144 m)
- Time zone: UTC-6 (Central (CST))
  - Summer (DST): UTC-5 (CDT)
- Area code: 618
- GNIS feature ID: 408767

Friendsville is an unincorporated community in Wabash County, Illinois, United States. Friendsville is 7 miles (11 km) west-northwest of Mt. Carmel.
