= Grand Rapids Dam =

Grand Rapids Dam (Wabash Locks and Dam)
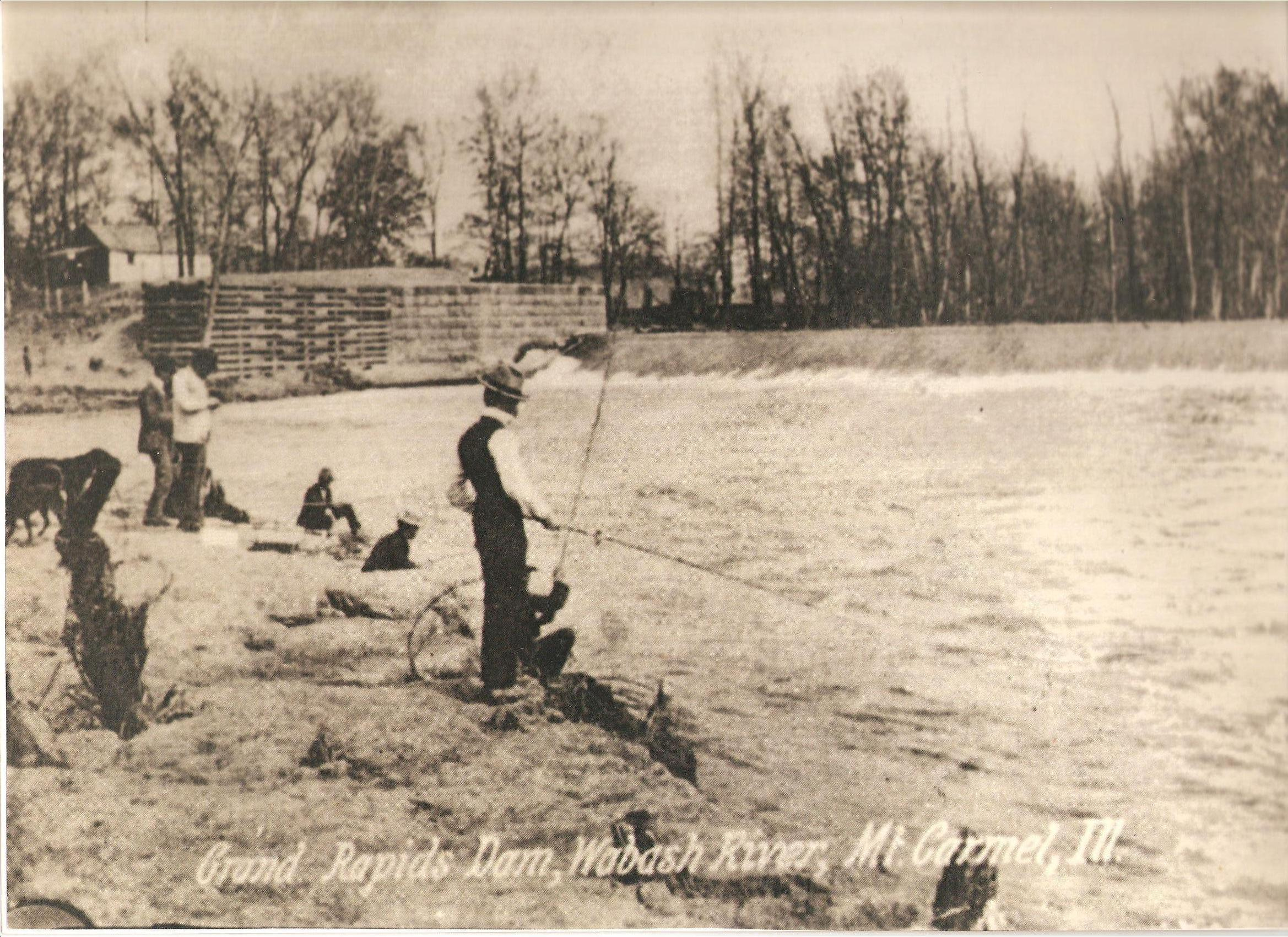
- View of men fishing at the Grand Rapids Dam near Mount Carmel, Illinois in Wabash County, Illinois.
- Official name: Wabash Lock and Dam, Grand Rapids Dam, or Wabash Locks
- Location: Wabash County, Illinois and Knox County, Indiana, US
- Coordinates: 38°26′7″N 87°44′28″W
- Construction began: 1897
- Operator(s): Tennessee Valley Authority

Dam and spillways
- Impounds: Wabash River

The Grand Rapids Dam was a dam located on the Wabash River on the state line between Wabash County and Knox County in the U.S. states of Illinois and Indiana. The dam was built in the late 1890s by the Army Corps of Engineers to improve navigation on the Wabash River. The dam was located near Mount Carmel, Illinois.

== Background and construction ==
The Wabash Navigation Company was originally commissioned to build the Grand Rapids Dam. Its charter was approved by the Illinois and Indiana legislatures in the early decades of the nineteenth century. President Andrew Jackson vetoed the project during his administration in the 1830s, refusing any federal support.

Eventually the state of Indiana allowed the Wabash Navigation Company in 1849 to construct the first timber crib structure as part of it. Thomas S. Hinde first surveyed the area where the dam was proposed to be built. After completing the survey, he recommended that the dam should be built. As it happened, he recommended a site next to property that he owned, which would give him access to the water power provided by the dam.

Although the first stages of work happened in 1849, the construction of the concrete-and-stone lock and dam was not completed until 1897 and cost $260,000. After the dam was built, it was a popular tourist destination because of the improved fishing conditions below the dam, where water levels could be kept advantageous for the fish and they fed in the turbulence. In 1922, Frederick Hinde Zimmerman built the Grand Rapids Hotel next to the dam to take advantage of this attraction. The lock and dam were abandoned in 1931.

Next dam upstream	Mississippi River	Next dam downstream
none	Grand Rapids Dam	Brainerd Dam
