= Coyote (person) =

Mexico–US migrant smuggler

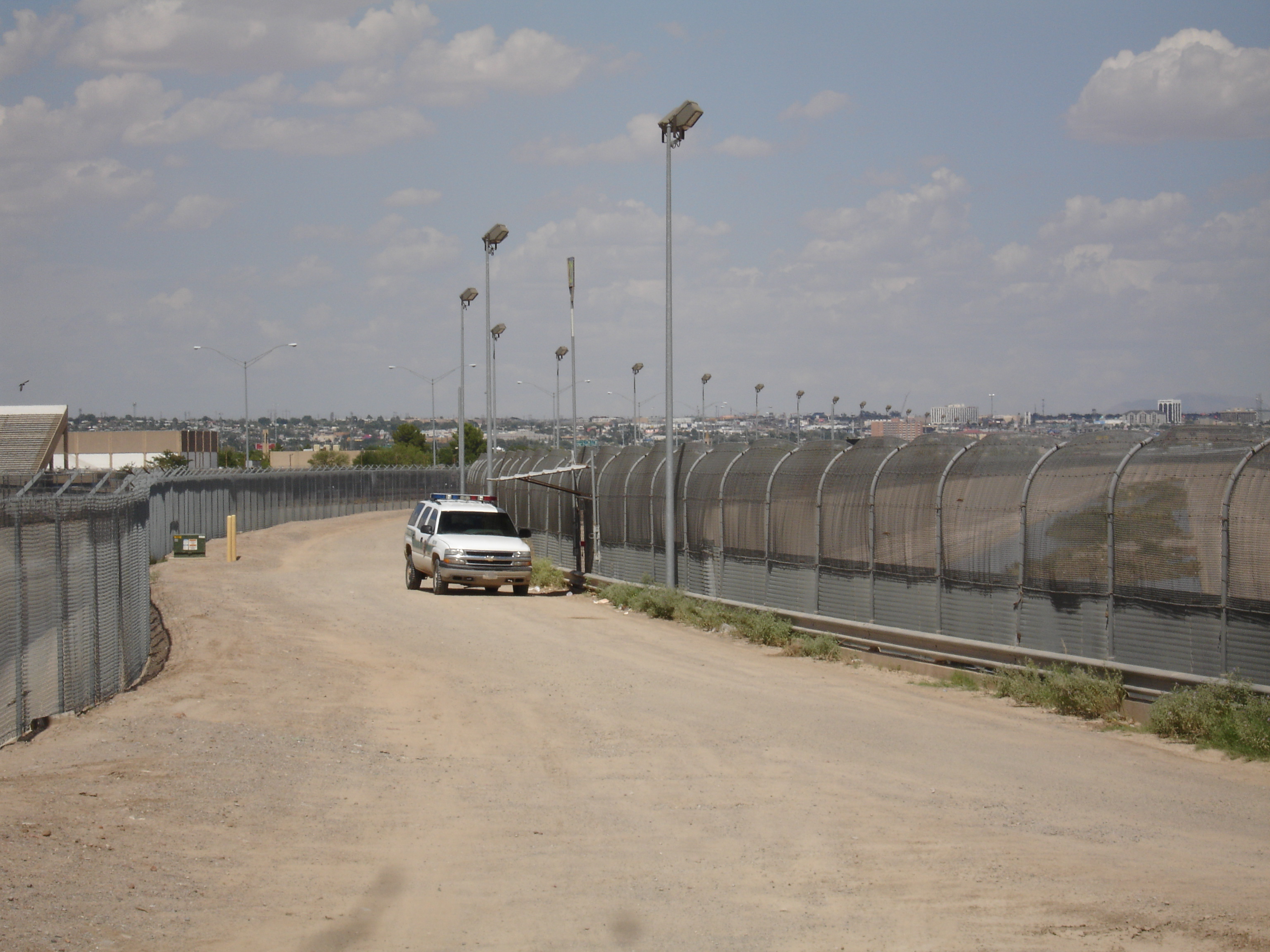
US-Mexican border fence near El Paso, Texas

Colloquially, a coyote is a person who smuggles immigrants across the Mexico–United States border. The word "coyote" is a loanword from Mexican Spanish that usually refers to a species of North American canine (Canis latrans).

Migrants pay coyotes a fee to guide them across the border. Fees are normally collected once the migrant arrives at a predetermined destination, usually a border city in California, Texas, or Arizona. Since the 1990s, the proportion of migrants who hire coyotes has increased drastically as a result of intensified surveillance along the border.

== Background ==
=== Early system: 1882–1917 ===
Since the end of the nineteenth century, coyotes have been a part of the illegal migratory process for many Mexican migrants. From 1882 to 1917, a series of U.S. legislations contributed to the rise of the coyote in illegal border crossings. The Chinese Exclusion Act in 1882 and Immigration Act of 1885 caused the flow of labour to decline. This led to severe labour shortages in the south-western and western regions of the country.

The demand for Mexican workers from U.S. employers rose and by 1884, supply was guaranteed when the railway connection of El Paso, Texas, with Mexico was completed. The illegal migratory crossings were largely unregulated and accepted as de facto acceptable practices.

"Enganchadores", Spanish for "hookers" (from the verb "to hook"), were Mexican individuals hired by U.S. employers as labour recruiters. Enganchadores would persuade Mexican peasants to travel on the railway in acceptance of American jobs. The enganche system was not a novelty in Mexico. It had been established to recruit southern peasants for work in northern industries within the country. Companies in the United States effectively used the system to satisfy their labour needs. It can be argued that enganchadores are an ancestor of the modern-day coyote. Like today's coyotes, they acted as middlemen between migrants and the United States.

Explicit restrictions on Mexican immigration during the late 1910s and early 1920s caused U.S. labour-seeking migrants to increasingly rely on middlemen for labour-brokerage with American companies.

=== Labour-brokerage coyote: 1917–42 ===
The U.S. Immigration Acts of 1917 and 1924 required foreign individuals crossing the border to take literacy tests, undergo medical exams, and pay head taxes and visa fees. The new requirements "combined with the creation of the Border Patrol in 1924, prompted thousands of Mexican migrants to cross the Rio Bravo surreptitiously to enter the country." As a direct result, demand for coyotes grew exponentially. The U.S. Commissioner of Immigration observed the trend commenting, in a Congressional report, that a "new and thriving industry... having for its object the illegal introduction into the United States of Mexican aliens on a wholesale scale by means of organized efforts" had emerged.

Ciudad Juarez became a hub for coyotes during the mid-1920s. In his study on Mexican migration, anthropologist Manuel Gamio details the process. Coyote fees were considerably less than those needed for visitor's visas; an approximate $100 to $150 difference (based on today's exchange rate). Working individually, or with others, a coyote would lead his client across the Rio Bravo via automobile, boat, or by swimming. Crossings were widely successful as Gamio notes: “These people know their ground thoroughly... and sometimes even have an arrangement with some district official.” The prevalent use of false documents, or "leased" legitimate documents, contributed to the success.

Increased restrictions on migrants, including ones from Mexico into the U.S. were primarily starting to be put into place in the 1920s, although there was not a national quota restricting Western Hemisphere immigrants until 1965. Increasing restrictions caused the demand for cheap migrant labour to exceed the legal ability for foreign workers to enter and work in the country. The conflict between the Nativist demand for restrictions and the many business owners who wanted less expensive labour, lead to a demand for unauthorized persons to be brought into the country. This led to an economic draw for desperate people to illegally enter as well as reasons for employers in the U.S. to use and support illegal methods to get more migrants into the country illegally to have more workers than the quota allows for. Therefore, both groups required the help of guides to get migrants into America, requiring the help of the coyotes and similar groups.

Upon arrival in the United States, coyotes were paid their fees and migrants were delivered to their employers. Competition for Mexican workers grew so high among labour contractors that it inspired a short-lived coyote system in the United States. For a fee, "man-snatchers" would kidnap Mexican workers from one company and deliver them to a competing firm. The threat of losing money, on account of a stolen employee, "led labour contractors to keep workers en-route to employers locked up and under armed guard to prevent their theft."

Labour-brokerage coyotes continued to profit despite the Great Depression. Demand in Texas for cotton harvesters through the use of coyotes allowed them to recruit about 400,000 migratory workers by the end of the 1930s, two-thirds of which were Mexican. Coyotes would load trucks with fifty to sixty workers to be delivered to different Texas companies. The practice received international attention in 1940 when a "delivery" truck got into an accident, resulting in forty-four Mexican migrant injuries and twenty-nine fatalities, including eleven children. The U.S. and Mexican governments worked together to end labour-brokerage coyote, by implementing the Bracero Program in 1942.

Research on the Nogales border region in the 1930s has also revealed links between migrant smuggling, corruption, and border control. In a 2023 study, historian Laura D. Gutiérrez examined Ramón Preciado, a Mexican smuggler known as a coyote, who was accused by migrants and local residents of extortion and other abuses. The case also included claims that he worked with officials on both sides of the border, showing how corruption helped the smuggling business operate during that time.

=== The Bracero Program: 1942–65 ===
The popularity of the Bracero Program resulted in a greater Mexican demand for guest-worker contracts than there were contracts to give. Consequently, thousands of Mexican laborers unable to participate in the program sought the help of coyotes to enter the United States. "Clandestine-crossing" coyote saw a rise during this period.

By 1950, the United States Border Patrol relied on approximately 1,000 agents to patrol the border. Mexican migrants seeking entry relied on the coyote. Crossing the Rio Grande became the route of choice. This was achieved mostly by boat with the help of a patero (boatman), or more dangerously, by swimming, thus creating the slur "wetbacks.”

In 1953, Border Patrol reported to have detained 1,545 "alien smugglers" along the border. The end of the Bracero Program would lead to greater illegal crossings.

=== Clandestine-crossing coyote: 1965–86 ===
The Hart-Celler Act, passed in 1965, set strict quotas on the number of annual visas it issued. More than ever before, Mexican workers in search of American jobs were dependent on the coyote system to accomplish their goals. A study reports that, by the 1980s, "do-it-yourself" border crossings were rare and "virtually everyone" was paying a coyote. The coyote industry's prosperity garnered the attention of the U.S. and Mexican governments. U.S. authorities continued to expand the Border Patrol, while the Mexican government enacted laws penalizing individuals convicted of aiding illegal entry into the United States.

Coyote strategies evolved during this period. Some Mexican cities witnessed the emergence or growth of smuggling rings. Larger organizations had expansive networks with contacts across Latin America. Several of these rings were capable of moving an estimated eight to ten thousand migrants into the United States annually. The use of tractor-trailers to carry passengers across national lines proved to be extremely effective. Hidden compartments were built in the floors of truck beds to hide "cargo." Furthermore, coyote leaders strategically chose juveniles as drivers or guides, so as not to be tried in the United States if caught. That way they could then be recycled into the system.

=== The Immigration Reform and Control Act (IRCA): 1986–93 ===
The IRCA was passed in 1986 under the Reagan administration. It created an amnesty program allowing currently undocumented immigrants the opportunity to legalize their status in the United States and eventually obtain citizenship, and established employer sanctions against individuals hiring undocumented workers. To obtain amnesty, migrants had to demonstrate they had been continuously living in the United States since 1982. Documents of proof included "pay stubs, rent receipts, bank statements, and affidavits from persons who knew them during the period they had resided illegally."

The IRCA also required employers to ask potential employees for documents confirming their authorization to work in the United States as a result of both provisions, a black market of counterfeit documents emerged catering to the demand. Shortly after, the media covered numerous stories revealing a coyote network of document falsification. The Houston Chronicle reported that "flea markets, grocery store lots, even the more secluded corners of Hispanic restaurants, are increasingly the scenes of blatant wheeling and dealing of phony documents at premium prices."

Research on migrant smuggling between Mexico and the United States has shown how the work of coyotes changed as border controls became stricter. In a study based on interviews with 100 Mexican smugglers between 2008 and 2012, researcher Simón Pedro Izcara Palacios found that smugglers increasingly used several middlemen and made payments to help migrants cross the border. The study also showed that some smugglers worked with U.S. employers to transport migrants from their hometowns to their final destinations.

== Present-day strategies ==
=== Different roles of coyotes ===
Since the practice of human smuggling is a financially growing sector, many people want to participate in the business. To guarantee a successful journey for the immigrants, human smugglers have created an organized hierarchy of coyotes playing various roles. Demand for their services increased due to the U.S. implementing stricter laws and patrolling the border. Each role plays a part in the process of transporting immigrants.

The lowest position in the human smuggling hierarchy is the vaquetón. While the human smuggling organizations are headquartered at the border, vaquetones are assigned to recruit migrants within their communities at the interior of the country. After vaquetones recruit a busload of immigrants eager to cross the border, migrants are placed in hotels near the border, waiting patiently for a coyote to signal an opportunity to cross the border. As the coyotes are the primary means in getting immigrants across the border, they use nicknames to avoid being identified. Being responsible for guiding the immigrants to the border safely, human smugglers have kept up to date with the border patrol's new technologies, monitoring their surveillance activity, aware of border patrol shift schedules and their stations.

Another important role in the human smuggling hierarchy is the chequador. The chequadores work for the coyotes and the coyotes’ assistants, keeping an eye out at checkpoints and border patrol areas enabling them to signal for a safe crossing. They are provided with the same quality equipment as the border patrol agents, such as night-vision scopes, and consistently use their cell phones or two-way radios to track patrol movements. To make the chequadores’ job less suspicious, they often rent a room near the border and set up telescopes to have a better view.

Cuidandonos are also known as caretakers. Most are American children that are hired from local high schools who, if caught, will receive a less severe punishment. They distract border patrol agents by throwing rocks at them, or by removing tire spikes set on suspected transport routes while immigrants cross the border. After successfully crossing the border, immigrants are transported to a load house (safe house), usually located at the nearest large city.

Bosses, also known as patrones or socios, are the highest rank of hierarchy in the coyote business. The bosses' duties are to manage the finances and business aspects of the operation. Due to the coyotes being the primary source to guiding the immigrants through the border, the bosses heavily depend on them. Most commonly the bosses fund the process and are the owners of the hotels, safe houses and vehicles used in the process.

=== Post-9/11 border patrol ===
Since 9/11, the U.S. government has taken numerous measures to tighten security along the southern border. Part of the Border Patrol's mission statement declares that "an ever-present threat exists from the potential for terrorists to employ the same smuggling and transportation networks, infrastructure, drop houses, and other support and then use these masses of illegal aliens as ‘cover’ for a successful cross-border penetration." Increased surveillance makes clandestine crossing much more difficult, but not impossible. In reality, when economic conditions in Latin America deteriorate, the motivation to come and work in the U.S. only rises, leaving potential migrants one realistic option – engaging a coyote.

Avoiding the attention of the border patrol even as the security and restrictions increase, and helping migrants get around them is the primary focus of coyotes. This is because it is their job to guide their clients around these dangers. A skilled coyote will know the movements of the border patrol and when and how it is best for a person to sneak across. Some may try instead of getting over a border wall to slip past the patrol by pretending to be a valid, inconspicuous traveller. A trick that many migrants use is to deceptively cross legally but stay and work illegally. One trick they may use is to obtain a BCC (Border Crossing Card) to enter the country by posing as a tourist or a person who is visiting family or friends in the country and then to illegally stay in the country and work. Through these methods they would work to hide their connections to employers and would use the services of coyotes to obtain information, a job and connections they are able to use in the country to continue to live without being deported.

=== Two different types of coyotes ===
In the group of people that work as coyotes there are two important subgroups that have been categorized, the interior and exterior coyotes. Both groups work to get migrants illegally into the United States, however, they do it in different ways and will take different types of people. Which group a migrant uses (if they do choose to use a coyote and don't go alone or with their own group), depends on many factors such as if they are familiar with what they need to do to get into the U.S. along with what connections they have to both people in the U.S. and with prospective coyotes. These two broad groups are called Interior and Exterior Coyotes.

Interior Coyotes: Usually known to the people they are taking and are more often used by people with less experience trying to cross the border or who lack strong ties to people in the U.S. Persons without connections to where they are going in America usually travel with interior coyotes because they tend to be people from their hometown or people that they otherwise have more of a connection to. This provides social capital for the coyote by being perceived as being more trustworthy due to being known in the area if not the prospective migrant personally. These connections also can help the migrants avoid being taken advantage of or being abandoned part way by an untrustworthy or inexperienced guide. These social bonds between the migrants and their guides help to provide increased safety for a dangerous and illegal undertaking for the travellers and bring customers for the coyotes.

Border Coyotes: Also called border business coyotes or exterior coyotes, they usually live near the border and will regularly take people across all year. Migrants with more experience trying to cross the border or who are traveling during busy times for crossings are more likely to travel with border coyotes. These guides due to living near the border will help people cross all year long as long as the customers are willing to pay their price and take the risk of traveling with them. Experienced border crossers will more often go to the border on their own and travel across with the help of a professional border coyote. Coyotes cross immigrants through many different borders, but the main border is Tijuana, the cities of San Ysidro and El Chaparral.

=== Migrant fees and coyote start-up costs ===
Because of anti-smuggling legislation, such as the Illegal Immigration Reform and Immigrant Responsibility Act (IIRIRA), hardened the civil and criminal penalties for alien smuggling and expanded the use of the IDENT database (fingerprint recording system), coyotes increased their fees to match the risk. According to experts such as sociologist Douglass Massey, coyotes gross more than $5 billion a year. Crossing fees can range from $1,500 to $2,500 in Mexico. Police note that on a "good day" large coyote organizations can transport 500 people into the United States. This suggests that on a "good day", larger enterprises can earn an average of $1 million, while "mom and pop" rings can earn $780,000 annually.

"Mom and pop" coyote businesses do not require exorbitant amounts of money to get started. It depends on the method of border crossing an individual or group chooses. Most require transportation, including automobiles and rowboats, while other more sophisticated and expensive options require cash to purchase documents, scanning and graphics equipment to forge said documents, and real estate in the form of safe-houses.

All coyotes need social capital "in the form of social connectedness to trustworthy collaborators willing to assume the risks of engaging in extra-legal conspiracies." The construction of a good reputation is also critical to the success of coyotes in an ever-growing competitive market. Reputations are defined by competency, trustworthiness and decent customer service. They are primarily achieved by word of mouth amongst migrant social networks. When considering a coyote, migrants prioritize the success rate of border-crossings, the treatment received during trips and, for female clients, the respect shown to their gender.

== Media portrayals and controversy ==
Generally, coyotes are seen in negative eyes and with many negative connotations. International media coverage tends to highlight stories of coyote human rights violations. The media has reported on stories that have added to negative perceptions of coyote:

- New York Times, 2002: Since Operation Gatekeeper began in 1994, increasing policing in major border cities has pushed migrants to the "most severe terrain, with the most extreme climates, winter and summer", raising the migrant death toll, between 1994 and 2002, to 2,000. Besides the harsh terrain, the article argues that "possibly hundreds of migrants have died because they have been abandoned by smugglers."
- Coyote's growing associations with drug cartels have added to their vilified character. U.S. Border Patrol spokesman Special Agent Joe Romero argues "the Mexican drug cartels have merged human smuggling with drug trafficking, forcing immigrants to act as ‘mules’ in transporting drugs as the price of passage."
- On May 14, 2003, Victoria, Texas, police authorities found the bodies of 17 people, including a seven-year-old boy, inside a trailer truck used to smuggle them into the United States. Later, the death toll reached 19, as two more victims died in the hospital. The tragedy makes it "among the largest losses of life in any immigrant smuggling incident." The trailer was packed with approximately 100 people, mostly migrants from Mexico, El Salvador and Guatemala. Health officials determined close quarters, combined with Texas' 100-degree temperatures, created a deathly environment prone to death from asphyxiation and heatstroke. Upon investigation, the trailer showed desperate signs of "the trapped people [trying] to punch holes through... so air could come in." Asa Hutchinson, of the Department of Homeland Security, remarked, "The grim discovery is a horrific reminder of the callous disregard smugglers have for their human cargo... These ruthless criminals, who put profit before people, will be prosecuted to the fullest extent of the law."
- In January 2005, the Mexican government published Guia del Migrante Mexicano, a "Guide for the Mexican Immigrant." The pamphlet, containing tips and warnings on the dangers of illegally crossing the U.S.–Mexico border, cautions migrants not to trust coyotes. It reads, "They may try to fool you with assurances that they will take you across in a few hours... This is not true! They can risk your life... If you decide to resort to 'coyotes' to cross the border, consider the following precautions: Do not let him out of your sight; remember that he is the only one who knows the terrain and, therefore, the only one who can lead you across."
- Police speculated that a coyote was responsible for the 2010 death of Arizona rancher Robert Krentz. The death induced great pressure on Arizona's state government and is thought to have contributed to the passage of Arizona SB1070 on April 19, 2010.

== Other cases ==
=== Coyotes and organized crime ===
In the 21st century, migrant-smuggling networks have increasingly operated in areas controlled by organized criminal groups. Research on the Mexico–U.S. border has found that these groups sometimes recruit smugglers, charge them fees to use their territory, or kidnap and extort migrants. However, not all smuggling networks are controlled by organized crime. Some coyotes continue to work independently or through local networks.

Recent law-enforcement cases have also shown that criminal groups linked to drug cartels are involved in smuggling migrant children. In 2025, U.S. and Mexican authorities targeted a smuggling network based in Ciudad Juárez. The group was accused of transporting children from Central America and, in some cases, kidnapping migrants and demanding money from their families.

== See also ==
- Illegal immigration in the United States
- Guatemalan Mexicans
