= Russell Pearce =

American law enforcement officer and politician (1947–2023)

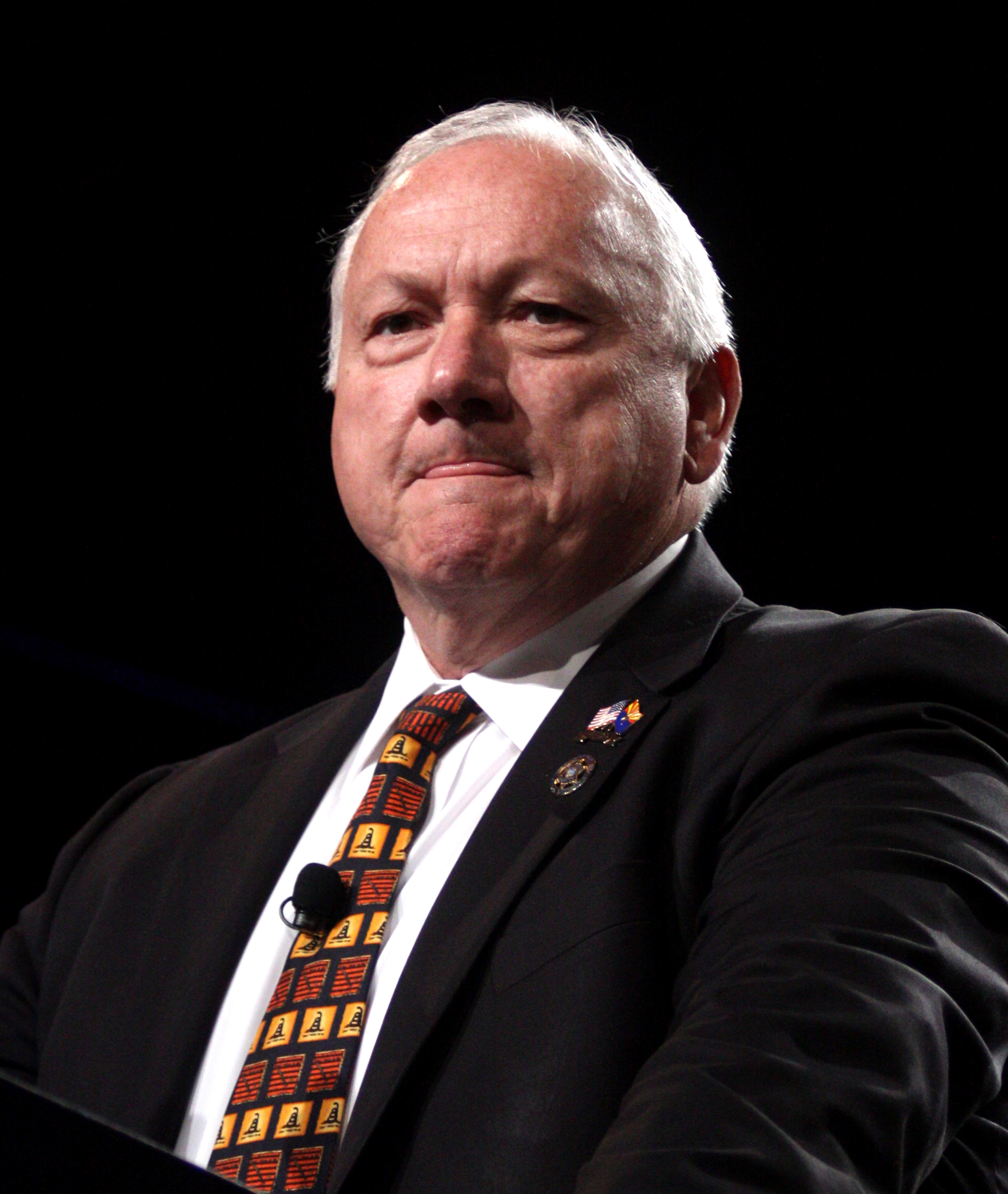
- Pearce in 2011

President of the Arizona State Senate
- In office January 10, 2011 – November 8, 2011
- Preceded by: Bob Burns
- Succeeded by: Steve Pierce

Member of the Arizona Senate from the 18th district
- In office January 12, 2008 – November 21, 2011
- Preceded by: Karen Johnson
- Succeeded by: Jerry Lewis

Personal details
- Born: Russell Keith Pearce; June 23, 1947 Mesa, Arizona, U.S.
- Died: January 5, 2023 (aged 75) Mesa, Arizona, U.S.
- Party: Republican
- Spouse: LuAnne Pearce
- Children: 5
- Education: University of Phoenix (BA)
- Website: Official website

Military service
- Branch/service: United States Army
- Years of service: 1965–1972
- Unit: Arizona National Guard

Russell Keith Pearce (June 23, 1947 – January 5, 2023) was an American politician who was a Republican (GOP) member of the Arizona State Senate. He rose to national prominence as the primary sponsor of Arizona SB1070, a controversial anti-illegal immigrant measure that was signed into law in 2010. He was elected President of the Arizona Senate when the Senate began its January 2011 term but then suffered a dramatic reversal of fortune when he was ousted in a November 2011 recall election, the first legislator in Arizona history to be so removed from office. He served as Vice-Chair of the Arizona GOP, but he resigned the position in September 2014 after controversy over a eugenicist comment about forced sterilization of poor women on Medicaid. His politics were widely described as far-right.

Prior to his election to the Arizona Senate in 2008, Pearce served in the Arizona House of Representatives from 2001 to 2009, and worked in law enforcement for more than twenty years.

== Education ==
- BA in Management at the University of Phoenix
- John F. Kennedy School of Government, Harvard University
- Motor Vehicle Legal and Law College, University of Colorado
- Advanced Executive Development, Arizona State University
- Budget and Appropriations, University of Arizona
- Arizona Judicial College, Supreme Court of Arizona

== History ==
A fifth-generation Arizonan, Pearce was born on June 23, 1947, to Hal Frost Pearce and Norma Crandell. He grew up in a troubled and impoverished home with an alcoholic father; he recalled in past interviews that when he came home from school, he sometimes found that neighbors had left groceries for the family, but his mother would always put the food to the side, not wishing to accept charity. Pearce served with the National Guard in Arizona during the Vietnam War.

=== Sheriff ===
Pearce wanted to attend medical school, but his family was unable to afford it, which led him to join the Maricopa County Sheriff's Office where he served as a sheriff's deputy for twenty-three years, including a stint as Chief Deputy Sheriff under Joe Arpaio. After an incident where he continued to pursue several gang members after being shot in the chest, he received a Medal of Valor from the Department. Pearce's son, Sean Pearce, has also been awarded the Medal of Valor for being shot in the line of duty while serving a homicide warrant.

Pearce claims credit for one of Arpaio's more publicized and controversial actions, that of housing jail inmates in tents. Following disagreements with Arpaio, Pearce moved to the Arizona Motor Vehicle Division.

In 1995, Pearce became the Director of the Arizona Motor Vehicle Division. Two notable changes during his tenure were: 1) bringing in IBM to create the first version of servicearizona.com, an online resource for Arizonans to update their Motor Vehicle Department information and 2) more controversially, Pearce enrolled Arizona in the then optional (at the federal level) National Drivers Registry program, making collection of social security numbers for drivers' licenses mandatory at the state level to comply with the (then optional) federal program. This caused a controversy at the time because he caused SSNs to be displayed on the face of the driver's license, causing the state legislature to have to later take up legislation to obfuscate the SSN, replacing it with a "D"# which is seen today. However, the SSN is still collected at the time of application or via SSOLV, and remains on the Arizona drivers license file. Pearce oversaw the implementation of a law requiring that applicants for drivers licenses provide either a birth certificate proving they are United States citizens, or documents proving they are in the United States legally.

Pearce was discharged from the position of Director of the Arizona Motor Vehicle Division in August 1999 by Arizona Department of Transportation Director Mary Peters, after an investigation revealed that two of Pearce's subordinates had tampered with a Tucson woman's driving record. Pearce later said he was cleared of wrongdoing, but Peters told the Arizona Republic: "There's a big difference between being cleared and choosing not to file criminal charges".

He was elected to the Arizona House in 2000, representing a district in the Mesa area. He transferred to the state senate in 2006. During his tenure, Pearce authored legislation creating the Arizona Auto Theft Authority and served as its chairman. The Arizona Auto Theft Authority has been credited with a 60% decrease in statewide car thefts since its inception in 1992.

Republican anti-tax activist Grover Norquist's group, Americans for Tax Reform, named Pearce a "Hero of the Taxpayers" for 2003.

== Immigration policies ==
In 2004, Pearce supported Arizona's Proposition 200, which requires individuals to produce proof of citizenship before they may register to vote or apply for public benefits in Arizona. Prop 200 was approved by voters as a ballot initiative in 2004. Proof of citizenship includes an Arizona drivers license issued on or after October 1, 1996, the date from which AZ DLs were required to contain SSNs on the DL data file.

Pearce was the lead sponsor of Arizona SB1070, drafted by Kansas anti-immigrant politician Kris Kobach which passed into law in April 2010 as the Support Our Law Enforcement and Safe Neighborhoods Act. The measure attracted national attention as the broadest and strictest anti-illegal immigration measure in decades within the United States. After the Obama administration challenged the law, resulting in a federal court ruling that most of the law was unconstitutional, Pearce told a gathering of conservative activists, "When you talk about jihad, that is exactly what Obama has against America, specifically the state of Arizona."

In a 2008 story on National Public Radio NPR, he was quoted as saying, "I believe in the rule of law ... I've always believed in the rule of law. We're a nation of laws."; and "I will not back off until we solve the problem of this illegal invasion. Invaders, that's what they are. Invaders on the American sovereignty and it can't be tolerated." In reaction to the federal government's seeking of an injunction against enforcement of the law on constitutional grounds: "It's outrageous and it's clear they don't want (immigration) laws enforced. What they want is to continue their non-enforcement policy," Pearce said. "They ignore the damage to America, the cost to our citizens, the deaths" tied to border-related violence.

He also sponsored Arizona SB1097, also debated in the legislature during the 2010 term, which sought to quantify the impact of illegal immigration on the state's K-12 education system. The text of the bill states that:

- School districts would be required to identify and count all students who are in the U.S. illegally.
- The state's Department of Education would be required to report annually on the impact and costs to state taxpayers of the enrollment of these students.
- The state Superintendent of Public Instruction would be authorized to withhold state aid from districts that do not comply with the law.

CNN announced on June 15, 2010, that Senator Pearce was proposing a measure that would deny U.S. citizenship to children born in this country to illegal immigrants in an effort to thwart so-called "anchor babies". The vast majority of legal scholars have stated that such a measure would be unconstitutional as the 14th Amendment guarantees citizenship to anyone born in the United States.

The endorsement of the Utah Compact by Pearce's church, The Church of Jesus Christ of Latter-day Saints (LDS Church), resulted in accusations that Pearce opposed the social stance held by his own church on illegal immigration. Pearce addressed these accusations by reaffirming that he supports the principles in the Utah Compact such as the importance of the family and showing respect to immigrants. However he disagrees with what he considers to be a deceitful purpose of the Utah Compact being used as a political vehicle for pro-amnesty activists. He disagrees with the compact's failure to differentiate between legal and illegal immigration. The church's adoption of compassion-based approaches to immigration issues has sharply divided Mormons, with an increasing number being opposed to Pearce's immigration platform and desiring a solution more resembling the Compact.

== Controversies ==
Pearce faced criticism in 2006 after he called for the renewal of a 1950s immigration enforcement program, Operation Wetback, that deported or encouraged to self-deport 1.3 million illegal immigrants (and several hundred US citizens) in less than a year. Hispanic groups said the use of the word wetback was derogatory.

In October 2006, Pearce included the text of an article by National Alliance, a white separatist group, in an email to a group of supporters. The article, titled "Who Rules America" contained allegations of Jewish control of the media and of multiculturalism being a Jewish anti-White conspiracy, as well as Holocaust denialism. He quickly apologized to supporters in an email, stating: "Ugly the words contained in it really are. They are not mine and I disavow them completely. Worse still, the website links to a group whose politics are the ugliest imaginable." Pearce told reporters he did not agree with the antisemitic and racist statements in the article, and that he had copied it from an email forwarded to him by someone else after "the title and the first paragraphs about media bias appealed to him".

Pearce was also criticized for his association with the homicidal white supremacist J. T. Ready. Pearce endorsed Ready for Mesa City Council in 2006 and appeared with him at several rallies. In 2004 Pearce was photographed attending Ready's baptism into the LDS Church. In addition, church documents revealed that Pearce ordained Ready into the LDS priesthood in 2004. Pearce has since claimed he was unaware of Ready's neo-Nazi affiliations at the time he made the endorsement.

In April 2008, Pearce sponsored a measure, Senate Bill 1108, that would bar Arizonan public schools from teachings that "denigrate[s] American values and the teachings of Western civilization", and prohibit the formation of groups "based in whole or part on the race of their membership". Pearce said he didn't want students indoctrinated with anti-American ideologies. The Arizona Republic noted the measure could ban groups such as the Black Business Students Association at Arizona State University or Native Americans United at Northern Arizona University. Critics of the bill called it vague and predicted its implementation would have chilling effects.

As lead sponsor of Arizona SB 1070, Pearce received assistance from the Federation for American Immigration Reform (FAIR) in drafting the text for the legislation. In December 2007, FAIR was identified as a "hate group" by the Southern Poverty Law Center (SPLC). Founded In the early 1990s by eugenicist John Tanton, FAIR received funding from the Pioneer Fund, a eugenics society established in 1937 "to advance the scientific study of heredity and human differences" that the SPLC has described as a neo-Nazi organization.

In October 2010, the SB 1070 bill, which Pearce sponsored in the legislature, came under criticism for benefiting the for-profit prison industry. Most of the language of the bill had been written as model legislation at a December 2009 meeting of the Koch-sponsored American Legislative Exchange Council (ALEC), where Pearce was joined as an attendee by officials of the company Corrections Corporation of America (CCA), later renamed CoreCivic. CCA "executives believe immigrant detention is their next big market" according to NPR.

In November 2010, Pearce launched a push to reject US$7 billion in federal funding for Arizona's Medicaid program, which serves more than one million people. When asked what those who rely upon this program for health care would do if it no longer has the funds to operate, Pearce said "they'll probably be okay."

== 2011 recall election ==
On May 31, 2011, Citizens for a Better Arizona turned in 18,315 signatures to the Arizona Secretary of State's Office to recall Pearce from office. On July 8, the Arizona Secretary of State's Office officially verified that the recall petitions had sufficient signatures. On July 12, Arizona Governor Jan Brewer (R) issued an order calling a special recall election in November. Pearce was the first state lawmaker in Arizona history to be recalled.

Mesa, Arizona, Republican Jerry Lewis announced he would run against Senator Pearce. Independent Tommy Cattey also filed to become a candidate in the recall election. A significant factor in Pearce's recall was that his views on immigration and other matters are an embarrassment to the Church of Jesus Christ of Latter-day Saints, of which Pearce was a member, which led Jerry Lewis, another member of the church, to seek to replace him.

=== Straw candidate ===
Pearce, Pearce’s brother, Lester, top GOP strategists Chuck Coughlin and Doug Cole, with other Tea Party supporters, selected and supported Tea Party Republican Olivia Cortes to run in the recall election, as a straw or decoy candidate in order to split the anti-Pearce Republican vote. She was accused by Republican Mary Lou Boettcher of having no election committee, no volunteers, and was being supported and funded almost entirely by friends of Pearce, who had gathered enough signatures to place her on the ballot.

Cortes was challenged in court as not being a legitimate candidate and she was removed from the race. However, her name remained on the ballot, which may have siphoned away votes from Lewis. Several members of Pearce's campaign effort were accused of Class 5 felonies for their role in aiding and funding the sham candidacy. Cortes later dropped out of the race.

=== Robocalls ===
On November 7, 2011, the night before his recall election, Mesa voters were flooded with robocalls from Pearce's supporters, informing them that both Pearce and his challenger Jerry Lewis were Republicans. The call then encouraged voters to protest this one-sided election by writing in their own candidate. Since the winner of an Arizona recall election is the candidate who receives a plurality of the votes cast, and the candidate whose recall is sought is also on the ballot, the effect of casting such a write-in vote is to decrease the chance that a single challenger will receive more votes than the candidate whose recall is sought.

On November 8, 2011, Pearce was defeated in the recall election by Lewis. Lewis said, "We now have an opportunity to heal the divide in Mesa." Pearce replied, "If being recalled is the price for keeping one's promises, then so be it."

== 2012 Senate primary defeat ==
On August 28, 2012, Pearce lost his comeback bid in the Republican primary for the nomination for a state senate seat to businessman Bob Worsley, by 56 to 44 percent.

== 2014 party leadership resignation ==
In September 2014, Pearce made eugenicist comments on his KKNT radio show, stating that poor, unemployed women on Medicaid should receive forced sterilization, as well as other comments which were widely criticized in the media and by fellow GOP politicians. As a result of the controversy, he resigned his position as Vice-Chair of the Arizona GOP.

== Personal life and death ==
Pearce lived in Mesa, Arizona with his wife, LuAnne and his three adopted grandchildren: Wyatt, Ethan, and Tatum Pearce. He has five children: Dodi, Sean, Colten, Justin, and Joshua. Pearce has worked in the Maricopa County Treasurer's Office since 2014.

In 1980, LuAnne Pearce filed a petition for dissolution of marriage which alleged that he "is possessed of a violent temper, and has from time to time hit and shoved the wife, when he grabbed the wife by the throat and threw her down." LuAnne was later reconciled with her husband. When asked many years later about the allegations, she acknowledged the 1980 petition but, despite having signed the document under oath, categorically denied ever having been struck, grabbed by the throat, thrown down, or threatened by her husband, adding that she did not know how the allegations came to be part of the court document signed by her under oath. Her husband likewise denied the allegations.

Pearce's son Justin resigned from the Arizona Motor Vehicles Division in 1999, after he produced counterfeit driver's licenses for himself and four friends with false ages in an effort to avoid alcohol prohibition laws. Justin Pearce subsequently pleaded guilty to tampering with a public record and received a suspended sentence.

In February 2011, Mesa police arrested Pearce's son, Joshua Trent Pearce, on two outstanding arrest warrants tied to a probation violation and failing to appear in court.

Pearce's nephew Talmage attended the 2016 Republican Convention as an anti-Trump delegate from Arizona's 5th District.

Pearce died at his home in Mesa on January 5, 2023, at the age of 75.
