= Illegal immigration to Mississippi =

Illegal immigration to Mississippi became a public issue when, in the early weeks of January 2011, both houses began debating an illegal immigration bill modeled after the Arizona SB 1070. Leaders in the black community and religious groups have come out against the proposed legislation, citing its inherent racism and intolerance, but others proclaim the bill as necessary in their fight to stop illegal immigration into the state.

== Background ==
According to a 2008 Census survey, only 2.1 percent of Mississippi’s population was born outside of the country. 51 percent of the foreign-born population entered the state either in or after the year 2000.

A February 2006 report from the Mississippi State Auditor found it challenging to accurately quantify the state costs of illegal immigration because of the inadequacy of records from state agencies, schools, and other government entities. Despite this challenge, the report estimates the state cost of illegal immigrants in 2006 to be about $25 million per year. This cost takes into account any potential financial contributions of the illegal immigrants, including sales tax. Though the number of estimated illegal immigrants ranged from 8,000 to 90,000, this study is based on the midpoint of that range, 49,000. Thus, this study found the state cost per illegal immigrant in Mississippi to be $510.

== History ==
A 2008 American Prospect article states the source of immigration for Mississippi is the casino industry. The article asserts that when Mississippi passed a law permitting casino gambling in 1991, immigrant workers from came from Florida to build the casinos. After the casinos were built, the casinos continued to use the immigrant workers to fill their growing labor needs. Since the casino business continued to boom through the 1990s, migrant workers continued to flock to Mississippi in hopes of finding job opportunities.

Both houses of the legislature passed bills on illegal immigration, but the bills differed greatly. The Mississippi Senate voted against the House's version of the immigration bill in early February, 2011, but moved to continue negotiations of the bill among the chambers in a conference committee. The committee couldn't reach an agreement and the bill died at the conference. Both the House and Senate versions of the bill say that a law enforcement agent has the right to ask for proof of residency during a routine traffic stop if the officer has a reasonably suspicion that the person is in the country illegally. One of the main differences between the two bills is the House calls for a steep fine for businesses that hire illegal aliens.

Politicians and citizens find themselves divided on the issue of illegal immigration in Mississippi. Complaints are raised about the hurried nature of the bill's passage and that it could lead to increased racial profiling since officers would have to determine based on someone's physical identity whether they needed to provide proof of residency. Several religious leaders from different faiths have also expressed opposition to the legislation, saying that Jesus accepts all people, not just ones with immigration papers.

== Legislation in other states ==
Mississippi is not alone in deciding to tackle immigration from the state level. In 2007, all 50 states proposed legislation dealing with illegal immigration. The number of bills focusing on illegal immigration went from 570 in 2006 to 1,562 in 2007. 240 of these bills were enacted. As of December 31, 2010, six states had proposed illegal immigration bills similar to those of Arizona, including Mississippi.

== See also ==
- Mississippi SB 2179
- Immigration reform in the United States
