= Mississippi SB 2179 =

Bill on illegal immigration

Mississippi SB 2179 was a bill regarding illegal immigration in Mississippi. Largely similar to Arizona SB 1070, this bill also makes it a state misdemeanor crime for an alien to be in Mississippi without carrying the required documents, bars state or local officials or agencies from restricting enforcement of federal immigration laws, and cracks down on those sheltering, hiring and transporting illegal aliens. Like Arizona SB 1070, the paragraph on intent in the legislation says it embodies an "attrition through enforcement" doctrine. The difference between this law and Arizona's is that immigration status must be determined at any lawful stop, detention or arrest made by a law enforcement official or a law enforcement agency where reasonable suspicion exists that the person is an alien and is unlawfully present in the United States.

The bill was passed by the Mississippi Senate, 34-15, and the amended version passed the Mississippi House, 80-36. Because the two chambers must pass the same version of the bill to become a law, a conference committee (a small group of members from both chambers) was created to compromise. However, the committee did not produce a final agreement, and the bill died at the conference.

== See also ==
- Illegal immigration to Mississippi
- Arizona SB 1070
- Alabama HB 56
- Special Order 40
- Texas Senate Bill 4
- Utah Compact
