= Border Governors Conference =

The Border Governors Conference is an annual, bi-national meeting between the governors of the four American states and six Mexican states that form the Mexico – United States border. It has been held since 1980.

== Structure ==
The conference is attended by:

- the Governor of California, Governor of Arizona, Governor of New Mexico, and Governor of Texas, and
- the Governor of Baja California, Governor of Sonora, Governor of Chihuahua, Governor of Coahuila, Governor of Nuevo León, and Governor of Tamaulipas.

The conferences typically last from two to three days. The conference's location changes among the member states each year, and often alternates between the U.S. and Mexico.

The conference provides a forum for state- and regional-level concerns, issues, and opportunities to be discussed by those in executive charge of the border regions. Results of the policy coordination efforts of the body are often announced via joint declarations at the close of conferences. No permanent office or staff belongs to the conference itself. The conference was attended by as many as 1,200 people until 1994, but was scaled back in size in subsequent years to somewhat over 100 people, in order to permit the governors better opportunities for personal interaction and substantive discussions. Its importance is still uncertain, however, as it is sometimes seen as more about publicity and conversation than accomplishing tangible results.

== History ==
The first conference was held in Nuevo Casas Grandes, Chihuahua, in 1980. The conference in 2009 was the 27th such meeting; the conference planned for 1985 failed to instantiate, no conferences were held in 1986 and 1988, and in 1995 the Mexican governors held their own conference due to a lack of U.S. representation.

From the beginning, the Border Governors Conference has discussed the hottest issues affecting the border, such as immigration and trade. The 1981 conference in El Paso, Texas, reached an impasse over whether to support U.S. President Ronald Reagan's proposed immigration reforms, which would grant amnesty to illegal aliens but require a 90 percent reduction in the number of undocumented Mexican workers entering the U.S. each year. The conference unanimously endorsed the North American Free Trade Agreement in 1993, but not before some 200 demonstrators protested outside the Monterrey, Nuevo León, for better living conditions. In favor of comprehensive immigration reform the conference was in their joint communique after the 2007 meeting.

A flurry of activity related to the conference took place in 2010, due to the passage of the Arizona SB 1070 anti-illegal immigration law. It was scheduled to be held in Phoenix, Arizona, in September 2010 and be hosted by Arizona Governor Jan Brewer. The governors of the six Mexican states belonging to the conference vowed to boycott it in protest of the law, saying SB 1070 is "based on ethnic and cultural prejudice contrary to fundamental rights," and Brewer said in response that she was canceling the gathering. Governors Bill Richardson of New Mexico and Arnold Schwarzenegger of California, both U.S. border governors who oppose the law, will co-host an "interim meeting" of the conference in Santa Fe, New Mexico, instead. In the following year of 2011, three of the four U.S. governors failed to appear in Ensenada, Baja California, for the conference, claiming scheduling conflicts, risking of a diminishment of the conference's importance.
