= Arizona v. United States =

Supreme Court case on Arizona immigration law

- Supreme Court of the United States

Argued April 25, 2012 Decided June 25, 2012
- Full case name: Arizona, et al., Petitioners v. United States
- Docket no.: 11-182
- Citations: 567 U.S. 387 (more) 132 S. Ct. 2492; 183 L. Ed. 2d 351
- Argument: Oral argument
- Opinion announcement: Opinion announcement

Case history
- Prior: Injunction against Arizona, 703 F. Supp. 2d 980 (D. Ariz. 2010); affirmed and remanded, 641 F.3d 339 (9th Cir. 2011); cert. granted, 565 U.S. 1092 (2011).

Holding
- An Arizona law providing authority for local law enforcement to enforce immigration law violated the enumerated powers of Congress and is preempted by federal statute. Arizona law enforcement may inquire about a resident's legal status during lawful encounters, but may not implement its own immigration rules.

Court membership
- Chief Justice John Roberts Associate Justices Antonin Scalia · Anthony Kennedy; Clarence Thomas · Ruth Bader Ginsburg; Stephen Breyer · Samuel Alito; Sonia Sotomayor · Elena Kagan

Case opinions
- Majority: Kennedy, joined by Roberts, Ginsburg, Breyer, Sotomayor
- Concur/dissent: Scalia
- Concur/dissent: Thomas
- Concur/dissent: Alito
- Kagan took no part in the consideration or decision of the case.

Laws applied
- U.S. Const. art. I, § 8, cl. 4, U.S. Const. art. VI, cl. 2; Arizona SB 1070

Arizona v. United States, 567 U.S. 387 (2012), was a United States Supreme Court case involving Arizona's SB 1070, a state law intended to increase the powers of local law enforcement that wished to enforce federal immigration laws. The issue is whether the law usurps the federal government's authority to regulate immigration laws and enforcement. The court ruled that sections 3, 5(C), and 6 of S. B. 1070 were preempted by federal law but left other parts of the law intact, including a provision that allowed law enforcement to investigate a person's immigration status.

== Background ==
On April 23, 2010, Arizona governor Jan Brewer signed into law SB 1070, which supporters dubbed the "Support Our Law Enforcement and Safe Neighborhoods Act". It made it a state misdemeanor for an illegal immigrant to be in Arizona without carrying registration documents required by federal law; authorized state and local law enforcement of federal immigration laws; and penalized those found to be knowingly sheltering, hiring, and transporting illegal immigrants.

The bill's passage immediately sparked constitutional concerns over potential civil rights violations and encouraging of racial profiling. Tens of thousands of people demonstrated against the law in over 70 U.S. cities on May 1, 2010 (International Workers' Day). A rally in Los Angeles, attended by Cardinal Roger Mahony of the Roman Catholic Church, attracted between 50,000 and 60,000 people, with protesters waving Mexican flags and chanting "Sí se puede." The city had become the national center of protests against the Arizona law. Around 25,000 people were at a protest in Dallas, and more than 5,000 were in Chicago and Milwaukee. Rallies in other cities generally attracted around 1,000 people or so. There and in some other locations, demonstrators expressed frustration with what they saw as the administration's lack of action on immigration reform, with signs holding messages such as "Hey Obama! Don't deport my mama."

The case was filed by the United States Justice Department in the United States District Court for the District of Arizona on July 6, 2010, challenging Arizona SB 1070 as usurping the federal government's authority to regulate immigration laws and enforcement. The plaintiffs also referenced the notion of federal preemption and stated, "The Constitution and the federal immigration laws do not permit the development of a patchwork of state and local immigration policies throughout the country." Additionally, the Justice Department, in its July 6, 2010, motion, requested for the federal courts to issue an injunction to enjoin enforcement of the law before it went into effect. Arizona responded to the motion. The 1976 precedent of De Canas v. Bica was relied upon in Arizona's Motion.

On Wednesday, July 28, 2010, Judge Susan R. Bolton blocked key portions of SB 1070 including "requiring police to check the immigration status of those they arrest or whom they stop and suspect are in the country undocumented would overwhelm the federal government's ability to respond, and could mean legal immigrants are wrongly arrested." Judge Bolton wrote in her ruling:

Federal resources will be taxed and diverted from federal enforcement priorities as a result of the increase in requests for immigration status determination that will flow from Arizona

Governor Brewer promised to appeal the ruling by calling it "a temporary bump in the road."

Several states jointly filed a Proposed Brief of Amici Curiae. The brief supported Arizona. The States of Michigan, Florida, Alabama, Nebraska, Pennsylvania, South Carolina, South Dakota, Texas, and Virginia, along with the Commonwealth of the Northern Mariana Islands, filed their proposed brief on July 14, 2010. The brief stated that it "defends the States' authority to concurrently enforce federal immigration laws, especially in light of the selective and even lack of enforcement of those laws by the Obama administration. Under the current situation, the States have lost control over their borders and are left to guess at the reality of the law." The Latin American countries of Argentina, Bolivia, Chile, Colombia, Costa Rica, El Salvador, Guatemala, Mexico, Nicaragua, Paraguay, and Peru filed an amicus brief in support of the United States.

A group of 81 members of the United States Congress also filed a Proposed Brief of Amici Curiae. The brief supported Arizona.

On July 28, 2010, Judge Bolton issued an order denying in part and granting in part the United States' Motion for Preliminary Injunction heard the prior week.

Among the provisions that would go into effect are the following: A.R.S. § 11-1051(A): prohibiting Arizona officials, agencies, and political subdivisions from limiting enforcement of federal immigration laws; A.R.S. § 11-1051(C)-(F): requiring state officials to work with federal officials with regard to undocumented immigrants; and, A.R.S. § 11-1051(G)-(L): allowing legal residents to sue any state official, agency, or political subdivision for adopting a policy of restricting enforcement of federal immigration laws to less than the full extent permitted by federal law. See July 28, 2010, Order

An appeal of the US District Court's July 28, 2010, ruling was filed on July 29, 2010. A motion to expedite the normal appeal schedule was also filed. Arizona gave the following reasons for the motion to expedite:

Good cause exists to expedite this appeal under Ninth Circuit Rules 27-12 and 34-3 and 28 U.S.C. § 1657 because it is an appeal of a preliminary injunction enjoining several key provisions of SB 1070 that the Arizona Legislature determined were critical to address serious criminal, environmental, and economic problems Arizona has been suffering as a consequence of undocumented immigration and the lack of effective enforcement activity by the federal government. An expedited briefing schedule will not unreasonably burden the parties because it is consistent with the expedited briefing schedule Plaintiff-Appellee received for the initial ruling on its Motion for Preliminary Injunction, the issues on appeal are narrower than those the district court addressed and have largely been briefed by the parties, and the parties are well represented with sufficient counsel to brief the issues under the schedule Defendants-Appellants have proposed.

Governor Brewer requested the following appeal schedule: opening brief due August 12, 2010, response brief due August 26, 2010, reply brief due September 2, 2010, and oral argument during week of September 13, basically a 30-day schedule, almost twice the schedule allowed for the original motion for preliminary injunction.

On July 30, 2010, the Appeals Court ordered the following appeal schedule:

- opening brief due August 26, 2010
- response brief due September 23, 2010
- reply brief due 14 days after response
- oral argument (hearing) during first week of November 2010

=== Ninth Circuit opinion and way to Supreme Court decision ===
Recording of oral arguments heard by Ninth Circuit.

On November 1, 2010, the U.S. Court of Appeals for the Ninth Circuit heard arguments in the case. The three-judge panel was composed of Judges Richard Paez, Carlos Bea, and John T. Noonan. On April 11, 2011, the Ninth Circuit panel upheld the district court's ban on parts of the law taking effect, thus ruling in favor of the Obama administration and against Arizona. Judge Richard Paez gave the majority opinion in which Judge John T. Noonan, Jr. joined, and Judge Carlos Bea dissented in part. Paez agreed with the administration's view that the state had intruded upon federal prerogatives. Noonan wrote in his concurrence: "The Arizona statute before us has become a symbol. For those sympathetic to immigrants to the United States, it is a challenge and a chilling foretaste of what other states might attempt."

On May 9, 2011, Governor Brewer announced that Arizona would appeal directly to the U.S. Supreme Court, rather than request a hearing en banc before the Ninth Circuit; the appeal was filed on August 10, 2011. In response, the Justice Department requested the Supreme Court to stay out of the case by saying that the lower courts actions were appropriate. Observers thought it likely that the Supreme Court would take up the matter, but if it declined to step in, the case most likely would be returned to the trial judge in the District Court to review the case on its merits and determine whether the temporary injunction that blocked the law's most controversial provisions should become permanent. The Supreme Court announced in December 2011 that it would review Arizona's Support Our Law Enforcement and Safe Neighborhoods Act, and oral arguments took place on April 25, 2012.

== Supreme Court decision ==
On December 12, 2011, the United States Supreme Court granted certiorari to hear the case. The court heard oral arguments for the case on April 25, 2012. Justice Elena Kagan recused herself from the case, presumably because during her time as the United States Solicitor General under the Obama administration she had defended the federal government's position in the case.

On June 25, 2012, the court struck down three of the four provisions of SB 1070. The majority opinion was written by Justice Kennedy and was joined by Chief Justice Roberts, Justice Ginsburg, Justice Breyer, and Justice Sotomayor. Justices Scalia, Thomas, and Alito all concurred in part and dissented in part in separate opinions that were joined by no other justice.

Justice Kennedy's majority opinion held that Sections 3, 5(C), and 6 were preempted by federal law. The three provisions struck down required legal immigrants to carry registration documents at all times, allowed state police to arrest any individual suspected of being an illegal immigrant, and made it a crime for an illegal immigrant to search for or hold a job in the state.

All justices agreed to uphold the provision of the law allowing Arizona state police to investigate the immigration status of an individual stopped, detained, or arrested if they have reasonable suspicion that the individual is in the country illegally. However, Justice Kennedy specified in the majority opinion that state police may not detain the individual for a prolonged amount of time for not carrying immigration documents, and that cases of racial profiling may proceed through the courts if such cases arise.

=== Majority opinion ===
Justice Kennedy's majority opinion identified the question before the court as "whether federal law preempts and renders invalid four separate provisions of the state law." The four provisions in question were:

1. Section 3 of S.B. 1070, which made it a state crime to be unlawfully present in the United States and failing to register with the federal government;
2. Section 5, which made it a misdemeanor state crime to seek work or to work without authorization to do so;
3. Section 2, which in some circumstances required Arizona state and local officers to verify the citizenship or alien status of people arrested, stopped, or detained; and
4. Section 6, which authorized warrantless arrests of aliens believed to be removable from the United States based on probable cause.

Kennedy's opinion embraced an expansive view of the United States Government's authority to regulate immigration and aliens, describing it as "broad" and "undoubted". That authority derived from the legislative power of Congress to "establish an uniform Rule of Naturalization", enumerated in the Constitution, as well as the longstanding interpretation of federal sovereignty in areas pertaining to the control and conduct of relations with foreign nations. In this context, federal discretion as to whether or how immigration laws are enforced is an important component of Congressional authority. At the same time, Justice Kennedy's opinion acknowledged the serious concerns experienced by Arizona citizens and officials in dealing with illegal immigration, noting that signs along highways south of Phoenix, Arizona, discourage travel by the public because of dangerous smuggling activities.

The majority opinion analyzed the four provisions in question within the framework of preemption, derived from the Supremacy Clause, requiring federal law to prevail when state and federal laws conflict. The Ccurt held that "the Federal Government has occupied the field of alien registration" and so all state action and "even complementary state regulation is impermissible." Therefore, the registration provisions of Section 3 were preempted by federal law. In contrast to Section 3, the criminal provisions of Section 5 had no direct counterpart under federal law, which led the court to apply the "ordinary principles of preemption" rather than the doctrine of field preemption. Under those principles, Section 5 stood as an obstacle to the objectives of Congress of not imposing "criminal penalties on aliens who seek or engage in unauthorized employment". Therefore, Section 5 was also preempted by federal law.

Section 6 of SB 1070 was also found to be preempted by federal law on the basis that it created an "obstacle to the full purposes and objectives of Congress". The court noted that it is not generally a crime for a removable alien to be present in the United States and that Section 6 would give state officers "even greater authority to arrest aliens on the basis of possible removability than Congress has given to trained federal immigration officers." Furthermore, the removal process is "entrusted to the discretion of the Federal Government."

The majority upheld Section 2 but did so by reading it in a more restrictive manner. The provisions at issue required Arizona officers to make a "reasonable attempt" to determine the immigration status of any person stopped, detained, or arrested on a legitimate basis if "reasonable suspicion" existed that the person is an alien and is unlawfully present in the United States. Additionally, any arrestee's immigration status would have to have been determined before they could be released. Status checks would have been made through Immigration and Customs Enforcement and their databases. Listing several examples, Justice Kennedy wrote that Section 2(B) "likely would survive preemption" if it is interpreted to require only state officers to conduct a status check "during the course of an authorized, lawful detention or after a detainee has been released." Underlining the cautious approach that the majority took to Section 2(B) were Justice Kennedy's final words on the section: "This opinion does not foreclose other preemption and constitutional challenges to the law as interpreted and applied after it goes into effect."

=== Dissents ===
Justice Scalia dissented, and said that he would have upheld all four provisions as a valid exercise of concurrent state sovereignty over immigration. He argued that the statute was valid: "As a sovereign, Arizona has the inherent power to exclude persons from its territory, subject only to those limitations expressed in the Constitution or constitutionally imposed by Congress. That power to exclude has long been recognized as inherent in sovereignty." To support his position, Justice Scalia reviewed several cases from the early history of the Supreme Court's Immigration jurisprudence.

Justice Thomas likewise would have upheld the entire law as not preempted by federal law, but for different reasons. He concluded that none of the challenged sections presented an actual conflict with federal law, and so the preemption doctrine did not apply.

Justice Alito agreed with Justices Scalia and Thomas regarding Sections 5(C) and 6 but joined with the majority in finding Section 3 preempted and that Section 2(B) was not preempted. With respect to Section 5(C) Justice Alito argued that "[t]he Court's holding on §5(C) is inconsistent with De Canas v. Bica, 424 U. S. 351 (1976), which held that employment regulation, even of aliens unlawfully present in the country, is an area of traditional state concern." He also argued that Section 6 was not preempted because "[l]ike §2(B), §6 adds virtually nothing to the authority that Arizona law enforcement officers already exercise. And whatever little authority they have gained is consistent with federal law."

== Role of Justice Kagan's recusal ==
In an article on SCOTUSblog, Stephen Wermiel mentions that Justice Kagan's recusal may have played a role in the 5–3 outcome of the case. Some commentators were surprised by the Chief Justice's vote, and thought that the Chief may have voted with the majority to prevent the case from ending in a 4–4 deadlock.

== Legacy ==
Shortly after retiring as Solicitor General of the United States, Donald B. Verrilli, Jr. said in a 2016 interview that it was a high-profile case in 2012, but its consequences were not fully appreciated. In his view, the problem was not so much the "show me your papers" provision of the law at issue "but that the states are trying to supplant the federal government's role in setting immigration policy, and we can't have fifty different immigration policies." After the Supreme Court ruled on the case, its decision helped to deter other states from establishing and enforcing their own immigration policies. Verrilli concluded that the court had made "a very consequential decision" which meant that an incipient anti-immigrant movement "got stopped dead in its tracks".

The court's ruling said "As a general rule, it is not a crime for a removable alien to remain in the United States."

== See also ==
- Immigration to the United States
