= Robert N. Shelton =

American scientist and former university president

Robert N. Shelton (born 1948) is the president of Giant Magellan Telescope (GMTO), an organization behind the development of the 24.5 meter Giant Magellan Telescope (GMT) which is poised to be the world's largest astronomical telescope when it comes online early in the next decade.

Before joining GMTO, Shelton was the president of Research Corporation for Science Advancement, America's first foundation dedicated solely to funding science. In his earlier days, he also served as the executive director of the Arizona Sports Foundation, the 19th president of the University of Arizona, and provost and executive vice chancellor of the University of North Carolina at Chapel Hill, among many other leadership and academic positions at public research universities.

An expert in condensed matter physics, Shelton received his B.S. from Stanford University and his M.S. and Ph.D. from the University of California, San Diego.
