= Murder of Robert Krentz =

American rancher and murder victim (1915–2010)

Robert N. Krentz Jr. (1951 – March 27, 2010) was a prominent rancher in the U.S. state of Arizona. Active in a family cattle ranching business stretching back nearly 100 years, he and his family ranch were inducted into the Arizona Farming and Ranching Hall of Fame in 2008. Krentz was featured several times during the 1990s and 2000s (decade) in media reports regarding the problems surrounding illegal immigration across the Arizona stretch of the United States – Mexico border, particularly regarding its impact on ranching.

On March 27, 2010, Krentz was found shot dead on his Cochise County ranch property after reporting seeing an immigrant in need of help. In the immediate aftermath, local authorities said evidence indicated that the assailant was most likely an illegal immigrant, though subsequent investigation suggested the killing was not random and that drug smugglers may have been responsible. Krentz's killing attracted national attention and became a rallying cry for border security and immigration reform.

== Background ==
The Krentz ranch, located northeast of Douglas, Arizona, was founded by Julius and Emma Krentz (Rob Krentz's great-grandparents) in the 19th century when Arizona was still only a U.S. territory. Rob and his wife Susan, together with his brother Phil and sister-in-law Carrie, were the fourth generation of the family to live and work on the ranch. Rob had previously served as president of the Cochise-Graham Cattlegrowers Association, and was described as "a pillar of the Cochise County ranching community."

In 2008, the Krentz ranch and family were honored with induction into the Arizona Farming and Ranching Hall of Fame. Rob and Susan Krentz accepted the award on behalf of the family.

"By all accounts, Mr. Krentz never got caught up in border politics. A bear of a man with a reserved nature, he could seem imposing at first glance but almost always rendered help to those who needed it, friends and family said. He inherited the 35,000-acre ranch from his father — it has been in the family since 1907," said The New York Times.

== Illegal immigration ==
By the end of the 20th century, illegal immigration from Mexico into the U.S. across the Arizona-Sonora border had become a significant problem at the Krentz ranch. In a 2005 interview with local news affiliate KOLD, Rob Krentz stated that illegal immigration across his property had caused over $8 million in damages during a five-year period. In its 262-mile (422 km) "Tucson Sector", which includes the Krentz ranch, the border patrol reported making 241,673 arrests during 2009.

Krentz himself was described as non-confrontational toward the immigrants, but rather was often sympathetic, providing them with food and water, and calling the border patrol for those who needed medical assistance. In a 1999 interview with PBS, Krentz had stated, "If they come and ask for water, I'll still give them water. You know, that's just my nature."

== Murder ==
At approximately 10:30 on the morning of Saturday, March 27, 2010, Krentz sent a radio transmission to his brother, Phil, in which he reportedly stated, "I see an immigrant out here, and he appears to need help. Call the Border Patrol." This was his last known transmission; after hours of radio silence aroused suspicions, he was found in a remote section of the ranch. Both he and his dog had been shot and had died from their wounds. Krentz had not been robbed, and in fact his gun was still in his holster. After being shot, he had lived long enough to return to his ATV and attempt to escape, but had lost consciousness and died before reaching safety.

Footprints at the crime scene led to the Mexican border, leading police to theorize an illegal immigrant was responsible. Subsequent investigations by the Cochise County Sheriff's Department continued to focus on a Mexican suspect, but suggested that the killing was non-random, that the perpetrator may have been a scout for a smuggling organization (rather than an immigrant), and noted that the day before the murder, federal agents had arrested 8 smugglers and seized 250 pounds of marijuana on the Krentz ranch.

== Reaction ==
The prospect that Krentz has been murdered by an illegal immigrant or Mexican drug smugglers sparked a national outcry. Gun sales surged by as much as 20% in the region where the murder occurred. Democratic and Republican lawmakers from Arizona and neighboring New Mexico, as well as former presidential candidate Tom Tancredo, called upon the federal government to send U.S. National Guard troops to secure the border in the aftermath of Krentz's murder. U.S. Representative Gabby Giffords stated, "The federal government must respond appropriately. All options should be on the table."

The Department of Homeland Security increased their presence in the region and offered a $25,000 reward for information leading to the capture of Krentz's killer. Reaction to the death led to increased public support for a broad and aggressive bill in the state legislature aimed at combating illegal immigration, Arizona SB1070, which was passed and signed into law by Governor Jan Brewer within a month of the killing.

== See also ==
- Illegal immigration to the United States
- History of laws concerning immigration and naturalization in the United States
