= Utah Compact =

2010 civic declaration of immigration principles

The Utah Compact is a declaration of five principles whose stated purpose is to "guide Utah's immigration discussion." At a ceremony held on the grounds of the Utah State Capitol on November 11, 2010, it was signed by business, law enforcement and religious leaders including the Catholic Diocese of Salt Lake City, and by various other community leaders and individuals.

== Principles ==
The Principles of the Utah Compact are

1. Federal Solutions. Immigration, including border policy is a federal issue.
2. Law Enforcement. Law Enforcement should have discretion. Local law enforcement should focus on criminal activity rather than violations of federal civil code.
3. Families. Stating opposition to policies that unnecessarily separate families.
4. Economy. Recognition of the economic role of immigrants. Advocates support for free market policies to maximize individual freedom and opportunity.
5. A Free Society. Recognition that immigrants are part of society. States the need for a "humane approach to this reality, reflecting our unique culture, history and spirit of inclusion.

== Reception ==
Among supporters, the compact was complimented in a New York Times editorial as coming from "people of good sense and good will". The Church of Jesus Christ of Latter-day Saints (LDS Church) endorsed the Compact via a public statement, though it declined to sign the Compact itself. The LDS Church counts about half of Utah's residents as its adherents, but the Compact is more controversial in Utah Mormon culture itself.

== Criticism ==
The Utah Compact is alleged by the Minuteman Project, conservative commentator Bob Lonsberry, and former Arizona State Senator Karen Johnson to contain deliberately misleading language intended to subtly promote tolerance of illegal immigration, opposition to enforcement of immigration law, and amnesty for illegal aliens.

== See also ==
- Immigration reform in the United States
