= Juvenile sex offenders in the United States =

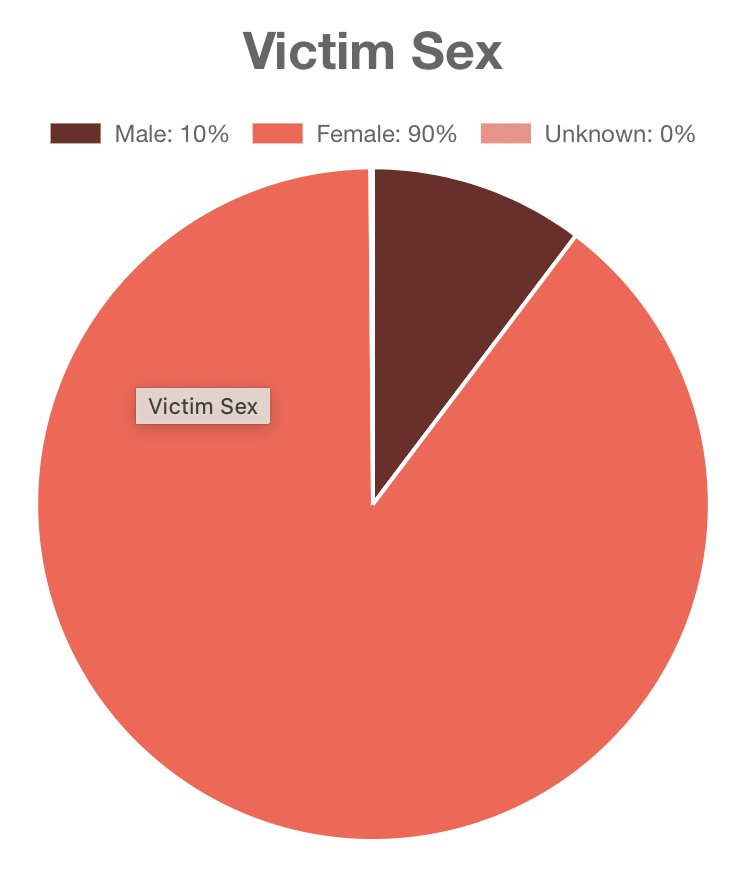
Pie chart of victim sexes

A juvenile sex crime is defined as a legally proscribed sexual crime committed without consent by a minor under the age of 18. The act involves coercion, manipulation, a power imbalance between the perpetrator and victim, and threats of violence. The sexual offenses that fall under juvenile sex crimes range from non-contact to penetration. The severity of the sexual assault in the crime committed is often the amount of trauma and/or injuries the victim has suffered. Typically within these crimes, female children are the majority demographic of those targeted and the majority of offenders are male. Juvenile sex offenders are different than adult sex offenders in a few ways, as captured by National Incident Based Reporting System: they are more likely to be committed in school, offend in groups and against acquaintances, target young children as victims, and to have a male victim, whereas they are less likely than their adult counterpart to commit rape.

According to the FBI, from 2019 to 2020, there were 132,091 rape incidents and 137,235 offenses reported in the US. 22% of those rape offenses were committed by offenders age 10–19. Throughout the past 10 years, juveniles have been the largest age demographic to have committed rape offenses, as documented by the NIBRS.

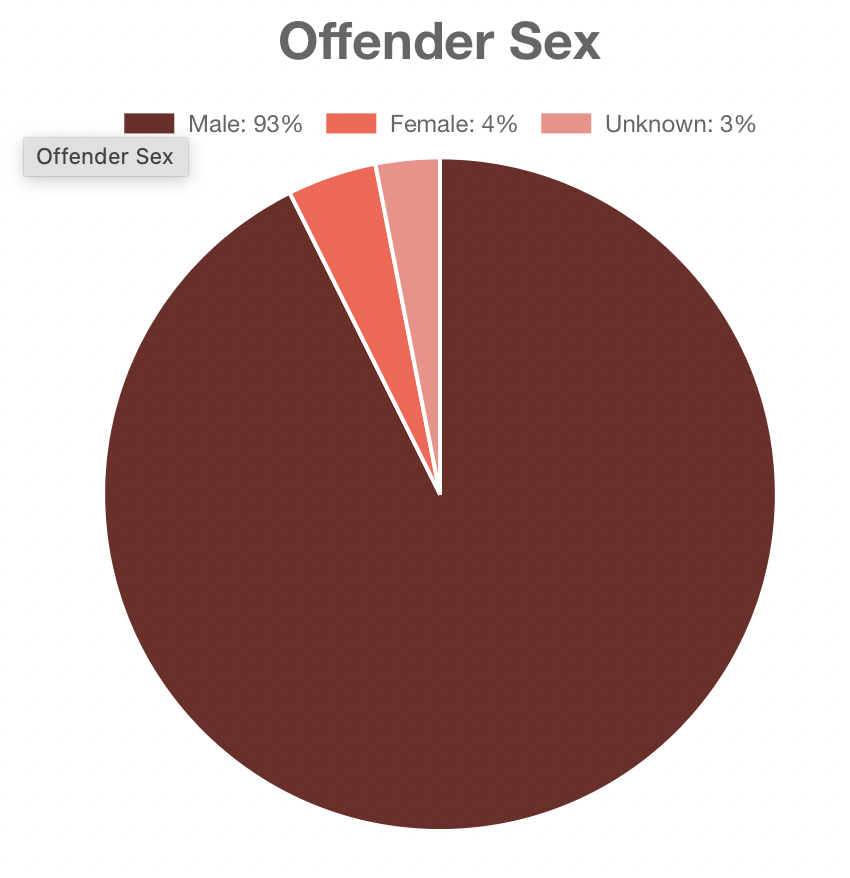
Pie chart of offender sexes

There is an abundance of diversity in the motivation and backgrounds of juvenile sex offenders. The numerous characteristics of juvenile sex offenders include maladaptive personality traits, historical accounts of sexual and physical abuse and maltreatment, as well as inter- and intra-personal relationship strenuosity. There have been many attempts by clinicians and psychologists alike to classify types of juvenile sex offenders based on these characteristics, including the difference between male and female perpetrators of juvenile sex offenses.

Historically and especially more recently, the United States has taken on a "protect society" approach when it comes to dealing with juvenile sex offenders. While policies and requirements of the criminal justice system vary by state, there are consistencies in attempts to manage juvenile sex crimes including a sex offender registry and the courts and sentencing process.

Rehabilitation remains the primary approach for addressing juvenile sexual offending among individuals typically aged 11 to 17 based on the understanding that young people are still developing and can change behaviors over time. Research shows lower rates of sexual reoffending among juveniles compared to adults , and many intervention programs have been linked to positive outcomes.However results are not consistent in every case , and some individuals continue to reoffend, especially when risk factors such as unstable environments or lack or treatment are present. Because of these differences, researchers and policymakers continue to evaluate and improve rehabilitation strategies to better reduce recidivism and support long-term behavioral change.

== Characteristics ==
Juvenile sexual offenders are a heterogenous group of people, meaning they are diverse in the backgrounds and traits that contribute to their development into a sex offender as a minor. Juvenile sex offenders vary in offense characteristics and differ in many variables such as victim and relationship characteristics, level of aggression used, and triggers.

=== Sexual victimization and abuse ===
Sexual victimization of juveniles plays a strong role in developing their sexually abusive behavior. According to an analysis of the relationship between sexual behavior problems and child sexual abuse done by Darkness to Light, children who have been sexually abused have more than three times as many sexual behavior problems as children who have not been sexually abused. Child sex abuse has also been associated with high levels of risk behaviors and maladaptive personality traits, which are contributing factors to the commission of sex crimes.

A number of studies cite the impact of sexual victimization on subsequent youth sex offenses. For example, child sexual abuse that occurs in a period between ages 3 to 7 have been found to put youth at the highest risk for perpetrating sexual abuse later in life. The sexual abuse perpetrated later in life reflects the findings of a study done by Veneziano, Veneziano, and LeGrand, which states that sexually victimized juveniles were more likely to commit sexual behaviors that were similar to how they were sexually victimized. Burton's 2008 study applies the learning theory to juvenile sex crimes, suggesting that sexually abusive behaviors may have developed in youth because they have learned it from their own sexual victimizers.

Childhood sexual abuse is heavily correlated with other developmental risk factors including childhood maltreatment and personality variables.

=== Maltreatment ===
Experiences of maltreatment during childhood, including physical abuse, neglect, and witnessing family violence, have been associated with juvenile sex offenses. Many studies compare the backgrounds of juvenile sex offenders to adult sex offenders in order to demonstrate the correlation between historical childhood maltreatment and the commission of sex crimes as a youth. A study done by Leibowitz, Burton, and Howard in 2012 found that sexually victimized sexual abusers reported greater levels of sexual victimization and emotional and physical abuse and neglect than non-sexually victimized delinquent adolescents as well as more behavioral and developmental problems. Extra-familial sexual abuse and intra-familial child maltreatment were found to occur more often in juvenile sexual offenders. Other research suggests offenders who cite historical maltreatment begin offending earlier than offenders who were not maltreated. Rapists and child molesters who began offending as juveniles have higher rates of physical and emotional abuse as well as childhood sexual victimization experiences. Additionally, it is cited that high levels of coexisting anxiety and depression have been found in offenders who have experienced childhood physical abuse and exposure to violence against females.

=== Relationships ===
As well as maltreatment perpetrated by family members, familial instability, disorganization, and violence have been highly correlated with juveniles who engage in sexually abusive behaviors. Attachment disrupted by familial distress can negatively affect the formation of an abundance of relationships later in life, including bonds formed with peers, society, and romantic interests. Attachment disorders and childhood abuse/neglect can contribute to criminality in the future due to the likelihood of developing antisocial personality traits. This idea is supported by the findings of various studies, including multiple analyses of juvenile sex offenders by researchers such as Becker (1998) and Miner (1997) that have suggested that physical and/or emotional separation from one or both parents is a trait found in many juvenile sex offenders. Social competence has also been found to be lacking in juveniles experiencing sexual behavior problems. Inadequate social skills, a contributor to social isolation, has also been found in juvenile sex offenders who have fewer peer attachments in school. It is evident that the ability to build interpersonal relationships affects the potential engagement in sexually aggressive behaviors by youth.

=== Deviant sexual tendencies and thoughts ===
Although literature has highlighted the ambiguity of research into this area, many studies suggest a correlation of deviant sexual arousal, beliefs, and histories with sexually aggressive behavior. Researchers like Hunter and Becker in their analysis of the causes and treatment implications of the role of deviant sexual arousal in juvenile sex offenders emphasize its prevalence and suggest numerous theories, some including the idea that deviant interests develop early in life and strengthen through committing sexual acts with the deviant thoughts in mind and the notion that some people may be biologically predisposed to these thoughts due to a chemical or hormonal imbalance in the brain. A limited, but notable amount of research points to the role pornographic material plays in the development of deviant sexual attitudes in adolescents.

=== Academic performance ===
It is typically reported within studies that juvenile sex offenders often experience trouble academically. While there is not much evidence to back all claims regarding the academic and intellectual capabilities and influences on juveniles, there is some research to suggest juveniles often have difficulties with disruptive behavior, absence, learning disabilities, attention problems, executive functions, and difficulties with language. Some research has also found cognitive distortions observed in juveniles who have been abused during childhood to have a potential impact on their recognizance of empathy and emotion in others.

=== Mental health ===
Mental health issues have frequently been cited in juvenile sex offenders. Many male juvenile sex offenders have been diagnosed with a conduct disorder and antisocial traits. Impulsivity and poor/ inappropriate behavioral traits have been frequently observed in juvenile sex offender population. A study published in the Child Adolescent Psychiatry Mental Health journal found that three quarters of the juvenile sex offenders they studied met the criteria required for at least one mental disorder, and that more than half of them experienced multiple mental disorders and were functionally impaired. Additionally, juvenile sex offenders with younger victims had an overall lower level of functioning.

Many of these personality disorders arise because of frequent maltreatment, abuse, neglect, etc., that has been previously mentioned. A higher prevalence of depression in adolescents who have sexually offended compared to the general adolescent population is notable to discuss, especially because of its relevance to frequent childhood physical and sexual abuse. It has been observed by Becker (1997) that "sexually aggressive juveniles who had histories of childhood physical abuse or sexual abuse had higher rates of depressive symptoms, with as many as 29.2 percent of these offenders appearing severely depressed."

== Female offenders ==
Current research on the lack of literature on female-perpetrated juvenile sexual offenses indicates that female sexual offenders are underrepresented and underreported, which has recently led to an increase in interest in the study of female juvenile sex offenders. A few hypotheses that have been suggested to support this phenomenon have been the ideas that individuals consider females to be incapable of committing sex offenses, society is not prepared to accept female adolescent sexual behavior, and law enforcement professionals may believe young females are at lower risk to sexually offend compared to young males.

Excluding prostitution, NIBRS reports that 7% of all juvenile sex offenders are female and that they account for 1% of adolescent-committed forcible rapes. A report done by ChildLine found that 15% of youth who called their hotline in 2005 and 2006 about experienced sexual abuse stated that their perpetrator had been female. In the following two to three years, that percentage increased to 24%. Despite the relatively low rates of incidence of female-perpetrated juvenile sex crimes, there are several distinct characteristics that differentiate female and male juvenile sex offenders.

Female adolescent sex offenders typically offend at a younger age than their male counterpart. They have also found to be less likely to commit aggressive, forcible acts such as rape. Youth females tend to select younger victims due to many child-care positions available to them. A consistent finding by many researchers such as Ray and English (1995) and Bumby and Bumby (1997) that juvenile females experience a greater percentage of sexual, physical, and emotional abuse and/or neglect than juvenile males. They have also discovered that while young female sex offenders faced some academic problems, they faced more behavioral problems which included missing school, stealing, and consuming drugs and alcohol.

== Classification ==
Although there is no set system to classify and group the types of juvenile sex offenders, numerous researchers have created categories based on their own studies that are relevant to criminal justice literature on juvenile sex offenders. Because of the differences between female and male juvenile sex offenders, these typologies tended to favor and therefor more accurately represent male juvenile sex offenders.

Researchers O’Brien and Bera (1986) grouped juvenile sex offenders into seven categories of juvenile sex offenders: naive experimenters, under socialized child exploiters, sexual aggressives, sexual compulsives, disturbed impulsives, group influenced, and pseudo socialized.

Graves, Openshaw, Ascione, Ericksen (1996) grouped juveniles sex offenders into three categories: pedophilic, sexual assault, and undifferentiated or mixed offender. Pedophilic juveniles were described be lacking in confidence and therefor socially isolated. Sexual assault offenders tended to victimize older females and were reported to commit their first offense between ages of 13 and 15. The victim age and offense type vary greatly for those labeled as undifferentiated or mixed offender. They were also described to have the most severe social and psychological problems.

Prentky and others (2000) created six categories: child molesters, rapists, sexually reactive children, fondlers, paraphilic offenders, and unclassifiable. Child molesters victimized youth under age 12 and were at least five years older than the victim. Those labeled as rapists and fondlers offended against victims age 12 or older and had an age difference of less than five years; however, those in the fondler category only committed acts limited to fondling, caressing, or non-consented rubbing. Sexually reactive offenders and their victims were under 11. Those in the paraphilic offender category did not physically touch their victims, however they committed acts such as exhibitionism and obscene phone calls.

Weinrott (1998) suggested four categories of juvenile sexual offenders: general juvenile delinquents, those with deviant arousal, the psychopathic offenders, and those do not fit into any of the three categories and do not need much intervention.

=== Subtypes based on victim age ===
Many researchers have found notable differences in victim age that warrant their classification.

Child victims: Multiple studies suggest that those who target prepubescent children are more likely to: have worse psychosocial functions, offend against their relatives, use less aggression during sexual offending, have less sexual experience, and be socially isolated from their peers.

Peer and Adult victims: Studies suggest that offenders who target pubescent and post-pubescent victims are more likely to use force during their sexual offense, have a prior arrest history, have substance abuse and behavior problems, and target unknown victims.

=== Subtypes based on delinquent history ===
Research also highlights the differences in delinquent history that warrants classification.

Butler and Seto (2002) gathered youth male offenders in an attempt to differentiate between juveniles who has history of sexual offenses and nonsexual offenses. Those who were only ever charged with sexual offenses were labeled as "sex only" whereases those who had been charged with both nonsexual and sexual offenses were labeled "sex plus." Those who were sex-only offenders were more likely to offend against child and male victims as well as have fewer romantic relationships and more atypical sexual interests. Sex-plus offenders were more likely to possess antisocial traits, use drugs, have been physically abused, and have caused more injury to the victim.

Another study made by researchers McCuish, Lussier, and Corrado (2015) split their sample of juvenile sexual and nonsexual offenders between overt and covert groups. Juvenile sexual offenders who belonged to the overt group emphasize the confrontational nature of these individuals, with sexual offending being an enduring pattern of belligerent behavior as well as the likelihood to offend against victims whom which they knew or were acquainted with. Juvenile sex offenders who belonged to the covert group actively tried to avoid their detection by offending against people who were more vulnerable and therefore less likely to report them.

=== Subtype based on multiple aspects ===
Researchers whose work highlights the combination of multiple juvenile sex offender traits support the intersection of victim age and delinquent history as well as victim age and personality characteristics.

Notably, certain clinicians found that "offenders against children were younger at the time of offense, less likely to be of foreign nationality, more likely to have male victims and showed less aggression in their offenses," when analyzing the intersection of victim age and delinquent history. They established a theory stating there are "distinct underlying psychological mechanisms" that differentiate offenders based on the age of the victim, which imply the need of researchers to consider multiple facets to gain an adequate understanding of juvenile sex offenders.

An important finding within the intersection of victim age and personality trait is the existence of certain personality traits that exist in adolescents who offend against their peers versus younger children. Four personality based subtypes were derived from an analysis of scores of the California Psychological Inventory. They included Antisocial/impulsive youth who were the rule breakers and offended due to deviant sexual arousal; Unusual/isolated youth who were the more emotionally distraught and faced social isolation; Over-controlled/reserved youth were those who kept more to themselves; And confident/aggressive youth who displayed outgoing and aggressive traits. The antisocial/impulsive and unusual/isolated were found to be more likely to commit violent or nonviolent offense.

== The United States' Treatment of Juvenile Sex Offenders ==
While although the policies and requirements regarding juvenile sex crime law vary by state, the country as a whole has historically and primarily focused on protecting society. This is reflected within two big approaches to maintaining adolescents who have and can commit sex crimes.

=== Sex offender registration ===
In 2006, the Sex Offender Registration and Notification Act (SORNA) was established in the US under the Adam Walsh Child Protection and Safety Act. It requires jurisdictions to register juveniles 14 years old at the time of offense and who have been "adjudicated delinquent of an offense equivalent to or more serve than aggravated sexual abuse." These jurisdictions include D.C., U.S. territories, and federally recognized Indian tribes.

Registered sex offenders are required to update their registration according to SORNA guidelines (where they live, work, go to school, etc.) or they could be convicted of a crime. Some other information required under registration includes internet identifiers, advanced notification of international travel, all background information including social security number and driver's license, and finger/palm prints.

States are allowed to require things beyond the baseline requirements needed to meet SORNA guidelines. The length of registration varies by state and criminal sexual offense. However, lifetime registration is not required under SORNA and typically, if offenders have maintained a clean record, their registration can be terminated after 25 years.

As of 2011, jurisdictions are not required to publicly notify the community of juveniles registered as sex offenders. Jurisdictions may choose to notify community agencies or individuals to protect the interests and safety of the public and to let schools and law enforcement know when a registered juvenile sex offender is enrolling in their school.

=== Sentencing ===
All crimes committed by children under the age of 18 are dealt with by juvenile courts. In every case, the offender has the right to a lawyer. The court process contains two main parts, the trial, and the sentencing. The trial is also known as adjudication, or fact-finding. Evidence pertaining to the case is presented by both the prosecutor and defendant. The sentencing portion is also known as the disposition hearing. Here, the judge determines whether or not the adolescent is delinquent based on the trial. The judge can then sentence the adjudicated to probation, placement into a rehabilitative facility, and/or restitution. Depending on the charge, one could face 10 years to life and upwards of $25,000 in fines. In certain serious, felony sex crimes, minors under the age of 18 can be tried as an adult. These conditions vary from state to state depending on severity of the offense, previous criminal record, and age. Generally, the age a juvenile case can be transferred to adult court is 14-16 and requires certain circumstances. For example, minors age 14 and up who commit first degree rape can be charged as adults in Maryland.
