= Joe Arpaio =

American law enforcement officer, politician (born 1932)

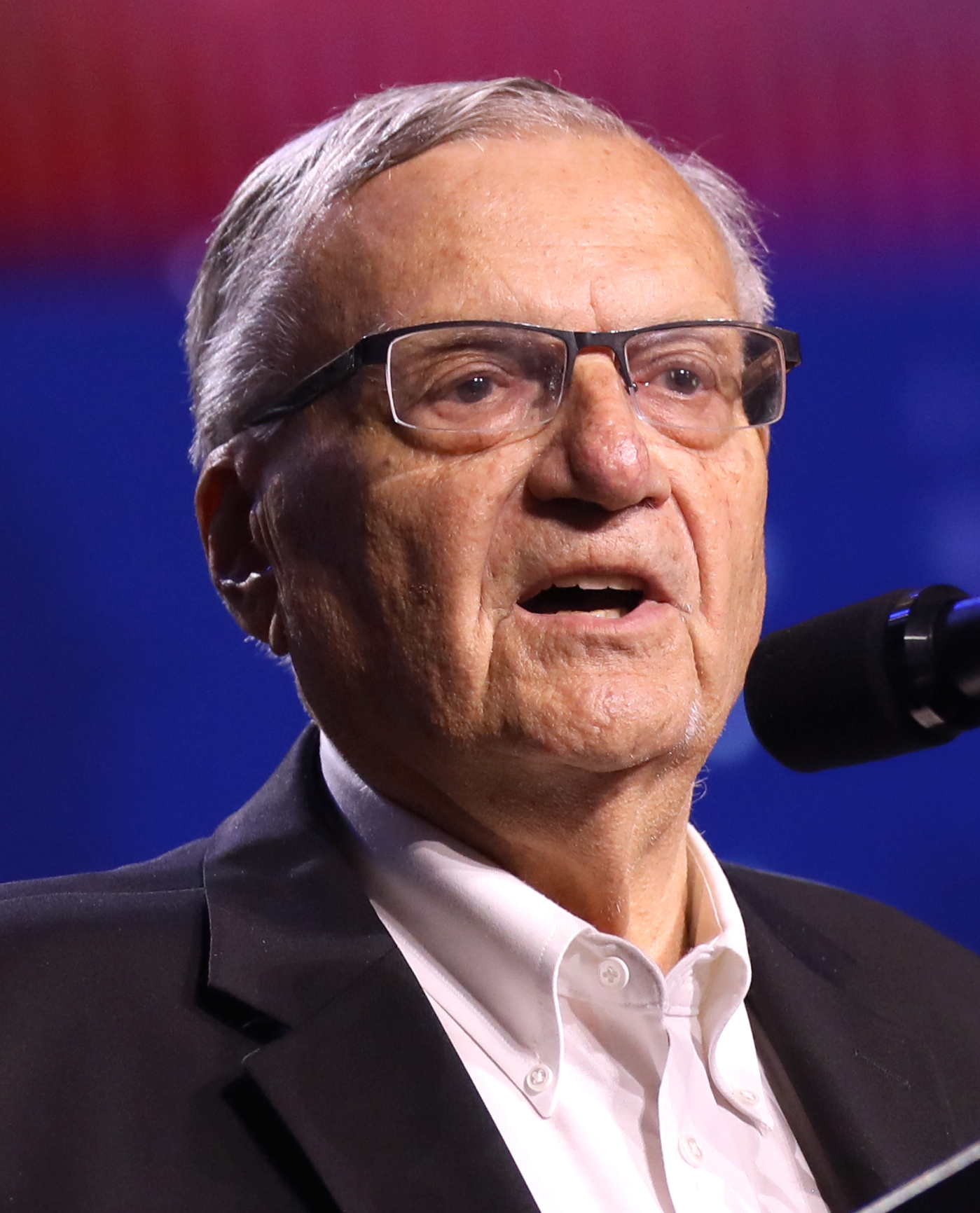
- Arpaio in 2024

36th Sheriff of Maricopa County
- In office January 1, 1993 – January 1, 2017
- Preceded by: Tom Agnos
- Succeeded by: Paul Penzone

Personal details
- Born: Joseph Michael Arpaio; June 14, 1932 (age 94) Springfield, Massachusetts, U.S.
- Party: Republican
- Spouse: Ava Lamb (m. 1958; died 2021)
- Children: 2
- Criminal information
- Conviction: Criminal contempt of court (federal misdemeanor)

Military service
- Allegiance: United States
- Branch/service: United States Army
- Years of service: 1950–1954
- Unit: Medical Detachment Division

Joseph Michael Arpaio (/ɑːrˈpaɪoʊ/; born June 14, 1932) is an American former law enforcement officer and politician. He was the Sheriff of Maricopa County, Arizona, for 24 years, from 1993 to 2017, losing reelection to Democrat Paul Penzone in 2016.

Starting in 2005, Arpaio took an outspoken stance against illegal immigration, styling himself as "America's Toughest Sheriff". In 2010, he became a flashpoint for opposition to Arizona's SB1070 anti-illegal immigrant law, which was largely struck down by the Supreme Court of the United States. Arpaio is also known for investigating former US President Barack Obama's birth certificate, and, as of 2018, he continued to claim, without evidence, that it was forged.

Arpaio has been accused of numerous types of police misconduct, including abuse of power, misuse of funds, failure to investigate sex crimes, criminal negligence, abuse of suspects in custody, improper clearance of cases, unlawful enforcement of immigration laws, and election law violations. A Federal court monitor was appointed to oversee his office's operations because of complaints of racial profiling. The U.S. Department of Justice concluded that Arpaio oversaw the worst pattern of racial profiling in US history, and subsequently filed suit against him for unlawful discriminatory police conduct. Arpaio and the Maricopa County Sheriff's Office (MCSO) were named as defendants in dozens of civil lawsuits brought by citizens arrested by Arpaio and his deputies alleging wrongful arrest, wrongful death, entrapment and other claims, costing taxpayers in Maricopa County over $140 million in litigation against Arpaio during his tenure as sheriff.

Over the course of his career, Arpaio was the subject of several federal civil rights lawsuits. In one case, he was a defendant in a decade-long suit in which a federal court issued an injunction barring him from conducting further "immigration round-ups". A federal court subsequently found that after the order was issued, Arpaio's office continued to detain "persons for further investigation without reasonable suspicion that a crime has been or is being committed." In July 2017, he was convicted of criminal contempt of court, a crime for which he was pardoned by President Donald Trump on August 25, 2017. In a separate racial-profiling case which concluded in 2013, Arpaio and his subordinates were found to have unfairly targeted Hispanics in conducting traffic stops.

Although Arpaio sought another term as Maricopa County Sheriff in 2016, the contempt of court charge eroded much of his remaining political support, and he was defeated in the election by Paul Penzone, a Democrat who reversed many of Arpaio's policies after taking office. Arpaio was an unsuccessful candidate in Arizona's Republican primary election for U.S. Senate in 2018. In 2020, Arpaio failed in his attempt to become the Maricopa County Sheriff again. In 2022 and 2024, he lost in his attempts to unseat the incumbent mayor of Fountain Hills, Arizona.

== Early life ==
Arpaio was born in Springfield, Massachusetts, on June 14, 1932, to Italian parents, both from Lacedonia, in the region of Campania, in Italy. Arpaio's mother died while giving birth to him, and he was raised by his father, who ran an Italian grocery store. Arpaio completed high school and worked in his father's business until age 18 when he enlisted in the United States Army. He served in the Army from 1950 to 1954 in the Medical Department and was stationed in France for part of the time as a military policeman.

Following his army discharge in 1954, Arpaio moved to Washington, D.C., and became a police officer, moving in 1957 to Las Vegas, Nevada. He served as a police officer in Las Vegas for six months before being appointed as a special agent with the Federal Bureau of Narcotics, which later became part of the Drug Enforcement Administration (DEA). During his 25-year tenure with the DEA, he was stationed in Argentina, Turkey, and Mexico, and advanced through the ranks to the position of head of the DEA's Arizona branch.

After leaving the DEA, Arpaio became involved in a travel venture through his wife's travel agency Starworld Travel Agency, based in Scottsdale. While there, he sold passage on the Phoenix E space rocket, which was hoped to take off from either Edwards Air Force Base or Vandenberg Air Force Base on the 500th anniversary of Christopher Columbus' voyage to the new world. Although he claimed in 1988 that the first 19 flights of the Phoenix E had been booked, no flights were ever made.

== Tenure as sheriff (1993–2017) ==
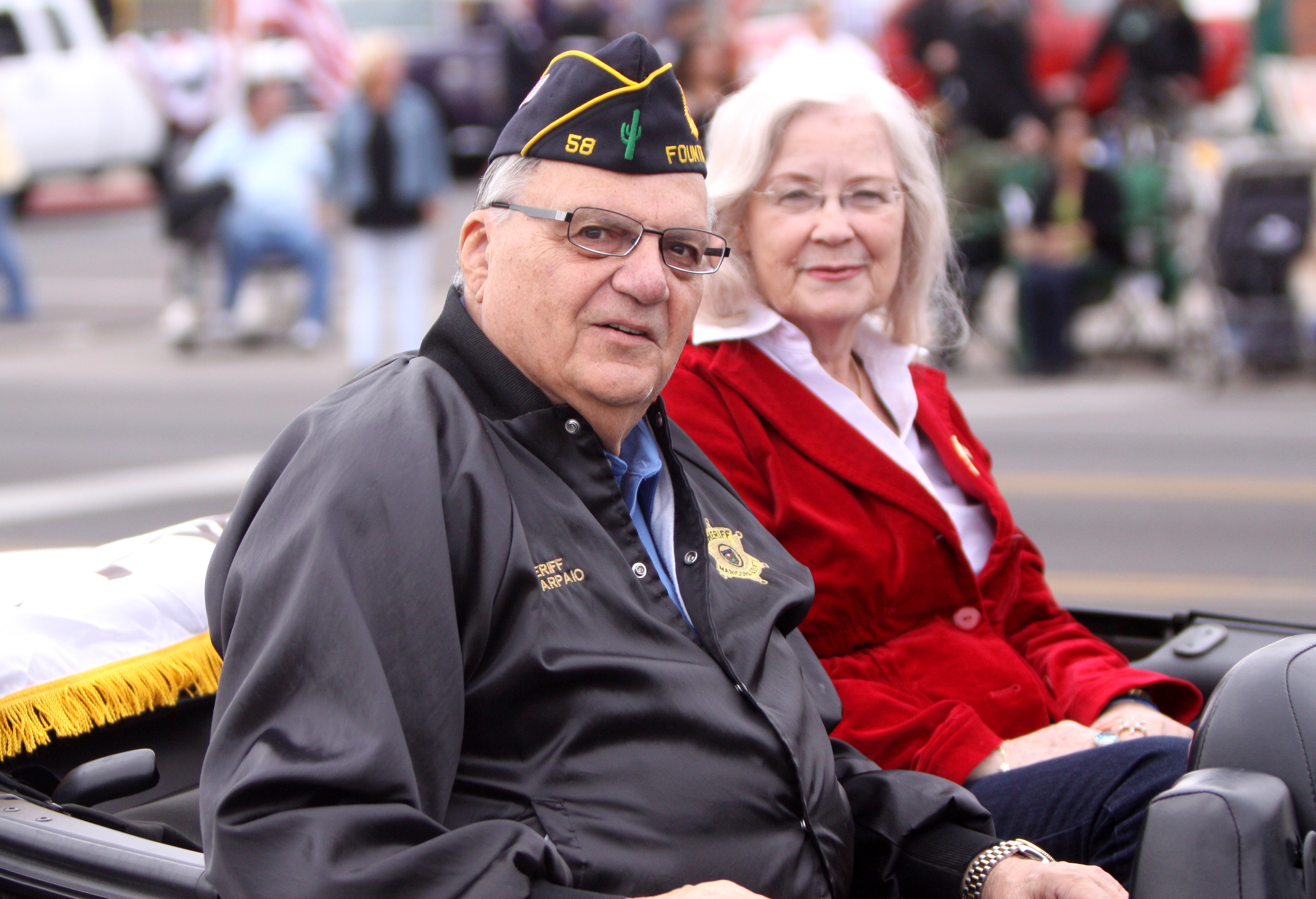
Arpaio and his wife, Ava, at the 2011 Veterans Day parade in Phoenix, Arizona

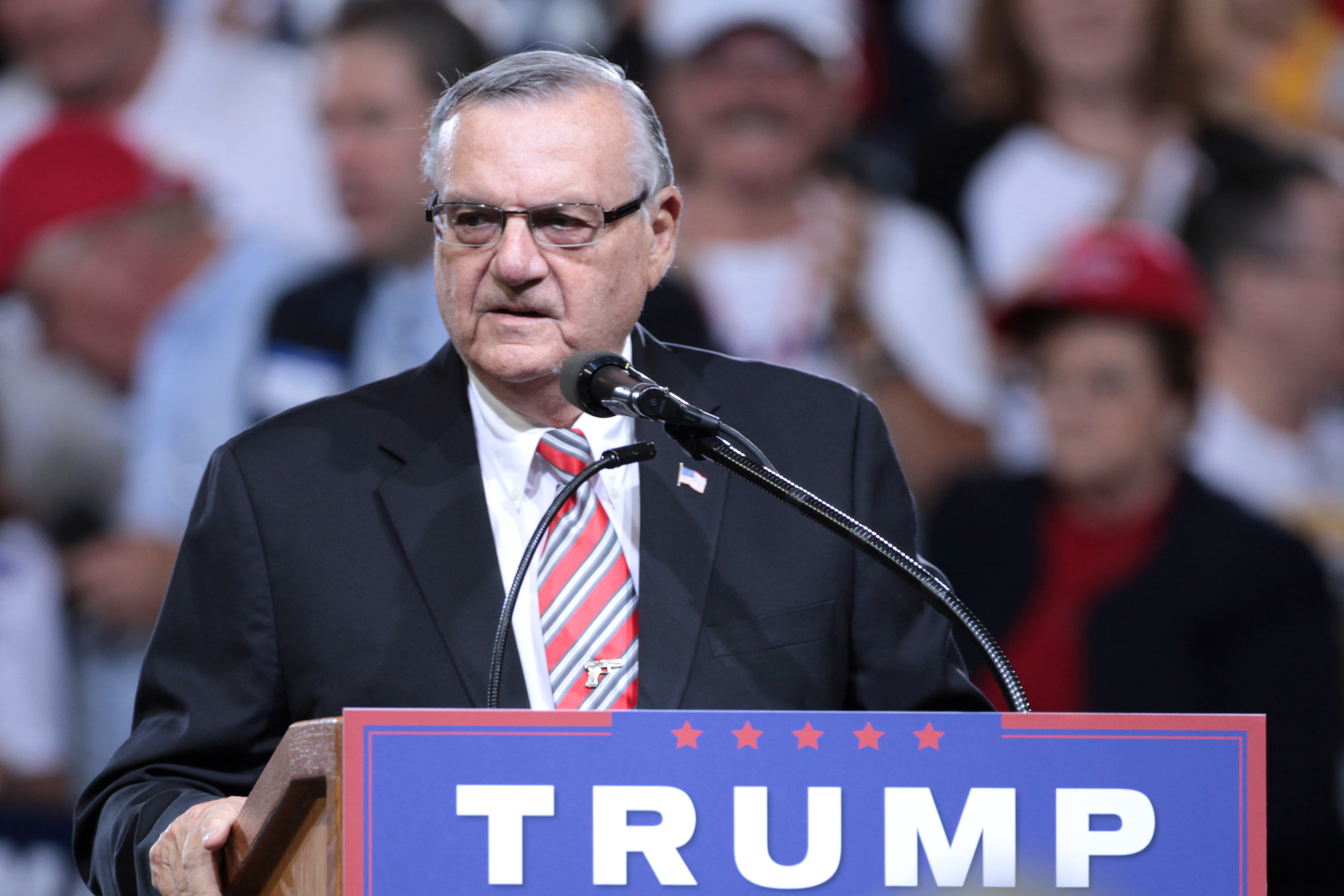
Arpaio speaking at a campaign rally for Donald Trump in Phoenix, Arizona

Arpaio was first elected as sheriff in 1992. He was re-elected in 1996, 2000, 2004, 2008 and 2012. Throughout his tenure as sheriff Arpaio sought out media coverage. He was featured and profiled by news media worldwide and claimed to average 200 television appearances per month. In late 2008 and early 2009, Arpaio appeared in Smile...You're Under Arrest!, a three-episode Fox Reality Channel series in which persons with outstanding warrants were tricked into presenting themselves for arrest.

=== Jail conditions ===
Arpaio's jail detention practices included serving inmates Nutraloaf and edibles recovered from food rescue and limiting meals to twice daily. He also banned inmates from possessing "sexually explicit material" including Playboy magazine, after female officers complained that inmates openly masturbated while viewing the articles. The ban was challenged on First Amendment grounds, but was upheld by the United States Court of Appeals for the Ninth Circuit.

In February 2007, Arpaio instituted an in-house radio station he called KJOE, broadcasting classical music, opera, Frank Sinatra hits, patriotic music, and educational programming five days a week, four hours each day.

Federal Judge Neil V. Wake ruled in 2008 and 2010 that the Maricopa County jails violated the constitutional rights of inmates in medical and other care-related issues.

In 2013, National Geographic Channel featured Arpaio's jail in the Banged Up Abroad episode of "Raving Arizona". The episode told the story of the Ecstasy dealer Shaun Attwood who started the blog Jon's Jail Journal.

=== Tent city jail ===
In 1993, Arpaio set up a "Tent City" — which he described as a "concentration camp" — as a temporary extension of the Maricopa County Jail for convicted and sentenced prisoners. It was located in a yard next to a more permanent structure. He later claimed that the "concentration camp" remark had been a joke, pointing out: "What difference does it make? I still survived. I still kept getting re-elected.”

In 1995, Arpaio reinstituted chain gangs. In 1996, he expanded the chain gang concept by instituting female volunteer chain gangs. Female inmates worked seven hours a day, 7 a.m. to 2 p.m., six days a week. He also instituted the world's first all-juvenile volunteer chain gang; volunteers earned high school credit toward a diploma.

In 1997, Amnesty International said Arpaio's tent city jail was not an "adequate or humane alternative to housing inmates in suitable ... jail facilities." Tent City was criticized by groups contending that there were violations of human and constitutional rights. Arpaio stated he reserved the punishment of living in Tent City "for those who have been convicted."

During the summer of 2003, when outside temperatures exceeded 110 °F (43 °C), Arpaio said to complaining inmates, "It's 120 degrees [49 °C] in Iraq and the soldiers are living in tents and they didn't commit any crimes, so shut your mouths!" On July 2, 2011, when the temperature in Phoenix hit 118 °F (48 °C), Arpaio measured the temperature inside these tents at 145 °F (63 °C). Some inmates complained that fans near their beds were not working, and that their shoes were melting from the heat.

In April 2017, it was announced by newly elected Sheriff Paul Penzone that the Tent City jail would be shut down.

=== Public relations actions ===
One of Arpaio's public relations actions was the requirement that inmates wear pink underwear in order to prevent its theft by the released inmates. He claimed this saved the county $70,000 in the first year the rule was in effect. Arpaio subsequently started to sell customized pink boxers, with the Maricopa County Sheriff's logo and "Go Joe", as a fund-raiser for Sheriff's Posse Association. Despite allegations of misuse of funds received from these sales, Arpaio declined to provide an accounting for the money.

Arpaio's success in gaining press coverage with the pink underwear resulted in his extending the use of the color. He introduced pink handcuffs, using the event to promote his book, Sheriff Joe Arpaio, America's Toughest Sheriff. Arpaio has said "I can get elected on pink underwear... I've done it five times."

In 2004, Arpaio ordered all undocumented immigrants then in jail to register for the Selective Service System.

=== Immigration posse ===
In November 2010, Arpaio created an armed illegal immigration operations posse to help his deputies enforce immigration law. Members of the posse included actors Steven Seagal, Lou Ferrigno, and Peter Lupus. Because the MCSO lost its authority to enforce immigration law (both by losing its 287(g) authority and through a federal court order in Melendres v. Arpaio), as of 2013, the immigration posse is no longer active. While the MCSO website claimed 3,000 posse members, as of July 29, 2015, the posse had 986 members.

=== Organizations criticizing Arpaio ===
Arpaio was a controversial sheriff. His practices were criticized by government agencies such as the United States Department of Justice and United States district courts, as well as organizations such as Amnesty International, the American Civil Liberties Union (ACLU), the Arizona Ecumenical Council, the American Jewish Committee, and the Arizona chapter of the Anti-Defamation League. The editorial board of The New York Times called Arpaio "America's Worst Sheriff". Controversies surrounding Arpaio included allegations of racial profiling, for which the ACLU sued the sheriff's office.

=== Claims that sheriff's office failed to properly investigate serious crimes ===
In 2000 it was claimed that the sheriff's office failed to properly investigate serious crimes, including the rape of a 14-year-old girl by classmates, and the rape of a 15-year-old girl by two strangers. These cases were reported as "exceptionally cleared" (solved) by the MCSO without investigation or, in one instance, without even identifying a suspect – in contravention of Federal Bureau of Investigation (FBI) standards for exceptional clearance.

In the case of the 15-year-old girl, the case was closed within one month and before DNA testing was even complete, a 13-year-old's because her mother did not want to "pursue this investigation," and the 14-year-old's because a suspect declined to appear for questioning. In a statement to ABC15, the sheriff's office claimed "The Goldwater Institute's report cites the FBI's Uniform Code [sic] Reporting handbook, which is a voluntary crime-reporting program to compile statistical information and reports. The UCR is not intended for oversight on how law enforcement agencies clear cases... The Sheriff's Office has its own criteria for clearing cases."

The Arizona Department of Public Safety, which serves as the repository for Arizona case clearance statistics, told 12 News that the guidelines in the FBI Uniform Crime Reporting Handbook are mandatory for all Arizona law enforcement agencies. Those guidelines specify that a case can be cleared by exception only when a perpetrator's identity and location is known and there is sufficient evidence to support prosecution, but, due to special circumstances (such as the suspect dying, or extradition not being possible), an arrest cannot be made.

In an interview on the ABC's Nightline news program, when asked to explain why 82 percent of cases were declared cleared by exception, Arpaio said, "We do clear a higher percentage of that. I know that. We clear many, many cases – not 18 percent." Nightline contacted the MCSO after the interview and was told that of 7,346 crimes, only 944, or 15%, had been cleared by arrest.

Under Arpaio, the MCSO may have improperly cleared (reported as solved) as many as 75% of cases without arrest or proper investigation.

==== Sex crime investigations and rapist Patrick Morrison ====
During a three-year period ending in 2007, more than 400 sex crimes reported to Arpaio's office were inadequately investigated or not investigated at all. While providing police services for El Mirage, Arizona, the MCSO under Arpaio failed to follow through on at least 32 reported child molestations, even though the suspects were known in all but six cases. Many of the victims were children of illegal immigrants.

In a controversial case, Arpaio's office was accused of ignoring Sabrina Morrison, a teenage girl suffering from a mental disability. On March 7, 2007, the 13-year-old was raped by her uncle, Patrick Morrison. She told her teacher the next day, and her teacher called the MCSO. A rape kit was taken, but the detective assigned to the case told Sabrina and her family that there were no obvious signs of sexual assault, no semen, or signs of trauma.

As a result of the detective's statements, Sabrina was branded by her family as a liar. Her uncle continued to rape her repeatedly, saying he would kill her if she told anyone. She became pregnant by him, and had an abortion. The family did not know that the rape kit had been tested at the state lab and showed the presence of semen. The lab requested that the detective obtain a blood sample from the suspect, Patrick Morrison. Instead of obtaining the blood sample, or making an arrest, the detective filed the crime-lab note and closed the case for four years.

In September 2011 the sheriff's office obtained a blood sample from Patrick Morrison, which was a DNA match with the semen taken over four years earlier. Patrick Morrison was arrested and charged in February 2012; he pleaded guilty and was sentenced to 24 years in prison.

In December 2011, responding to continuing media coverage of the controversy, and apparently unaware that there were hundreds of victims in these cases, Arpaio stated in a press conference, "If there were any victims, I apologize to those victims."

In August 2012, Sabrina Morrison filed a notice of claim against Arpaio and Maricopa County for gross negligence. In April 2015, the case settled for $3.5 million.

An internal memo written by one of the detectives assigned to the Morrison case blamed a high case load, saying the special victims unit had gone from five detectives to just three, and the detectives left were often called off their cases to investigate special assignments. These included a credit card fraud case involving the Arizona Diamondbacks and a mortgage fraud case in Arpaio's home city of Fountain Hills.

When county supervisors provided more than $600,000 to fund six additional detective positions to investigate child abuse in fiscal 2007, none were added to the sex-crimes squad. Sheriff's administrators concluded they had no idea where positions were added or what became of the money after it was added to the budget.

=== Targeting of reporters ===
In October 2007, Mike Lacey and Jim Larkin, the founders and leaders of the Phoenix New Times, were arrested after publishing a news article on a grand jury investigation involving Arpaio's office. On the evening that the article was published, Lacey and Larkin were arrested by plainclothes sheriff's deputies, "handcuffed, put in dark SUVs with tinted windows and driven to jail."

Following a public uproar over the arrests, all charges were dropped against Lacey and Larkin. Lacey and Larkin filed a federal Section 1983 lawsuit for the violations of their civil rights, and in 2012 the U.S. Court of Appeals for the Ninth Circuit ruled that they could sue the Maricopa County Sheriff's Office for the arrests.

In 2013, the Maricopa County Board of Supervisors voted to settle the suit for $3.75 million. Lacey and Larkin used the proceeds of the settlement to establish an endowed chair professorship at the Walter Cronkite School of Journalism and Mass Communication at Arizona State University, and to establish the Lacey & Larkin Frontera Fund, which advocates for migrant rights and freedom of speech issues in Arizona.

=== Targeting of political opponents ===
Between 2008 and 2010, Arpaio and former Maricopa County Attorney Andrew Thomas together undertook a number of government-corruption investigations targeting political opponents, including judges, county supervisors and administrators. These investigations resulted in: lawsuits against the Maricopa County Board of Supervisors, a federal civil-racketeering suit against the supervisors, four judges, and attorneys who worked with the county; and filing of criminal charges against several individuals.

In early 2010, Arpaio and Thomas sought to have a grand jury indict a number of Maricopa County judges, Maricopa County supervisors, and employees of the Maricopa County Board of Supervisors. The grand jury, in an unusual rebuke, ordered the investigation ended. This action has been described as meaning that "the case is so bad, there's no further evidence that could be brought" to substantiate it. Legal experts agreed this was a rare move.

Arpaio and Thomas lost every case, either by ruling of the courts or by dropping the case.

Arpaio's and Thomas' actions in these matters led to Thomas' disbarment by a disciplinary panel of the Arizona Supreme Court, which found that Thomas "outrageously exploited power, flagrantly fostered fear, and disgracefully misused the law" while serving as Maricopa County Attorney. The panel found "clear and convincing evidence" that Thomas brought unfounded and malicious criminal and civil charges against political opponents, including four state judges and the Arizona Attorney General. "Were this a criminal case," the panel concluded, "we are confident that the evidence would establish this conspiracy beyond a reasonable doubt."

At least 11 individuals filed lawsuits or legal claims as a result of being targeted by Arpaio and Thomas. The county settled all 11 cases:

List of settled cases
	Position	Settlement	County Legal Expenses
Gary Donahoe	Retired Superior Court Judge	$1,275,000	$767,127
Kenneth Fields	Retired Superior Court Judge	$100,000	$81,040
Barbara Mundell	Retired Superior Court Judge	$500,000	$134,273
Anna Baca	Retired Superior Court Judge	$100,000	$112,588
Stephen Wetzel	Former County Technology Director	$75,000	$107,647
Sandi Wilson	Deputy County Manager and County Budget Director	$122,000	$458,318
Don Stapley	Former County Supervisor	$3.5 million	$1,682,020
Mary Rose Wilcox	County Supervisor	$975,000	over $375,442
Susan Schuerman	Don Stapley's Executive Assistant	$500,000	$200,201
Conley Wolfswinkel	Don Stapley's Business Associate	$1,400,000	$1,586,152
Andy Kunasek	County Supervisor	$123,110	$1,150

In February 2010, Pima County Superior Court Judge John S. Leonardo found that Arpaio "misused the power of his office to target members of the Board of Supervisors for criminal investigation".

As of June 2014, costs to Maricopa County taxpayers related to Arpaio's and Thomas's failed corruption investigations exceeded $44 million, not including staff time.

=== Election law violation ===
In July 2010, a committee established by Arpaio (the "Campaign to Re-Elect Joe Arpaio 2012") funded advertisements critical of Rick Romley, a candidate in the Republican primary for Maricopa County Attorney, and Arizona Attorney General candidate Tom Horne, despite the fact that Arpaio was not running for re-election at the time (his term did not expire until the end of 2012).

In August 2010, following the filing of complaints to the Maricopa Elections Department, the Office of Maricopa County Attorney found that one of the advertisements, a direct mailer, advocated the defeat of Romley and was an in-kind contribution to Bill Montgomery (Romley's primary election opponent), in violation of Arizona election law. The order stated that a civil penalty in the amount of three times the amount of money spent on the mailer would be imposed on Campaign to Re-Elect Joe Arpaio 2012. In September 2010, Arpaio's campaign was fined $153,978. Montgomery ultimately defeated Romley in the primary election, with Romley stating Arpaio's ads "hurt" his results.

=== Misspending analysis ===
An analysis by the Maricopa County Office of Management and Budget, completed in April 2011, found that Arpaio had misspent almost $100 million over the previous 5 years.

The analysis showed that money from a restricted detention fund which could legally be used only to pay for jail items, such as food, detention officers' salaries, and equipment, was used to pay employees to patrol Maricopa County. The analysis also showed that many sheriff's office employees, whose salaries were paid from the restricted detention fund, were working job assignments different from those recorded in their personnel records. Arpaio's office kept a separate set of personnel books detailing actual work assignments, different from information kept in the county's official human resources records.

Arpaio used the detention fund to pay for investigations of political rivals, as well as activities involving his human-smuggling unit.

The analysis also showed a number of inappropriate spending items including a trip to Alaska where deputies stayed at a fishing resort, and trips to Disneyland.

Separate investigations by The Arizona Republic uncovered widespread abuse of public funds and county policies by Arpaio's office, including high-ranking employees routinely charging expensive meals and stays at luxury hotels on their county credit cards.

The Republic also found that a restricted jail-enhancement fund was improperly used to pay for out-of-state training, a staff party at a local amusement park, and a $456,000 bus which Arpaio purchased in violation of county procurement rules.

=== Misconduct and mismanagement memo ===
In September 2010, a 63-page internal memo written by Maricopa Deputy Chief Frank Munnell, was made public. The memo alleged years of misconduct and mismanagement by Arpaio's second-in-command and other top MCSO officers, including the use of a public-corruption task force to conduct politically motivated probes into political opponents. The memo alleged that top officials in the MCSO "willfully and intentionally committed criminal acts by attempting to obstruct justice, tamper with witnesses, and destroy evidence."

Arpaio forwarded the memo to the Pinal County Sheriff's Office, requesting they conduct an administrative investigation. Former top MCSO staffers claimed that Arpaio knew of the acts alleged in the Munnell memo, but took no action to stop them. Arpaio has not commented publicly on the allegations.

In October 2010, the U.S. Attorney for Arizona confirmed that the FBI and Department of Justice had received copies of the Munnell memo and were conducting criminal investigations into its allegations.

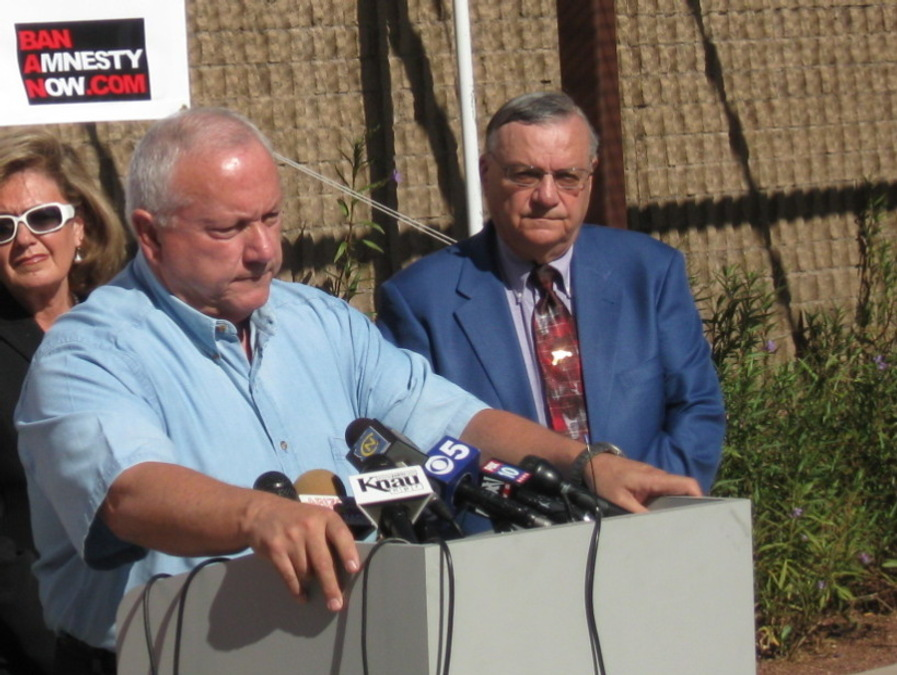
Arpaio with State Senator Russell Pearce in 2010

=== Wrongful arrest and entrapment lawsuit and settlement ===
In 1999, undercover MCSO deputies arrested James Saville, then 18 years old, and charged him with plotting to kill Arpaio with a pipe bomb. A local television station had been tipped off to the arrest by the MCSO, and broadcast footage of the arrest that evening. The MCSO held a news conference shortly after the arrest, and Arpaio appeared in interviews on local television stations, saying "If they think they are going to scare me away with bombs and everything else, it's not going to bother me."

In July 2003, after spending almost four years in jail awaiting trial, Saville was acquitted by a Maricopa County Superior Court jury. Jurors were persuaded that Saville had been entrapped by the MCSO as part of a publicity stunt by Arpaio. This was a rare example of a successful entrapment defense, which is very difficult to prove. Jurors interviewed following the trial said that "they were convinced that Saville had been a pawn in an elaborate media ploy." The jury forewoman subsequently said: "This was a publicity stunt at the expense of four years of someone's life." Another juror stated that "This was a big setup from the beginning."

In 2004, Saville, following the acquittal, sued Arpaio and Maricopa County for wrongful arrest and entrapment. In 2008, the suit was settled, with Maricopa County paying Saville $1.1 million. Saville also received an unspecified additional compensation from the county's insurance company.

=== Abuse-of-power allegations and investigation ===
In 2008, a federal grand jury began an inquiry of Arpaio for abuse-of-power in connection with an FBI investigation. In August 2012, the Arizona U.S. Attorney's office announced that it was "closing its investigation into allegations of criminal conduct" by Arpaio, without filing charges.

Arpaio was investigated for politically motivated and "bogus" prosecutions, which a former U.S. Attorney called "utterly unacceptable". Phoenix Mayor Phil Gordon called Arpaio's "long list" of questionable prosecutions "a reign of terror".

The targets of Arpaio's alleged abuse of power included:

- Phil Gordon, Phoenix Mayor
- Dan Saban, Arpaio's 2004 and 2008 opponent for the office of Sheriff of Maricopa County
- Terry Goddard, Arizona Attorney General
- David Smith, Maricopa County Manager
- The Maricopa County Board of Supervisors
- Barbara Mundell, Maricopa Superior Court Presiding Judge
- Anna Baca, former Maricopa Superior Court Presiding Judge
- Gary Donahoe, Maricopa Superior Court Criminal Presiding Judge
- Daniel Pochoda, ACLU attorney
- Sandra Dowling, former Maricopa County School Superintendent
- Mike Lacey, Editor, Phoenix New Times

As of July 2010, only Sandra Dowling had been successfully prosecuted. Indicted on 25 felony counts, Dowling eventually pleaded guilty to patronage for giving a summer job to her daughter, a single class-2 misdemeanor which was not among the original counts, although as part of the plea bargain she also agreed to recuse herself from the Maricopa County Regional School District. Dowling later filed suit, alleging negligence, malicious prosecution, abuse of process and several constitutional violations, although Arpaio won summary judgment against her claims.

As of December 2011, a federal grand jury was investigating Arpaio's office on criminal abuse-of-power allegations since at least December 2009 and was specifically examining the investigative work of the sheriff's anti-public corruption squad.

On August 31, 2012, federal authorities announced they were terminating their abuse-of-power investigation into Arpaio in Arizona without filing charges against him.

=== Immigration patrols ===
In 2005, Arpaio began focusing on enforcing immigration laws, after Maricopa County Attorney Andrew Thomas was elected with a campaign slogan of "Stop illegal immigration." Arpaio stated that prior to 2005, he didn't view illegal immigration as a "serious legal issue."

Starting in 2005, Arpaio regularly conducted saturation patrols and immigration sweeps, targeting Latino neighborhoods and day laborers. Arpaio also ran many operations targeting businesses employing Latinos, and arresting employees who were unauthorized immigrants for identity theft. According to Arpaio, 100% of the persons arrested for using stolen IDs in 57 raids conducted up until March 2012 were in the country illegally. Until 2011, when a Federal District Court injunction halted the practice, Arpaio maintained an immigrant smuggling squad which illegally stopped cars with Latino drivers or passengers to check their immigration status.

Arpaio has said of his immigration law enforcement efforts, "Ours is an operation where we want to go after illegals, not the crime first... It's a pure program. You go after them, and you lock them up."

== Federal class-action suit ==
As of September 2012, Arpaio was a defendant in a federal class action suit and a United States Department of Justice suit, both of which alleged racial profiling.

Arpaio repeatedly denied racial profiling, although the MCSO did not have a policy specifically barring the practice nor any reliable internal method of ensuring it was not taking place.

In 2007 Manuel De Jesus Ortega Melendres, a Mexican tourist who was a passenger in a car stopped in Cave Creek, Maricopa County, filed a lawsuit (Melendres v. Arpaio) in the United States District Court for the District of Arizona against Sheriff Arpaio, the MCSO, and Maricopa County, claiming to have been detained unlawfully for nine hours as a result of racial profiling. The lawsuit was expanded when several individuals joined in with similar complaints.

The plaintiffs were represented by the American Civil Liberties Union (ACLU), the Mexican-American Legal Defense and Education Fund (MALDEF), and the law firm of Covington & Burling.

The lawsuit charged that Sheriff Arpaio and the MCSO unlawfully instituted a pattern and practice of targeting Latino drivers and passengers in Maricopa County during traffic stops, and that MCSO's practices discriminated on the basis of race in violation of the Equal Protection Clause of the Fourteenth Amendment, and resulted in prolonged traffic stops and baseless extended detentions in violation of the Fourth Amendment.

The case was initially assigned to U.S. District Judge Mary Murguia. In June 2009, in response to a motion filed by Arpaio's lawyers, she recused herself. The case was then assigned to U.S. District Judge G. Murray Snow.

In his September 2009 deposition in the case, Arpaio testified he had never read the complaint in the case, was unfamiliar with the details of the allegations of racial profiling therein, didn't know the content of the 14th Amendment to the U.S. Constitution, and had never read the Department of Justice's guidelines concerning the use of race in investigations, which would have applied to his deputies in the field when they were still operating under a 287(g) program agreement with U.S. Immigration and Customs Enforcement (ICE). He insisted, however, that his deputies didn't profile based on ethnicity or race.

In a December 2011 order, Judge Snow sanctioned Arpaio and the MCSO for acknowledged destruction of records in the case. Judge Snow also stated:

Sheriff Arpaio has made public statements that a fact finder could interpret as endorsing racial profiling, such as stating that, even lacking 287(g) authority, his officers can detain people based upon 'their speech, what they look like, if they look like they came from another country'... Moreover, he acknowledges that MCSO provides no training to reduce the risk of racial profiling, stating 'if we do not racial profile, why would I do a training program?'" Judge Snow expanded the complaint into a class-action lawsuit, including all Latino drivers stopped by the Sheriff's Office since 2007, or who will be stopped in the future. He also enjoined the MCSO and all of its officers from "detaining any person based only on knowledge or reasonable belief, without more, that the person is unlawfully present within the United States, because as a matter of law such knowledge does not amount to a reasonable belief that the person either violated or conspired to violate the Arizona human smuggling statute, or any other state or federal criminal law.

== Melendres v. Arpaio racial profiling class-action lawsuit ==
On December 23, 2011, U.S. District Court Judge G. Murray Snow enjoined Arpaio and the MCSO from "detaining any person based only on knowledge or reasonable belief, without more, that the person is unlawfully present within the United States," halting anti-illegal immigration enforcement by MCSO in its current form.

Arpaio filed an appeal with the United States Court of Appeals for the Ninth Circuit. The court upheld Judge Snow's injunction.

Starting July 19, 2012, a six-day bench trial was held before Judge Snow. On May 24, 2013, Judge Snow issued a decision finding the policies and practices of Arpaio and his office discriminatory, in violation of the Fourth and Fourteenth Amendments and Title VI of the Civil Rights Act of 1964.

In June 2013, the United States Department of Justice (DOJ) filed a Statement of Interest in the case, recommending the appointment of an "independent monitor to assess and report on MCSO's compliance with the remedial measures ordered by the Court." Adopting the DOJ's recommendation, in August 2013 Judge Snow stated in a court hearing that he would be assigning an independent monitor.

In October 2013, Judge Snow issued a 59-page final order, giving the MCSO a list of reforms and requirements to institute and follow. In January 2014, Judge Snow appointed Robert Warshaw, former Rochester, New York, police chief, to act as monitor over the MCSO.

Arpaio filed a limited appeal to the United States Court of Appeals for the Ninth Circuit, contesting the district court's order, insofar as it covered traffic stops outside of saturation patrols. The appeals court rejected this claim, upholding Judge Snow's inclusion of non-saturation patrols in his finding of racial profiling, and maintaining his rulings of corrective actions that included training and video recording of traffic stops. The appeals court did agree with Arpaio that the court-appointed monitor's oversight of internal investigations must only be related to the constitutional violations.

Subsequent to Judge Snow's October 2013 order, Arpaio was videotaped during a training session for MCSO deputies, saying "we don't racially profile. I don't care what everybody says." As a result of this, and mischaracterizations of the court's order by MCSO Chief Deputy Jerry Sheridan, Snow convened a hearing in March 2014 where he chastised Arpaio and Sheridan, saying they had "defied and even mocked his order to stop singling out Latinos during routine patrols, traffic stops and workplace raids." He then ordered Arpaio's attorney to prepare a corrective letter setting the record straight, to be distributed to all MCSO deputies. Because of Arpaio's First Amendment free speech rights, the court did not require him to personally sign the corrective letter.

Two days after the hearing, having just been rebuked for mocking the court's order, Arpaio sent out a fundraising letter complaining of "Rampant UNFOUNDED [sic] charges of racism and racial profiling in my office." Judge Snow responded to this fundraising letter, stating:

I want to be careful and say that the Maricopa County Sheriff's Office has used race – has illegitimately used race as a factor, and to the extent that constitutes racial profiling, that's what it is and that's what I found and the sheriff is saying that people have wrongfully accused him of that as of last Wednesday, which was after the meeting in which he was here. So to the extent that I have a sheriff, who I'm not going to prohibit from mischaracterizing my order publicly, to the extent that I have an MCSO that is rife with a misunderstanding of my order and a mischaracterization of it when they are the people that have to understand it and implement it, I have grave concerns...

On September 11, 2014, Judge Snow granted more than $4.4 million in attorney's fees to four legal organizations that litigated Melendres v. Arpaio. Attorney's fees were granted to the ACLU Immigrants' Rights Project, the ACLU of Arizona, MALDEF, and Covington & Burling.

On June 4, 2014, the Phoenix New Times reported that Arpaio had initiated a criminal investigation of Judge Snow as well as the DOJ. The article quoted unnamed sources, including a former detective with the MCSO's Special Investigations Division, who claimed that the investigation was being run directly by Arpaio and was based on his belief that Judge Snow and the DOJ had engaged in a conspiracy against him.

Arpaio neither confirmed nor denied the investigation to the Phoenix New Times. However, in an April 2015 civil contempt hearing before Judge Snow, Arpaio testified that his attorney, Tim Casey, had hired a private investigator to investigate Judge Snow's wife, and that the MCSO had paid Dennis L. Montgomery to investigate whether the DOJ had been penetrating Arpaio's e-mails as well as those of local attorneys and judges, including Judge Snow. (This was called the "Seattle Operation.") Subsequently, MCSO Chief Deputy Jerry Sheridan testified that there was no investigation into Snow, his wife, or his family. As a result of the potential for ethical conflicts arising from Arpaio's and Sheridan's testimony, Casey withdrew as legal counsel for Arpaio and the MCSO.

During a status conference on May 14, 2015, Judge Snow, reading from a prepared statement, said that documents unearthed from the "Seattle Operation" by the court-appointed monitor revealed "an attempt to construct a conspiracy involving this court" as well as other entities and individuals including the DOJ, former U.S. Attorney General Eric Holder, former Phoenix Mayor Phil Gordon, and former MCSO Executive Chief Brian Sands, among others. One week after this status conference, Arpaio's criminal defense attorney filed a motion to disqualify Judge Snow, claiming that he had moved from being an independent arbiter in the case into the role of investigating "issues involving his own family." Judge Snow temporarily halted further hearings in the case, but ultimately denied the motion and resumed holding hearings. On August 7, 2015, Arpaio asked the Ninth Circuit to remove Judge Snow from the case. On September 15, 2015, the Ninth Circuit denied Arpaio's request to remove Judge Snow, as well as Arpaio's related request to halt the lower court's proceedings.

As part of the contempt proceedings, Judge Snow concluded Arpaio and others had made intentionally false statements about the efforts to investigate him.

== Litigation on jail conditions ==
=== Graves v. Arpaio: federal court finding of unconstitutional jail conditions ===
Federal Judge Neil V. Wake ruled in 2008, and again in 2010, that the county jails violated the constitutional rights of inmates in medical and other care-related issues. This ruling was a result of a lawsuit brought by the ACLU which alleged that "Arpaio routinely abused pre-trial detainees at Maricopa County Jail by feeding them moldy bread, rotten fruit and other contaminated food, housing them in cells so hot as to endanger their health, denying them care for serious medical and mental health needs, and keeping them packed as tightly as sardines in holding cells for days at a time during intake."

In a ruling issued in October 2010, the U.S. Court of Appeals for the Ninth Circuit ordered Arpaio to comply with Judge Wake's 2008 ruling, which required Arpaio to end the overcrowding and to ensure all detainees received necessary medical and mental health care; be given uninterrupted access to all medications prescribed by correctional medical staff; be given access to exercise and to sinks, toilets, toilet paper and soap; and be served food that met or exceeded the U.S. Department of Agriculture's dietary guidelines.

=== Braillard v. Maricopa County: wrongful death suit and settlement ===
In 2005, Deborah Braillard, a diabetic, was arrested and detained in county jail on a minor drug-possession charge. Without medical attention, Braillard soon became ill. Although Braillard "groaned and cried for help as she defecated and vomited on herself and others," guards refused to listen to pleas to medical treatment for Braillard, who went into a diabetic coma and died while chained to a hospital bed.

In the subsequent wrongful death of Braillard v. Maricopa County, the plaintiff's attorney cited numerous reports commissioned and paid for by Maricopa County, dating back as far as 1996, detailing a "culture of cruelty" where inmates were routinely denied humane healthcare at Maricopa County jails run by Arpaio. Testifying in this case, Arpaio stated he could not deny making the statement that even if he had a billion dollars he wouldn't change the way he runs his jails. Arpaio said his jails were meant as places for punishment, and that the inhabitants were all criminals, although in fact most inmates had not been convicted of a crime and were awaiting trial.

In the litigation, the former medical director for the country jails and other witnesses testified on the destruction of evidence, specifically "about evidence in the case being swiped and deleted from his computer." In 2012, after the judge assigned to the case "that the jury was to be told about the MCSO's coverup, including missing jail videos and recordings of Braillard's phone calls," the county settled the litigation for $3.25 million. The county spent an additional $1.8 million in legal fees on the Braillard case.

== Justice Department investigation on racial profiling ==
In June 2008, the Department of Justice Civil Rights Division began an investigation of Arpaio amid accusations of discrimination and unconstitutional searches and seizures. The investigation was conducted under the authority of Title VI of the Civil Rights Act of 1964, which forbids discrimination related to programs that receive federal funds.

On July 7, 2009, Arpaio held a press conference and announced that he would not cooperate with the investigation, either by providing documents or permitting interviews with personnel. On September 2, 2010, the Department of Justice filed suit against Arpaio to compel his cooperation with the investigation. A spokeswoman for the Justice Department stated that it was unprecedented for an agency to refuse to cooperate with a Title VI investigation, and that this was the first time the Justice Department had sued to compel access to documents and facilities. The suit was settled in June 2011, after Arpaio allowed federal officials to interview Sheriff's office employees and review hundreds of thousands of documents for the investigation.

On December 15, 2011, the Justice Department released their findings after a 3-year investigation of Arpaio's office amid complaints of racial profiling and a culture of bias at the agency's top level. The report stated that under Arpaio, the Maricopa County Sheriff's Office has "a pervasive culture of discriminatory bias against Latinos" that "reaches the highest levels of the agency."

The Justice Department accused Arpaio of engaging in "unconstitutional policing" by unfairly targeting Latinos for detention and arrest, and retaliating against critics. In the report, a Justice Department expert concluded that Arpaio oversaw the worst pattern of racial profiling in U.S. history.

Based on the Justice Department report on discriminatory policing practices within the MCSO, on December 15, 2011, the United States Department of Homeland Security removed the MCSO from the 287(g) program. This decision revoked the MCSO's federal authority to identify and detain illegal immigrants.

=== United States v. Maricopa County ===
On May 10, 2012, the United States Department of Justice (DOJ) in United States v. Maricopa County, et al (Case number 2:12-cv-981), filed suit against Arpaio, the MCSO, and Maricopa County, alleging that "The Maricopa County Sheriff's Office (MCSO) and Sheriff Joseph M. Arpaio have engaged and continue to engage in a pattern or practice of unlawful discriminatory police conduct directed at Latinos in Maricopa County and jail practices that unlawfully discriminate against Latino prisoners with limited English language skills." The complaint included accusations that Arpaio and his staff forced women to sleep in their own menstrual blood, assaulted pregnant women, ignored rape, and criminalized being a Latino.

The United States' claims in this suit encompassed, but were broader than, the unconstitutional discriminatory conduct that the Court in Melendres v. Arpaio found the MCSO to have engaged in concerning its immigration enforcement-related traffic stops.

A DOJ representative said that the agency was left with no choice but to file suit after Arpaio's attorneys balked at a demand for a court-appointed monitor to ensure the sheriff's office complied with any settlement terms. Arpaio rejected the notion of a court-appointed monitor, and denied that the MCSO engaged in racial profiling.

On June 15, 2015, Senior United States District Judge Roslyn O. Silver of the United States District Court for the District of Arizona entered partial summary judgment for the DOJ, and against Arpaio, on the central racial-profiling allegations in the suit. On July 15, Maricopa County's board of supervisors voted to settle the lawsuit. The partial settlement, however, did not resolve the claims of discriminatory policing.

== Birther movement ==
At two press conferences held in March 2012, Arpaio and members of his Cold Case Posse claimed that President Barack Obama's long-form birth certificate, released by the White House on April 27, 2011, is a computer-generated forgery. The Posse also claimed that Obama's Selective Service card was a forgery. The allegations regarding the birth certificate were repeated at a July 2012 news conference in which Arpaio stated that Obama's long-form birth certificate was "definitely fraudulent."

Some of the major claims presented by Arpaio were subsequently shown to be false; specifically, the 1961 Vital Statistics Instruction Manual that Arpaio and his team claimed to possess contradicted what they claimed it said, and images shown by them, purportedly from that manual, were instead from computer specifications dated 1968 and 1969.

In response to Arpaio's claims, Joshua A. Wisch, a special assistant to the Attorney General of Hawaii, said in a statement, "President Obama was born in Honolulu, and his birth certificate is valid. Regarding the latest allegations from a sheriff in Arizona, they are untrue, misinformed and misconstrue Hawaii law." Arizona state officials, including Governor Jan Brewer and Secretary of State Ken Bennett, also dismissed Arpaio's objections and accepted the validity of Obama's birth certificate. Brewer also stated that Obama's mother's U.S. citizenship made him a citizen by jus sanguinis, regardless of where he was born.

During September 2016, Arpaio claimed to be still investigating President Obama's birth certificate, stating, "We are looking at a forged document. Period." On December 15, 2016, Arpaio held a news conference along with posse member Mike Zullo, detailing "9 points of forgery" supposedly found on the digital image of Obama's birth certificate.

In 2007, Arpaio said that it was an "honor" for his department to be compared to the Ku Klux Klan, a white supremacist terrorist organization. On the witness stand in a civil trial in 2012, however, Arpaio backtracked, saying that he no longer considered the comparison an honor.

== Conviction for contempt of court and presidential pardon ==
=== Contempt of court ===
In December 2014, after many warnings, U.S. District Judge G. Murray Snow told Arpaio there was a very real possibility that he would refer Arpaio to the U.S. Attorney's Office for criminal prosecution on contempt of court charges due to the MCSO's failure to comply with the court's order to stop its racial profiling practices. Snow advised Arpaio to retain a criminal defense attorney. In a bid to shield Arpaio from criminal proceedings, his attorneys filed a written statement arguing that any mistakes in complying with the court's orders were unintentional, or the fault of former employees. Judge Snow found Arpaio's arguments unavailing, and, in January 2015, announced that Arpaio would face a contempt hearing in April 2015 for violating court orders in Melendres v. Arpaio.

In March 2015, a month before the scheduled contempt hearing, Arpaio admitted that he violated several court orders, and consented to a finding of civil contempt against him. Because the matter of criminal contempt was still at issue, the initial contempt hearing was held as scheduled.

On July 24, 2015, the court directed U.S. marshals to seize evidence, which was possibly related to the contempt of court charges and was slated for destruction, from the sheriff's office.

On May 13, 2016, the court held Arpaio in contempt on three counts. On August 19, 2016, the court asked the federal government to file criminal contempt charges against Arpaio and some of his subordinates over his failure to follow the court's instructions. On October 11, 2016, federal prosecutors announced that they would press criminal contempt of court charges against Arpaio. On October 25, 2016, such charges were officially filed, though Arpaio would not be arrested and no mugshot would be taken. The charges were filed just two weeks before an election in which Arpaio was running for re-election.

On July 31, 2017, Arpaio was found guilty of criminal contempt of court. U.S. District Judge Susan Bolton wrote that Arpaio had "willfully violated an order of the court" by failing "to ensure his subordinates' compliance and by directing them to continue to detain persons for whom no criminal charges could be filed." Arpaio was scheduled to be sentenced in October 2017.

=== Presidential pardon ===
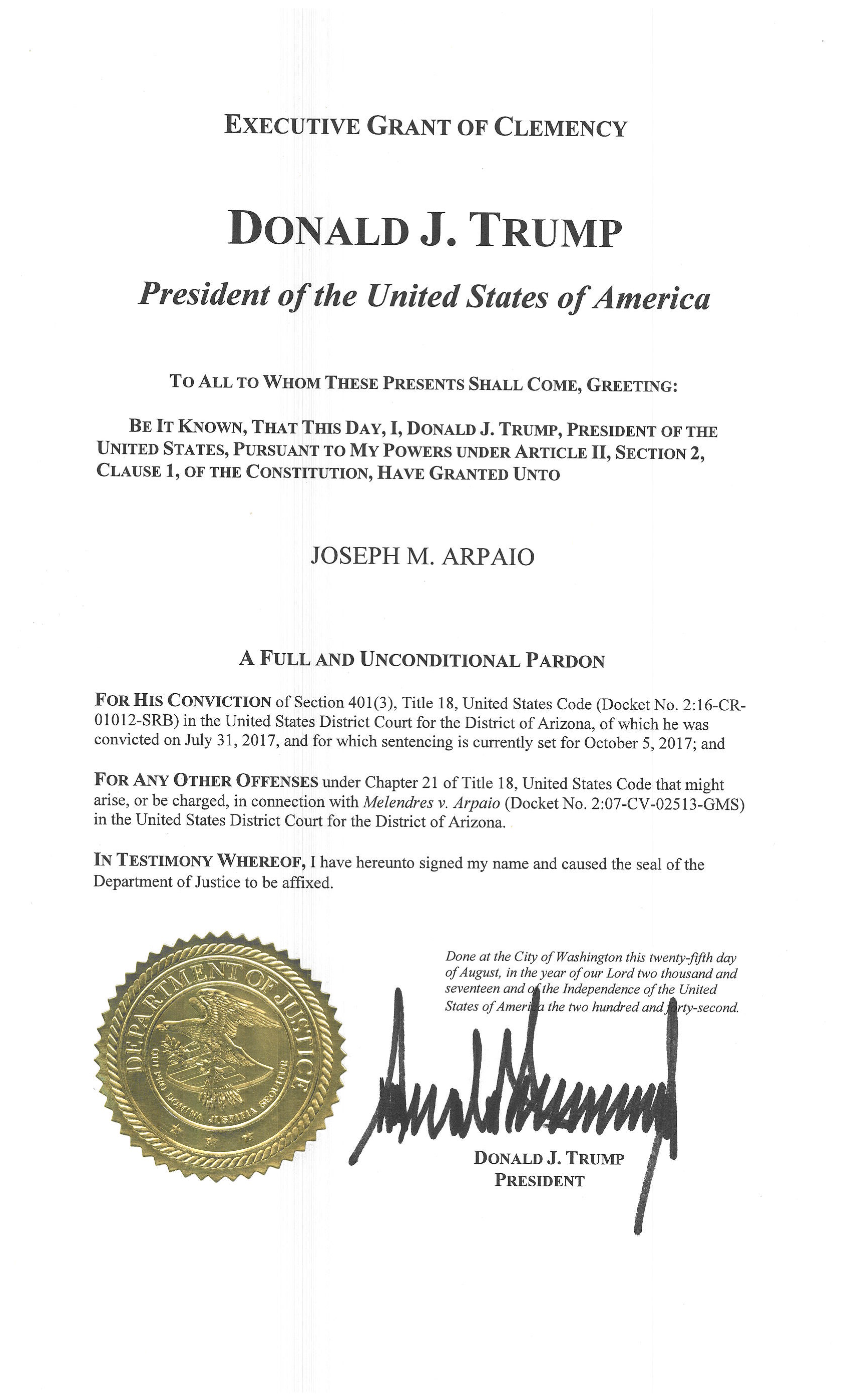
President Trump's full pardon of Joe Arpaio

On August 25, 2017, President Donald Trump pardoned Arpaio for his conviction for criminal contempt of court, a decision that provoked considerable controversy. The pardon covers Arpaio's conviction and "any other offenses under Chapter 21 of Title 18, United States Code that might arise, or be charged, in connection with Melendres v. Arpaio."

Trump also announced his decision on Twitter, declaring that Arpaio is an "American patriot" who had "kept Arizona safe." Arpaio expressed his thanks to the President in a series of tweets and to his "loyal supporters." Arpaio also declared that his conviction was "a political witch hunt by holdovers in the Obama justice department!" The Washington Post fact-checker gave the claim "Four Pinocchios" (its worst rating), noting that Arpaio was convicted by two federal judges: a Bush-appointed federal judge, and a federal judge respected by both Republicans and Democrats. Attorneys for Arpaio have stated that they are moving for his case to be dismissed in light of the pardon.

==== Reactions to pardon ====
Arizona Governor Doug Ducey was among the politicians praising the pardon, crediting Arpaio with helping to reduce crime over a long career, and Ducey also welcomed the finality that the pardon gave to the whole matter. The pardon was strongly criticized by Arizona Senator and 2008 Republican presidential candidate John McCain as Arpaio had expressed no remorse for his actions. Arizona Senator Jeff Flake and House Speaker and 2012 Republican vice-presidential candidate Paul Ryan signaled their opposition to the pardon.

A number of law professors and political scientists described the pardon as troubling and unusual. Several experts on authoritarianism described the pardon as illiberal and said that it undermined the rule of law.

==== Subsequent proceedings ====
After the pardon, Arpaio filed a motion to vacate his conviction for criminal contempt. District judge Susan R. Bolton denied the motion. She held that Trump's pardon "undoubtedly spared Defendant from any punishment that might otherwise have been imposed. It did not, however, 'revise the historical facts' of this case." Arpaio's attorneys said that he would probably appeal to the United States Court of Appeals for the Ninth Circuit. One of the American Civil Liberties Union attorneys who had represented the plaintiffs in the underlying racial-profiling case agreed with the denial of Arpaio's motion, stating, "The court made detailed findings after a bench trial about Joe Arpaio's criminal conduct. The court's findings and documents in the record of the case should stand and now will stand."

The legal status of the pardon continued to be challenged. Although the federal prosecutors did not contest its validity, some legal groups challenged the pardon as unconstitutional.

In 2018, Arpaio sued The New York Times, the HuffPost, Rolling Stone, and CNN, alleging that their analyses of Arpaio's proceedings had defamed him. These suits were dismissed by a federal judge, who ruled that Arpaio failed to prove actual malice.

In 2020, the 9th Circuit Court of Appeals rejected Arpaio's attempt to vacate his guilty verdict, finding that the verdict no longer has any legal consequences. Arpaio said he still considered this a victory as ensuring there was no legal consequences was what he desired from his attempt to vacate the verdict.

== Election results ==
=== 2000 ===
2000 Maricopa County Sheriff's Office election, Arizona
Party	Candidate	Votes	%	±%
Republican	Joe Arpaio (incumbent)	572,063	66.5	n/a
Democratic	Robert Ayala	227,055	26.4	n/a
Independent	Tom Bearup	60,401	7.0	n/a
n/a	Write-in candidate	825	0.1	n/a
Majority		345,008	40.1	n/a
Turnout		860,344		
Republican hold		Swing		

=== 2004 ===
2004 Maricopa County Sheriff's Office election, Arizona
Party	Candidate	Votes	%	±%
Republican	Joe Arpaio (incumbent)	642,923	56.7	−9.8
Democratic	Robert Ayala	347,981	30.7	+4.3
n/a	Steven W. Martin	142,296	12.6	n/a
Majority		294,942	26.0	−14.1
Turnout		1,133,200		+31.7
Republican hold		Swing		

=== 2008 ===
2008 Maricopa County Sheriff's Office election, Arizona
Party	Candidate	Votes	%	±%
Republican	Joe Arpaio (incumbent)	730,426	55.2	−1.5
Democratic	Dan Saban	558,176	42.2	+11.5
Libertarian	Chris A.H. Will	35,425	2.7	n/a
Majority		172,250	13.0	−13.0
Turnout		1,324,027		+16.8
Republican hold		Swing		

=== 2012 ===
2012 Maricopa County Sheriff's Office election, Arizona
Party	Candidate	Votes	%	±%
Republican	Joe Arpaio (incumbent)	679,967	50.7%	−4.5%
Democratic	Paul Penzone	599,328	44.7%	+2.5%
Independent	Mike Stauffer	61,973	4.6%	n/a
Majority		80,639	6.0%	−7.0%
Turnout		1,342,221		+1.4%
Republican hold		Swing		

=== 2016 ===
2016 Maricopa County Sheriff's Office election, Arizona
Party	Candidate	Votes	%	±%
Democratic	Paul Penzone	861,757	56.3%	+11.6%
Republican	Joe Arpaio (incumbent)	665,581	43.5%	−7.2%
Majority		196,176	12.8%	
Turnout		1,530,887		+14.1%
Democratic gain from Republican				

=== Failed recall petitions, 2007 and 2013 ===
In November 2007, a group calling itself Arizonans for the U.S. Constitution and Recall of Joe Arpaio filed the paperwork to begin an effort to recall Arpaio and County Prosecutor Thomas from office for allegedly disobeying and violating the United States Constitution and abuse of power. Their petition to get a recall question for the two officials onto the next general election ballot failed when the group was unable to collect the more than 200,000 registered voter signatures required. In a survey taken by the Walter Cronkite School of Journalism and Mass Communication, while the petition was in circulation, nearly three out of four respondents opposed the recall, and 65 percent of the respondents held a positive opinion of Arpaio.

On May 30, 2013, a recall attempt on Arpaio again failed only a week after a federal judge ruled that the sheriff's office had engaged in systematic discrimination against Latinos in violation of their constitutional rights. Members of Respect Arizona and Citizens for a Better Arizona started the recall effort, but were unable to get the required 335,000 valid voter signatures by the 5 p.m. deadline.

== Campaigns for other public offices ==
=== 2018 U.S. Senate election ===
Arpaio stated in a September 2017 interview with American Free Press that he would consider running for office again, including the United States Congress, if President Donald Trump asked him to. In January 2018, Arpaio announced his intention to seek the Republican nomination for the U.S. Senate in 2018. He faced Martha McSally and Kelli Ward in the August 28, 2018, Republican primary. Arpaio was defeated, receiving 19% of the vote to McSally's 52% and Ward's 28%.

=== 2020 Maricopa County Sheriff election ===
On August 25, 2019, Arpaio issued a statement saying that he would run for Sheriff of Maricopa County in 2020, saying "Watch out world! We are back!" and promising to reinstitute the severe prison conditions he imposed in the past. He lost the primary election to his former right-hand man, Jerry Sheridan.

=== 2022 Fountain Hills mayoral election ===
Arpaio announced his candidacy for mayor of Fountain Hills, Arizona, on October 5, 2021. This followed comments made in September about running for the office. In the election on August 2, 2022, he failed to oust the incumbent Ginny Dickey, receiving 5,207 votes (49.0%).

=== 2024 Fountain Hills mayoral election ===
In 2024, Arpaio again ran to be the mayor of Fountain Hills. He lost in the primary election, receiving 1,527 votes to incumbent Ginny Dickey's 4,507 and Gerry Friedel's 4,061.

== Personal life ==
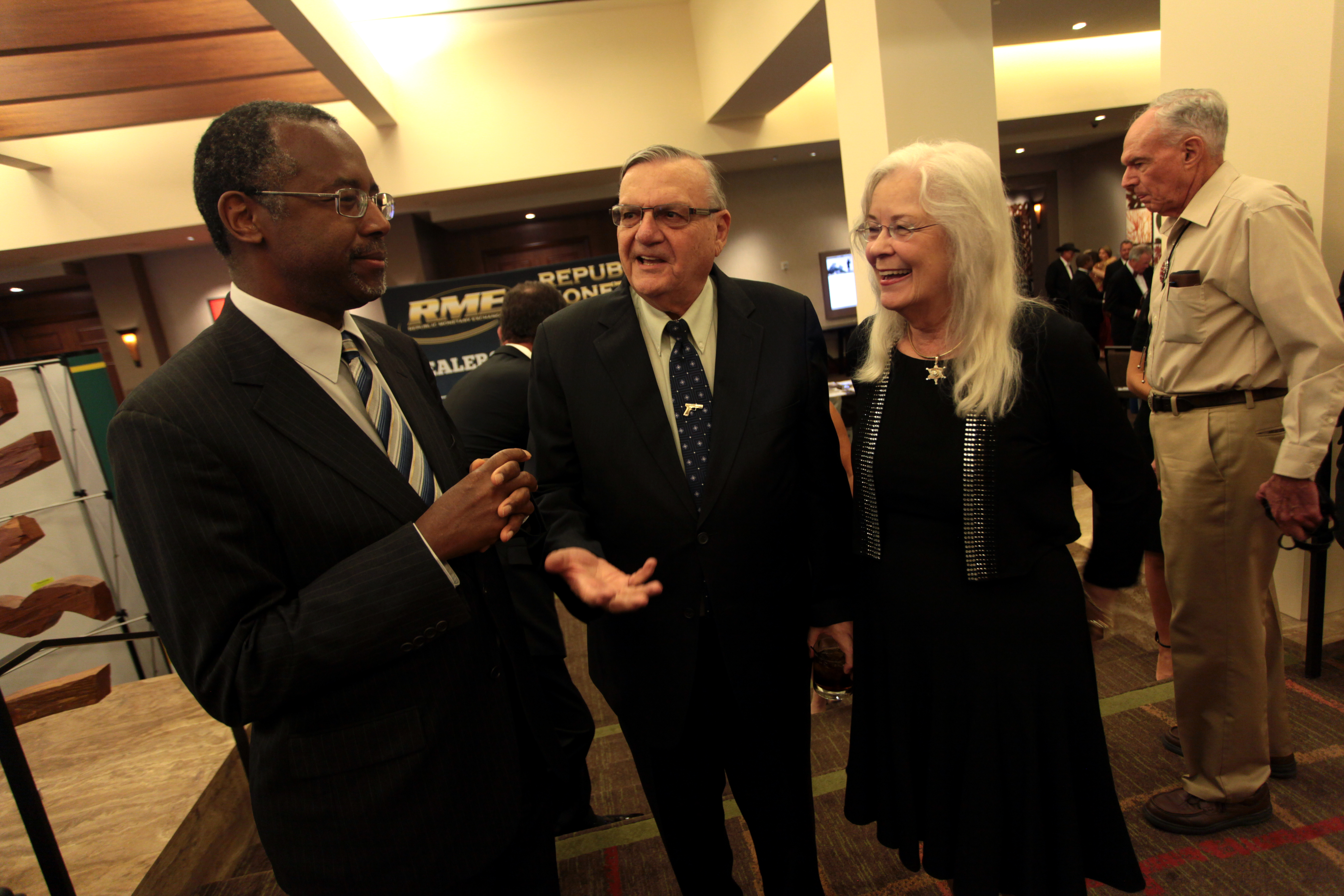
Joe and Ava Arpaio speaking with Ben Carson in September 2014

Arpaio married his wife Ava in 1958 and they had two children. In 2021, Ava died of cancer complications. As of 2008, he lived in Fountain Hills, Arizona.

== Works ==
- Arpaio, Joe; Sherman, Len (1996). America's Toughest Sheriff: How to Win the War Against Crime. New York City: Summit Publishing Group. p. 262. ISBN 1-56530-202-8. "america's toughest sheriff."
- Arpaio, Joe; Sherman, Len (2008). Joe's Law: America's Toughest Sheriff Takes on Illegal Immigration, Drugs and Everything Else That Threatens America. New York City: AMACOM Div American Mgmt Assn. p. 272. ISBN 978-0-8144-0199-6. "joe's law."

== See also ==
- List of people granted executive clemency in the first Trump presidency

Civic offices
Preceded by Tom Agnos	Sheriff of Maricopa County; 1993–2016	Succeeded by Paul Penzone
