= ODIS =

Web based record management software

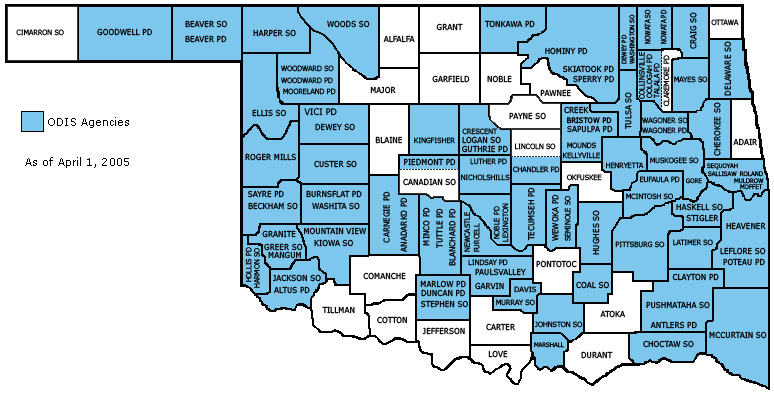
The 101 agencies in Oklahoma using ODIS, as of April 2005.

ODIS, or the Offender Data Information System is a web based, computerized records management software application to improve the capture, maintenance and quality of law enforcement data that is capable of running in any combination of centralized or decentralized network environments. It is designed using Microsoft's DNA (Distributed interNetwork Architecture) programming model, constructed using three tiers: database for storage, compiled application components to handle the business logic and the presentation layer which is what the user see.

The ODIS application addresses the problem of having many applications for many tasks, by using one common interface that is accessible over a network to all departments in an agency. The core of the application includes the National Incident-Based Reporting System (NIBRS) module, which is designed to replace Uniform Crime Reporting (UCR) and strictly adheres to the reporting standards of the federal government and the Oklahoma State Bureau of Investigation (OSBI). The ODIS application also allows the entry of digital images of individuals, scars, marks and tattoos. An entire history of a person's involvement with the agency - whether it be for a booking, arrest, citation, warrant, missing person, owner of a piece of stolen property, etc. - can be viewed after conducting a general search. Integration of these different program elements has made the ODIS application a powerful record-keeping and investigative tool for agencies that use it to its fullest capacity.

ODIS integrates the following:

- A CAD and radio log
- A jail management system
- A party information database
- A sexual offender database
- An active and inactive arrest warrant list
- Property room management system
- A case management system
- A citation database
- A list of Oklahoma state statutes
- A user-programmable list of Local city/town ordinances
