= Big Boy (film) =

1930 film

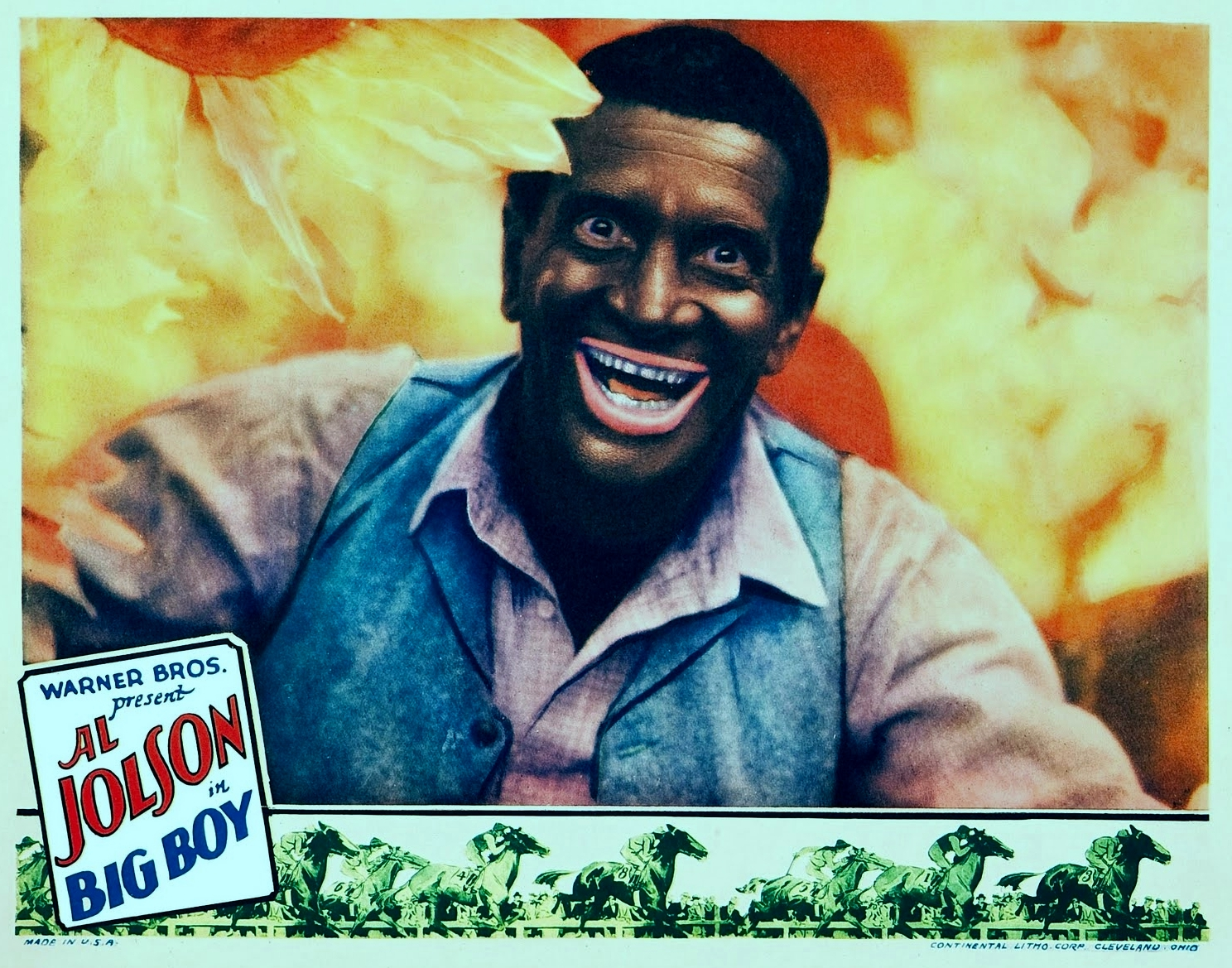
- Directed by: Alan Crosland
- Written by: William K. Wells; Rex Taylor based on a musical comedy by Harold Atteridge
- Starring: Al Jolson; Claudia Dell; Louise Closser Hale; Noah Beery
- Cinematography: Hal Mohr
- Edited by: Ralph Dawson
- Music by: Rex Dunn; Alois Reiser; Sam H. Stept; Bud Green
- Distributed by: Warner Bros. Pictures
- Release date: September 11, 1930
- Running time: 68 minutes
- Country: United States
- Language: English
- Budget: $574,000
- Box office: $498,000

Big Boy is a 1930 American pre-Code musical comedy film produced by Warner Bros. Pictures. The film was directed by Alan Crosland and stars Al Jolson, Claudia Dell, Louise Closser Hale, and Noah Beery. The film is based on the 1925 Broadway hit show of the same name in which Jolson also starred.

== Plot ==
Big Boy (1930)

Gus is a loyal stable boy and jockey for a rich family in the South that has been interested in horse racing and breeding horses for generations. (In a flashback to 1870, we see Gus's grandfather working for the same family.) The young heir of the family, Jack, loses a lot of money by gambling and is blackmailed by his creditors for forging a check. They persuade Jack to ask his mother to replace Gus with another jockey for the family's racehorse, Big Boy, but she refuses. They frame Gus for tampering with the horse and he is discharged, replaced by a jockey who has been bought off to lose on purpose. Gus finds work as a waiter in a fancy restaurant, where he uncovers the details about the race throwing plot. With Jack's help, he outsmarts the crooks just in time to ride Big Boy to victory.

== Cast ==
- Al Jolson as Gus
- Claudia Dell as Annabel
- Louise Closser Hale as Mother
- Lloyd Hughes as Jack
- Eddie Phillips as Coley Reed
- Noah Beery as Bagby

== Songs ==
- "Little Sunshine"
- "Tomorrow Is Another Day"
- "Liza Lee"
- "Hooray for Baby and Me"

== Box office ==
According to Warner Bros records the film earned $437,000 domestically and $61,000 foreign.

== Preservation ==
Because of the public apathy to musicals at the time of its release, some of the musical sequences were cut from the picture before release and it was advertised strictly as a comedy picture. This domestic release print survives complete and has been released by Warner Archive on DVD. The film may have been released in a longer version outside the United States where there was never any backlash against musicals. It is unknown whether a copy of this full musical version still exists.

== See also ==
- List of films about horses
- List of films about horse racing
