= Uniform Crime Reports =

Federal Bureau of Investigation program in the United States

Uniform Crime Reporting
- Active: 1929 - present
- Country: United States
- Agency: Federal Bureau of Investigation
- Type: Crime statistics program
- Role: Collection and publishing
- Part of: Criminal Justice Information Services Division
- Abbreviation: UCR

Website
- Official website

The Uniform Crime Reporting (UCR) program compiles official data on crime in the United States, published by the Federal Bureau of Investigation (FBI). UCR is "a nationwide, cooperative statistical effort of nearly 18,000 city, university and college, county, state, tribal, and federal law enforcement agencies voluntarily reporting data on crimes brought to their attention".

Crime statistics are compiled from UCR data and published annually by the FBI in the Crime in the United States series. The FBI does not collect the data itself. Rather, law enforcement agencies across the United States provide the data to the FBI, which then compiles the Reports.

The Uniform Crime Reporting program began in 1929, and since then has become an important source of crime information for law enforcement, policymakers, scholars, and the media.

== History ==
=== Formation by the IACP & SSRC and Initial Reports (1927-1930) ===
The UCR Program was based upon work by the International Association of Chiefs of Police (IACP) and the Social Science Research Council (SSRC) throughout the 1920s to create a uniform national set of crime statistics, reliable for analysis. In 1927, the IACP created the Committee on Uniform Crime Reporting to determine statistics for national comparisons. The committee concluded that eight index crimes were fundamental to comparing crime rates across geographic locations: murder and non-negligent manslaughter, negligent manslaughter, forcible rape, robbery, aggravated assault, burglary, larceny-theft, and motor vehicle theft. (From 1930 to 1957, negligent manslaughter was included as an index crime. In 1979, arson would be added as an index crime by a congressional directive.)

The early program was managed by the IACP and published through a monthly report. The first report in January 1930 reported data from 400 cities throughout 43 states, covering more than 20 million individuals, approximately twenty percent of the total U.S. population at the time.

=== Transition to Oversight by the FBI (1930) ===
The intention of the IACP in developing the UCR program was always to have its management transferred to the Federal Bureau of Investigation (FBI). Through IACP lobbying, on June 11, 1930, the United States Congress passed legislation enacting 28 U.S.C. § 534, which granted the office of the Attorney General the ability to "acquire, collect, classify, and preserve identification, criminal identification, crime, and other records" and the ability to appoint officials to oversee this duty, including the subordinate members of the Bureau of Investigation. The Attorney General, in turn, designated the FBI to serve as the national clearinghouse for the data collected, and the FBI assumed responsibility for managing the UCR Program in September 1930. In the July 1930 issue of the crime report the IACP announced the FBI's takeover of the program. While the IACP discontinued oversight of the program, they continued to advise the FBI on how to better the UCR.

Since 1935, the FBI served as a data clearinghouse, organizing, collecting, and disseminating information voluntarily submitted by local, state, federal and tribal law enforcement agencies. The UCR remained the primary tool for collection and analysis of data for the next half century.

=== Development of NIBRS (1980s-present) ===
Throughout the 1980s, a series of National UCR Conferences were held with members from the IACP, Department of Justice (including the FBI), and the newly formed Bureau of Justice Statistics (BJS). The purpose was to determine necessary revisions to the UCR system and then implement them.

The result of these conferences was the release of the Blueprint for the Future of the Uniform Crime Reporting Program in May 1985. The key recommendations made by the report were:

1. Data should be gathered on each individual offense (rather than in monthly totals).
2. More detail should be gathered about each offense (including specific information used to classify offenses, the victim and offender's demographic characteristics, their relationship, and the location of the crime).
3. More quality assurance measures should be implemented (like routine audits, minimum reporting-system standards, increased feedback to and from local agencies, and strengthening of state-level UCR Programs).

These recommendations were implemented in the form of the National Incident-Based Reporting System (NIBRS). The FBI began accepting data in the new NIBRS format in January 1989. For many years, the FBI collected UCR data in both the NIBRS and traditional Summary Reporting System (SRS) formats. In 2015, in consultation with their law enforcement partners and the Criminal Justice Information Services (CJIS) Advisory Policy Board, the FBI announced that it would be retiring the SRS format. As of January 1, 2021, the SRS has been discontinued and been fully replaced by (NIBRS).

== Coverage ==
Each month, law enforcement agencies report the number of known index crimes in their jurisdiction to the FBI. This mainly includes crimes reported to the police by the general public, but may also include crimes that police officers discover, and known through other sources. Law enforcement agencies also report the number of crime cases cleared.

In 2003, FBI UCR data were compiled from more than 16,000 agencies, representing 93 percent of the population in 46 states and the District of Columbia. While nationally reporting is not mandated, many states have instituted laws requiring law enforcement within those states to provide UCR data.

== Data Collection and Publications ==
The UCR Program has published data on crime in the United States since 1930. In addition, the UCR Program has published more specific reports based on its primary data collection efforts and overseen other data collection efforts related to crime and law enforcement in the U.S.

=== Crime in the United States ===
The following data collection efforts and reports are all published under the heading Crime in the United States. NIBRS and the SRS have been the main data collection formats for the UCR, with the SHR and Federal Crime Data supplementing those efforts. The Hate Crime Statistics, Cargo Theft, and Human Trafficking Reports have modified the way that data was collected through NIBRS and the SRS by adding special designations to some crimes. Some hate crimes, cargo theft offenses, and human trafficking offenses appeared in earlier versions of the NIBRS and SRS data collection but would not have been labeled in a way that distinguished them from broader crime categories (like homicide, assault, theft, etc.).

- National Incident-Based Reporting System (NIBRS) - NIBRS collects information about offenses known to and arrests made by law enforcement officers in the U.S. While the FBI began collecting NIBRS-format data in 1989, the NIBRS data collection program ran concurrently with the traditional SRS for many years. As of January 1, 2021, NIBRS is the sole FBI data collection program used for crime data. NIBRS-format data is reported at the incident-level rather than in totals per months (as the SRS was). For each incident, agencies are asked to report information about the crime victim(s), the offender(s), their relationship to each other, and the value of any property stolen, lost, damaged, etc. during the incident.
- Summary Reporting System (SRS) - The SRS collected information about offenses known to and arrests made by law enforcement officers in the U.S. The SRS data collection program was in use from 1930 to 2020. SRS-format data included monthly offense totals for the eight index crimes and arrest totals for all crime types broken down by age, sex, race, and (starting in 2013) Hispanic-origin.
  - Supplementary Homicide Reports (SHR) - As part of the SRS program, agencies were also asked to submit detailed information about each homicide incident that occurred in their jurisdiction through the SHR. This information included the date, location, and circumstances of the killing, the method used to kill, and demographic characteristics of the homicide victim and the offender. In addition, the Supplementary Homicide Reports included data about incidents of justifiable homicide, that is, non-crime incidents when a private citizen kills someone committing a crime or when law enforcement kills someone while acting in the line of duty. This information is now collected as part of NIBRS.
- Hate Crime Statistics Report - As part of the Hate Crime Statistics Act passed in 1990, the UCR began collecting additional information about hate crimes reported through the SRS and NIBRS. Incidents categorized as a hate crimes are categorized by one or more bias motivation types: race/ethnicity/ancestry, religion, sexual orientation, disability, gender, and gender identity.
- Cargo Theft Report - Since 2006, as part of the Patriot Improvement and Reauthorization Act, the UCR began disseminating data on cargo theft offenses (the criminal taking of money or goods being moved for commercial purposes) in a special report.
- Human Trafficking Report - The UCR began collecting data on human trafficking offenses in 2013 as a response to the 2008 William Wilberforce Trafficking Victims Protection Reauthorization Act. Human trafficking incidents are further subdivided into commercial sex acts and involuntary servitude.
- Federal Crime Data Collection - Beginning in 2015, the UCR has published data on crimes known to federal law enforcement agencies, including the FBI. Because the federal investigations follow different processes than those of local and state law enforcement, information from many of these agencies was not traditionally reported in the UCR. The Federal Crime Data report is an effort to incorporate crimes known to federal agencies into the general UCR data.

=== Law Enforcement Data Collections ===
- Law Enforcement Officers Killed and Assaulted (LEOKA)
- Law Enforcement Suicide Data Collection
- The National Use-of-Force Data Collection

== UCR crime categories ==
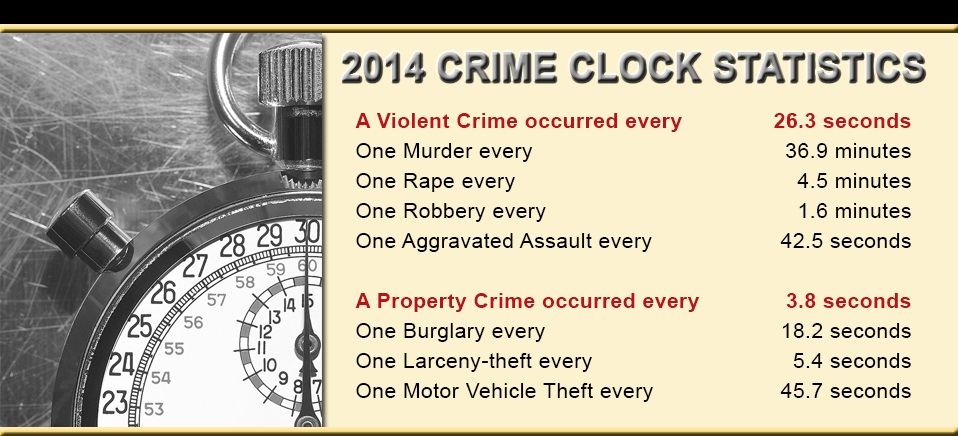
FBI Crime Clock – 2014

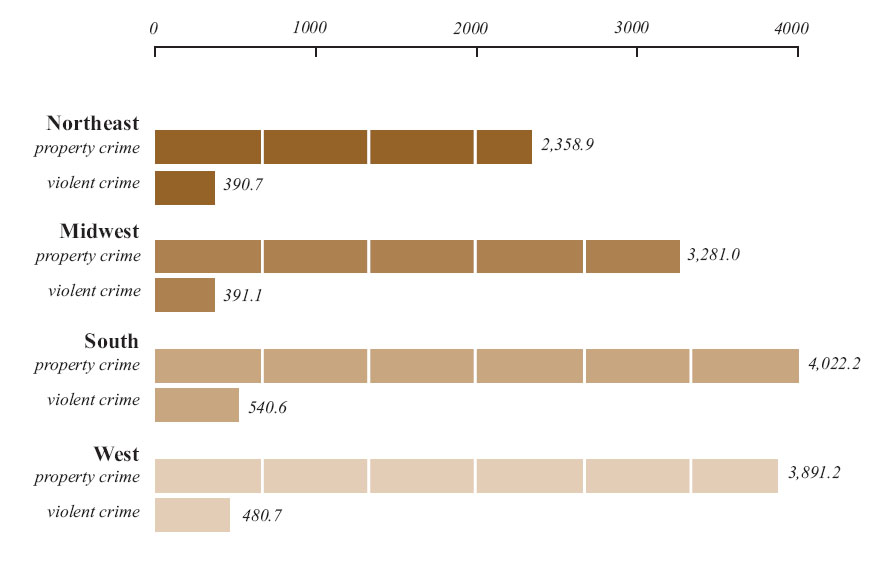
Violent and Property Crime Indexes per 100,000 population, 2004 Uniform Crime Report

=== NIBRS Categories ===
Under the National Incident-Based Reporting System (NIBRS), offenses are classified as Group A or Group B offenses. Additionally, Group A offenses can fall into one of three sub-categories: crimes against persons, crimes against property, or crimes against society.

==== Group A (Offenses & Arrests) ====
Agencies are asked to fill out an incident report for every Group A offense reported to them (or that they otherwise come to know about), regardless of whether an arrest was made. NIBRS's Group A therefore replaces and expands on the SRS's Part I offenses.

Offense Category	Offense	Crime Type	Reported By
Homicide	Murder/Non-Negligent Manslaughter	Persons	All Agencies
Homicide	Negligent Manslaughter	Persons	All Agencies
Homicide	Justifiable Homicide	Not a Crime	All Agencies
Assault	Aggravated Assault	Persons	All Agencies
Assault	Simple Assault	Persons	All Agencies
Assault	Intimidation	Persons	All Agencies
Sex Offenses	Rape	Persons	All Agencies
Sex Offenses	Sodomy^{1}	Persons	Federal and Tribal Only
Sex Offenses	Sexual Assault with An Object^{1}	Persons	Federal and Tribal Only
Sex Offenses	Fondling	Persons	All Agencies
Sex Offenses	Incest	Persons	All Agencies
Sex Offenses	Statutory Rape	Persons	All Agencies
Sex Offenses	Failure to Register as a Sex Offender	Society	All Agencies
Human Trafficking	Commercial Sex Acts	Persons	All Agencies
Human Trafficking	Involuntary Servitude	Persons	All Agencies
Kidnapping/Abduction	Kidnapping/Abduction	Persons	All Agencies
Robbery	Robbery	Property	All Agencies
Burglary/B&E	Burglary/B&E	Property	All Agencies
Larceny/Theft	Pocket Picking	Property	All Agencies
Larceny/Theft	Purse Snatching	Property	All Agencies
Larceny/Theft	Shoplifting	Property	All Agencies
Larceny/Theft	Theft from Building	Property	All Agencies
Larceny/Theft	Theft from Coin-Operated Machine or Device	Property	All Agencies
Larceny/Theft	Theft from Motor Vehicle	Property	All Agencies
Larceny/Theft	Theft of Motor Vehicle Parts or Accessories	Property	All Agencies
Larceny/Theft	All Other Larceny	Property	All Agencies
Motor Vehicle Theft	Motor Vehicle Theft	Property	All Agencies
Arson	Arson	Property	All Agencies
Bribery	Bribery	Property	All Agencies
Counterfeiting/Forgery	Counterfeiting/Forgery	Property	All Agencies
Destruction/Damage/Vandalism of Property	Destruction/Damage/Vandalism of Property	Property	All Agencies
Embezzlement	Embezzlement	Property	All Agencies
Extortion/Blackmail	Extortion/Blackmail	Property	All Agencies
Stolen Property Offenses	Stolen Property Offenses (e.g., selling, possessing)	Property	All Agencies
Fraud	False Pretenses/Swindle/Confidence Games	Property	All Agencies
Fraud	Credit Card/Automatic Teller Machine Fraud	Property	All Agencies
Fraud	Impersonation	Property	All Agencies
Fraud	Welfare Fraud	Property	All Agencies
Fraud	Wire Fraud	Property	All Agencies
Fraud	Identity Theft	Property	All Agencies
Fraud	Hacking/Computer Invasion	Property	All Agencies
Fraud	Money Laundering	Society	All Agencies
Animal Cruelty	Animal Cruelty	Society	All Agencies
Commerce Violations	Import Violations	Society	Federal and Tribal Only
Commerce Violations	Export Violations	Society	Federal and Tribal Only
Commerce Violations	Federal Liquor Offenses	Society	Federal and Tribal Only
Commerce Violations	Federal Tobacco Offenses	Society	Federal and Tribal Only
Commerce Violations	Wildlife Trafficking	Society	Federal and Tribal Only
Drug/Narcotic Violations	Drug/Narcotic Violations	Society	All Agencies
Drug/Narcotic Violations	Drug/Narcotic Equip. Violations	Society	All Agencies
Espionage	Espionage	Society	All Agencies
Fugitive Offenses	Harboring Escapee/Concealing from Arrest	Society	Federal and Tribal Only
Fugitive Offenses	Flight to Avoid Prosecution	Society	Federal and Tribal Only
Fugitive Offenses	Flight to Avoid Deportation	Society	Federal and Tribal Only
Gambling Offenses	Betting/Wagering	Society	All Agencies
Gambling Offenses	Operating/Promoting/Assisting Gambling	Society	All Agencies
Gambling Offenses	Gambling Equip. Violations	Society	All Agencies
Gambling Offenses	Sports Tampering	Society	All Agencies
Immigration Violations	Illegal Entry into the United States	Society	Federal and Tribal Only
Immigration Violations	False Citizenship	Society	Federal and Tribal Only
Immigration Violations	Smuggling Aliens	Society	Federal and Tribal Only
Immigration Violations	Re-entry after Deportation	Society	Federal and Tribal Only
Pornography/Obscene Material	Pornography/Obscene Material	Society	All Agencies
Prostitution Offenses	Prostitution	Society	All Agencies
Prostitution Offenses	Assisting or Promoting Prostitution	Society	All Agencies
Prostitution Offenses	Purchasing Prostitution	Society	All Agencies
Treason	Treason	Society	All Agencies
Weapon Law Violations	Weapon Law Violations	Society	All Agencies
Weapon Law Violations	Violation of National Firearm Act of 1934	Society	Federal and Tribal Only
Weapon Law Violations	Weapons of Mass Destruction	Society	Federal and Tribal Only
Weapon Law Violations	Explosives	Society	Federal and Tribal Only

1 Federal and tribal law enforcement agencies report sodomy and sexual assault with an object separately from rape. Other law enforcement agencies report offenses of this type under the offense label of rape.

==== Group B (Arrests Only) ====
Agencies only submit information to the FBI about Group B offenses if an arrest is made.

Offense	Reported By
Curfew/Loitering/Vagrancy Violations	All Agencies
Disorderly Conduct	All Agencies
Driving Under the Influence	All Agencies
Failure to Appear	Federal and Tribal Only
Family Offenses, Nonviolent	All Agencies
Federal Resource Violations	Federal and Tribal Only
Liquor Law Violations	All Agencies
Perjury	Federal and Tribal Only
Trespass of Real Property	All Agencies
All Other Offenses	All Agencies

=== SRS Categories ===
The UCR program's traditional Summary Reporting System (SRS) was in use from 1930 to 2020. As of January 1, 2021, the SRS has been discontinued and been fully replaced by the National Incident-Based Reporting System (NIBRS). In the SRS, criminal offenses were divided into two major groups: Part I offenses and Part II offenses.

==== Part I Offenses (Offenses & Arrests) ====
In Part I, the UCR indexed reported incidents of major crimes, referred to as "index crimes," which were reported to the FBI via a document named "Return A – Monthly Return of Offenses Known to the Police." Agencies were asked to report each month the total number of index crimes reported to them (or that they otherwise came to know about) regardless of whether an arrest was made.

Crimes were included in the index based on their relative seriousness, their tendency to be reported more reliably than other crime types, and that reports for them are generally taken directly by the police and not a separate agency which aggregates the data and does not necessarily contribute to the UCR. The index crimes were broken into two categories: violent and property crimes. Murder and non-negligent manslaughter, forcible rape, robbery, and aggravated assault were classified as violent crimes and used to create an overall "violent crime index" while burglary, larceny-theft, motor vehicle theft, and arson were classified as property crimes and used to create an overall "property crime index."

Arson was not initially included as one of the Part I index crimes. It was added in 1979 by a congressional directive.

From 1930 to 1957, negligent manslaughter was included in UCR reporting as one of the violent index crimes. As of 1958 annual report, it was no longer included in reporting about the index crimes, although the FBI continued to request information about the total number of negligent homicide offenses known to law enforcement agencies as part of Return A until 1985. So, from 1958 to 1985, negligent manslaughter was a Part I offense but not an index crime.

==== Part II Offenses (Arrests Only) ====
In Part II, the following categories were tracked: simple assault, curfew offenses and loitering, embezzlement, forgery and counterfeiting, disorderly conduct, driving under the influence, drug offenses, fraud, gambling, liquor offenses, offenses against the family, prostitution, public drunkenness, runaways, sex offenses, stolen property, vandalism, vagrancy, and weapons offenses. Agencies were asked to report each month the total number of arrests made for all Part I and Part II offenses.

== Advisory groups ==
The Criminal Justice Information Systems Committees of the International Association of Chiefs of Police (IACP) and the National Sheriffs' Association (NSA) serve in an advisory capacity to the UCR Program and encourage local police departments and sheriff's departments to participate fully in the program.

In 1988, a Data Providers' Advisory Policy Board was established to provide input for UCR matters. The Board operated until 1993 when it combined with the National Crime Information Center Advisory Policy Board to form a single Advisory Policy Board (APB) to address all issues regarding the FBI's criminal justice information services. In addition, the Association of State UCR Programs (ASUCRP) focuses on UCR issues within individual state law enforcement associations and promotes interest in the UCR Program. These organizations foster widespread and responsible use of UCR statistics and assist data contributors when needed.

== Limitations ==
The UCR itself warns that it reflects crime reports by police, not later adjudication. Because reporting quality, arrest likelihood, officers per capita, and funding vary by jurisdiction, the data should not be used to compare crime rates or frequencies between reporting agencies.

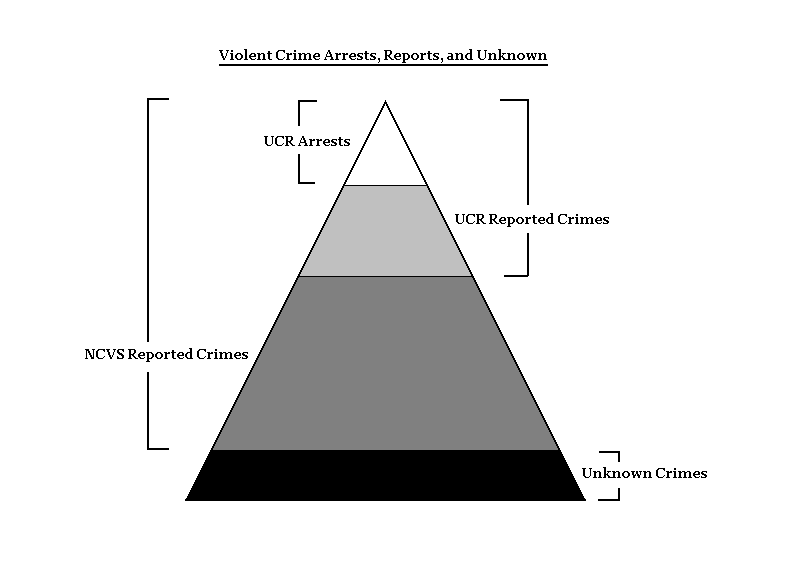
Comparing arrests, reports and unknown violent crime

== See also ==
- National Crime Victimization Survey
- Uniform Crime Reporting Handbook
