= National Incident-Based Reporting System =

System used by law enforcement agencies in the United States

The National Incident-Based Reporting System (NIBRS) is an incident-based reporting system used by law enforcement agencies in the United States for collecting and reporting data on crimes. Local, state and federal agencies generate NIBRS data from their records management systems. Data is collected on every incident and arrest in the Group A offense category. These Group A offenses are 52 offenses grouped in 23 crime categories. Specific facts about these offenses are gathered and reported to NIBRS. In addition to the Group A offenses, 10 Group B offenses are reported with only the arrest information.

== History ==
Uniform Crime Reports (UCR) began in the late 1920s when the Committee on Uniform Crime Records, established by the International Association of Chiefs of Police (IACP) in 1927, published the first version of the Uniform Crime Reporting Handbook. With this initiative, the Uniform Crime Reporting program began under the jurisdiction of the Federal Bureau of Investigation. Over the years, the uniform crime report developed into a broad utility for summary-based reporting of crimes. By the late 1970s, the law enforcement community saw the need for a more detailed crime reporting program that would meet the needs of law enforcement agencies in the 21st century.

Testing for the new NIBRS system began in South Carolina. The new system was approved for general use at a national UCR conference in March 1988.

== Similarities and differences between SRS and NIBRS ==
The general concepts, such as jurisdictional rules, of collecting and reporting SRS (Summary Reporting System) data [used by UCR] are the same as in NIBRS. However, NIBRS goes into much greater detail than SRS. NIBRS includes 24 Group A crime categories whereas SRS only has 8 crime categories classified as Part I.

In NIBRS, the definition of rape has been expanded to include male victims. SRS, until recently, defined rape as "the carnal knowledge of a female forcibly and against her will" but since has been expanded. Formerly in SRS, sex attacks against males were to be classified only as either assaults or "other sex offenses", depending on the nature of the crime and the extent of the injury.

When multiple crimes are committed by a single person or group of persons during the same basic period of time and same basic location, SRS uses a "Hierarchy Rule" (see UCR for details) to determine which offenses will be reported for that incident. Only the most serious offense is reported. For example, if a criminal burglarizes a residence and assaults the inhabitant, only the assault is reported as it takes precedence over the burglary on the "Hierarchy Rule". NIBRS reports all offenses involved in a particular incident.

SRS has only two crime categories: Crimes Against Persons (e.g., murder, rape, assault, robbery) and Crimes Against Property (e.g., car theft, burglary, larceny, arson). NIBRS adds a third category titled Crimes Against Society for activities such as drug or narcotic offenses and other activities prohibited by society's rules.

Finally, agencies submit SRS data in written documents that must then be hand entered into a computer system for statistical analysis. NIBRS data are submitted electronically in the form of ASCII text files. These files are then processed without the need for a person to input the data (except at the originating agency's initial filing of the report into their computer system).

== Reported offense categories ==
=== Group A offenses ===
1. Animal Cruelty
2. Arson
3. Assault (Aggravated, Simple, Intimidation)
4. Bribery
5. Burglary/Breaking and Entering
6. Counterfeiting/Forgery
7. Destruction/Damage/Vandalism of Property
8. Drug/Narcotic Offenses (including drug equipment violations)
9. Embezzlement
10. Extortion/Blackmail
11. Fraud (false pretenses/swindle/confidence game, credit card and ATM fraud, impersonation, welfare and wire fraud)
12. Gambling (betting, wagering, operating/promoting/assisting gambling, gambling equipment violations, sports tampering)
13. Homicide (murder and non-negligent manslaughter, negligent manslaughter, justifiable homicide)
14. Human Trafficking
15. Kidnapping/Abduction
16. Larceny (pocket picking, purse snatching, shoplifting, theft and all other larceny)
17. Motor vehicle theft
18. Pornography/Obscene Material
19. Prostitution Offenses (prostitution, assisting or promoting prostitution)
20. Robbery
21. Sex Offenses, Forcible (forcible rape, forcible sodomy, sexual assault with an object, forcible fondling)
22. Sex Offenses, Non-forcible (incest, statutory rape)
23. Stolen Property Offenses/Fence
24. Weapon Law Violations

=== Group B offenses ===
1. Bad Checks
2. Curfew/Loitering/Vagrancy Violations
3. Disorderly Conduct
4. Driving Under the Influence
5. Drunkenness
6. Family Offenses, Nonviolent
7. Liquor Law Violations
8. Peeping Tom
9. Trespass of Real Property
10. All Other Offenses

== Use of NIBRS in the U.S. ==
As of October 31, 2020, 8,742 law enforcement agencies representing 48.9 percent of the population were reporting NIBRS data to the UCR program. At that time, 43 states were NIBRS-certified as having records management systems that meet the FBI's requirement for collecting crime data according to established technical specifications. [FBI]. As of January 1, 2022, 11,794 law enforcement agencies representing 69 percent of the population were reporting NIBRS data to the UCR program. This generated concerns over the effect of the incomplete data on public interpretations.

As of the 2023 Quarter 2 Uniform Crime Report data with 13,363 participating agencies (out of 18,892 agencies across the country) the FBI was still "unable to make confident statements about national crime trends" because of incomplete participation which did not achieve a "minimum of 60 percent population coverage for these most in-population cities" (for example, at the time, NYPD and LAPD were both missing data). Compliance is an even greater challenge in small agencies, with agencies covering <25,000 people having an average compliance of only 55 percent.

The participation rose by 2023 Quarter 4 with 82 percent of the population covered by 15,199 participating agencies (of 19,152) reporting data, including NYPD and LAPD.

A number of states, such as Texas and South Carolina, use a customized version of NIBRS. These versions return the basic data required by the FBI, but include additional data required by the state. This additional data are supplied with an additional segment type (see below for information on data segments) or appended to the appropriate segment line. For example, the Texas system (TIBRs) includes an additional segment (Segment Level 8) with additional data elements such as number of drug labs or fields seized, precursor drug chemicals involved and family violence data. The South Carolina system (SCIBRs) includes data like second location type, victim's usage of drugs or alcohol and space for additional offenses on arrests (other than the specific offense for which the person was arrested). These data are appended to the appropriate segment type.

== Data format ==
NIBRS data are submitted in an ASCII text format. There are 8 segments in the NIBRS system (numbered 0–7). Each segment is represented in a single line in the text file. Lines are separated with a newline character.

=== Zero-reporting segment ===
The Level 0 segment is only filed if an agency does not have any criminal offenses or arrests to report during a given reporting period.

=== Administrative segment ===
The Level 1 segment contains administrative information for a single incident. This information includes the incident number, date, time and a list of offenses. Only one Level 1 segment is submitted for each incident with an offense in the Group A category. For each Level 1 segment, there may be one or more segments from Levels 2 through 6.

=== Offense segment ===
A Level 2 segment is submitted for each offense and provides details on the offense such as the UCR offense code, whether or not the offense was completed, the location type, number of premises entered (only valid for burglaries), type of criminal activity and the type of weapon or force used in the crime.

=== Property segment ===
Any property involved in an offense is recorded in the Level 3 segment. The loss type (stolen, recovered, burned, seized, damaged, etc.), value, description and recovery date (only for recovered property) are provided as well as data on stolen and recovered motor vehicles and seized drugs.

=== Victim segment ===
Every victim involved in the incident is detailed in the Level 4 segment. The victim's age, sex, race, ethnicity, relationship to the offender(s), type of injury and special circumstances for certain offense types are recorded.

=== Offender segment ===
Each offender's age, sex and race are reported using the Level 5 segment.

=== Arrestee segment ===
The Level 6 segment is filed for each person arrested under a Group A offense. The data submitted via this segment includes the arrest date, type and offense code. The arrestee's age, sex, race, ethnicity and resident status (whether or not the arrestee is a resident of the arresting agency's jurisdiction) are reported along with any weapons with which the arrestee was armed and a disposition code for arrestees under 18 years of age.

=== Group B arrest segment ===
Each person arrested under a Group B offense is reported using a Level 7 segment. The arrestee's age, sex, race, ethnicity and resident status are reported along with any weapons with which the arrestee was armed. A disposition code for arrestees under 18 years of age is also reported.

== See also ==
- Federal Bureau of Investigation
- ODIS
- Sex offender registries in the United States
- Uniform Crime Reports
