= Shaun Attwood =

British writer, convicted criminal and YouTuber (born 1968)

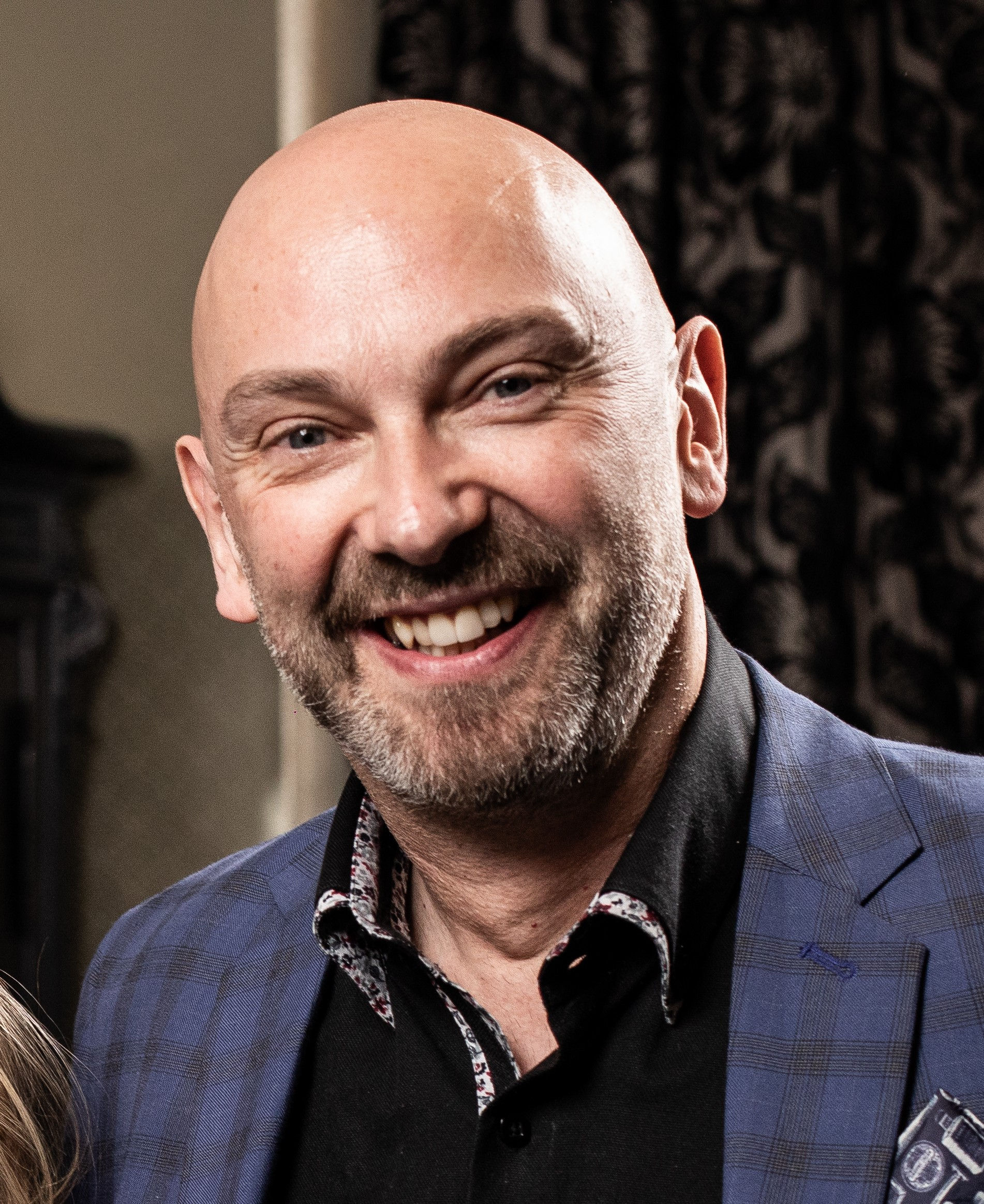
- Attwood in September 2025
- Born: Shaun Patrick Attwood; 28 October 1968 (age 57); Widnes, Cheshire, England
- Occupations: Author; activist; YouTube personality
- Known for: Ecstasy distribution in the 1990s

YouTube information
- Channel: Shaun Attwood
- Subscribers: 1,100,001 (as of 3 May 2026)
- Views: 246,593,544 (as of 3 May 2026)
- Website: shaunattwood.com

Shaun Attwood (born 28 October 1968) is a British former ecstasy trafficker turned YouTuber, speaker, activist and author.

Born in Widnes, Attwood became interested in the stock market at age 14, trading for the first time at the age of 16. After travelling to Arizona regularly to visit his aunts, Attwood moved there and became involved in the rave scene as an ecstasy smuggler and dealer. He was arrested in 2002, then released in 2007 and deported back to England. Following his release, Attwood became a speaker and author, chronicling his experiences in prison.

His story was featured worldwide on National Geographic Channel as an episode of Locked Up Abroad called "Raving Arizona". Random House published his life story as the English Shaun Trilogy. Since his first book Hard Time was published in 2011, Attwood has authored books on his life and other topics.

== Early life ==
Shaun Attwood was born in Widnes, Lancashire (now Cheshire) on 28 October 1968, in a middle-class household, which he has described as "loving".

After watching several films mentioning stock markets, Attwood educated himself, with the help of his teacher in economics, on trading stocks by reading the Financial Times at fourteen. When he was sixteen, during the privatisation of many public companies by the Margaret Thatcher government, Attwood attempted to invest in British Telecommunications. After inquiring with his father, a Labour supporter who disagreed with Thatcher government's actions, Attwood sought money from his grandmother who supported the Conservative party and eventually got £50 which he invested and doubled. He regularly visited his aunts in Arizona where he became interested in living in the United States.

Attwood attended Liverpool University, studying business studies and graduating in 1990. While attending university, Attwood began using ecstasy in the Manchester rave scene which helped him with his anxiety.

== Ecstasy trafficker: 1997–2002 ==
As Attwood began to organise larger parties with his money, he started bulk purchasing ecstasy in Los Angeles and distributing large amounts of it in Arizona. This gradually turned into what the Phoenix New Times called an "empire", with Attwood buying pills from the Netherlands to bypass the traffickers in Los Angeles. His operation became associated with the New Mexican Mafia, which offered protection following a night of partying where Attwood's associates helped a brother of a New Mexican Mafia member with hiding from the police.

Allegedly, his main competitor in the ecstasy market was Salvatore "Sammy the Bull" Gravano, a Mafia murderer and former underboss of the Gambino crime family. Gravano's crew members attempted to kill Attwood and many of Attwood's associates, which caused him to stop dealing and give up distributing, retreating to his then-girlfriend's apartment and living off money earned during his time distributing. Michael Franzese, ex-caporegime of the Colombo crime family, said that Attwood's Arizona ecstasy ring was in competition with Gravano's and that Franzese knew about both rings in the late 90s when they were both active. In 2021, National Geographic televised Narco Wars, season 2, episode 4, "How E Busted The Bull", which featured the Gravano ecstasy ring versus Attwood's ecstasy ring. Attwood estimated he smuggled up to £4 million of drugs into Arizona, including ecstasy, Xanax and ketamine. In 2021, Attwood's story was featured in the Vice documentary I Was a Teenage Felon: "Ecstasy Kingpin".

Evidence had already been collected against Attwood from his years as an ecstasy kingpin, and, on 16 May 2002, he was arrested at the apartment. Attwood, who had attempted to cleanse himself of any connections to his previous life as a distributor, was caught after ten witnesses came forward.

After serving two years in Maricopa County Jail prior to sentencing, Attwood pleaded guilty for a sentence of nine and a half years, and served the balance of his sentence in the Arizona Department of Corrections. He is banned for life from entering the United States.

In 2004, from inside the maximum-security Madison Street jail, Attwood wrote about his experiences. These accounts were posted online as the first ever prison blog titled "Jon's Jail Journal" to preserve his anonymity; this began to draw international media attention to the conditions that prevailed under Sheriff Joe Arpaio.

== Post-incarceration life ==
In 2007, Attwood was released and deported to the UK, where he started the first-ever prison YouTube channel under his name. He continues to maintain his blog, now under his own name, where he publishes letters and accounts sent to him by other prisoners.

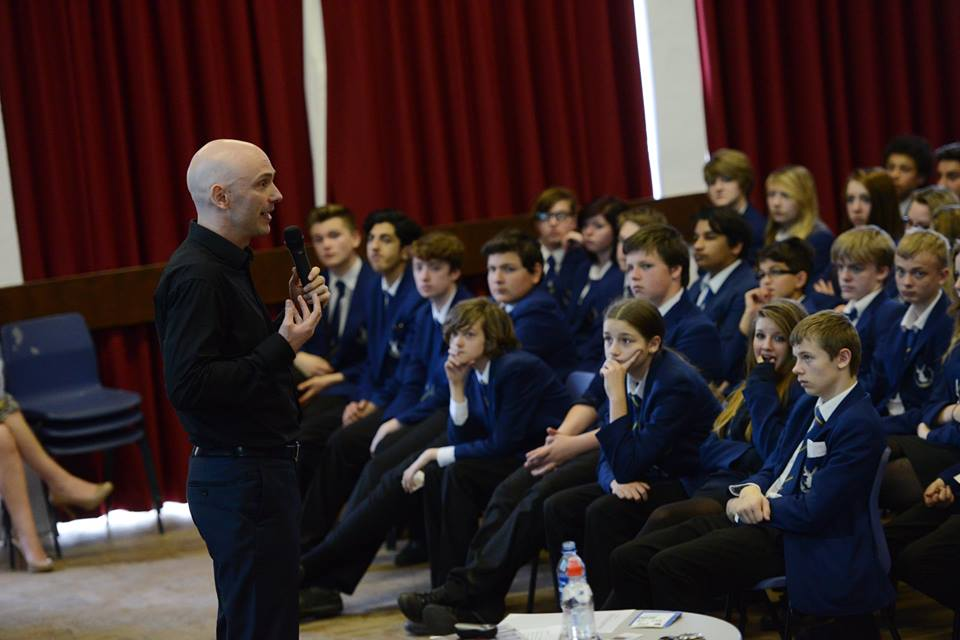
Attwood visiting a school

Attwood now gives talks to schoolchildren and other groups about the negative consequences of drugs and crime, and advocates against Arpaio and his methods. Shaun has given several TEDx Talks on his experiences. The University of St. Gallen in Switzerland hosted his 3 December 2016 talk on what facing 200 years in prison taught him about happiness. He has appeared on BBC, Sky News, CNN and TV in over 40 countries worldwide to talk about issues affecting prisoners' rights.

After appearing on the True Geordie podcast, Attwood started his own true crime podcast on his YouTube channel, which has 1,074,216 subscribers as of January 2026. He answers questions about what prison was like, interviews true-crime guests, and retells stories of what happened during his time in prison. Attwood has conducted several interviews and has written books on the case surrounding the underage sex trafficking ring around Jeffrey Epstein, and has interviewed Richard Dawkins, Robbie Williams, Ari Ben-Menashe and Chris Hansen. Attwood started his own Best Podcast Clips TikTok channel, which has over 1,200,000 subscribers as of May 2026.

== Bibliography ==
- Hard Time, 1st edition, Random House (2011); 2nd edition, Gadfly Press (2014)
- Party Time, 1st edition, Random House (2013), 2nd edition, Gadfly Press (2018)
- Prison Time, 1st edition, Random House (2014), 2nd edition, Gadfly Press (2018)
- Life Lessons (2015)
- Pablo Escobar: Beyond Narcos, Gadfly Press (2016)
- American Made: Who Killed Barry Seal? Pablo Escobar or George HW Bush, Gadfly Press (2016)
- Un-Making a Murderer: The Framing of Steven Avery and Brendan Dassey, Gadfly Press (2017)
- The Cali Cartel: Beyond Narcos, Gadfly Press (2017)
- The Mafia Philosopher: Two Tonys, Gadfly Press (2018)
- Pablo Escobar's Story 1: The Rise, Gadfly Press (2018)
- Pablo Escobar's Story 2: Narcos at War, Gadfly Press (2019)
- Clinton Bush and CIA Conspiracies: From The Boys on the Tracks to Jeffrey Epstein, Gadfly Press (2019, formerly titled We Are Being Lied To: The War on Drugs)
- Pablo Escobar's Story 3: Narcos Demise, Gadfly Press (2020)
- Who Killed Epstein? Prince Andrew or Bill Clinton?, Gadfly Press (2021)
- Elite Predators: From Jimmy Savile and Lord Mountbatten to Jeffrey Epstein and Ghislaine Maxwell, Gadfly Press (2022)
- Sitdowns with Gangsters (2023)
- Untouchable Jimmy Savile (2023)
- Sitdowns with Female Gangsters (2024)
- Sitdowns with Serial Killers and Murderers (2025)
