= Dan Saban =

Former Police Chief of Buckeye, Arizona

Buckeye Police Chief
- In office February 2005 – May 2008

Personal details
- Party: Republican

Daniel E. Saban (born 1956) is the former police chief of Buckeye, Arizona, United States of America and three-time candidate for sheriff of Maricopa County, Arizona. Saban ran as a Republican in 2004, as a Democrat in 2008, and again as a Republican in 2016.

== Early life and career ==
Saban has a bachelor's degree from Arizona State University in justice studies and a master's degree from Northern Arizona University in human relations and educational leadership.

Saban worked as a law enforcement professional for 32 years, serving in the Maricopa County Sheriff's Office (1975–1979), Mesa Police Department (1979–2004; Commander, ret.) and Buckeye Police Department (2005–2008; Chief of Police). Saban now owns The Saban Group, LLC, a law enforcement litigation and consulting company.

== Political career ==
Saban has alleged that he was a victim of his political rival, Maricopa County Sheriff Joe Arpaio. During Saban's 2004 run for sheriff, Arpaio opened a criminal investigation into a 30-year-old allegation that Saban, then 17, had raped his adoptive mother. Saban lost the election and sued for defamation and lost but cost the county $800,000 in legal fees.

Saban was endorsed by The Arizona Republic and the Phoenix New Times when he ran in 2008.

=== 2008 election results ===
2008 Maricopa County Sheriff's Office election, Arizona
Party	Candidate	Votes	%	±%
Republican	Joe Arpaio (incumbent)	730,426	55.2	−1.5
Democratic	Dan Saban	558,176	42.2	+11.5
Libertarian	Chris A.H. Will	35,425	2.7	n/a
Majority		172,250	13.0	−13.0
Turnout		1,324,027		+16.8
Republican hold		Swing		
