= Match fixing related to gambling =

Control of the outcome of sporting events to affect gambling results

Match fixing related to gambling is a problem in many sports. According to Sportradar, a company that monitors the integrity of sports events on behalf of sports federations, as many as 1% of the matches they monitor are likely to be fixed.

== Betting related match fixing scandals ==
While British football has never been rocked by match fixing allegations on the scale of the Black Sox scandal (the aforementioned incidents involved league matches, not major championships), football match-fixing has become a serious problem in parts of Continental Europe.

Cricket has been affected by several high-profile match-fixing scandals, including the case of Hansie Cronje in the late 1990s and investigations surrounding the 2007 Cricket World Cup. These highly publicised enquiries were prompted by the surprise defeat of Pakistan in the Cup by Ireland and the subsequent murder investigation into the sudden death, straight after the match, of Pakistan's head coach Bob Woolmer. According to the head of the ICC's anti-corruption unit Paul Condon, cricket is the most bet on sport in the world, and fixing is found at every level of the sport and is a significant problem. The 2008 novel Raffles and the Match-Fixing Syndicate, by Adam Corres, places E. W. Hornung's A. J. Raffles, 'the gentleman thief', into the world of cricket match-fixing. This black humour comedy includes speculation on the infamous Hansie Cronje and Bob Woolmer incidents and features serious aspects of cricket gamesmanship or 'how to defeat a superior opponent without actually cheating', a vital skill in the cricketing psychology of 'thinking the batsman out'.

The high salaries of some of today's professional athletes likely serves to insulate their leagues from player-instigated match fixing. However, in leagues where the players are less well-paid, or not paid at all (for example, the amateur NCAA), match fixing by players remains a serious concern.

== Preventing match fixing related to gambling ==
=== Ban on sports betting ===
Regardless of the verdict of juries, no player who throws a ball game, no player who undertakes or promises to throw a ball game, no player who sits in confidence with a bunch of crooked ballplayers and gamblers, where the ways and means of throwing a game are discussed and does not promptly tell his club about it, will ever play professional baseball.

— Kenesaw Mountain Landis, in the aftermath of the Black Sox Scandal

Influenced by baseball's experiences, the NFL and NBA have followed MLB's lead and adopted a hard line against gambling on its games, especially by those directly involved in the league. The NCAA takes an even harder line:

- It prohibits athletes, coaches, other athletic program staff, and non-athletic administrators with oversight over athletics programs at member schools, plus staff of member conferences, from gambling on any sport in which the NCAA holds a championship or any sport classified by the NCAA as an "emerging sport" for women. The prohibition includes professional competition in all of the aforementioned sports, and also specifically includes Division I FBS football, in which the NCAA does not sponsor an official championship.
- It also prohibits venues in championship play from carrying advertising for any form of gambling, including state lotteries.

The betting policy of the World Baseball Softball Confederation, which governs international baseball and softball, is influenced by that of Major League Baseball. Participants in WBSC-sanctioned events are prohibited from betting on events within their sport, regardless of sanctioning. For example, individuals associated with international baseball cannot bet on Major League Baseball games, though those associated only with softball can bet on MLB games. In addition, when baseball and/or softball is part of a multisport event, individuals involved with the participants in the baseball/softball events cannot bet on any other event taking place at that specific multisport event.

Each of these organizations was, and may still be influenced by fears that their games could come under the influence of gamblers in the absence of these tough measures. Critics of such hard line measures note that in spite of such policies, such influence nonetheless does occur.

When international motorcycle racing (MotoGP and World Superbike) race in the United States, the online gambling sites that advertise are prohibited from having their advertising on the motorcycles, owing to the similar hard line against gambling enforced by the majority of sports federations in the country. AMA Pro Racing (the ASN for the FIM in the United States) regulations prohibit gambling advertising and prohibit participants from betting on races.

=== National regulation on sports betting ===
In Britain the authorities in both government and sport have taken a softer line on gambling. Following decades of relatively lax, intermittent and ineffective enforcement of laws prohibiting gambling, sports betting was finally legalized and regulated in the 1960s. Organizations such as The Football Association long seemed to have taken the stance that gambling on their events was inevitable. For many years, the FA only prohibited betting on a match by those directly involved in the game in question. Footballers (or coaches, managers, etc.) were not prohibited from betting on matches that did not involve their own team.

The FA has since adopted a much harder line on betting within the sport. Current rules ban all players, managers, and club personnel associated with any club in the top eight levels of the English men's league system, or in the top two levels of the women's league system, from betting on any football match anywhere in the world. This ban also applies to match officials, plus coaches and assessors thereof, who operate at Level 3 or above within the FA's referee classification system. As for individuals at lower levels of the football system, they are banned from betting on any match in the league in which they participate, as well as matches in which they are directly involved.

Match fixing in football remains a major concern. In Turkey in 2011 more than 30 players and staff have been convicted of game fixing. In South Korea, more than 50 professional soccer players have been indicted and ten players have received lifetime bans. In Finland, two Zambian players were convicted and more than a dozen people are under investigation. Other investigations are continuing in China, El Salvador, Germany, Greece, Hungary, Israel, Italy, Thailand, Vietnam, and Zimbabwe. In the United States and Canada, Major League Soccer and the Professional Referee Organization have a "Match Manipulation and Gambling Policy Statement" poster similar to Major League Baseball's Rule 21 posted in the locker rooms banning any betting on any match that features the MLS.

The integrity of horse racing remains an ongoing concern since gambling is an integral part of this sport. Recent allegations of race fixing have centered around the recently formed betting exchanges which unlike traditional bookmakers allow punters to lay an outcome (that is, to bet against a particular runner). Most tracks prohibit jockeys from betting on races if they are riding during the day. Leading exchange Betfair has responded to the allegations by signing Memorandums of Understanding with the Jockey Club, The FA, the International Cricket Council, the Association of Tennis Professionals and other sporting authorities. These memoranda of understanding are evidence of the vast difference between British and American attitudes — as of 2008 it would be almost unthinkable for an American sports league to sign such an agreement with a bookmaker or betting exchange.

=== Monitoring betting markets ===
By monitoring the pre-match betting markets it is possible to detect planned match fixing. It is also possible to detect on-going match manipulation by looking at the in-game betting markets. Several federations have employed services that provide such systems for detecting match manipulation. In addition, several federations run integrity tours where players and officials participate in educational workshops on how match fixing work and how they are prevented.

=== Educational integrity workshops ===
Several federations run integrity tours where players and officials participate in educational workshops on how match fixing works and how they are prevented.

== See also ==
- Match fixing in tennis
