= Uniform Crime Reporting Handbook =

American manual about reporting crimes

Frequently referred to as The Green Book due to its green cover, the Uniform Crime Reporting Handbook is a publication of the United States Department of Justice and the Federal Bureau of Investigation. The manual instructs law enforcement officers on the proper method for filling out the monthly Uniform Crime Reports returns for police records and statistics.

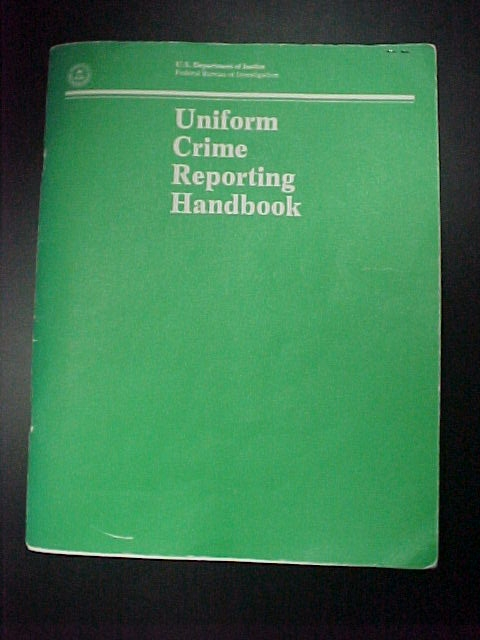
The 1984 revision of the Uniform Crime Reporting Handbook

There are many differences between Uniform Crime Reporting and other measures of crime rates and victimization.

== History ==
The Committee on Uniform Crime Records, established by the International Association of Chiefs of Police (IACP) in 1927, published the first version of the manual in 1929. At that time, the manual defined Part I and Part II offenses and well as the Return A – Monthly Return of Offenses Known to the Police. The most recent revision of the manual was published in 2004.

== Chapters ==
Introduction
A history of the UCR program and details on other state-run programs
General Information
Definitions, details on the Hierarchy Rule for offenses and details on the Separation of Time and Place Rule
Classifying Offenses
Rules for classifying the Part I offenses (see Uniform Crime Reports for information on Part I offenses)
Scoring Offenses
Rules for scoring the Part I offenses on the Return A form
Monthly Reporting Forms and Their Preparation
A detailed look at each of the nine monthly UCR reports
Other UCR Program Forms
Information on optional UCR supplies, such as the tally book and daily log book
Part II Offenses
Details on Part II offenses (see Uniform Crime Reports for information on Part II offenses)

== See also ==
- Victimology
