= Maricopa County Sheriff's Office controversies =

The Maricopa County Sheriff's Office (MCSO) is a law enforcement agency in Maricopa County, Arizona, that has been involved in a number of controversies. It is the largest sheriff's office in the state of Arizona and provides general and specialized law enforcement to unincorporated areas of Maricopa County, serving as the primary law enforcement for unincorporated areas of the county as well as incorporated cities within the county which have contracted with the agency for law-enforcement services. It also operates the county jail system. Penzone replaced Joe Arpaio after his 24-year tenure as sheriff.

According to The Washington Post, on August 17, 2010, the United States Department of Justice Civil Rights Division opened an inquiry into the Sheriff's Department in relation to alleged racism and abuse of power, as well as refusing to cooperate with a federal Justice Department investigation.

On December 15, 2011, the U.S. Justice Department released its finding that the Sheriff's department repeatedly arrested Latinos illegally, abused them in the county jails and failed to investigate hundreds of sexual assaults. The Department of Homeland Security, reacting to the Justice Department report, revoked Maricopa County jail officers' authority to detain people on immigration charges. The Justice Department report found that the Sheriff's office carried out a blatant pattern of discrimination against Latinos and held a "systematic disregard" for the United States Constitution. The department's racial profiling expert found the sheriff's office to be the most egregious case of profiling ever seen in the United States.

== Maricopa County Sheriff's Office ==
The MCSO Vision Statement as posted on their own web site states: “The Maricopa County Sheriff's Office is a fully integrated law enforcement agency committed to being the leader in establishing the standards for providing professional quality law enforcement, detention, and support services to the citizens of Maricopa County and to other criminal justice agencies.”

A December 2008 report by the Goldwater Institute compared MCSO with their peer agencies in the same cities. In violent crime, the Federal Bureau of Investigation (FBI) showed the MCSO has a 69% increase compared to their peers of 18% and −11%. For homicides, the MCSO had a 160% increase compared to other jurisdictions which were near zero.

In 2009, the East Valley Tribune won a Pulitzer Prize for its five-part series that exposed how police protection suffered as the MCSO increased efforts to combat illegal immigration. The Tribune reporters Ryan Gabrielson and Paul Giblin produced the five-part series “Reasonable Doubt,” which exposed slow emergency response times and lax criminal enforcement as the department focused more of the agency's resources on seeking out and arresting illegal immigrants.

=== Racial profiling ===
The MCSO has been accused of racial profiling in lawsuits filed by the American Civil Liberties Union (ACLU). In one suit, the ACLU alleged that MCSO deputies arrested and detained U.S. citizens and legal residents without justification, stopping them as they were driving down a public roadway, and transporting them to the site of an immigration raid. A separate class-action suit, filed by the ACLU and the Mexican American Legal Defense and Educational Fund (MALDEF) alleged that MCSO deputies unlawfully stopped and mistreated individuals because they were Latino. The lawsuit charged that this practice is discriminatory and unlawfully violates the Fourth (1789) and Fourteenth Amendments (1868) to the United States Constitution, Title VI of the Civil Rights Act of 1964, and the Constitution of Arizona.

In 2013, judge G. Murray Snow of the United States District Court for the District of Arizona ruled in a civil lawsuit, in which a number of Hispanic individuals represented by the ACLU alleged racial profiling by the Sheriff's Office. Among other remedies, Judge Snow appointed a court monitor to oversee compliance with his orders that included video cameras in every police car, and training of staff. Further controversy erupted when department training videos surfaced in which Judge Snow's orders were trivialized.

=== Department of Justice investigations ===
In June 2008, the United States Department of Justice (DOJ) began an investigation of the Maricopa County Sheriff's Office. In March 2009, the US Department of Justice notified Arpaio that they were investigating the department for civil rights violations, in unfairly targeting Hispanics and Spanish-speaking people. The DOJ found "reasonable cause to believe that MCSO engages in a pattern or practice of violating the Constitution and laws of the United States" and that "MCSO is broken".

In October 2009, it was reported that the Federal Bureau of Investigation (FBI) was investigating Arpaio for using his position to settle political vendettas.

In January 2010, it was reported that the Department of Justice had impaneled a grand jury to investigate allegations of abuse of power by Arpaio.

In March 2010, it was reported that an investigation into Arpaio is "serious and ongoing", according to United States Attorney General Eric Holder; however, by August 2012, the Department of Justice decided to close its criminal investigation and to not bring any charges.

=== Tucson Four ===
Very soon after the Waddell Buddhist temple shooting in 1991, the Office arrested four men acting on a tip from a patient at a mental-health facility. After thirteen hours of interrogation, all four signed confessions. Later two other men were arrested for nine counts of murder.

The Office settled the matter with cash payments of over two million dollars.

=== Jail conditions ===
In October 2008, federal judge Neil V. Wake of the United States District Court for the District of Arizona ruled that conditions in Maricopa County jails violated the constitutional rights of inmates.

In April 2010, Wake ruled that conditions in the Maricopa County jails continued to violate the constitutional rights of inmates.

=== Contempt citation of detention officer ===
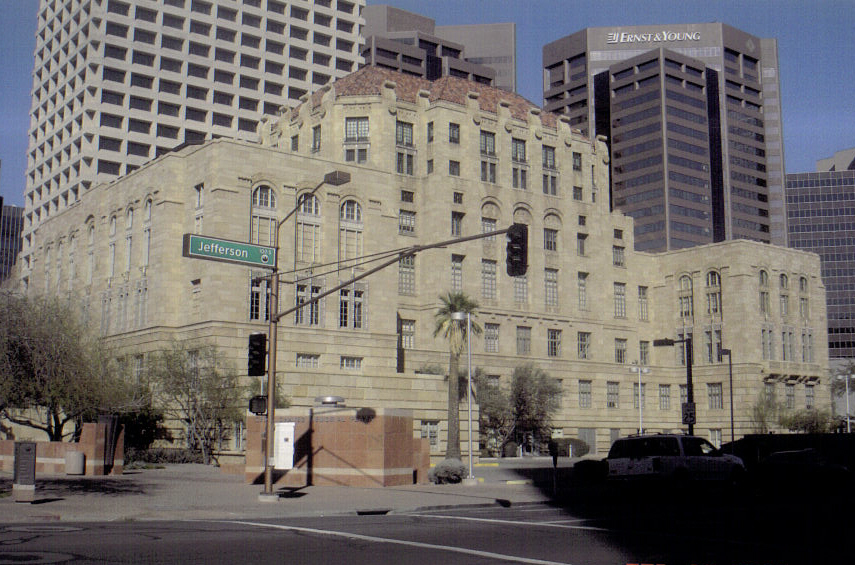
The Maricopa County Court House

In October 2009, a courtroom video was posted on YouTube, showing an MCSO Detention Officer removing documents from a defense attorney's files. Detention Officer Adam Stoddard was subsequently found in contempt-of-court for violating attorney–client privilege, was ordered by judge Gary Donahoe to hold a press conference and to publicly apologize for his actions. On the deadline set by the court, Detention Officer Stoddard, under orders from Sheriff Joe Arpaio, declined to apologize and was jailed. Arpaio argued that only he could order his Detention Officer's actions, and that the court had no authority to enforce any action against his officer, a position that the Appeals Court rejected in Stoddard's appeal. The Appeals Court did order that Judge Donahoe's order to make an apology be stricken and replaced with a fine. The next day, 20 MCSO detention officers failed to report for work at the downtown Phoenix Superior Court. A bomb threat was called in, causing the building to be evacuated. The same afternoon, more than 150 deputies and detention officers gathered outside the courthouse and reiterated their support for the jailed detention officer. The MCSO appealed the contempt order, and pending the outcome of the appeal, the deputy was released from jail. Ultimately, the contempt-of-court ruling was upheld, however the court of appeals threw out the penalty (that the officer apologize), and sent the case back to the superior court for the imposition of a fine.

=== Controversial use of SWAT forces ===
On July 23, 2004, a SWAT team (Special Weapons And Tactics) served a search warrant looking for "a stockpile of illegal automatic weapons and armor-piercing pistol ammunition" that they believed was hidden at an upscale home. In the course of serving the warrant, multiple tear gas cartridges were launched into the home, the result of which was the home catching fire. During the fire, SWAT forced the homeowner's 10-month-old pit bull puppy back into the home with a fire extinguisher, resulting in the dog's death. It was reported that the officers laughed over the incident. The armored personnel carrier (APC) used during the assault also ran over and damaged a neighbor's vehicle when its brakes failed. Police recovered two weapons: one antique shotgun; and one 9mm pistol. After failing to find illicit weapons the police served an arrest warrant for the house's owner, who was also wanted on a misdemeanor warrant for failing to appear in Tempe Municipal Court on several traffic citations.

== Joe Arpaio ==
=== Actions as Maricopa County Sheriff ===
==== Changes to jail operations ====
During his term as Sheriff, Arpaio began to serve inmates spoiled food and limited meal times to twice a day.

Arpaio banned inmates from possessing "sexually explicit material" including Playboy magazine, after female officers complained that inmates openly masturbated while viewing them, or harassed the officers by comparing their anatomy to the nude photographs in the publications. The ban was challenged on First Amendment grounds but upheld by the United States Court of Appeals for the Ninth Circuit.

In February 2007, Arpaio instituted an in-house radio station he calls KJOE. Arpaio's radio station broadcasts classical music, opera, Frank Sinatra hits, American patriotic music, and educational programming. It operates from the basement of the county jail for five days a week, four hours each day.

In March 2007, the Maricopa County Jail hosted "Inmate Idol", a takeoff on the popular television series American Idol.

Starting in July 2000, the Maricopa County Sheriff's website hosted “Jail Cam”, a 24-hour Internet webcast of images from cameras in the Madison Street Jail, a facility which processed and housed pretrial detainees. The goals of the broadcasts were the deterrence of future crime and improved public scrutiny of jail procedures. The cameras showed arrestees being brought in handcuffed, fingerprinted, booked, and taken to holding cells; with the site receiving millions of hits per day. Twenty-four former detainees brought suit against the Sheriff's office, arguing that their Fourteenth Amendment rights of due process had been violated.

Under Arpaio, the Maricopa County Jails have lost accreditation multiple times. In September 2008, the National Commission on Correctional Health Care (NCCHC) terminated the accreditation of all Maricopa County Sheriff's Office jails for failure to maintain compliance with national standards, and providing false information about such compliance. In October 2008, judge Neil V. Wake of the United States District Court for the District of Arizona ruled that grossly inadequate conditions at the Maricopa County Jail, overseen by Arpaio, are unconstitutional and jeopardize the health and safety of prisoners.

==== Tent City ====
Arpaio set up a "tent city" as an extension of the Maricopa County Jail (33°25′40″N 112°07′26″W). Tent City was located in a yard next to a more permanent structure containing toilets, showers, an area for meals, and a day room. It has become notable particularly because of Phoenix, Arizona's extreme temperatures. Daytime temperatures inside the tents have been reported as high as 150 °F (65 °C) in the top bunks.

During the summer of 2003, when outside temperatures exceeded 110 °F (43 °C), which is higher than average, Arpaio said to complaining inmates, "It's 120 degrees in Iraq and the soldiers are living in tents, have to wear full body armor, and they didn't commit any crimes, so shut your mouths." Inmates were given permission to wear only their pink underwear.

==== Mesa Hilton ====
Arpaio also maintains a facility called The Maricopa County Southeast Jail Facility. According to a news report from the Phoenix New Times, this facility has been in use since 2004 as an alternative to the Tent City. This facility has been alleged by the Phoenix New Times to be for celebrities and friends of Arpaio only. This facility is full of amenities and dubbed the "Mesa Hilton" as it is in stark contrast to the Tent City set up for normal inmates. It is where Adam Stoddard, a Deputy of Arpaio who stole confidential documents from an attorney's file, spent his time for contempt of court.

==== Volunteer chain gangs ====
In 1995, Arpaio reinstituted chain gangs. In 1996, Arpaio expanded the chain gang concept by instituting female volunteer chain gangs. Female inmates work seven hours a day (7 a.m. to 2 p.m.), six days a week. He has also instituted the world's first all-juvenile volunteer chain gang; volunteers earn high school credit toward a diploma.

==== Pink underwear ====
One of Arpaio's most visible public relations actions was the introduction of pink underwear, which the Maricopa County Sheriff's website cites as being "world famous." Arpaio subsequently started to sell customized pink boxer shorts (with the Maricopa County Sheriff's logo and "Go Joe") as a fund-raiser for the Sheriff's Posse Association. Despite allegations of misuse of funds received from these sales, Arpaio declined to provide an accounting for the money.

Arpaio's success in gaining press coverage with the pink underwear resulted in him extending the use of the color. He introduced pink handcuffs, using the event to promote his book, Sheriff Joe Arpaio, America's Toughest Sheriff.

==== Arresting critics ====
In 2008, when Phoenix Mayor Phil Gordon called for a federal investigation into Arpaio's immigration enforcement tactics, Arpaio's office responded by demanding the mayor's emails and phone logs. Arpaio also had his critic Maricopa County Supervisor Don Stapley, a Republican, arrested on suspicion of failing to properly disclose business interests. Stapley agreed to a $3.5 million settlement in his lawsuit against Arpaio, Thomas, and the county for false arrest.

=== Immigration enforcement ===
In 2005, the Arizona State Legislature passed a state law making it a felony, punishable by up to two years in prison, to smuggle illegal immigrants across the border. While already a federal crime, Arizona's law, also known as the “Coyote law”, made it legal for local police to enforce immigration law and also classified persons being smuggled as co-conspirators subject to penalties as laid out in the law.

Arpaio instructed his sheriff's deputies and members of his civilian posse to arrest illegal aliens. Arpaio told The Washington Times, "My message is clear: if you come here and I catch you, you're going straight to jail.... I'm not going to turn these people over to federal authorities so they can have a free ride back to Mexico. I'll give them a free ride to my jail."

On March 3, 2009, the United States Department of Justice "notified Arpaio of the investigation in a letter saying his enforcement methods may unfairly target Hispanics and Spanish-speaking people" Arpaio denied any wrongdoing and stated that he welcomed the investigation, and would cooperate fully. By May 2009, Arpaio had hired a Washington, D.C. lobbyist, who wrote to Obama administration officials, suggesting that the decision to probe Arpaio had been driven by political rivalries and score settling. In July 2009, Arpaio publicly stated that he would not cooperate with the investigation.

In October 2009, the Department of Homeland Security removed the authority of Arpaio's 160 federally trained deputies to make immigration arrests in the field. Despite the actions of the Department of Homeland Security, Arpaio maintained that he will still pursue illegal aliens under Arizona state law. As of 2012 and beyond, he continued to do so.

=== Improper clearance of MCSO cases ===
Reports claim that, under Arpaio, the MCSO may be improperly clearing as many as 75% of cases without arrest or proper investigation. The sheriff's office failed to properly investigate serious crimes, including the rape of a 14-year-old girl by classmates, the rape of a 15-year-old girl by two strangers, and the rape of a 13-year-old girl by her father. These cases were "exceptionally cleared" without investigation or even identifying a suspect in one case which are not in accordance with the FBI standards for exceptional clearance. In the case of the 15-year-old girl, the case was closed within one month and before DNA testing was even complete. In the case of the 13-year-old, the case was closed because her mother did not want to "...pursue this investigation". In the case of the 14-year-old, the case was closed because a suspect declined to come in for questioning. In a statement to ABC15, the Sheriff's Office claimed, "The Goldwater Institute's report cites the FBI's Uniform Code Reporting handbook, which is a voluntary crime-reporting program to compile statistical information and reports. The UCR is not intended for oversight on how law enforcement agencies clear cases...The Sheriff's Office has its own criteria for clearing cases."

In an interview on the ABC Nightline news program, when asked to explain why 82 percent of cases were declared cleared by exception, Arpaio said "We do clear a higher percentage of that. I know that. We clear many, many cases—not 18 percent." Nightline contacted the MCSO after the interview and was told that of 7,346 crimes, only 944, or 15%, had been cleared by arrest.

=== Webcasts of pretrial detainees ===
Starting in July 2000, the MCSO's website hosted Jail Cam, a 24-hour Internet webcast of images from cameras in the Madison Street Jail, a facility which processed and housed only pretrial detainees. The stated goals of the broadcasts were the deterrence of future crime and improved public scrutiny of jail procedures. The cameras showed arrestees being brought in handcuffed, fingerprinted, booked, and taken to holding cells; with the site receiving millions of hits per day. Twenty-four former detainees brought suit against the MCSO, arguing that their Fourteenth Amendment rights of due process had been violated.

U.S. District Court Judge Earl H. Carroll held in favor of the former detainees, issuing an injunction ending the webcasts. By a two to one vote, a three-judge panel of the United States Court of Appeals for the Ninth Circuit upheld the injunction, with the majority opinion stating:

... Second, Sheriff Arpaio argues that the cameras are justified by the County's interest in having its pretrial detention centers open to public scrutiny. We have given prison officials wide latitude in administering pretrial detention facilities, in guaranteeing detainees’ attendance at trial, and in promoting prison safety. But we fail to see how turning pretrial detainees into the unwilling objects of the latest reality show serves any of these legitimate goals. As the Supreme Court has recognized, "[i]nmates ... are not like animals in a zoo to be filmed and photographed at will by the public or by media reporters, however ‘educational’ the process may be for others.

In his dissenting opinion, Circuit Judge Carlos Bea wrote:

... What the majority avoids—perhaps because of the all-too-predictable result—is to ask the question basic to any review questioning the validity of governmental action under a rational basis analysis: were the webcasts reasonably related to the purpose of deterring public behavior that could result in pretrial detention? The answer clearly is Yes. ... Similarly unexamined is the Sheriff's purpose of providing transparency of jail operations as a civic good.

Sheriff Arpaio's methods to achieve his purposes of public deterrence and governmental transparency may not suit the fine sensibilities of some group advocates and jurists. But absent a violation of the constitutional rights of Plaintiffs—and I see none—such differences of opinion must be vindicated, if at all, in the ballot box, not in the courtroom.

The Supreme Court of the United States refused to hear an appeal of the case. Ultimately, Maricopa County was required to pay the detainees' legal costs and damages.

=== Inmate complaints and lawsuits ===
From 2004 through November 2007, Arpaio was the target of 2,150 lawsuits in U.S. District Court and hundreds more in Maricopa County courts, with more than $50 million in claims being filed, fifty times as many prison-conditions lawsuits as the New York City, Los Angeles, Chicago, and Houston jail systems combined. Allegations of cruel treatment of inmates as well as living conditions have been cited by Amnesty International in a report issued on the treatment of inmates in Maricopa County facilities.

=== Recidivism ===
In 1998, Arpaio commissioned a study, by Arizona State University criminal justice professor Marie L. Griffin, to examine recidivism rates based on conditions of confinement. Comparing recidivism rates under Arpaio to those under his predecessor, the study found "there was no significant difference in recidivism observed between those offenders released in 1989–1990 and those released in 1994–1995."

=== Inmate deaths and injuries ===
Family members of inmates who have died or been injured in jail custody have filed lawsuits against the MCSO. Maricopa County paid more than $43 million in settlement claims during Arpaio's tenure.

==== Charles Agster ====
In August 2001, Charles Agster, a 33-year-old mentally handicapped man, died in the county jail, three days after being forced by sheriff's officers into a restraint chair used for controlling combative arrestees. Agster's parents had been taking him to a psychiatric hospital because he was exhibiting paranoia, then called police when he refused to leave a convenience store where they had stopped en route. Officers took Agster to the Madison Street jail, placed a spit hood over his face and strapped him to the chair, where he had an apparent seizure and lost consciousness. He was declared brain dead three days later. A medical examiner later concluded that Agster died of complications of methamphetamine intoxication. In a subsequent lawsuit, an attorney for the MCSO described the amount of methamphetamine in Agster's system as 17 times the known lethal dose. The lawsuit resulted in a $9 million jury verdict against the county, the MCSO, and Correctional Health Services.

==== Scott Norberg ====
One major controversy includes the 1996 death of inmate Scott Norberg, a former American football wide receiver for Brigham Young University, who died while in custody of the MCSO. Norberg was arrested for assaulting a police officer in Mesa, Arizona, after neighbors in a residential area had reported a delirious man walking in their neighborhood. Arpaio's office repeatedly claimed Norberg was also high on methamphetamine, but a blood toxicology performed post-mortem was inconclusive. According to a toxological report, Norberg did have methamphetamine in his urine, though "there would be no direct effect caused by the methamphetamine on Norberg's behavior at the time of the incident". During his internment, evidence suggests detention officers shocked Norberg several times with a stun-gun. According to an investigation by Amnesty International, Norberg was already handcuffed and face down when officers dragged him from his cell and placed him in a restraint chair with a towel covering his face. After Norberg's corpse was discovered, detention officers accused Norberg of attacking them as they were trying to restrain him. The cause of his death, according to The Maricopa County Medical Examiner, was due to "positional asphyxia". Sheriff Arpaio investigated and subsequently cleared detention officers of any criminal wrongdoing.

Norberg's parents filed a lawsuit against Arpaio and the MCSO. The lawsuit was settled for $8.25 million (USD).

==== Richard Post ====
Richard Post was a paraplegic inmate arrested in 1996 for possession of marijuana and criminal trespass. Post was placed in a restraint chair by guards and his neck was broken in the process. The event, caught on video, shows guards smiling and laughing while Post is being injured. Because of his injuries, Post has lost much of the use of his arms. Post settled his claims against the MCSO for $800,000.

==== Brian Crenshaw ====
Brian Crenshaw was a legally blind and mentally disabled inmate who suffered fatal injuries while being held in Maricopa County Jail for shoplifting. The injuries that led to his death were initially blamed on a fall from his bunk but were later discovered to have been the result of a brutal beating by jail guards on March 7, 2003. A lawsuit filed in The Maricopa County Superior Court of Arizona by the lawyer for Crenshaw's family stated:

An external examination report of The Maricopa County Medical Examiner's Office concluded that Brian's death was caused by "complications of blunt force trauma due to a fall." This conclusion was reached largely on the Maricopa County Sheriff's Office's relation of their "history" of Brian's injuries to the Medical Examiner's Office; a history that included the MCSO's implausible story that all of Brian's injuries were caused by a fall from his cell bed. The Maricopa County Medical Examiner conducted no autopsy; nor was the Maricopa County Medical Examiner informed by MCSO or The Maricopa County Correctional Health Services about Brian's beating on March 7, 2003 and/or related events. An independent autopsy report later narrowed the cause of Brian's death to peritonitis and sepsis secondary to the duodenal perforation. A fall from Brian's 4-foot, 2 inch bunk could not have simultaneously caused a broken neck, broken toes, and a duodenal perforation.

The lawsuit against Arpaio and the MCSO resulted in an award of $2 million. As in the Scott Norberg case, it was alleged that Arpaio's office destroyed evidence in the case. In the Crenshaw case, the attorney who represented the case before a jury alleged digital video evidence was destroyed.

=== Conflicts with local news media ===
In July 2004, The Phoenix New Times published Arpaio's home address in the context of a story about his real estate dealings. In October 2007, a Maricopa County special prosecutor served Village Voice Media, the Phoenix New Times' corporate parent, with a subpoena ordering it to produce "all documents" related to the original real estate article, as well as the IP addresses of all visitors to the Phoenix New Times website since January 1, 2004. The Phoenix New Times then published the contents of the subpoena on October 18. Phoenix New Times editors Michael Lacey and Jim Larkin were arrested and jailed by Maricopa Sheriff's Deputies on misdemeanor charges of revealing grand jury secrets after the publication of the subpoena. On the following day, the county attorney dropped the case and fired the special prosecutor. In a subsequent lawsuit, Lacey and Larkin won $3.75 million in damages for false arrest.

On November 28, 2007, it was ruled that the subpoenas were not validly issued and in April 2008, the New Times editors filed suit against Arpaio, County Attorney Andrew Thomas and Special Prosecutor Dennis Wilenchik.

In 2009, The East Valley Tribune ran a series of articles that criticized the Maricopa County sheriff for a decline in normal police protection due to an increased focus towards arresting illegal immigrants. The five-part series titled “Reasonable Doubt,” which received a Pulitzer Prize for Local Reporting, described "slow emergency response times and lax criminal enforcement."

On December 23, 2009, The Arizona Republic published an editorial titled “The Conspiracy that won't stop.” The editorial board referenced a published letter written by the Yavapai County Attorney, Sheila Polk, titled “Arpaio, Thomas are abusing power” ” in which Polk was critical of Arpaio. The Editorial Board claimed that “As a result of stepping forward, Polk now may join the fast-growing list of Arizona public officials forced to defend themselves against criminal investigations for the "crime" of having upset Arpaio and Thomas.”

=== Critical organizations ===
Arpaio's practices have been criticized by organizations such as Amnesty International, the American Civil Liberties Union, the Arizona Ecumenical Council, the American Jewish Committee, and the Arizona chapter of the Anti-Defamation League. The editorial board of The New York Times called Arpaio "America's Worst Sheriff".

== Lawsuits filed by Arpaio and the MCSO ==
On December 2, 2009, County Attorney Andrew Thomas and Sheriff Arpaio filed a federal lawsuit alleging racketeering charges against four judges, as well as various private attorneys, all current members of the Maricopa County Board of Supervisors and some county managers.

On March 11, 2010, Arpaio announced that “the Department of Justice Office of Public Integrity in Washington, D.C. has agreed to review allegations of corruption involving the Maricopa County Board of Supervisors and judicial officials and others. RICO complaints previously filed by the Maricopa County Sheriff's Office and the Maricopa County Attorney's Office were formally withdrawn so as not to duplicate or hinder the Department of Justice review or any additional investigation necessary.”

On March 13, 2010, in a letter sent to Arpaio's lawyer, Robert Driscoll of Alston & Bird, Raymond N. Hulser, Acting Chief, Public Integrity Section Criminal Division of the U.S. Department of Justice, responded that he was "dismayed to learn that (the Sheriff's Office's) mere referral of information to the Public Integrity Section was cited and relied upon in a pleading in federal court, and then used as a platform for a press conference." Husler also noted in this letter that no review of the materials would be undertaken by the Public Integrity Section.

In a subsequent lawsuit filed by the targets of the RICO action, U.S. District Judge Neil V. Wake called the RICO action "patently frivolous" and ruled that Arpaio and Thomas were not immune from civil liability. Several millions of dollars in awards and settlements resulted from this lawsuit, including $1.27 million to retired Superior Court Judge Gary Donahoe and $975,000 to former County Supervisor Mary Rose Wilcox.
