= Agnos (surname) =

Agnos is a surname. Notable people with the surname include:

- Art Agnos (born 1938), American politician
- Tom Agnos (1936–2004), American law enforcement officer
- Zach Agnos (born 2000), American Major League Baseball player

== See also ==
- Agno (disambiguation)
