= Agoos =

Agoos is a surname. Notable people with the surname include:

- Brad Agoos (born 1970/1971), American soccer player and coach
- Jeff Agoos (born 1968), American soccer player
- Julie Agoos (born 1956), American poet

== See also ==
- Agnos (surname)
