= Paul Penzone =

Arizona sheriff (born 1967)

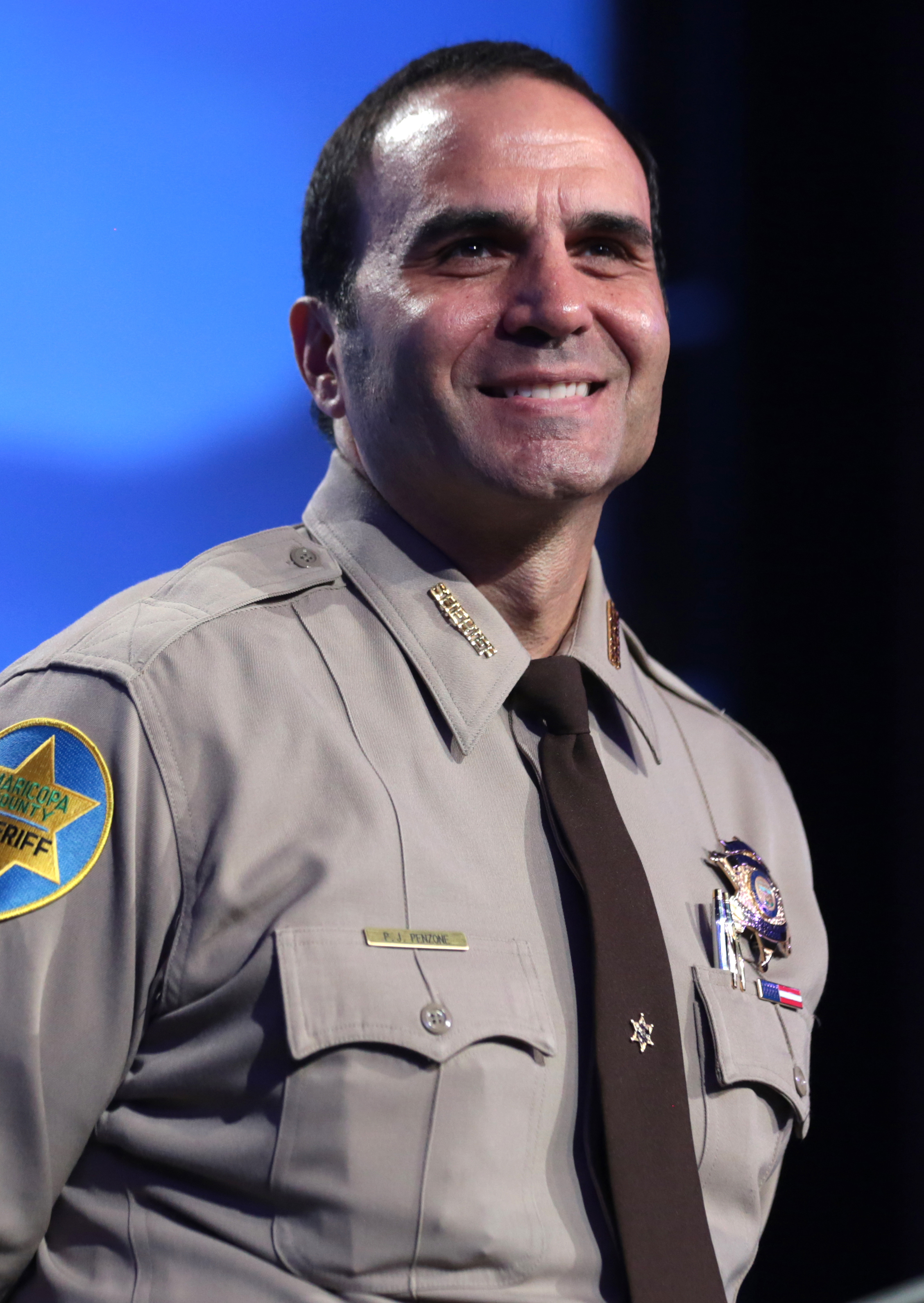

37th Sheriff of Maricopa County
- In office January 1, 2017 – January 12, 2024
- Preceded by: Joe Arpaio
- Succeeded by: Russ Skinner; Jerry Sheridan

Personal details
- Born: March 29, 1967 (age 59) Trenton, New Jersey, U.S.
- Party: Democratic
- Education: Glendale Community College; Northern Arizona University

Paul Penzone (born March 29, 1967) is a former American law enforcement officer. He was the sheriff of Maricopa County, Arizona, United States. Penzone was elected sheriff in 2016, defeating longtime incumbent Joe Arpaio. Penzone is a former sergeant in the Phoenix Police Department.

== Early life and education ==
Penzone was born in Trenton, New Jersey. He is the son of Rose and Charlie Penzone, and is of Italian descent. Penzone went to Phoenix's Cortez High School and studied criminal justice at Glendale Community College and Northern Arizona University.

== Phoenix police officer ==
Penzone joined the Phoenix Police Department in 1988, and served for 21 years. For seven years, Penzone ran the Phoenix Police Department's "Silent Witness" program, which encouraged witnesses to report crimes. Penzone ran the program during the high-profile "Baseline Killer" and "Serial Shooter" investigations. Penzone created a Spanish-language version of the program.

After retiring from the police force, Penzone joined the non-profit group Childhelp as vice president. The group focuses on preventing child abuse and neglect.

== Maricopa County Sheriff ==
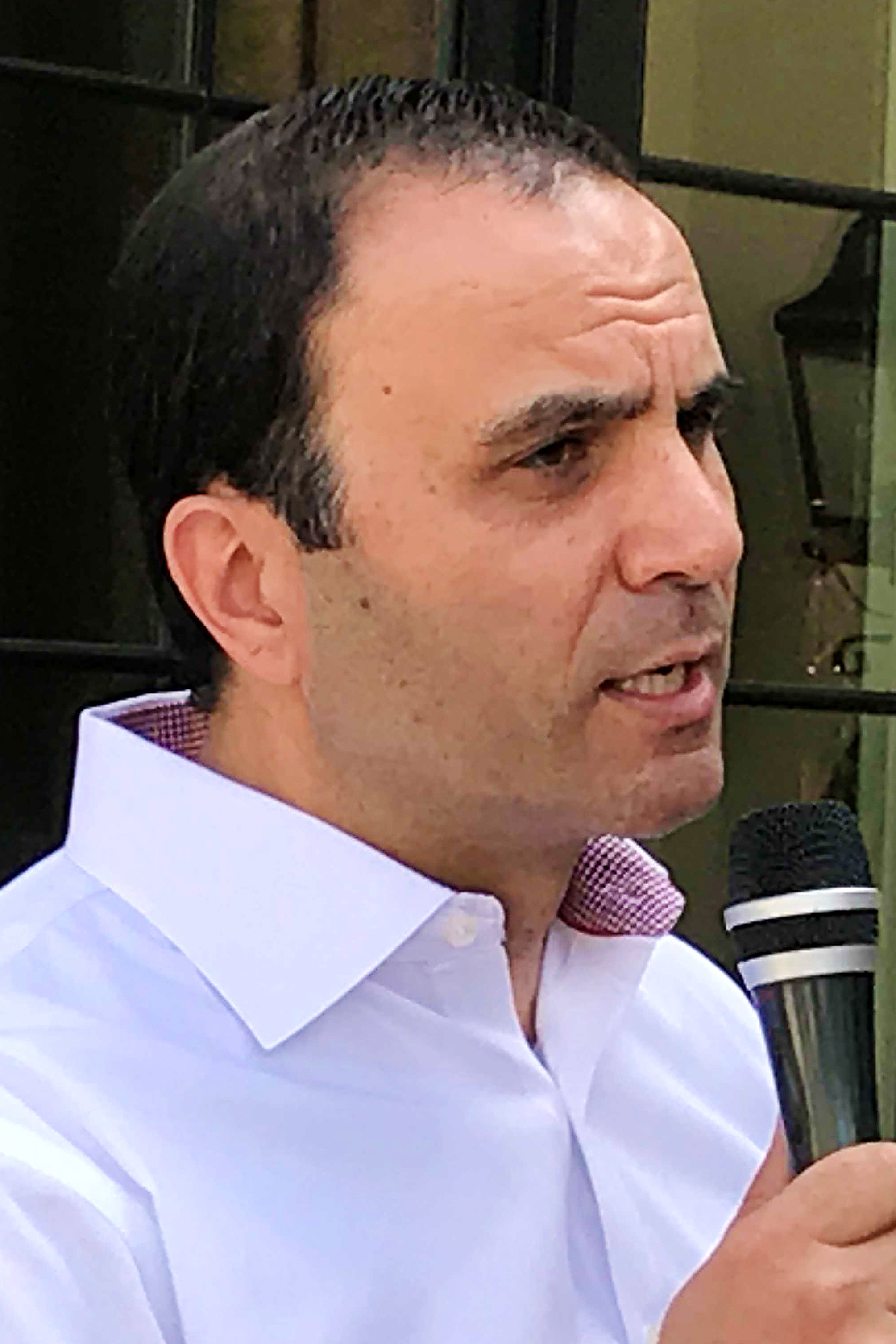
Penzone in 2018

Penzone, a Democrat, made his first bid for elected office in an unsuccessful campaign for Maricopa County sheriff in 2012 against incumbent Republican Joe Arpaio. In that election (in which Arpaio outspent Penzone by an eight-to-one margin), Arpaio received 50.7% of the vote to Penzone's 44.7%, with independent candidate Mike Stauffer running a distant third.

In 2016, Penzone again ran against Arpaio, who at that point had been in office for 24 years (six terms). In the Democratic primary election, Penzone initially faced former Arizona Department of Corrections supervisor Joe Rodriguez, but Rodriguez withdrew from the race in April 2016 and threw his support behind Penzone "to defeat Sheriff Arpaio in November for the good of Maricopa County citizens." In 2016 Penzone received a campaign finance contribution of $2,000,000 from a George Soros-funded PAC, Maricopa Strong.

In the November 2016 general election, Penzone defeated Arpaio by 665,478 votes (55.6%) to Arpaio's 531,674 votes (44.4%). During his campaign, Penzone pledged "to refocus the agency on law enforcement and rein in taxpayer dollars previously spent on civil-rights lawsuits." Arpaio, a controversial figure, had been criminally charged with contempt of court for disregarding a court order to halt the racial profiling of Latinos. Penzone called Arpaio's conduct leading to the contempt charge "unforgivable." During the campaign—which the Arizona Republic described as "an intense, nasty race"—Penzone sued Arpaio for defamation over an attack ad that Arpaio ran.

Penzone pledged to run the sheriff's office in a nonpartisan manner. To that end, he promised to reverse several of Arpaio's "unorthodox and divisive" practices (see Maricopa County Sheriff's Office controversies), which Penzone considers to be publicity stunts, such as forcing jail inmates to wear pink underwear and "investigating" President Obama's birth certificate. Penzone also said that he would scale back the use of inmate chain gangs and review Tent City (an area of the jail housing inmates in military-style tents).

After his election, as sheriff-elect, Penzone chose a new leadership team within the sheriff's office. Penzone took office on January 1, 2017.

In April 2017, Penzone announced that per a recommendation from an advisory committee, he was shutting down Tent City. He believed the facility was a "circus" that did not effectively deter crime. Tent City operations were phased out over six months; it closed in October 2017.

In 2020, Penzone won reelection over Republican Jerry Sheridan, a longtime aide to Arpaio, again winning by a double-digit margin.

In November 2022, Judge G. Murray Snow, the Chief Judge for the United States District Court of Arizona, held Penzone in contempt of court in the same case Arpaio was held in contempt of court. Snow stated Penzone, "does not demonstrate that he has taken all reasonable steps to comply with the order, especially as the backlog has increased. The backlog, despite Sheriff Penzone’s knowledge of it, only gets worse.” Penzone filed an appeal against the contempt finding.

Penzone resigned the office of sheriff as of January 12, 2024.

Civic offices
Preceded by Joe Arpaio	Sheriff of Maricopa County; 2017–2024	Succeeded by Jerry Sheridan
