= Rick Romley =

Maricopa County Attorney (born 1949)

25th and 27th County Attorney of Maricopa County
- In office April 6, 2010 – November 3, 2010; Interim
- Preceded by: Andrew Thomas
- Succeeded by: Bill Montgomery
- In office January 1989 – January 3, 2005
- Preceded by: Tom Collins
- Succeeded by: Andrew Thomas

Personal details
- Born: April 28, 1949 (age 77) Tucson, Arizona, U.S.
- Party: Republican
- Education: Arizona State University, Tempe (BA, JD)
- Awards: Purple Heart

Military service
- Allegiance: United States of America
- Branch/service: United States Marine Corps
- Battles/wars: Vietnam War

Richard M. Romley (born April 28, 1949) is an American lawyer and politician. As a Republican, he served as the County Attorney for Maricopa County, Arizona from 1989 to 2004 and again in 2010.

== Early life ==
A veteran of the Vietnam War, serving in the United States Marine Corps, he received numerous commendations for his service in that war, including the Purple Heart medal. He was severely wounded by a land mine, losing both legs above the knee and suffering other injuries. Following the war, Romley went to Arizona State University in Tempe as a business management student, and graduated in 1974. He later attended ASU's law school and attained his Juris Doctor degree in 1981.

== Career highlights ==
Romley was elected Maricopa County attorney in 1989. One of his highest publicized cases was his prosecution of the AzScam scandal of the early 1990s. In 2002, he initiated an investigation of the Roman Catholic Diocese of Phoenix and its part in the Catholic sex abuse cases, that led to an admission of wrongdoing by the then-Bishop Thomas O'Brien. Romley also prosecuted Ray Krone for the murder of Kim Ancona. Krone, who had no prior criminal record, was convicted and sentenced to death. After spending ten years in prison, four on Death Row, Krone was freed after DNA conclusively proved that he was innocent. Romley defended his prosecution of Ray Krone by saying there was "strong circumstantial evidence" of his guilt. In response to the conclusive proof that an innocent Ray Krone spent 10 1/2 years in prison, four of which was spent on Arizona's death row, Prosecutor Romley said, "we will try to do better." He neglected to mention that the prosecution's concealment of the odontologist's report that cast doubt on Ray's guilt prior to his first trial indicates they may have knowingly prosecuted an innocent man. (See: "Twice Wrongly Convicted of Murder - Ray Krone Is Set Free After 10 Years" by Hans Sherrer, Justice Denied Magazine, Vol. 2, Issue 9.)

In 2001, he received the Disabled American Veterans' (DAV) Outstanding Disabled Veteran of the Year Award.

After leaving the county attorney's post, Romley served as a special advisor to the Arizona Attorney General for six months. In August 2007, he became a personal advisor to James Nicholson, Secretary of Veterans Affairs, in Washington, D.C. In April 2010 the Board of Supervisors appointed him as Interim Maricopa County Attorney when Andrew Thomas resigned amid ethics investigations from that position to run for the office of Attorney General of Arizona, making Romley only the third interim ever since 1912, following Donald Harris in 1976 and Phil MacDonnell (Andrew Thomas' Chief Deputy) in 2010.

Romley's success as the interim county attorney came to an end on August 24, 2010, when Bill Montgomery beat Romley in the Republican primary. Rick Romley ended his appointed term on November 3, 2010.

== See also ==
- Richard Romley on IMDb
