= Jerry Sheridan =

Arizona sheriff (born 1967)

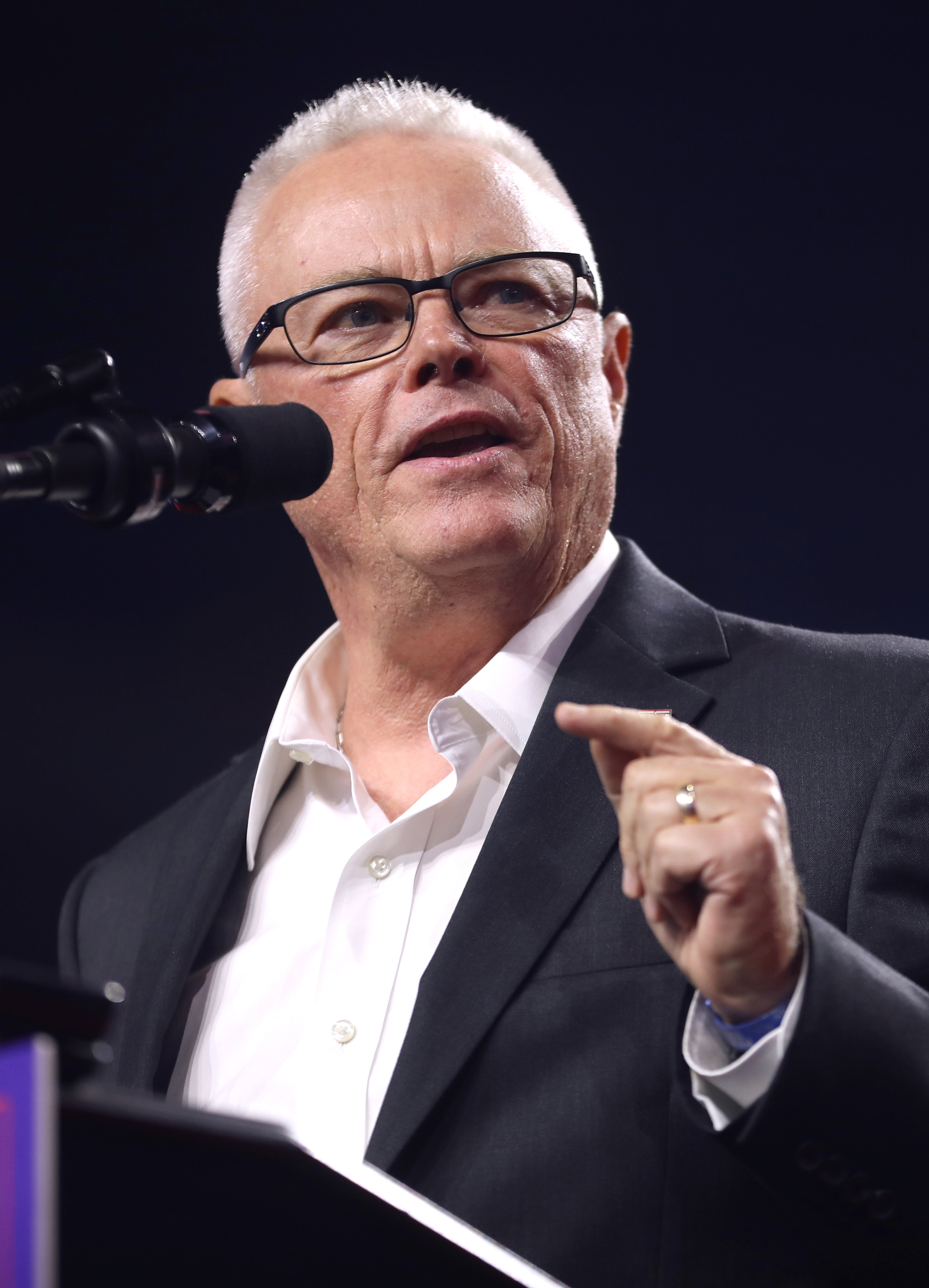

39th Sheriff of Maricopa County
- Incumbent
- Assumed office January 1, 2025
- Preceded by: Russ Skinner; Paul Penzone

Personal details
- Born: Queens, New York, U.S.
- Party: Republican

Jerry Sheridan is an American law enforcement officer who currently serves as the sheriff of Maricopa County, Arizona, United States. Sheridan was elected sheriff in 2024. Sheridan was previously Chief Deputy to Sheriff Joe Arpaio during his tenure at the Maricopa County Sheriff's Office.

== Early life and education ==
Sheridan was born in Queens, New York. In 1977, Sheridan entered the Maricopa County Sheriff's Office Reserve Deputy Academy, and he was hired as a detention officer, and eventually a Deputy Sheriff after attending the Phoenix Police Academy.

== Career ==
In 1993, Sheridan was promoted to the rank of Captain and was assigned to the third district in the northwestern part of Maricopa County, which includes the communities of Sun City, Sun City West and Wickenburg. The next year he was moved to District 4, which contains the northeastern part of the county. Several years later, he was promoted to Chief of Patrol by Sheriff Joe Arpaio, and later Chief of Custody. He worked under four Sheriffs during his time as a Deputy Sheriff.

In 2010, Sheriff Arpaio appointed Sheridan as his Chief Deputy. While working for Arpaio, Sheridan was found in civil contempt of court in connection with the Melendres racial profiling lawsuit.

In 2020, he ran for Sheriff against Paul Penzone, but lost 44.4% to 55.6%. In 2024, Sheridan ran for Sheriff of Maricopa County, defeating two other Republicans in the primary, and Democrat Tyler Kamp in the general election, 53.4% to 46.6%.

Sheridan has said that his sheriff's department has eliminated racial bias that characterized the department under his predecessor, Joe Arpaio. However, a 2026 review by ProPublica showed continued disparities affecting Latino drivers under Sheridan's tenure.

Civic offices
Preceded by Russ Skinner	Sheriff of Maricopa County; 1/1/2025–present	Incumbent
