= Andrew Thomas (American politician) =

American politician (born 1966)

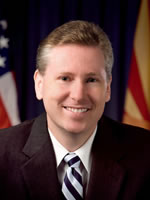

26th County Attorney of Maricopa County
- In office January 3, 2005 – April 6, 2010
- Preceded by: Rick Romley
- Succeeded by: Rick Romley

Personal details
- Born: 1966 (age 59–60) Long Beach, California, U.S.
- Party: Republican
- Education: University of Missouri (BA); Harvard University (JD)

Andrew Peyton Thomas (born 1966) is an American politician, author and former attorney. He was the county attorney for Maricopa County in Arizona from 2004 until April 6, 2010. During his term in office, he was known for his anti-illegal immigrant policies. On April 10, 2012, Thomas was disbarred by a disciplinary panel of the Arizona State Supreme Court for his actions as county attorney.

== Early life and education ==
Thomas was born in Long Beach, California, in 1966 and spent most of his childhood in Missouri's Ozarks. He graduated with a Bachelor of Arts in political science from the University of Missouri in 1988 and earned his Juris Doctor from Harvard Law School in 1991.

== Early career ==
Thomas moved to Arizona to join a law firm in Phoenix, where he practiced civil litigation, and left in 1994 to be Assistant Attorney General for Arizona, followed by posts as deputy counsel and criminal justice policy advisor to governor Fife Symington III. Thomas later became chief attorney at the Arizona Department of Corrections.

In 2002, Thomas easily won the Republican nomination for Arizona Attorney General, but lost the general election to Terry Goddard, though he managed to make waves with strong stands against crime, abortion and, especially, illegal immigration.

Thomas joined the Maricopa County Attorney's Office as a Deputy County Attorney in 2003, then ran successfully for Maricopa County Attorney in 2004, having campaigned for state-based laws and initiatives against illegal immigration, pledging to pursue "fetal homicide" cases, and opposing same-sex marriage. He took office in January 2005, with virtually no prosecutorial experience.

== Maricopa County Attorney ==
=== Elections ===
Thomas ran for Maricopa County Attorney in 2004 on a platform of seeking tougher sentences for violent criminals and stopping illegal immigration. He posted the phrase "Stop Illegal Immigration" on his campaign road signs.

Thomas faced the Democrat Don Harris in the general election. Thomas was endorsed by The Arizona Republic newspaper, the outgoing Maricopa County Attorney Rick Romley, then Phoenix mayor Phil Gordon, and the former Arizona Attorney General Grant Woods. Thomas won the election easily, with over 58% of the votes cast.

In his 2008 re-election bid, Thomas faced Democrat Tim Nelson. Thomas lost many of his 2004 endorsers. The Arizona Republic wrote "Thomas simply has worn his intensely partisan Republican politics too boldly on his sleeve. Nowhere has that partisanship been more in evidence than in his rabid pursuit of the small fry of illegal immigration, the petty hoodlums and the traffic violators." Rick Romley stated "Police chiefs tell me that the Maricopa County attorney's relationships with their police agencies are at an all-time low. And people are fearful that they are being targeted just because of the color of their skin." Thomas still won the election decisively, beating Nelson by an over 7% margin.

=== Policies ===
As a candidate for Maricopa County Attorney, Andrew Thomas campaigned on "tough on crime, tough on illegal immigration" principles, and promised to stop illegal immigration. As Maricopa County Attorney, Thomas also focused on the rights of crime victims, and adopted tough policies on violent crime, child exploitation, identity theft and repeat offenders. During his time in office, he lobbied for and helped pass legislative bills targeting identity theft, human smuggling, control of methamphetamine, crimes against unborn children and victims' rights.

==== Illegal immigration ====
As Maricopa County Attorney, Thomas kept the issue of illegal immigration at the forefront of Arizona politics.

Thomas prosecuted illegal immigrants as co-conspirators in smuggling themselves, under his interpretation of Arizona's 2005 human smuggling law. This practice was initially upheld by Arizona's appeals court in 2008, but was found unconstitutional by the U.S. District Court in Phoenix in 2013, with the current Maricopa County Attorney declining to appeal the ruling.

Thomas helped draft and campaigned for Proposition 100, a ballot measure aimed at denying bail to people who are in the U.S. illegally and charged with a range of felonies. During the campaign for the ballot measure, Thomas asserted that "[f]ar too many illegal immigrants accused of serious crimes have jumped bail and slipped across the border in order to avoid justice in an Arizona courtroom." Approved in 2006 by nearly 80% of the state's voters, the law was challenged by the ACLU in a 2008 class-action, and ruled unconstitutional by an en banc panel of the U.S. Ninth Circuit Court of Appeals in October, 2014.

Thomas was a strong supporter of Arizona's 2007 Legal Arizona Workers Act, a law intended to regulate the presence of illegal immigrants in the state. Sometimes called the "Employer Sanctions Law," it makes it a felony for a person to take the identity of another person, whether real or fictitious, for the purposes of obtaining employment, and provides civil penalties for employers that intentionally or knowingly employ an alien who does not have the legal right or authorization under federal law to work in the United States. After the act was signed into law, Thomas set up a web site that explained the law, and provided a form to report violations. In cooperation with Maricopa County Sheriff Joe Arpaio, Thomas' focus of enforcement was on the apprehension of unauthorized workers through workplace raids or through traffic inspections. Few charges were brought against employers.

Thomas was also an ardent supporter of Arizona SB 1070, also known as the Support Our Law Enforcement and Safe Neighborhoods Act, that at the time of passage in 2010 was the broadest and strictest anti-illegal immigration measure in recent U.S. history, but which was largely struck down by the U.S. Supreme Court in 2012.

==== Tough on Crime ====
Thomas helped draft and campaigned for Proposition 301, an Arizona ballot measure which toughened sanctions for abuse of methamphetamines, including amending Arizona law so that a person convicted for the first or second time of personal possession of methamphetamines could be sentenced to a term in jail or prison, allowing judges to use a jail term as a condition of probation to force methamphetamine users to comply with court mandated drug treatment and rehabilitation. In 2006, Proposition 301 was approved by 58% of Arizona's voters.

Thomas put in place a policy in which defendants in most cases were not given the opportunity to negotiate and plea down charges for serious offenses, but rather were required to plead to the most serious charge or face trial on that charge. The list of crimes which were not eligible for plea bargain included second degree murder, manslaughter, aggravated assault with injury or a weapon, sexual assault, arson of an occupied structure, armed robbery, first degree burglary, kidnapping, drive-by shooting, discharging a weapon at an occupied structure, and assault by prisoners with intent to incite riot.

In his first two years in office, Thomas nearly doubled the number of times his office sought the death penalty, despite the number of first-degree murder cases remaining more or less the same. In 2007, Thomas sought the death penalty in almost half of potential first-degree murder cases. This policy change contributed to a backlog of capital cases that crippled the county's public defender system. Judge Timothy Ryan, then Maricopa county's assistant presiding criminal judge, stated "We had more death-penalty cases on our plate than any jurisdiction in the nation, [such] that we didn't have enough prosecutors, judges, or qualified defense attorneys to keep things moving along at a rate that anyone could define as satisfactory." Ultimately, all but a few of the 2007 death-penalty cases brought by Thomas' office ended in guilty plea bargains to reduced charges.

==== Community outreach ====
Under Thomas, the Maricopa County Attorney's Office expanded their community outreach programs by sponsoring informational websites which published DUI offenders' photographs online, provided news roundups pertaining to regional crime, and discussed illegal immigration issues.

Immediately after starting, Thomas made major changes to the county attorney's office staffing. Among his goals was increasing diversity, and two-thirds of the new appointments were women and minorities. He was criticized for demoting two division chiefs: Paul McMurdie from appeals and Cindi Nannetti from sex crimes. Nannetti was named state prosecutor of the year in 2004 and he was particularly criticized for that move. Nannetti was replaced by Rachel Mitchell.

=== Conflict with Maricopa County Board of Supervisors and Superior Court judges ===
Thomas engaged in a high-profile conflict with the Maricopa County Board of Supervisors, who are responsible for allocating funds to his office. The dispute, in which he was joined by Sheriff Joe Arpaio, resulted in a number of lawsuits, with legal costs to the county for recent disputes exceeding US$2.6 million.

The conflict also resulted in Arpaio investigating and Thomas obtaining multiple indictments against County Supervisors Don Stapley and Mary Rose Wilcox.

Thomas originally obtained indictments on Stapley on December 2, 2008, on 118 felony and misdemeanor counts dealing primarily with financial disclosure irregularities. In an effort to mediate differences with the Board of Supervisors, Thomas transferred the case and criminal investigations to the Yavapai County Attorney's Office. All of the counts in the indictment were subsequently dismissed, as it was found that Stapley had not actually violated any County regulations regarding financial disclosures. Thomas then took the case back from the Yavapai County Attorney's office, and obtained a second indictment against Stapley, on 27 similar felony and misdemeanor counts, on December 8, 2009.

The United States Postal Service granted a request by Thomas and Arpaio to track Wilcox's mail. Using this information, Arpaio and Thomas obtained search warrants for other information and raided a company that had hired Wilcox. Thomas obtained an indictment of Wilcox, charging her with 36 felony counts related to failing to disclose business loans she took out from the business finance arm of an organization which had business before the Board of Supervisors. In February 2010, Pima County Judge John Leonardo, appointed by a special master of the Arizona Supreme Court to hear the matter, ruled that Thomas had acted unethically, and had prosecuted Wilcox for political gain and retaliation, despite conflicts of interest that should have precluded his office from prosecuting. In January 2011, After a ten-month review, Gila County Attorney Daisy Flores concluded there was insufficient evidence to pursue a criminal case against Wilcox. Wilcox sued the county and was awarded a settlement of nearly US$1 million in 2011. The Ninth Circuit Court of Appeals upheld the ruling.

Related to the Wilcox indictment, and a subsequent attempt by the MCSO to intimidate her attorney, The Arizona Republic editorialized that Thomas and Arpaio were misusing their powers to "intimidate and harass their political enemies."

In March 2009, Maricopa Superior Court Criminal Presiding Judge Gary Donahoe ruled that a conflict of interest between Thomas and the county Board of Supervisors over the investigation of a planned court tower created the "appearance of evil" for Thomas. Thomas has made many statements, both publicly and in legal filings, that judges in Maricopa County Superior Court are biased against him.

On December 1, 2009, Thomas and Arpaio announced that they "filed a federal racketeering lawsuit against the Maricopa Board of Supervisors, leading Superior Court judges [including Judge Gary Donahoe], and a private law firm shared by the Board and Court, alleging the defendants have conspired illegally to block criminal investigations and prosecutions of themselves, particularly those related to the new $341 million Superior Court Tower and Supervisor Donald Stapley Jr."

On December 9, 2009, Thomas held a press conference to announce that he had filed criminal charges against Judge Donahoe on three felony counts: bribery, obstructing a criminal investigation, and hindering prosecution. Thomas presented no evidence of actual wrongdoing on Donahoe's part, other than several rulings with which he disagreed. Thomas filed the charges without first seeking a grand jury indictment.

Subsequent to the filing of the Racketeer Influenced and Corrupt Organizations Act (RICO) suit and filing of charges against Donahoe, a number of defense attorneys filed motions in Maricopa Superior Court to disqualify the Maricopa County Attorney's office from prosecuting cases. Those motions later became moot, after the RICO suit and criminal charges against Donahoe were dropped by Thomas. (See below.)

On December 23, 2009, the Arizona Supreme Court appointed former Arizona Supreme Court Chief Justice Ruth McGregor as Special Master to administer all matters arising from the controversy.

In February 2010, Pima County Superior Court Judge John S. Leonardo ruled that:

[T]he County Attorney [Thomas] has the following conflicts of interest between his duty to impartially exercise his prosecutorial discretion; and

1) his efforts to retaliate against members of the [Maricopa County Board of Supervisors] ...for actions they allegedly carried out in concert with each other against his office and against him personally, as alleged in the civil RICO complaint;

2) his attempts to gain political advantage by prosecuting those who oppose him politically ...;

3) his political alliance with the Maricopa County Sheriff [Arpaio] who misused the power of his office to target members of the [Maricopa County Board of Supervisors] for criminal investigation;

4) his duty to provide confidential, uncompromised legal advice to members of the [Maricopa County Board of Supervisors]... on matters pertaining to the indictment [referring to Mary Rose Wilcox].

Subsequent to this ruling, which dismissed an indictment against Maricopa Supervisor Mary Rose Wilcox, Thomas announced that he was dismissing an indictment against Maricopa Supervisor Don Stapley, dismissing the federal RICO suit, and dropping the charges against Donahoe.

In August 2010, a Greenlee County judge ordered grand jury transcripts released that showed Thomas, in January 2010, had tried to indict several members of the Maricopa Board of Supervisors, as well as the Maricopa County Mangager, his assistant, an attorney working for the Board of Supervisors, and Donahoe. Based on the ruling by Judge Leonardo, Thomas, through his assistant, requested that the grand jury return the case to his office, to be forwarded to a special prosecutor. Instead, the grand jury took the rare action of ordering the inquiry ended. One of Thomas' own prosecutors had explained to the jury during orientation that to "end the inquiry" meant "the case is so bad, there's no further evidence that could be brought to you folks."

Rather than ending the inquiry, as ordered by the grand jury, Thomas held a press conference to announce that he had worked with Arpaio, and Arpaio's attorney, to refer the matter to the United States Department of Justice (DOJ) Public Integrity Section. The DOJ responded that they did not intend to review the file. Further, the acting chief of the section responded "In these circumstances, I was dismayed to learn that your mere referral of information to the Public Integrity Section was cited and relied upon in a pleading in federal court [the now-ended Arpaio/Thomas civil RICO lawsuit] and then used as a platform for a press conference."

Phoenix New Times reporter Ray Stern noted that, despite multiple press conferences and a complete set of grand jury transcripts, there is no record of Thomas having presented any evidence of bribery by Donahoe.

On May 21, 2010, Donahoe filed a notice of claim, a precursor to filing suit against Maricopa County, alleging abuse of power by Thomas and Arpaio, and demanding US$4.75 million to settle his claims.

In August 2012, the DOJ announced it was ending its investigation of Arpaio and Thomas and that no indictments would be issued, stating that they "do not believe the allegations presented to us are prosecutable as crimes."

As of June 2014, costs to Maricopa County taxpayers related to Arpaio's and Thomas' failed corruption investigations exceeded $44 million, not including county officials' investigation into the MCSO's budgeting.

==== State Bar of Arizona investigations ====
In 2008, the State Bar of Arizona launched an investigation of Thomas. In response, Thomas filed a Petition for Special Action with the Arizona Supreme Court in an effort to halt the investigation. The Arizona State Bar filed a response noting that "a lawyer who happens to be an elected public officer... cannot simply opt out of the lawyer-regulatory system claiming the privilege of his elected office." Thomas' private attorneys filed a reply on July 2, 2008. Thomas also posted a call to reform the State Bar of Arizona on the Maricopa County Attorney web site. On August 15, 2008, the Arizona Supreme Court denied his Petition for Special Action and ruled that the State Bar of Arizona could proceed with the ethics investigations against Thomas. The State Bar of Arizona dismissed those complaints in March 2009.

In March 2010, the Chief Justice of the Arizona Supreme Court, at the request of the State Bar of Arizona, appointed a special investigator to look into accusations of misconduct against Thomas, after a Pima County judge ruled that he acted unethically in investigating county supervisors for political gain.

Thomas said that the State Bar of Arizona investigation into his ethical conduct was stacked against him and orchestrated to damage his campaign for state attorney general. Officials involved in the investigation dismissed Thomas' allegations as baseless.

Thomas filed a petition with the Arizona Supreme Court in an attempt to end investigations into his ethical conduct. The court refused to end the investigation.

On December 6, 2010, the report from the Arizona Supreme Court was released, and with the recommendation that Thomas be disbarred. The report alleges 32 ethics rules violations by Thomas, involving conflicts of interest, dishonesty, misrepresentation, filing a frivolous suit, and filing charges against county officials solely to embarrass or burden them. The report also alleges that Thomas engaged in criminal conduct and "conspired... with others to injure, oppress, threaten or intimidate Judge (Gary) Donahoe" by filing a criminal complaint against him.

The investigative report was provided to a judge appointed by the Arizona Supreme Court, who made the decision to move forward with disciplinary recommendations against Thomas. The State Bar of Arizona's probable cause orders, signed by Judge Charles E. Jones, state that "Ethical violations by respondent, as described by Independent Bar Counsel, are far-reaching and numerous. Evidence thus far adduced portrays a reckless, four-year campaign of corruption and power abuse by respondent as a public official, undertaken at enormous and mostly wasteful cost to the taxpayers... Motivation for much of the alleged impropriety appears retaliatory, intended to do personal harm to the reputations of judges, county supervisors and other county officials... Actions by respondent appear intent on intimidation, focused on political gain, and appear fully disconnected from professional and prosecutorial standards long associated with the administration of justice ..." Judge Jones added a 33rd ethical violation in the probable cause orders: that Thomas failed to submit substantive responses to the investigator.

== 2010 candidacy for Arizona Attorney General ==
On April 1, 2010, Thomas announced his resignation as Maricopa County Attorney, effective April 6, 2010, as required by Arizona law in order to run for the office of Arizona Attorney General. Rick Romley, was appointed interim Maricopa County Attorney by the Maricopa Board of Supervisors. Bill Montgomery thereafter won a 2010 special election, and took office as Maricopa County Attorney in November, 2010.

After a divisive campaign leading up to the August 2010 Republican primary election for Arizona Attorney General, in which he was endorsed and supported by Maricopa County Sheriff Joe Arpaio, Thomas lost by 899 out of 552,623 total votes to Tom Horne, who went on to win the general election.

== Disbarment ==
In April 2012, a three-member panel appointed by the Arizona Supreme Court voted unanimously to disbar Thomas. The panel issued an extensive 247-page opinion discussing the decision. According to the panel, Thomas "outrageously exploited power, flagrantly fostered fear, and disgracefully misused the law" while serving as Maricopa County Attorney. The panel found "clear and convincing evidence" that Thomas and his deputy brought unfounded and malicious criminal and civil charges against political opponents, including four state judges and the state attorney general. "Were this a criminal case," the panel concluded, "we are confident that the evidence would establish this conspiracy beyond a reasonable doubt."

Thomas has denied wrongdoing, calling the bar investigation a "political witch hunt." While he had the opportunity to appeal his disbarment, he chose not to.

Disciplinary proceedings related to Thomas cost the State Bar of Arizona US$616,571, of which Thomas, with his co-defendants, agreed on a restitution repayment amount of US$101,294.

Under rules set forth by the State Bar of Arizona, Thomas is eligible for reinstatement, five years after the effective date of disbarment. Thomas was disbarred effective May 10, 2012, meaning he is eligible for reinstatement on May 10, 2017. Reinstatement is not automatic for disbarred lawyers in Arizona.

== 2014 campaign for Arizona Governor ==
In May 2014, Thomas filed nominating petitions to be placed on the Republican ballot as a candidate for Arizona Governor in the August 26, 2014 primary election. In June, 2014, Thomas qualified for US$754,000 in public election funding through the Arizona Clean Elections Commission, by showing that he had received 4,500 contributions of at least $5 each from Arizona voters. Thomas received 8.1% of the Republican primary votes, losing to Doug Ducey in a six-way election that shattered Arizona spending records.

== Personal life ==
Thomas is married to Ann Estrada Thomas, with whom he has four children.

== Books ==
- Crime and the Sacking of America: The Roots of Chaos. Brassey's. 1994. ISBN 978-0-02-881107-9.
- Fighting the Good Fight: America's "Minister of Defense" Stands Firm on What It Takes to Win God's Way. Thomas Nelson Publishers. 1999. ISBN 978-0-7852-6964-9. With Reggie White.
- Clarence Thomas: A Biography. Encounter Books. 2001. ISBN 978-1-893554-36-8.
- The People V. Harvard Law: How America's Oldest Law School Turned its Back on Free Speech. Encounter Books. 2005. ISBN 978-1-893554-98-6.
