= Agno =

Agno may refer to:

- Agno, Pangasinan
- Agno, Switzerland
- Agno River, Republic of the Philippines
- Torrente Agno, a river in Province of Vicenza, Italy
