= Tom Agnos =

Maricopa County Sheriff (1936–2004)

35th Sheriff of Maricopa County
- In office 1988–1993
- Preceded by: Richard Godbehere
- Succeeded by: Joe Arpaio

Personal details
- Born: Thomas J. Agnos; 1936 Lima, Ohio, U.S.
- Died: December 20, 2004 (aged 68) Sun City West, Arizona, U.S.
- Cause of death: Self-inflicted gunshot wound
- Party: Republican
- Spouse: Shirley Agnos
- Education: Phoenix College
- Alma mater: Arizona State University

Military service
- Allegiance: United States
- Branch/service: United States Air Force

Thomas J. Agnos (1936 – December 20, 2004) was an American law enforcement officer known for his time as the sheriff of Maricopa County, Arizona.

== Early life ==
Agnos was born in Lima, Ohio, in 1936, and had served in the United States Air Force for some time prior to moving to Arizona in 1961 to join the Phoenix Police Department. Agnos would go on to serve as Phoenix Police's assistant chief prior to winning a term as the Maricopa County Sheriff in 1988.

== Tenure as Maricopa County Sheriff ==
During his tenure as sheriff, Agnos instated 100% pay for employees who were hurt on the job, a practice that was later adopted by other agencies.

=== Controversy ===
Agnos was at the center of controversy following the Waddell Buddhist temple shooting. In the aftermath of the shooting, MCSO deputies arrested five men from Tucson, Arizona based on a tip from a psychiatric patient.

It was later discovered that the men were coerced into confessing, with investigators extracting false confessions by exaggerating evidence, badgering them with leading questions, and threatening the death penalty.

One of the five men arrested was freed after he provided an alibi, but the other four, dubbed by the media as the "Tucson Four", remained in custody even though no physical evidence linked them to the crime. Charges were eventually dismissed, and their innocence was established in late 1991 when two men were found to be the suspects responsible.

Members of the Tucson Four later filed lawsuits against Maricopa County, and in 1994, two of the people who sued received $1.1 million each, while another received $240,000. The investigation was criticized by the Maricopa County Attorney, as well as Arizona's Senator Dennis DeConcini.

For his part, Agnos said he believed the arrests were justified, and that the confessions were worthy of murder charges. Publicity generated by Agnos' handling of the temple shooting led to his defeat by Joe Arpaio in the November 1992 general election.

== Death ==
Agnos died on December 20, 2004, at his home in Sun City West. It was reported at the time that Agnos died from a self-inflicted gunshot wound, but Agnos' wife said he had been battling terminal cancer.
