= Maricopa County Sheriff's Office =

Law enforcement agency in Arizona, United States

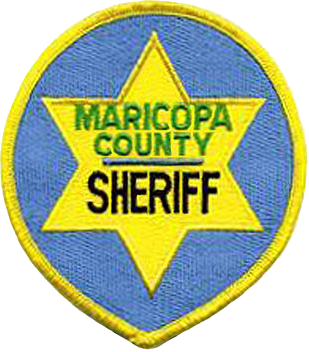
- Abbreviation: MCSO

Agency overview
- Formed: 1871
- Employees: 2,850<est>
- Volunteers: 204<est>
- Annual budget: $526m (2024)

Jurisdictional structure
- Operations jurisdiction: Maricopa County, Arizona, U.S.
- Area: 9,224 square miles (23,890 km^{2})
- Population: 4,496,588 (est 2021)
- General nature: Civilian police

Operational structure
- Headquarters: Phoenix, Arizona
- Agency executive: Jerry Sheridan, Sheriff

Facilities
- Aviation Units: One Bell 407 Helicopters, one Bell 429, one Cessna 206 Airplanes

Website
- Official Website

The Maricopa County Sheriff's Office (MCSO) is the law enforcement agency that serves Maricopa County, Arizona, and is the largest sheriff's office in Arizona. The MCSO provides patrol services and criminal investigation to unincorporated areas of the county and operates the county jail system. It serves as the primary law enforcement agency for any incorporated cities within the county that have contracted with the agency for law-enforcement services (known as "contract cities").

The county sheriff is elected by the citizens and serves as the highest law enforcement official in Maricopa County. The current Sheriff of Maricopa County is Gerard “Jerry” Sheridan, elected in November 2024. As a result of policies and practices under former sheriff Joe Arpaio the MCSO has received significant critical media coverage, federal investigation, and judicial oversight.

== Law enforcement authority ==
The MCSO does not possess a legal identity separate from Maricopa County. Deputy Sheriffs of the Maricopa County Sheriff's Office are delegated their law enforcement authority by the Sheriff of Maricopa County.

== Districts ==
Maricopa County is the fourth largest county in the United States, and has a total area of 9,224 square miles (23,900 km^{2}). The county is divided into six geographical areas, referred to as Districts, and consist of District 1, District 2, District 3, District 4, and District 7. Districts are generally staffed by a District Commander (Captain), Deputy Commander (Lieutenant), uniformed sergeants and patrol deputies, detectives, and administrative staff. Districts overlap city agencies, as the Sheriff's Office has concurrent jurisdiction in these areas.

District 1 – covers an area of approximately 1,053 square miles (2,730 km^{2}) in the southeast quadrant of the county. District One encompasses the cities of Chandler, Gilbert, Mesa, and Tempe, along with the Town of Guadalupe and CDP of Sun Lakes. District One also includes portions of the Town of Queen Creek, and the cities of Apache Junction, Scottsdale, and Phoenix, including the Ahwatukee Foothills. While District One is not the largest district in size, it is historically the busiest, averaging approximately 40% more calls for service than any of the other districts.

District 2 – covers an area of approximately 5,200 square miles (13,000 km^{2}) in the southwest quadrant of the county. District Two provides service to the rural areas of Buckeye, Laveen, Mobile, Rainbow Valley, and Tonopah, as well as to the contract cities of Gila Bend and Litchfield Park. District Two also includes portions of Avondale, Glendale, Goodyear, and Phoenix.

District 3 – covers an area of approximately 1,600 square miles (4,100 km^{2}), bordered by Northern Avenue on the south and I-17 on the east, extending to the northern and western borders of the county. District Three includes the areas of Youngtown, Sun City and Sun City West, the communities of Wittmann, Waddell, Circle City, Morristown, Whispering Ranch, Aguila, Gladden, and the unincorporated neighborhoods surrounding Peoria, Surprise, and Wickenburg.

District 4 – covers the unincorporated areas of Anthem, Desert Foothills, New River, Cave Creek, Carefree and Tonto Hills. District Four also provides law enforcement to the contract Towns of Cave Creek and Carefree.

District 7 – covers the unincorporated areas of Fountain Hills, Tonto Verde and Rio Verde. It also provides contract law enforcement services on a contract basis to the Town of Fountain Hills.

== Rank structure ==
Title	Insignia
Sheriff	
Undersheriff	
Executive Chief	
Deputy Chief	
Captain	
Lieutenant	
Sergeant	
Deputy or Detention Deputy	

The following insignia are respective of the Maricopa County Sheriff's Office Uniform Specification policy GC-20. Detectives and deputies are the same rank. Unlike other law enforcement agencies, detective is not a promotion within MCSO, but rather a different assignment.

== Specialized units ==
Lake Patrol (District 5)

In addition to patrolling the unincorporated areas, the Maricopa County Sheriff's Office is responsible for patrolling the lakes and waterways in the recreational areas within the county. The Lake Patrol Division is responsible for law enforcement services in the recreational areas of Tonto National Forest and Lake Pleasant Regional Park. This area includes Saguaro, Canyon, Apache, Bartlett and Horseshoe Lakes as well as the Lower Salt and Verde River recreational areas, Four Peaks, Superstition, Mazatzals, Camp Creek and Seven Springs recreational and wilderness areas. The total area of responsibility is over 1,000 square miles (2,600 km^{2}), which are visited by an estimated 1.5 million people every year.

Lake Patrol Division Deputy Sheriffs operate four-wheel-drive vehicles, all-terrain vehicles, patrol boats, jet skis, and air boats. Most are certified Emergency Medical Technicians and several are Paramedics. The division also has a detective section which investigates crimes, deaths and boating accidents on the lakes and rivers. The Lake Patrol Division also has a highly specialized dive team which provides underwater recovery services throughout the county.

Aviation Division

The Aviation Division provides airborne law enforcement support to uniformed patrol, Lake Patrol, Search and Rescue operations, narcotics enforcement, extraditions and SWAT operations.

The Aviation Division is staffed with a Commander, Helicopter and Fixed Wing Chief Pilot, Director of Maintenance, eight sworn Deputies, six Civilians including an Administrative Coordinator. The Division is a 24-hour-a-day 7 days a week operation and employs two helicopters and one fixed-wing aircraft.

The flagships of the division are two Bell 429 helicopters with the call signs of "Fox-1 and "Fox-2." These helicopters are equipped with FLIR (Forward Looking Infra Red), stabilized binoculars, Churchill moving map and an Trakka spotlight. These helicopters perform direct patrol, search and rescue operations, narcotics surveillance and photo missions.

For fixed wing, the division utilizes one single engine Cessna 206. The aircraft is housed at Deer Valley Airport and is used primarily for extraditing fugitives from other states. The fixed wing aircraft is also used for narcotics and smuggling surveillance missions.

K9 Unit

The Sheriff's Canine Unit includes 25 canines with various specialties, including narcotics, explosive ordnance, cadaver, and patrol. The unit's staff consists of one Sergeant, ten Deputies, five Detectives and four Detention Officers.

All canines trained in narcotic detection are capable of finding and aggressively alerting on cocaine, marijuana, methamphetamines, heroin, and their derivatives. Collectively, they have assisted in the seizure of over 5.3 million dollars in narcotic tainted monies. All canines trained in explosive ordnance detection are trained to detect and passively alert on 13 different odors. The tobacco canine is trained to find and aggressively alert on all forms of tobacco.

Canine team members typically work patrol operations during peak activity hours, usually from about 6 PM to 4 AM. They also augment SWAT operations; provide contractual services for narcotic detection at several local schools; provide narcotic and explosive ordnance detection for not only our office, but for other local, state, and federal agencies; they are on call 7 days a week 24 hours a day, and conduct over 100 public relations demonstrations annually.

The utilization of police canines provides law enforcement with a non-lethal means of apprehending dangerous criminal offenders; detecting intruders and alerting handlers to their presence; pursuing, attacking and holding criminal offenders who resist apprehension; searching and clearing buildings and large open areas for criminals; tracking lost children or other persons; detecting the presence of certain narcotics, explosives, and tobacco products; locating deceased subjects, crime scenes, and minute physical evidence; and provide a strong psychological deterrent to certain types of criminal misconduct.

M109 howitzer

The Arizona Army National Guard provided a M109 howitzer to the sheriff's office in 1999. Demilitarized, it made outings during parades until 2017 when it was resumed by the National Guard for reasons of economy.

== Posse ==
There is a permanent, organized Sheriff's Posse that provides civilian volunteer support to the sworn deputies of the Sheriff's Office. Dozens of individual posse units can be called upon for various needs, such as a Jeep posse, equine mounted units in various cities, a ham radio operator posse, a diver's posse, and an air posse of licensed pilots.

== Contract cities ==
- Town of Carefree
- Town of Cave Creek
- Town of Fountain Hills
- Town of Gila Bend
- Town of Guadalupe
- City of Litchfield Park
- Town of Youngtown

== Sheriffs ==
James R. McFadden served as Maricopa County Sheriff from 1931 to 1937

- William Hancock (1871)
- Thomas Barnum (1871)
- Thomas Warden (1871–72)
- Thomas Hayes (acting, 1872)
- Thomas Hayes (1872–74)
- George Mowry (1875–80)
- Lindley Orme (1881–84)
- Noah Broadway (1885–86)
- Andrew Halbert (1887–88)
- William Thomas Gray (1889–90)
- John Montgomery (1891–92)
- James Murphy (1893–1905)
- Lindley Orme (1895–98)
- David Murray (1899–1900)
- Samuel Stout (1901–02)
- William Cook (1903–04)
- John Elliott Walker (1905–06)
- William Cunningham (acting, 1906)
- Carl Hayden (1907–12) – last territorial sheriff
- Jefferson Davis Adams (1912–17) – first state sheriff
- William Henry Wilky (1917–18)
- John G. Montgomery (1919–23)
- Jerry Sullivan (1923–24)
- Andrew Moore (1925–26)
- Jerry Sullivan (1926–28)
- Jefferson Davis Adams (acting, 1928)
- Charles Wright (1929–31)
- James McFadden (1931–37)
- Roy Merrill (1937–39)
- Lon Jordan (1939–44)
- Jewel Jordan (acting, 1944) – first and only female sheriff
- Ernest W. "Goldie" Roach (1945–47)
- Luther C. "Cal" Boies (1946–69)
- John Mummert (1969–73)
- Paul Blubaum (1973–77)
- Jerry I. Hill (1977–85)
- Richard Godbehere (1985–89)
- Thomas J. Agnos (1989–93)
- Joe Arpaio (1993–2017)
- Paul Penzone (2017–2024)
- Russ Skinner (2024–2025)
- Jerry Sheridan (January 1, 2025 – present)

== Controversies and criticism ==
The Maricopa County Sheriff's Office has been involved in many controversial acts, lawsuits, and other operations that have been called into question, from alleged racial profiling to jail conditions. Most of them involved former Maricopa County Sheriff, Joe Arpaio, who has been criticized over a number of incidents and policies.

== In popular culture ==
Maricopa County Sheriff's Office is featured on TLC's television program Police Women of Maricopa County (2010).

== See also ==
- List of law enforcement agencies in Arizona
- Waddell Buddhist temple shooting
