= Waddell Buddhist temple shooting =

1991 mass shooting in Arizona, U.S.

- Location: 33.53064°N 112.42979°W; Waddell, Arizona, U.S.
- Date: August 9–10, 1991
- Attack type: Mass shooting; mass murder; robbery
- Weapons: Stevens 67E 20-gauge pump-action shotgun; Marlin Model 60 .22-caliber rifle
- Deaths: 9
- Perpetrators: Johnathan Doody and Allesandro Garcia
- Motive: Robbery

The Waddell Buddhist Temple Shooting occurred in the early morning of August 10, 1991, when nine people were killed in a mass shooting at Thai Buddhist temple Wat Promkunaram (Thai: วัดพรหมคุณาราม; RTGS: Wat Phrom Khunaram) in Waddell, Arizona, US.

Four suspects were arrested soon after the shooting based on a tip from a mentally ill informant who had a history of outlandish claims. Three of the four suspects made false confessions after lengthy interrogations, but the fourth maintained his innocence. These four suspects were exonerated after Johnathan Doody and Allesandro Garcia were arrested, and later found guilty of having committed the murders during a robbery. Doody and Garcia were both sentenced to over 200 years in prison. Doody's conviction was overturned, but he was found guilty after a 2014 retrial. Controversy over the false confessions and other poor handling of the investigation led to the ousting of Sheriff Tom Agnos.

== Overview ==
The shooting happened at the Wat Promkunaram Buddhist temple during the early hours of August 10. The victims were all linked to the temple and either Thais or of Thai descent: the abbot, Pairuch Kanthong; five monks, Surichai Anuttaro, Boochuay Chaiyarach, Chalerm Chantapim, Siang Ginggaeo, and Somsak Sopha; a nun, Foy Sripanpasert; her nephew, Matthew Miller, who was a novice monk; and a temple employee, Chirasak Chirapong. Their bodies were found later the same day by a cook who entered the temple.

The victims were shot in the back of the head and placed face down in a circle. 17 spent rifle casings and 4 spent shotgun shells were found at the scene.

== Investigation ==
=== Initial arrests ===
After the shooting, four men from Tucson were arrested. Mike McGraw, a patient in a mental hospital in Tucson, had called sheriff's investigators in Maricopa County, saying he knew who did it and providing names.

Three of the four men confessed in writing following extensive interrogation by Maricopa County Sheriff's Office deputies. Some of them suspects were kept awake more than 30 hours straight, and all were interrogated for long periods up to 13 hours straight – by a rotating shift of officers. The fourth suspect maintained his innocence through two extensive rounds of interrogation and was later released, after investigators finally looked into his alibi and found video evidence showing him working at a dog racing operation hundreds of miles away at the time of the murder.

It was later discovered one of the murder weapons – a Marlin Firearms .22 caliber rifle, which the Maricopa County Sheriff's Office had in its possession, but did not bother testing for nearly two months (Note: The weapon had been turned over to the Maricopa County Sheriff's Office by the U.S. Air Force Security Police of the nearby Luke Air Force Base, having been confiscated when found during a traffic stop on the base as it was the type of weapon the Sheriff's Office was looking for. The rifle was then left sitting behind a random door at the Sheriff's Office for weeks.) – was connected to two local teenagers, and had no connection whatsoever to any of the four suspects. Charges against the four, later dubbed the "Tucson Four" by the media, were dropped, resulting in a major controversy over the investigation.

=== Later arrests ===
Police found the murder weapon, a .22-caliber rifle belonging to a 16-year-old, in the car of a friend of 17-year-old Johnathan Doody, an ethnic Thai born in Nakon Nayok in Thailand. That led the investigation to Doody and 16-year-old Allesandro Garcia (born June 12, 1975). According to Garcia, he and Doody went with the .22-caliber rifle and his 20-gauge shotgun to the temple and robbed it of approximately $2,600 and some A/V equipment. Garcia claimed that Doody panicked, thinking one of the monks had recognized him as a brother of a temple-goer, then shot all of the victims in the head with the rifle, while Garcia shot four of them again in the torso with the shotgun. Garcia also said the crime had been planned in advance including leaving no witnesses.

== Legal proceedings ==
Both men were charged with the crime of armed robbery and first-degree murder. Garcia pleaded guilty in 1993 to avoid the death penalty and was sentenced to 271 years in prison. Doody was convicted in 1994 and sentenced to 281 years in prison. Garcia, along with his girlfriend Michelle Hoover, also pled guilty to the murder of Alice Cameron two months after the temple massacre.

Doody's attorneys later appealed, claiming Doody's father had not been present during the interrogation and that Doody's confession was not voluntary because authorities improperly administered the Miranda warning.

Doody's conviction was overturned in 2008 by the 9th Circuit Court of Appeals and again in 2011. Doody's second trial resulted in a mistrial in 2013.

The third trial concluded in January 2014, and found Doody guilty on all counts, including the nine murders. The jury based its findings on Garcia's testimony and circumstantial evidence. Doody was sentenced to 9 consecutive life terms. Johnathan Doody is imprisoned at the La Palma Correctional Facility. (Note: Doody was not eligible for the death penalty because he was 17 at the time of the murders. Execution of anyone for crimes committed while they were under the age of 18 was held to be unconstitutional in 2005 with the Supreme Court's decision in Roper v. Simmons. At the time of Doody and Garcia's original conviction, controlling case law was still Stanford v. Kentucky (1989), which allowed the execution of perpetrators over the age of 16 if they committed a capital offense.)

== Controversy over investigation ==
The investigation process into the murders is now viewed as botched.

=== Tucson Four ===
The initial arrests of the Tucson Four have generated controversy over how the investigation was conducted.

Initial suspect McGraw, while offering tantalizing details on the shooting for months, was later found to be unreliable, as he had a history of making outlandish claims while he was in prison in 1988. The investigators, despite little evidence that placed McGraw or the others anywhere near the crime scene at the time of the crime, deemed McGraw a reliable witness because they believed he was hospitalized as a psychiatric patient only out of suicidal guilt over the killings.

It was also discovered the investigation was beginning to focus on Doody and Garcia following the discovery of the murder weapon. But that part of the investigation stopped after McGraw's phone call led to the Tucson Four's arrest – the actual murder weapon sat behind a door in a detective's office for weeks before being tested.

Eventually, it was discovered the four men were coerced into confessing, with investigators extracting false confessions by exaggerating evidence, badgering them with leading questions, and threatening the death penalty. A homicide chief for Maricopa County Sheriff's Office at the time said the interrogators hammered on the suspects until their will was broken, and that "after a while, they were willing to say anything." The Sheriff's Office also put great credence in details the suspects confessed to, stating that they had information which only the perpetrators would know; it was later revealed that the interrogators poisoned this part of the so-called confessions by placing the suspects in a staged room, complete with crime scene photos and written reports, in the hopes of rattling the nerve of the suspects before the interrogations began – which also fed so-called unknowable details to the suspects.

The initial suspects, excluding McGraw, later filed lawsuits against Maricopa County, and in 1994, two received $1.1 million each (equivalent to $2.4 million in 2025), while a third received $240,000 (equivalent to $521,000 in 2025).

=== Doody ===
Interrogation techniques similar to those used on the Tucson Four were also used against Doody and Garcia and the 9th Circuit Court of Appeals ruled in 2011 that Doody's confession was illegally coerced. Gary L. Stuart, a lawyer with deep knowledge of the case, said Doody's confession never should have stood up in court at the 1994 trial.

Caratachea

The .22-caliber semi-automatic rifle used in the 1991 Waddell Buddhist temple killings was owned by Rolando Caratachea Jr. and found to be in his possession shortly after the killings. Moreover, several stolen items from the temple were later pawned by Caratachea. Caratachea had a criminal history of pulling armed robberies in the area under similar circumstances. The Framed podcast did an extensive examination of this case and concluded that strong evidence points to Caratachea and Garcia being the most likely perpetrators of the murders.

== Legacy ==
The investigation led to public outrage over then-Maricopa County Sheriff Tom Agnos. It eventually turned into a campaign issue when Joe Arpaio, who was a former DEA agent at the time, campaigned on a promise to restore credibility to the office. Agnos was eventually defeated by Arpaio in the November 1992 general election.

== See also ==
- Mano Laohavanich – Thailand politician with involvement in the case
