= History of San Diego =

The history of San Diego began in the present state of California, when Europeans first began inhabiting the San Diego Bay region. As the first area of California in which Europeans settled, San Diego has been described as "the birthplace of California". Explorer Juan Rodríguez Cabrillo was the first European to discover San Diego Bay in 1542, roughly 200 years before other Europeans settled the area. Native Americans such as the Kumeyaay people had been living in the area for as long as 12,000 years prior to any European presence. A fort and mission were established in 1769, which gradually expanded into a settlement under first Spanish and then Mexican rule.

San Diego officially became part of the U.S. in 1848, and the town was named the seat of San Diego County when California was granted statehood in 1850. It remained a very small town for several decades, but grew rapidly after 1880 due to development and the establishment of multiple military facilities. Growth was especially rapid during and immediately after World War II. Entrepreneurs and boosters laid the basis for an economy based today on the military, defense industries, biotech, tourism, international trade, and manufacturing. San Diego is now the eighth largest city in the country and forms the heart of the larger San Diego metropolitan area.

== Kumeyaay and Colonial Spanish period (prehistory–1821) ==
=== Pre-European contact ===
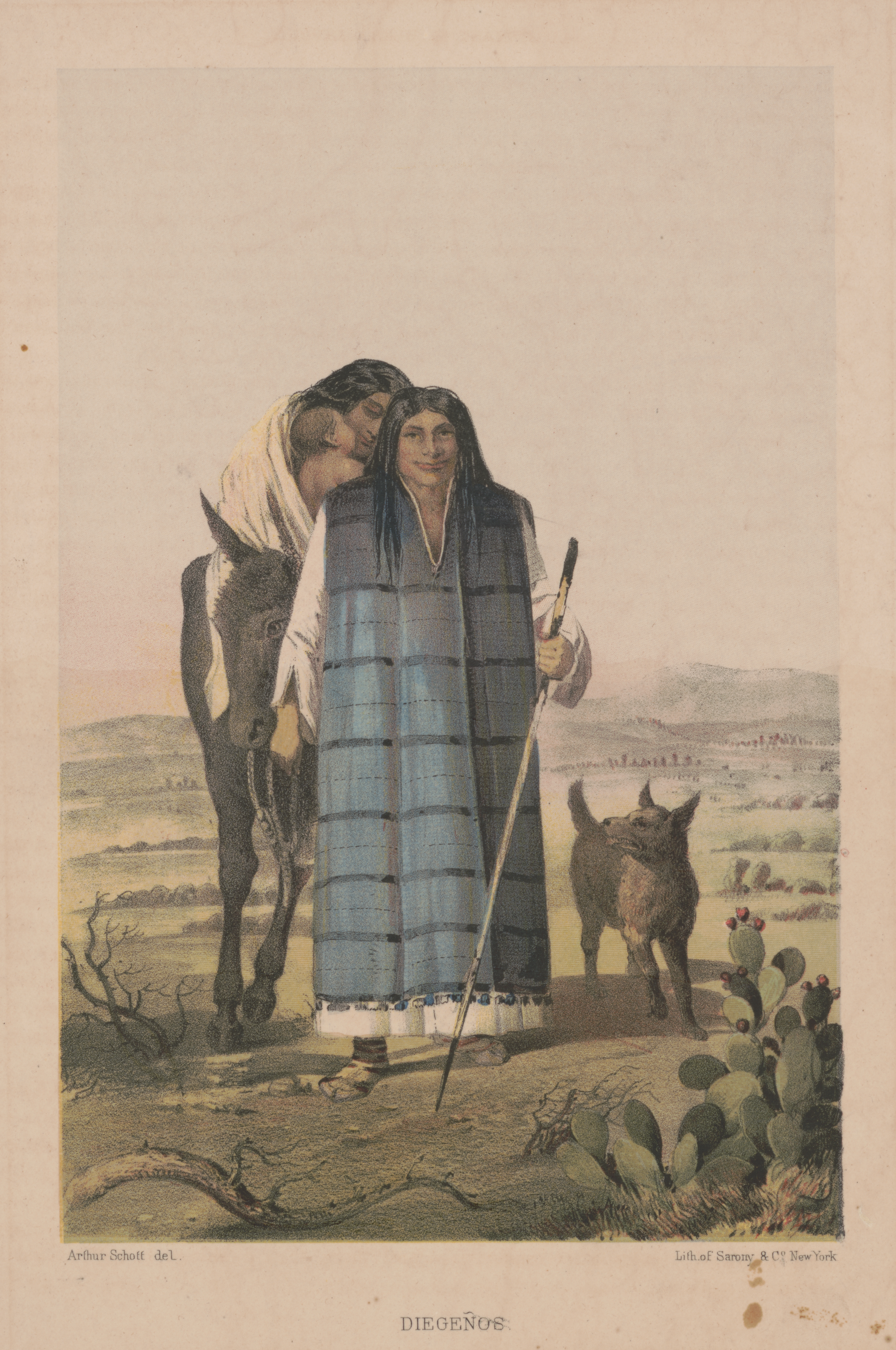
Kumeyaay natives indigenous to San Diego

==== San Dieguito complex (~12000 BCE - 8000 BCE) ====
The first inhabitants of the region are those of the San Dieguito complex. Hunter-gatherers who used scrappers, choppers, and knives. The people of the San Dieguito complex are considered Paleo-Indians.

==== La Jolla complex (~8000 BCE – 1000 CE) ====
The next inhabitants of the region were the people of the La Jolla complex, also known as the Shell Midden people, who lived in the region between 8000 BCE and 1000 CE.

==== Kumeyaay period (1000 CE – 1770s) ====
Yuman groups began migrating from the east and settling the area, who became known as the Kumeyaay. The Kumeyaay scattered villages across the region, including the village of Cosoy (Kosa'aay) which was the Kumeyaay village that the future settlement of San Diego would stem from in today's Old Town. Other villages include Nipaquay (Mission Valley), Choyas (Barrio Logan), Utay (Otay Mesa), Jamo (Pacific Beach), Onap (San Clemente Canyon), Ystagua (Sorrento Valley), and Melijo (Tijuana River Valley).

The Kumeyaay, in what is known as San Diego, spoke two different dialects of the Kumeyaay language. North of the San Diego River, the Kumeyaay spoke the Ipai dialect, which included the villages of Nipaquay, Jamo, Onap, Ystagua, and Ahmukatlatl. South of the San Diego river, the Kumeyaay spoke the Tiipai dialect, which was spoken in the villages of Kosa'aay, Choyas, Utay, and Melijo.

=== Spanish exploration and colonial period ===
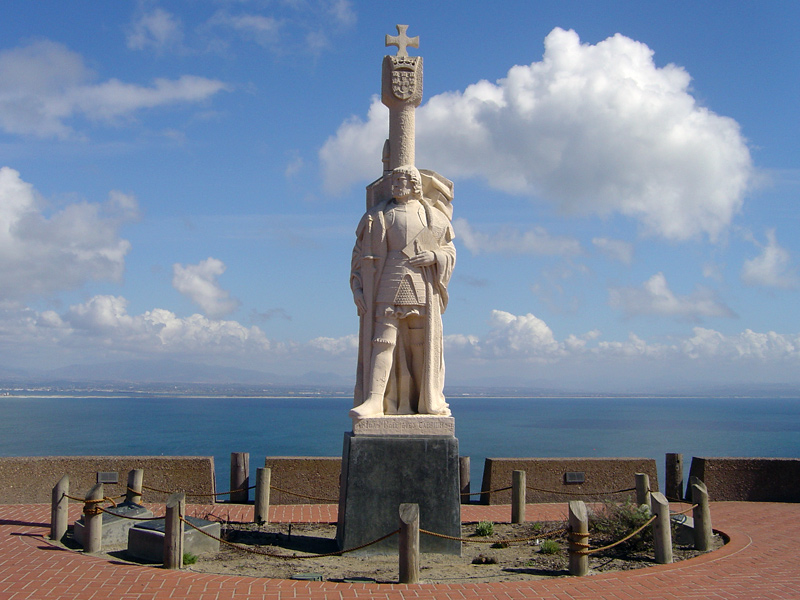
Cabrillo National Monument, San Diego

The first European to visit the region was Juan Rodríguez Cabrillo in 1542. His landing is re-enacted every year at the Cabrillo Festival sponsored by Cabrillo National Monument, but it did not lead to settlement.

The bay and the area of present-day San Diego were given their current name sixty years later by Sebastián Vizcaíno when he was mapping the coastline of Alta California for Spain in 1602. Vizcaino was a merchant who hoped to establish prosperous colonies. After holding the first Catholic mass conducted on California soil on the feast day of San Diego de Alcala, (also the patron saint of his flagship), he renamed the bay. He left after 10 days and was enthusiastic about its safe harbor, friendly natives, and promising potential as a successful colony. Despite his enthusiasm, the Spanish were unconvinced; it would be another 167 years before colonization began.

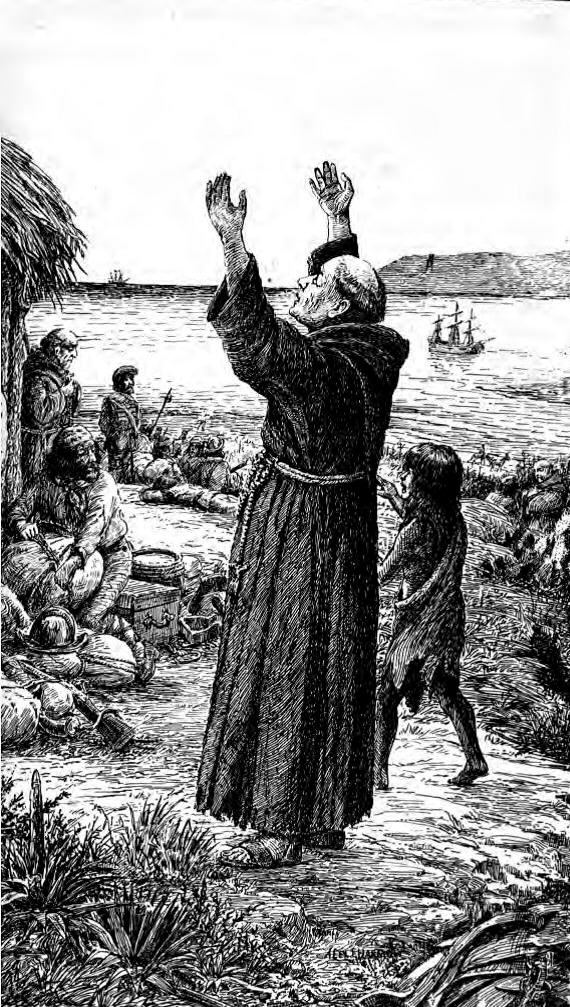
The Ship! The Ship! California is saved! Serra rejoices at the sight of the San Antonio entering San Diego Bay on March 19, 1770, with desperately needed food and supplies.

In 1769, Gaspar de Portolà and his expedition founded the Presidio of San Diego (military post) above the village of Cosoy, and on July 16, Franciscan friars Junípero Serra, Juan Viscaino and Fernando Parron raised and 'blessed a cross', establishing the first mission in upper Las Californias, Mission San Diego de Alcala. Colonists began arriving in 1774. In the following year the Kumeyaay indigenous people rebelled against the Spanish, which resulted in the deaths of a priest and two others, and burned the mission. Serra organized the rebuilding, and a fire-proof adobe and tile-roofed structure was completed in 1780. By 1797 the mission had become the largest in California, with a population of more than 1,400 converted Native American "Mission Indians" relocated to and associated with it. The tile-roofed adobe structure was destroyed by an 1803 earthquake but replaced by a third church in 1813.

In 1804, the Province of Las Californias split between the provinces of Alta California and Baja California, with San Diego being governed by Alta California from the regional capital in Monterey.

== Mexican period (1821–1848) ==
=== First Mexican Empire and First Mexican Republic (1821–1835): Pueblo de San Diego ===
In 1821, Mexico ousted the Spanish in the Mexican War of Independence and created the Province of Alta California. The San Diego Mission was secularized and shut down in 1834 and the land was sold off. 432 residents petitioned the governor to form a pueblo, and Juan María Osuna was elected the first alcalde ("municipal magistrate"), defeating Pío Pico in the vote. Beyond town Mexican land grants expanded the number of California ranchos that modestly added to the local economy.

The original town of San Diego, Pueblo de San Diego, was located at the foot of Presidio Hill, in the area which is now Old Town San Diego State Historic Park. The location was not ideal, being several miles away from navigable water. Imported goods and exports (primarily tallow and hides) had to be carried over the La Playa Trail to the anchorages in Point Loma. This arrangement was suitable only for a very small town. In 1830 the population was about 600. In 1834 the presidio was described as "in a most ruinous state, apart from one side, in which the commandant lived, with his family. There were only two guns, one of which was spiked, and the other had no carriage. Twelve half-clothed and half-starved-looking fellows composed the garrison, and they, it was said, had not a musket apiece." The settlement composed about forty brown huts and three or four larger, whitewashed ones belonging to the gentry.

=== Centralist Republic of Mexico (1835–1846): Decline of San Diego ===
In 1836, the Alta California and Baja California territories merged as the Department of Las Californias as part of the reforms made under Las Siete Leyes formalized under then President Antonio López de Santa Anna.

==== Kumeyaay raids on San Diego ====
In 1838 the town lost its pueblo status because of its dwindling population, estimated as 100 to 150 residents, and became a sub-prefecture of the Pueblo de Los Ángeles. This was due to souring relations between the Mexican regime and the Kumeyaay, which threatened the stability and the security of the town. Between 1836 and 1842, ranchos were abandoned as the Kumeyaay pillaged the countryside, with an initial attack on El Cajon in 1836 and Tijuana falling into Kumeyaay hands in 1839.

San Diego was first attacked circa 1836–1837 when a Mexican expedition to rescue two hostages failed and a large force of Kumeyaay launched an attack on the town, but were caught off guard when an armed merchant vessel, Alert, docked on the bay fired upon the Kumeyaay warriors forcing the Kumeyaay to retreat. Sir Edward Belcher of the British Navy on board HMS Sulphur on its way to fight in the First Opium War in Qing China, docked in San Diego Bay in October 1839, and noted that it would appear that San Diego would soon be taken by the "Indians" or another nation.

In June 1842, it culminated in a Kumeyaay raid on San Diego in an attempt to expel the Mexican settlers, after doing so to the Californios in the surrounding rancho countryside. While the pueblo was able to defend against the attack, the Kumeyaay managed to control much of the south, east, and most of the north of the settlement, with the town becoming dependent on sea access to maintain connections to the rest of Mexico. Joining with the existing Quechan resistance in the east, the Kumeyaay and the Quechan cut off Alta California from all land routes to the rest of the Mexican republic between the Colorado River and the Pacific Ocean (around the modern US-Mexican border) up until the Mexican-American War, further threatening Mexican control of the southern Alta California coast. For a period of time, the Mexicans became refugees on Point Loma as they waited for ships, hoping to evacuate from San Diego. San Diego was reinforced by forces under Manuel Micheltorena, consisting of soldiers and convicts.

=== Mexican–American War (1846-1848) ===
==== Captures of San Diego ====
During the Mexican–American War, the city of San Diego changed hands multiple times in 1846. Initially, American forces, including the USS Cyane and the California Battalion, captured the city in late July, raising the American flag over the pueblo. Many local Mexicans were divided as many of them welcomed the American occupation due to their disapproval of the Mexican administration of Alta California. José Antonio Estudillo retired to El Cajon, and declared himself neutral during the war.

The situation shifted after a revolt in Los Angeles on September 27, 1846. In early October, Serbulo Varela, with a contingent of fifty men (originally led by Francisco Rico (who was recalled back to Los Angeles)), approached San Diego to reclaim it. The small American garrison, under Captains Ezekiel Merritt and John Bidwell, evacuated the town, fearing they would be overrun. The Americans and their allies boarded the whaling ship Stonington. Some local residents declared neutrality. The Californios regained control without conflict.

On October 24, 1846, American forces returned to recapture San Diego. An American soldier spiked the Mexican cannons on Presidio Hill, allowing American volunteers to retake the city after a brief skirmish. The Mexican flag was lowered, but María Antonia Machado famously prevented it from being desecrated. American forces faced a siege beginning October 26, when Captain Leonardo Cota and Ramón Carrillo arrived with 100 men. The Americans, reinforced by Commodore Stockton's troops and the USS Congress, retook San Diego in Early November. The Stonington then departed to Ensenada dropping off a force led by Captain Samuel Gibson, who returned overland with supplies.

The Californios, led by figures such as José Antonio Carrillo, harassed the American positions, even attempting to starve them out by controlling local resources and blocking supply routes. Fighting occurred in late November driving California forces off of Presidio hill, renaming the presidio Fort Stockton. According to Californio accounts, the situation in San Diego was tense. The besieged Americans constructed defenses and enduring nightly sniper fire. Despite efforts to secure provisions, including a failed attempt to capture cattle, the Americans remained largely trapped. The siege continued until early December, when news of General Stephen Kearney’s approaching dragoons led to a coordinated effort to relieve the town.

==== Battle of San Pasqual ====
The Americans fought the Californio in the Battle of San Pasqual in December, with both sides claiming victory. Following events near San Gabriel in early January 1847, peace returned to California.

== An American town (1848–1900) ==
Alta California became part of the United States in 1848 following the U.S. victory in the Mexican–American War and the Treaty of Guadalupe Hidalgo, with the Mexico–United States border established just south of the town. The resident "Californios" became American citizens with full voting rights. California was admitted to the Union as a state in 1850. San Diego, still little more than a village, was incorporated on March 27 as a city and was named the county seat of the newly established San Diego County. The United States Census reported the population of the town as 650 in 1850 and 731 in 1860.

San Diego promptly got into financial trouble by overspending on a poorly designed jail. In 1852, the state repealed the city charter, in effect declaring the city bankrupt, and installed a state-controlled three-member board of trustees to manage San Diego. The trustees stayed in control until 1887, when a mayor–council form of government was installed under a new city charter.

=== San Diego tax rebellion of 1851 ===
San Diego was still far from secure after the Mexican–American war, as the Kumeyaay still controlled the inland regions near the town. In 1851, San Diego County imposed property taxes on Native American tribes in the county and threatened to confiscate land and property should they fail to pay the $600 tax. This led to a revolt by Cupeño and Kumeyaay, who were asked to pay in a currency they had never encountered. The revolt was led by Cupeño leader Antonio Garra, who attacked Warner's Ranch and opened up the western theater of the Yuma War to secure indigenous control of the Laguna Mountains and Imperial Valley. This attack shocked the residents of San Diego, as many residents had begun to prepare for another attack by the Kumeyaay. While the conflict ended in America's favor, San Diego would remain of military interest as the US sought to secure its position in the Pacific and the new San Antonio–San Diego Mail Line route which operated between 1857 and 1861.

=== Davis era – founder of New Town San Diego ===
In 1850, with California being admitted into the Union, William Heath Davis, an American-Hawaiian pioneer, envisioned a thriving city on the bay and spent $60,000 to develop a 160 acre subdivision which included the city's streets, Pantoja Park, a warehouse, a wharf at the foot of today's Market Street, and ten New England saltbox houses shipped in from Maine. It was completed by August 1851, but was seldom used. In 1853, the steamer Los Angeles collided with the wharf. The damage was never repaired. Unused and poorly built, the damage was not worth fixing. Davis tried unsuccessfully to sell it. Finally, in 1862, the Army destroyed it, using timbers for firewood.

The failure of the wharf was only one indication of depressed times. Houses were dismantled and shipped to more promising settlements. By 1860, many of the enterprises that had been established during the early 1850s had closed. The few businesses that survived suffered from water shortages, high costs of shipping, and a declining population. Davis, however, kept trying. He continued to speculate in land in the business district, and constructed hotels and stores. Unfortunately, in 1851, a year after he created New Town, fire destroyed his San Francisco warehouse, costing him a fortune and he soon ran out of money. Leadership in boosterism passed to Alonzo Horton.

In 1851, the first newspaper of San Diego, the San Diego Herald, was published by John Judson Ames. He continued to publish the Herald until April 1860.

=== Horton era – successor of New Town San Diego ===
The town seemed rundown in 1867 when Horton arrived, but he could only see glittering opportunity: "I have been nearly all over the world and it seemed to me to be the best spot for building a city I ever saw." He was convinced that the town needed a location nearer the water to improve trade. Within a month of his arrival, he had purchased more than 900 acres of today's downtown for a total of $265, an average of 27.5 cents an acre. He began promoting San Diego by enticing entrepreneurs and residents. He built a wharf and began to promote development there. The area was referred to as New Town or the Horton Addition. Despite opposition from the residents of the original settlement, which became known as "Old Town", businesses and residents flocked to New Town, and San Diego experienced the first of its many real estate booms. In 1871, government records were moved to a new county courthouse in New Town, and by the 1880s New Town (or downtown) had totally eclipsed Old Town as the heart of the growing city. Horton also called for city land set aside for a new central park, which eventually came to fruition as Balboa Park.

In 1878, San Diego was predicted to become a rival of San Francisco's trading ports. To prevent that, the manager of Central Pacific Railroad Charles Crocker, decided not to build an extension to San Diego, fearing that it would take too much trade from San Francisco. In 1885, a transcontinental railroad route came to San Diego, and the population boomed, reaching 16,159 by 1890. In 1906 the San Diego and Arizona Railway of John D. Spreckels was built to provide San Diego with a direct transcontinental rail link to the east by connecting with the Southern Pacific Railroad lines in El Centro, California. It became the San Diego and Arizona Eastern Railway. In 1933 the Spreckels heirs sold it to the Southern Pacific Railroad.

Historical population
Census	Pop.	Note	%±
1850	500		—
1860	731		46.2%
1870	2,300		214.6%
1880	2,637		14.7%
1890	16,159		512.8%
1900	17,700		9.5%
1910	39,578		123.6%
1920	74,361		87.9%
1930	147,995		99.0%
1940	203,341		37.4%
1950	333,865		64.2%
1960	573,224		71.7%
1970	696,769		21.6%
1980	875,538		25.7%
1990	1,110,549		26.8%
2000	1,223,400		10.2%
2010	1,307,402		6.9%

== Emergence of a regional city (1900–1941) ==
The city grew in bursts, especially in the 1880s and again from 1900 to 1930, when it reached 148,000.

=== The Gibraltar of the Pacific ===
In the 1890–1914 period the nation became greatly interested in Pacific naval affairs, as seen in the Spanish–American War of 1898; the U.S. acquisition of Guam, the Philippines, and Hawaii; and the opening of the Panama Canal in 1914. San Diego was in a strategic location and sought to become "the Gibraltar of the Pacific". Civic leaders such as real-estate developer D. C. Collier and other leaders of the Chamber of Commerce, assisted by Congressman William Kettner actively lobbied the Navy and the federal government to make San Diego a major location for naval, marine, and air bases. During World War I the U.S. greatly expanded the Navy, and the city was eager to help. By the time the Marine Base and Naval Training Center opened in the early 1920s, the Navy had built seven bases in San Diego at a cost of $20 million, with another $17 million in the pipeline. The city's 'culture of accommodation' determined the way the city would grow for the next several decades, and created a military-urban complex rather than a tourist and health resort. With the reduction in naval spending after 1990, the Chamber turned its focus to tourism and conventions.

San Diego had the great harbor and the weather; it seemed poised to become a world-class metropolis. But it was overshadowed by both San Francisco and Los Angeles. Businessman John D. Spreckels expressed the enthusiasm of San Diego's boosters in 1923, as well as the disappointment that it had not fully developed.:

Why did I come to San Diego? Why did any of you come? We came because we thought we saw an unusual opportunity here. We believed that everything pointed to this as the logical site for a great city and seaport. In short, we had faith in San Diego's future. We gave of our time and our strength and our means...to help develop our city, and naturally, our own fortunes. ... What is the matter with San Diego? Why is it not the metropolis and seaport that its geographical and other unique advantages entitle it to be? Why does San Diego always just miss the train, somehow?

==== Military installations ====
The southern portion of the Point Loma peninsula was set aside for military purposes as early as 1852. Over the next several decades the Army set up a series of coastal artillery batteries and named the area Fort Rosecrans. After World War II the former site of Fort Rosecrans in Point Loma was used for multiple Navy commands, including a submarine base and a Naval Electronics Laboratory; they were eventually consolidated into Naval Base Point Loma. Other portions of Fort Rosecrans became Fort Rosecrans National Cemetery and Cabrillo National Monument.

Significant U.S. Navy presence began in 1901, with the establishment of the Navy Coaling Station in Point Loma, and expanded greatly during the 1920s. Camp Kearny was established in 1917, closed in 1920, and later reopened; since 1996 it has been the site of Marine Corps Air Station Miramar. In the interim it was in whole or part Camp Elliot (during World War II), the Sycamore Canyon Test Facility, and Naval Air Station Miramar (with its "Top Gun" fighter school). The Marine base Camp Matthews, which was joined by Camp Callan from 1941 to 1945, occupied a mesa near La Jolla from 1917 until 1964; the site is now the campus of University of California, San Diego. Naval Base San Diego was established in 1922, as was the San Diego Naval Hospital. Marine Corps Recruit Depot San Diego was commissioned in 1921 and the San Diego Naval Training Center in 1923; the Naval Training Center was closed in 1997.

In 1942 the Marine Corps Base Camp Pendleton was set up 45 miles north of the city on 250,000 acres. It remains one of the main Marine Corps training facilities. It became the home of the 1st Marine Division in 1946 and later the I Marine Expeditionary Force as well as several training commands. In 1975 the Marine Corps opened the Camp Pendleton Refugee Camp to care for some of the hundreds of thousands of South Vietnamese and Cambodians refugees who fled after the Vietnam War was lost.

In the early 1990s, twenty percent of the San Diego region's economy was dependent on defense spending.

=== Progressive reform ===
San Diego gave strong support to the Progressive Movement that swept California in the early 20th century in order to purify the state from oppressive bossism and corporate rule. Progressive Republicans resented the political power of the Southern Pacific Railroad and the role of "Boss" Charles Hardy. Reformers organized and fought back beginning with the 1905 municipal election. In 1906, they formed the Roosevelt Republican Club, and in 1907 reformers backed a Nonpartisan League. Led by Edgar Luce, George Marston and Ed Fletcher, the Roosevelt Republican Club became the Lincoln-Roosevelt Republican League. The mayoralty election of 1909 marked a sweeping victory for the League, as did the 1910 election of Hiram Johnson as governor.

In 1912, City Council restrictions on soapbox oratories led to the San Diego free speech fight, a confrontation between the Industrial Workers of the World on the one side and law enforcement, business interests and vigilantes on the other.

Marston was defeated for mayor in 1913 (against Charles F. O'Neall) and again in 1917 (against Louis J. Wilde). The 1917 race in particular was a classic growth-vs.-beautification debate. Marston argued for better city planning with more open space and grand boulevards; Wilde argued for more business development. Wilde called his opponent "Geranium George", painting Marston as unfriendly to business. Wilde's campaign slogan was "More Smokestacks", and during the campaign he drew a great smokestack belching smoke on a truck through the city streets. The phrase "smokestacks vs. geraniums" is still used in San Diego to characterize this type of debate between environmentalists and growth advocates.

=== World's fairs ===
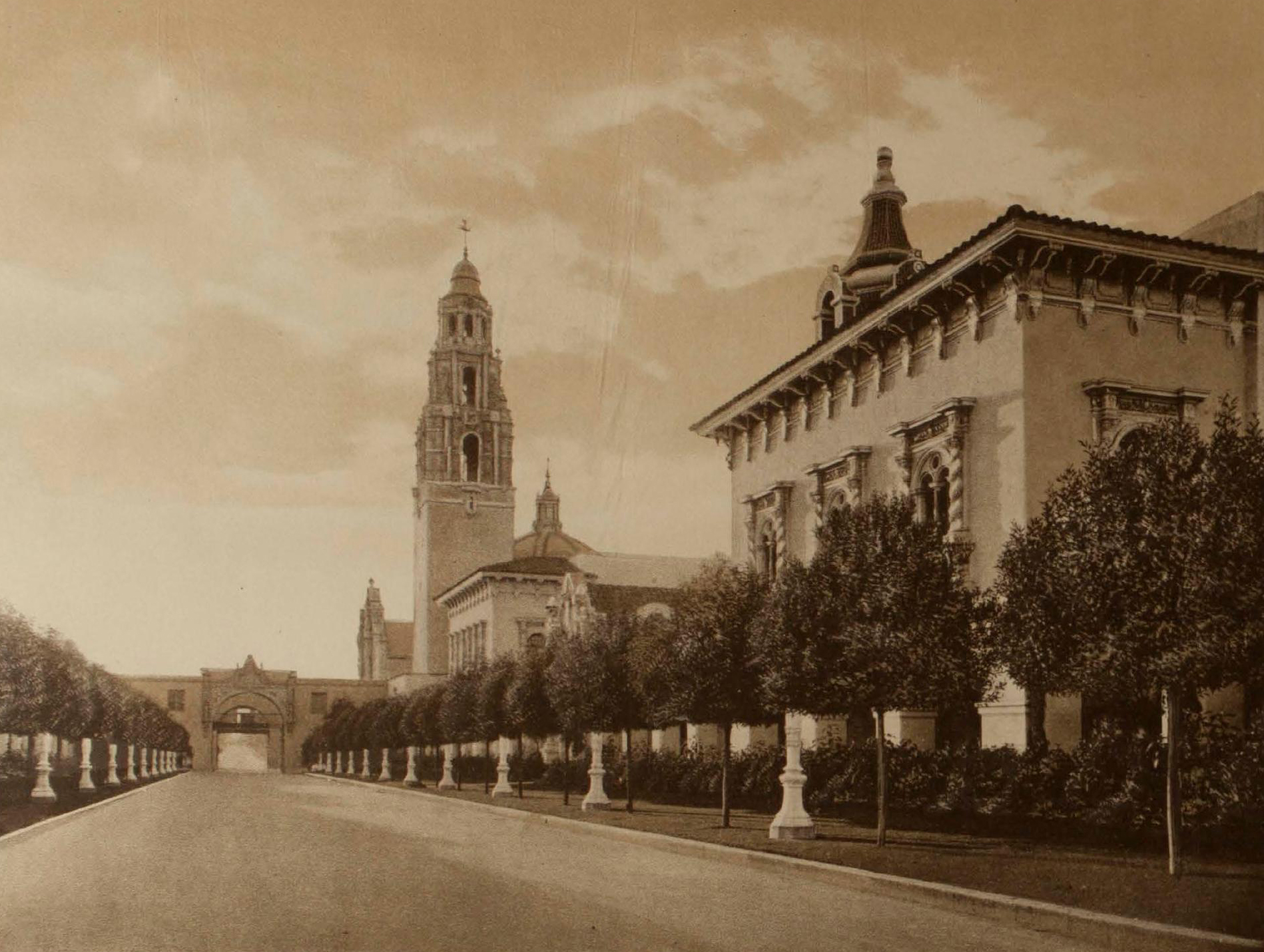
Panama-California Exposition of 1915–1916

San Diego hosted two World's fairs, the Panama-California Exposition in 1915–1916, and the California Pacific International Exposition in 1935–1936. The expositions left a lasting legacy in the form of Balboa Park and the San Diego Zoo, and by popularizing Mission Revival Style and Spanish Colonial Revival Style architecture locally and in Southern California as a regional aesthetic and nationwide design influence. The Spanish Colonial Revival architecture used in the design of the 1915 Fair was designed by architect Bertram Goodhue of the firm Cram, Goodhue and Ferguson in Boston, Massachusetts. He was inspired by his studies of the architecture of Mexico. The Federal Works Progress Administration (WPA) helped fund the 1935 fair, which was designed by architect Richard S. Requa.

=== Tuna industry ===
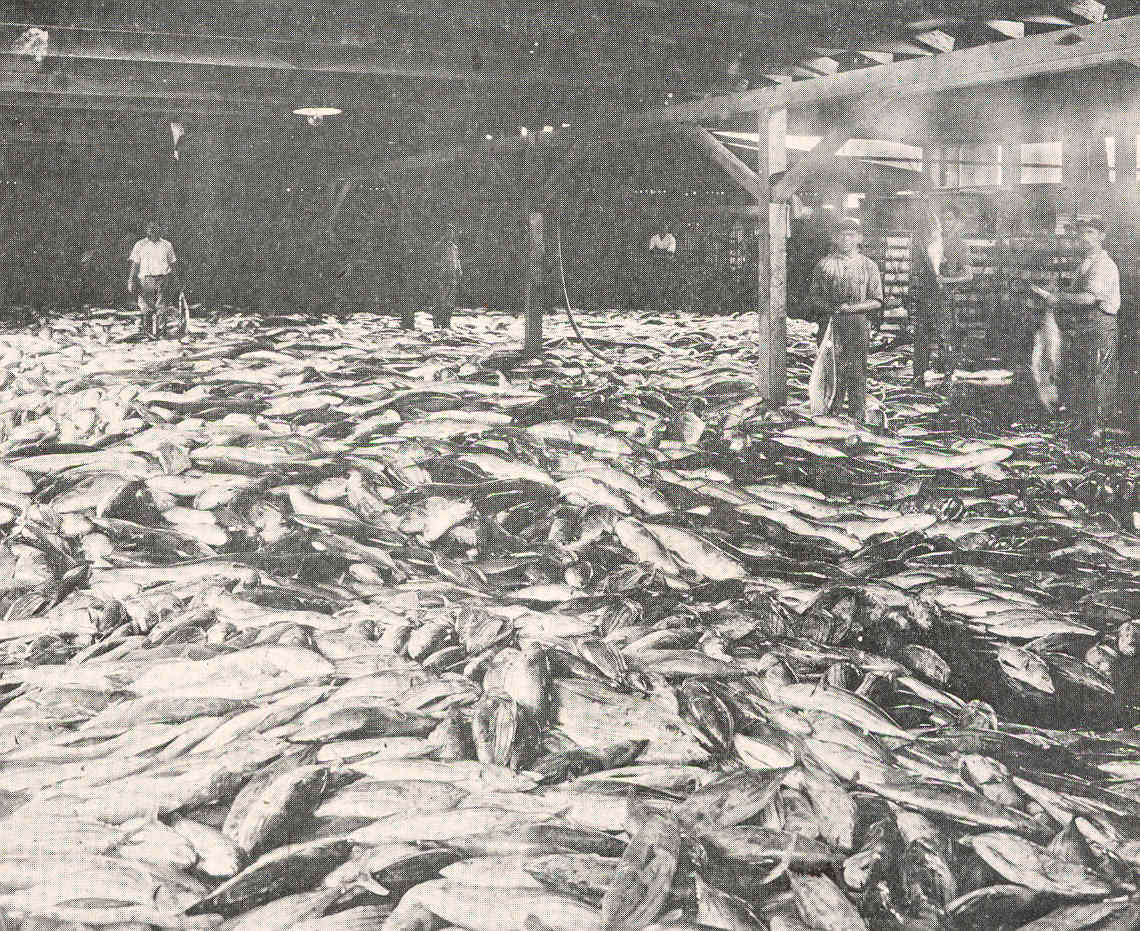
Cannery of the International Packing Corporation in 1919

From the 1910s through the 1970s, the American tuna fishing fleet and tuna canning industry were based in San Diego, acclaimed by boosters as the "tuna capital of the world". San Diego's first large tuna cannery, the Pacific Tuna Canning Company, was founded in 1911. Others such as Van Camp Seafood, Bumble Bee and StarKist followed. A large fishing fleet supported the canneries, mostly staffed by immigrant fishermen. Portuguese began arriving to San Diego in the 1860s, and began immigrating in large numbers in the early 20th century, becoming the largest population of foreign-born fishermen in San Diego. Japanese owners and fishermen were an important part of the industry, making up half of the workforce; at the height of their involvement they caught more than eighty percent of the albacore catch. Later the workforce was dominated by immigrants from the Portuguese Azores and Italy.

By 1920, there were about 700 boats in Southern California engaged in the tuna industry, and ten canneries in San Diego. In 1922, Van Camp Seafood Company consolidated their canning facilities to San Diego, closing a facility in San Pedro. By the mid-1930s housewives in the Great Depression appreciated the cheap, easy-to-serve food. By 1939 the fleet's tuna catch exceeded 100 million pounds. By the 1930s, legislation was passed that attempted to limit Japanese fishermen, and due to World War II the boats owned by Japanese Americans were confiscated by the U.S. Navy.

During World War II when fishing was not possible, 53 tuna boats and about 600 crew members served the U.S. Navy as the "yippie fleet" (so called because of service numbers beginning with YP, for Yard Patrol), also called the "pork chop express", delivering food, fuel and supplies to military installations all over the Pacific. Twenty-one of the vessels were lost and dozens of crew members were killed on these hazardous missions. Yippie ships won more than a dozen battle stars and several Presidential Unit Citations.

In the 1950s tuna fishing and canning was the third largest industry in San Diego, after the Navy and aviation. In 1951 there were over eight hundred fishing boats and almost three thousand fisherman homeported in San Diego. The San Diego tuna fleet reached a peak of 160 vessels, and in 1962 employed around forty thousand San Diegans. Banker C. Arnholt Smith, a top civic leader, was a major investor. With Japan offering cheaper tuna after 1950, Smith worked to break the union using new technology and Peruvian canneries.

The industry suffered due to rising costs and foreign competition. In 1980, Mexico seized American tuna ships, and confiscated those ships fishing equipment (particularly their fishing nets), after declaring an exclusive economic zone; this led to an embargo which heavily impacted the tuna fleet, and also led to increased importation of frozen tuna. Severely impacting the American tuna fleet, many ships moved to Mexico, or were sold to operators in other countries. The last cannery closed in 1984, with a loss of thousands of jobs.

The legacy of the tuna fleet is still felt in Little Italy, where most of the Italian fishermen settled, and in the Point Loma neighborhood of Roseville, still sometimes referred to as "Tunaville", where many Portuguese fishermen and boat owners settled. There is a sculpture dedicated to the cannery workers in Barrio Logan and a "Tunaman's Memorial" statue representing the fishermen on Shelter Island. The tuna industry is also commemorated by Tuna Harbor Park on San Diego Bay. The Bumble Bee Foods company is still headquartered in San Diego.

=== Philanthropy ===
Philanthropy was an important part of San Diego's expansion. For example, wealthy heiress Ellen Browning Scripps underwrote many public facilities in La Jolla, was a key supporter of the fledgling San Diego Zoo, and together with her brother E. W. Scripps established the Scripps Institution of Oceanography. Another notable philanthropist of this era was George Marston, businessman and owner of Marston's Department Store. Wanting to see Balboa Park become a grand city park like those in other cities, he hired architect John Nolen on two occasions, 1908 and 1926, to develop a master plan for the park. In 1907 he bought Presidio Hill, site of the original Presidio of San Diego, which had fallen into ruins. Recognizing its importance as the site of the first European settlement in California, he developed it into a park (planned by Nolen) with his own funds, and built the Serra Museum (designed by architect William Templeton Johnson). In 1929 he donated the park to the city, which still owns and operates it; it is now listed on the National Register of Historic Places.

=== Great Depression ===
San Diego met the challenge of the Great Depression better than most parts of the country. The population of San Diego County grew 38%, from 210,000 to 290,000, from 1930 to 1940, while the city itself went from 148,000 to 203,000—a much better rate than the state as a whole. There was money enough to build a new municipal golf course and tennis courts, to improve the water system, and open a new Spanish-style campus for San Diego State College (now San Diego State University). The New Deal used PWA relief money to expand the fleet, bringing more money into the city. In 1935 the entire Pacific Fleet assembled with 48 warships, 400 naval aircraft, 55,000 sailors and 3000 officers to demonstrate the importance of sea power to the city, and to exhibit to Japan and the rest of the world America's interest in the Pacific. The expansion of naval and army aviation led Consolidated Aircraft Corporation of Buffalo New York to bring all its 800 employees to San Diego, opening a major assembly plant, Convair, which built Navy flying boats. Ryan Aeronautical Company, which built the Spirit of St. Louis for the famous 1927 flight of Charles Lindbergh, also flourished. The 7.2 million visitors to the California-Pacific International Exposition in 1935–36 were impressed with the city's prosperity, as well as the 400 exhibits from 23 nations.

== War and postwar period (1941–present) ==
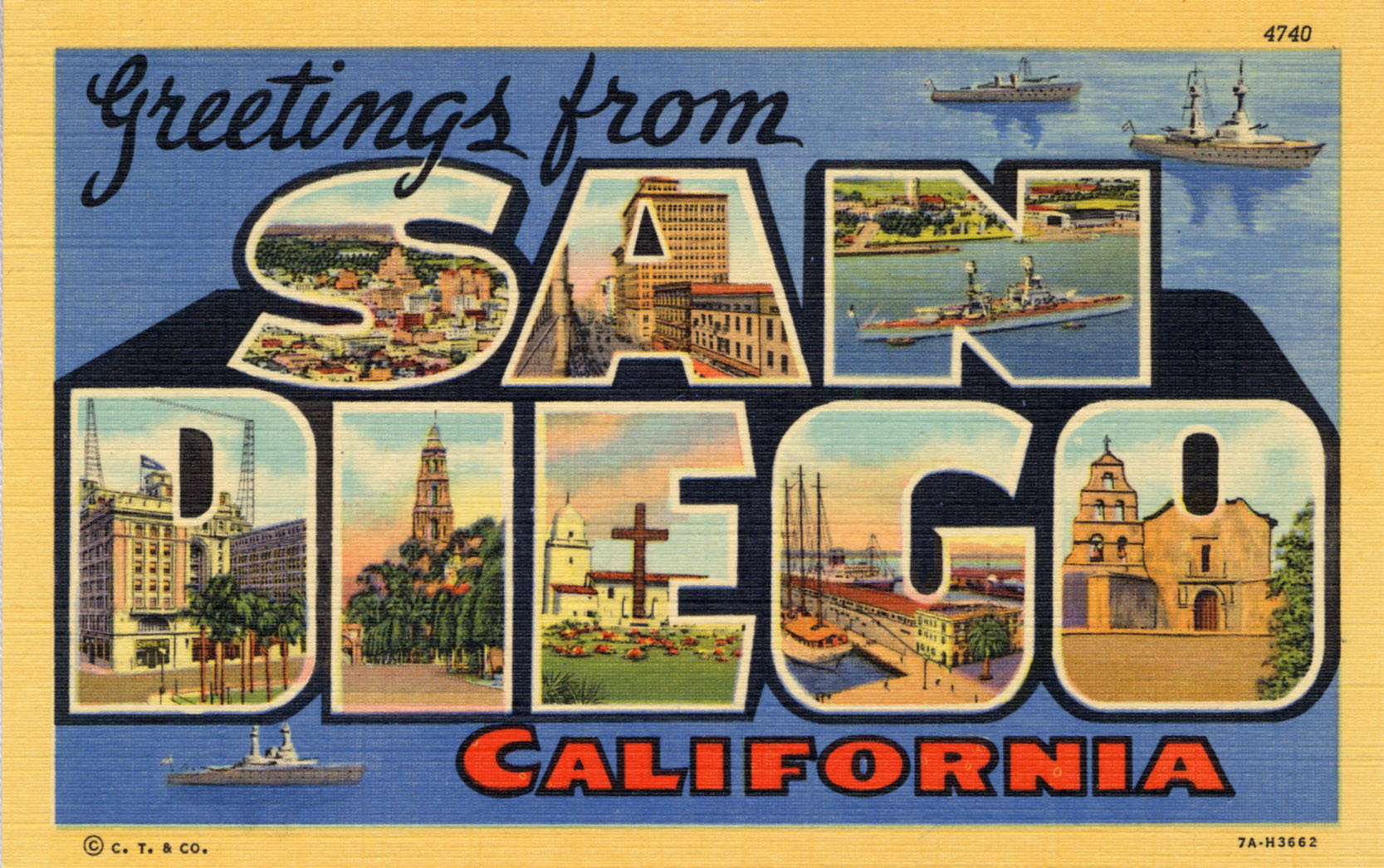
Greetings from San Diego c. 1940

Since World War I, the military has played a leading role in the local economy. World War II brought prosperity and gave millions of soldiers, sailors and airmen en route to the Pacific a view of the opportunities in California. The aircraft factories grew from small handcraft shops to gigantic factories. The city's population soared from 200,000 to 340,000, as the Navy and Marines opened training facilities and the aircraft factories doubled their employment rosters every few months. With 40,000 to 50,000 sailors off duty every weekend, the downtown entertainment districts soon became saturated. The red-light district was officially shut down, but opportunities were easily available a few miles south in Tijuana, Mexico. Workers poured in from the towns and from across the country, creating a severe housing shortage. Public transportation (trolleys and buses) could barely keep up with the demand, and automobiles were rationed to only 3 gallons a week. Many wives who relocated while their husbands were training stayed in the city when their men shipped out and took high-paying jobs in the defense industries. The dramatic increase in the need for fresh water led the Navy in 1944 to build the San Diego Aqueduct to import water from the Colorado River; the city financed the second pipeline in 1952. By 1990, San Diego was the sixth largest city in the United States.

=== Industrial change ===
After World War I, and through World War II, San Diego County was home to multiple parachute manufacturers. During World War II one of those manufactures, Pacific Parachute Company, was owned by two African Americans: Eddie Rochester Anderson of the Jack Benny Show, who funded the project, and Howard "Skippy" Smith. They hired a diverse workforce, and was awarded in 1943 the National Negro Business League's Spaulding Award. After the end of war, with the drop in demand, these parachute manufacturers closed down in San Diego. However, the building still stands today at 627 Eighth Avenue.

Convair was the largest employer in San Diego, with 32,000 well-paid workers in the mid-1950s. In 1954 it was bought out and became the Convair Division of General Dynamics, a large aerospace conglomerate based in Texas. Convair had been highly successful in the 1950s with the B-36, a very long-range bomber that became the workhorse of the Strategic Air Command. General Dynamics refocused Convair on commercial aviation as the Convair 240, a two-engine passenger plane, proved highly successful in the world market. Convair decided to move up to the very rapidly growing world market for medium-range jet passenger planes with the Convair 880. It was designed to rival Boeing's proposed 707, and Douglas's proposed DC-8. Financial and technical delays left Convair lagging far behind. After heavy losses, General Dynamics moved all the airplane elements to Texas, and left the San Diego factory with small-scale space and missile projects. Convair's employment fell to 3300 in San Diego.

As the Cold War ended, the military shrunk and so did defense spending. San Diego has since become a center of the emerging biotech industry and is home to telecommunications giant Qualcomm. Starting in the 1990s the city and county developed a nationally known craft beer industry; the area is sometimes referred to as "America's Craft Beer capital". As of the end of 2012 there were 60 microbreweries and brewpubs in the county; by 2021, that number increased to 158.

==== Tourism industry ====
Not long after the Panama-California Exposition in Balboa Park, John D. Spreckels developed and opened Belmont Park amusement park (originally the Mission Beach Amusement Center) on July 4,1925. San Diego's tourism offerings beyond beaches and Balboa Park expanded in the postwar decades with major animal theme parks. The SeaWorld chain opened Sea World San Diego in 1964. The San Diego zoo opened the San Diego Zoo Safari Park (originally the San Diego Wild Animal Park) in 1972.

Historical buildings reflecting the city's Spanish and Mexican heritage, such as Old Town San Diego State Historic Park and Mission San Diego de Alcalá were designated as historical landmarks by local and federal agencies in the 1970s. San Diego also received the decommissioned USS Midway, as a museum ship which opened as the USS Midway Museum in 2004.

The region also welcomed Legoland California in Carlsbad in 1999, the first Legoland park outside of Europe. Cedar Fair opened a Knott's Soak City park in Chula Vista in 1997,which was sold to SeaWorld Parks & Entertainment and rebranded as Aquatica San Diego in 2013. The water park was rebranded for a third time as Sesame Place in 2022, themed on the Sesame Street children's television series.

=== Universities ===
After acquiring the Scripps Institution of Oceanography in 1912, the University of California (UC) built up a presence, with an emphasis on scientific research and cultural opportunities. For years UC operated an extension program in San Diego. In 1960, following wartime and postwar increases in population and economic growth in San Diego, UC broke ground for a new campus there, and classes at UCSD began in 1964. Under Richard C. Atkinson, chancellor from 1980 to 1995, UCSD strengthened its ties with the city of San Diego by encouraging technology transfer with developing companies, transforming San Diego into a world leader in technology-based industries. Private giving rose from $15 million to nearly $50 million annually, faculty expanded by nearly 50%, and enrollment doubled to about 18,000 students during his chancellorship.

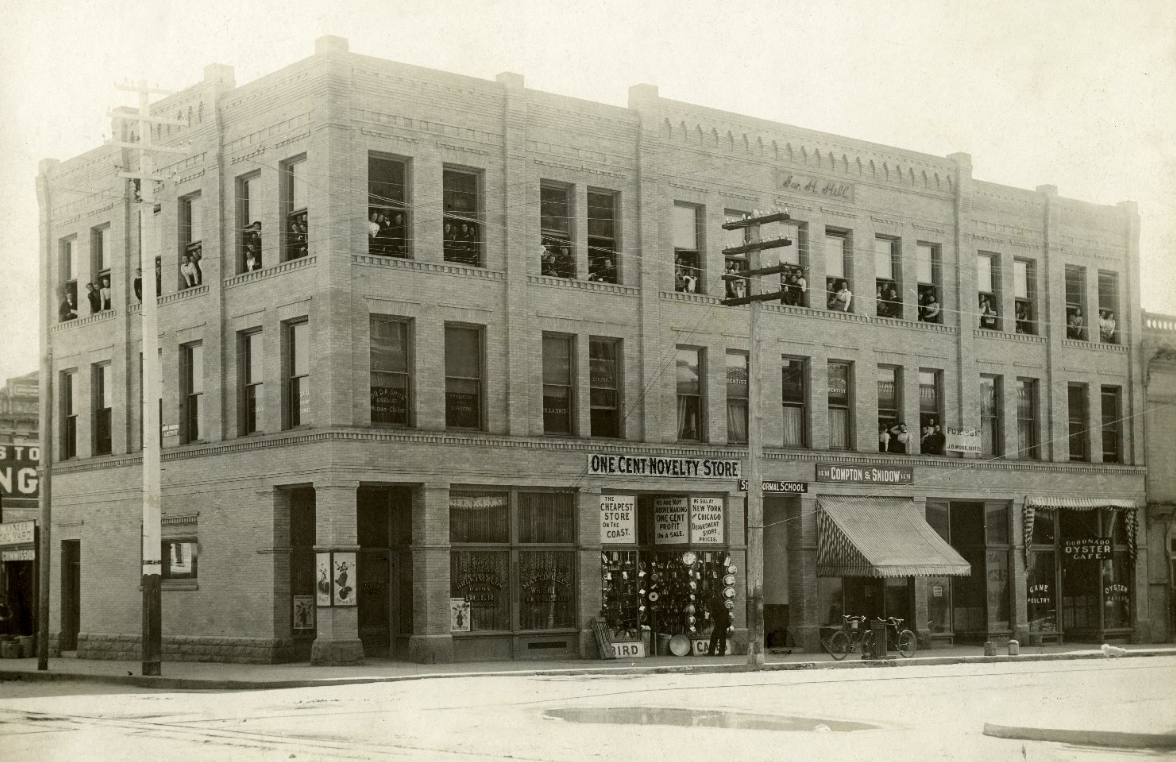
The upper floor of the Hill building, located at 6th Avenue and F Street, was the first location of the San Diego Normal School. Students and staff can be seen in the windows here in 1898. The school would later expand and change names several times before settling on the current name, San Diego State University.

San Diego State University (SDSU) is the largest and oldest higher education facility in San Diego County. It was founded in 1897 as San Diego Normal School, a state school for the preparation of teachers, located on Park Avenue in University Heights. In 1931 it moved to a larger location on Aztec Mesa, overlooking Mission Valley, at what was then the eastern edge of San Diego. In 1935 it expanded its offerings beyond teacher education and became San Diego State College. In 1970 it became San Diego State University, part of the California State University system. SDSU has grown to a student body of more than 30,000 and an alumni base of more than 260,000.

The University of San Diego, a private Catholic school, began as the San Diego College for Women in 1952, sponsored by the Society of the Sacred Heart of Jesus. In 1957 the campus on a hilltop site called Alcala Park also became home to the Immaculate Heart Major Seminary and St. Francis Minor Seminary. The landmark Immaculata Chapel also opened that year. In 1972 the San Diego College for Women merged with the nearby San Diego College for Men and the School of Law to become the University of San Diego.

Point Loma Nazarene University, formerly Pasadena College, relocated to San Diego's Point Loma neighborhood in 1973 after purchasing the campus of the former California Western University. PLNU is a private Protestant university known for its academics, scenic coastal campus and annual Writer's Symposium by the Sea conference which has included the likes of Cornel West, Alice Walker, Ray Bradbury and Kareem Abdul-Jabbar. Its campus features the only Greek theater on the West Coast and its baseball field has been named 'America's Most Scenic Ballpark' by MLB.

=== Downtown ===
In the 1930s and early 1940s, the area around Fifth and Island had a concentration of Asian American businesses, specifically of the Chinese, Japanese, and Filipino American communities. These businesses, particularly the Chinese American businesses, had a place in downtown as early as the 1860s. In the late 20th century, the area was designated the Asian Pacific Thematic Historic District.

During World War II, the internment of Japanese Americans impacted the make up of downtown San Diego, as their businesses had to close. The efforts to remove Japanese Americans were supported by local elected officials. In early April 1942, the Japanese Americans who lived in San Diego, were transported by train to Santa Anita Park. Personal belongings were taken to a Buddhist temple for storage during the internment, but were lost following a fire in 1943.

Up through the 1950s the downtown area was a focus of civic and cultural life, featuring elegant hotels like the U.S. Grant and the El Cortez, as well as Marston's, an upscale department store. During the 1970s that focus shifted to Mission Valley with its modern shopping centers. The hotels fell into disrepair, Marston's closed, and the downtown area developed a seedy reputation. The transformation of the downtown areas from a zone of poverty and poor housing to a major tourist attraction with large numbers of jobs began in 1968 with the creation of the Centre City Development Corporation. Its urban renewal project focused on the Gaslamp Quarter beginning in 1968, with the goal of making the area a national historic district and bringing upper- and middle-class tourists and suburban residents to downtown San Diego. Since the 1980s the city has seen the opening of the former Horton Plaza shopping center, the revival of the Gaslamp Quarter, and the construction of the San Diego Convention Center.

=== Gentrification ===
A recent boom on the construction of condos and skyscrapers (especially focusing on mixed-use facilities), a gentrification trend especially in Little Italy, and the inauguration of Petco Park in the once blighted East Village highlight the continuing development of downtown. Center city population is expected to rise to 77,000 residents by 2030; 30,000 people currently reside in downtown San Diego.

A successful renewal by 'gentrification' is the Hillcrest neighborhood, known for its historic architecture, tolerance, diversity, and locally owned businesses, including restaurants, cafés, bars, clubs, trendy thrift-stores, and other independent specialty stores. Hillcrest has a high population density, compared to many other neighborhoods in San Diego, and it has a large and active lesbian, gay, bisexual and transgender (LGBT) community.

This renewal extended to the surrounding neighborhoods in the 1990s, especially in older urban neighborhoods immediately north of Balboa Park such as North Park and City Heights.

=== Annexations and suburban expansion ===
Prior to WWII, San Diego annexed East San Diego in 1923. After the war, development sprawled into University City, Clairemont Mesa, Linda Vista, and Mira Mesa, and the city of San Diego began rapidly expanding its city limits.

In 1957, San Diego annexed San Ysidro as well as parts of Otay Mesa, the rest of Otay Mesa would be annexed in 1985.

In the north, there were many large-scale annexations made by the City of San Diego. In 1962, Rancho Bernardo was annexed by the city with plans to annex further up north. By the end of 1964, San Diego annexed most of what makes up the northern city-limits of San Diego, which included the current neighborhoods such as Rancho Peñasquitos, Carmel Valley, Pacific Highlands Ranch, Black Mountain Ranch, and San Pasqual Valley. San Diego's efforts to annex Poway failed, which incorporated into a city in 1980.

==== "City of villages" ====
In 1979, the City of San Diego adopted a tiered growth management categorization system as a component of the "Progress Guide and General Plan", which classified the entire city as either "Urbanized, Planned Urbanizing, or Future Urbanizing". This policy set the pace for the suburban sprawl north towards North County, as well as south bay sprawl in Otay Mesa from San Ysidro. This framework phased the development of the Torrey Highlands, Pacific Highlands Ranch, Black Mountain Ranch, and Del Mar Mesa under the North City Future Urbanizing Area Framework Plan, as well as Torrey Hills, Torrey Pines, and Rancho Encantada on separate circumstances. Rapid suburban growth after the 1980s replaced rural communities for large master planned suburban development as other small scale development fell out of favor, and new freeways were constructed to serve these new developments.

In 2006, the city of San Diego set its planning policy to be centered on the "city of villages" strategy, which would promote modest density and mixed-use development within 'village centers' as San Diego runs out of land to be developed.

=== Conventions ===
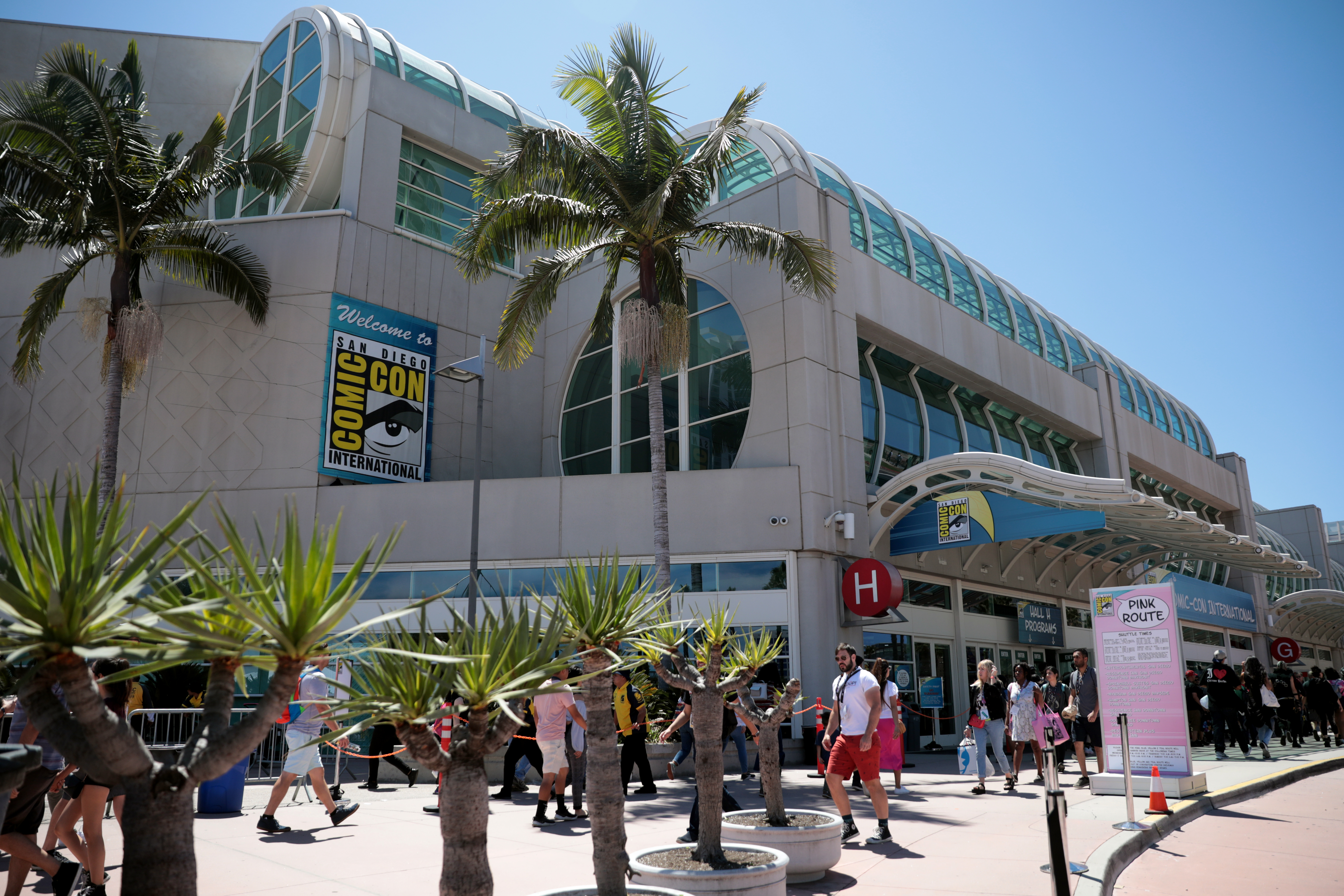
San Diego Convention Center

In July 1971 the Republican National Committee chose San Diego to be the site of the 1972 Republican National Convention, despite initial opposition from the city's mayor, Frank Curran, and despite the fact that the city did not initially bid for the opportunity. It was widely believed that San Diego was selected because it was the preferred choice of President Richard Nixon. The city and the party were making preparations for the convention when in March 1972 a $400,000 donation to the event by ITT Corporation was publicized and became a national scandal. In addition, there were ongoing problems with the proposed venue (the San Diego Sports Arena) and concerns about adequate hotel space. In May 1972 the Republican National Committee voted to move the convention to Miami, Florida. In response, Mayor Pete Wilson proclaimed the week of the convention as "America's Finest City Week", giving rise to the city's current unofficial slogan "America's Finest City".

The 1996 Republican National Convention was held in San Diego in August 1996, headquartered at the San Diego Convention Center.

The largest annual convention held in San Diego is San Diego Comic-Con, founded as San Diego's Golden State Comic Mini-con in 1970. According to Forbes, it is the "largest convention of its kind in the world".

=== Scandals ===
The United States National Bank, headquartered in San Diego and owned by C. Arnholt Smith, grew during the 1960s to become the 86th largest bank in the country with $1.2 billion in total assets. It failed in 1973 in the largest bank failure to date. The cause was bad loans to Smith-controlled companies, which exceeded the bank's legal lending limit. Smith had used the bank's money for his private business and bribed bank inspectors to cover it up. He was convicted of embezzlement and tax fraud and served seven months in federal prison in 1984.

During the 1980s the city was rocked by the disclosure that J. David & Co., an investment company run by the well-connected J. David "Jerry" Dominelli, was in reality a Ponzi scheme which had bilked hundreds of investors for an estimated $80 million. Dominelli was convicted in 1984 and served 10 years in prison. His affiliation with then-mayor Roger Hedgecock led to a pair of sensational trials in which Hedgecock was convicted of conspiracy and perjury in connection with contributions he received from Dominelli. Hedgecock was forced to resign from office; his convictions were eventually overturned, except for one which was reduced to a misdemeanor.

A civic scandal exploded in 2003 with the discovery that city finances had been manipulated with massive losses in the pension fund scandal. It left the city with an estimated $1.4 billion pension fund gap. One result was replacing the council-manager form of government with a mayor-council system in 2004. Although not charged with any wrongdoing, Mayor Dick Murphy resigned effective July 2005. Deputy Mayor Michael Zucchet took over as acting mayor but had to resign three days later, when he and fellow city councilmember Ralph Inzunza were convicted in federal court for taking bribes in a scheme to overturn the city's "no touch" law at strip clubs. Their felony conviction required them to resign from the city council. A third accused councilmember had died before trial. Zucchet's conviction was later overturned. Inzunza was sentenced to 21 months in prison.

In July 2013, Mayor Bob Filner was accused by multiple women of repeated sexual harassment, and many individuals and groups, including former supporters, called for him to resign. On August 19 Filner and city representatives entered a mediation process, as a result of which Filner agreed to resign, effective August 30, 2013, while the city agreed to limit his legal and financial exposure. Filner subsequently pleaded guilty to one felony count of false imprisonment and two misdemeanor battery charges, and was sentenced to house arrest and probation.

Beyond the issues regarding the city government, San Diego has experienced scandal on the Federal level as well. On November 28, 2005, Congressman Randy "Duke" Cunningham resigned after pleading guilty to bribery charges; he was sentenced to 8 years in prison.

== Ethnic and cultural groups history ==
=== Californios and Chicano/Hispanic ===
In 1830, San Diego had 520 residents, land was owned by the government, with only seven ranchos awarded to retired soldiers. In 1835, Mission San Diego was secularized, and more ranchos were authorized, however due to increasing attacks by Native Americans on Californios the ranchos were evacuated and abandoned. Thirty-One Californios, joined the American forces to retake Los Angeles. Californios were automatically conferred United States Citizenship when the Treaty of Guadalupe-Hidalgo was signed. After 1848 the Californios constituted a numerical majority and owned most of the property; they secured cultural and social recognition, but they failed to control the political system. During the 1850s most ranchero owners were "beleaguered and penniless landowners". By 1860, most had left the area and the remainder were on the decline economically.

In World War II Hispanics made major breakthroughs in employment San Diego and in nearby farm districts. They profited from the new skills, contacts, and experiences provided by the military, filled many newly opened unskilled labor jobs, gained some high-paying jobs in the military installations and aircraft factories, and were welcomed by the labor unions, especially the Cannery Workers Union.

Since the 1950s, advertisers have recognized the importance of Spanish language TV broadcasting, investing in Univisión and Telemundo. The relative youth of San Diego's Spanish-speaking population, with a median age of 26 in 2004, made them a particularly attractive target for advertisers in the early years of the 21st century. The younger generations of Hispanics in San Diego (and other ethnic groups as well) can seldom read Spanish and rapidly abandon the spoken form except in dealing with their elders. Rumbaut et al. conclude, "Mexican immigrants arriving today can expect only 5 of every 100 of their great grandchildren to speak fluent Spanish."

=== African Americans ===
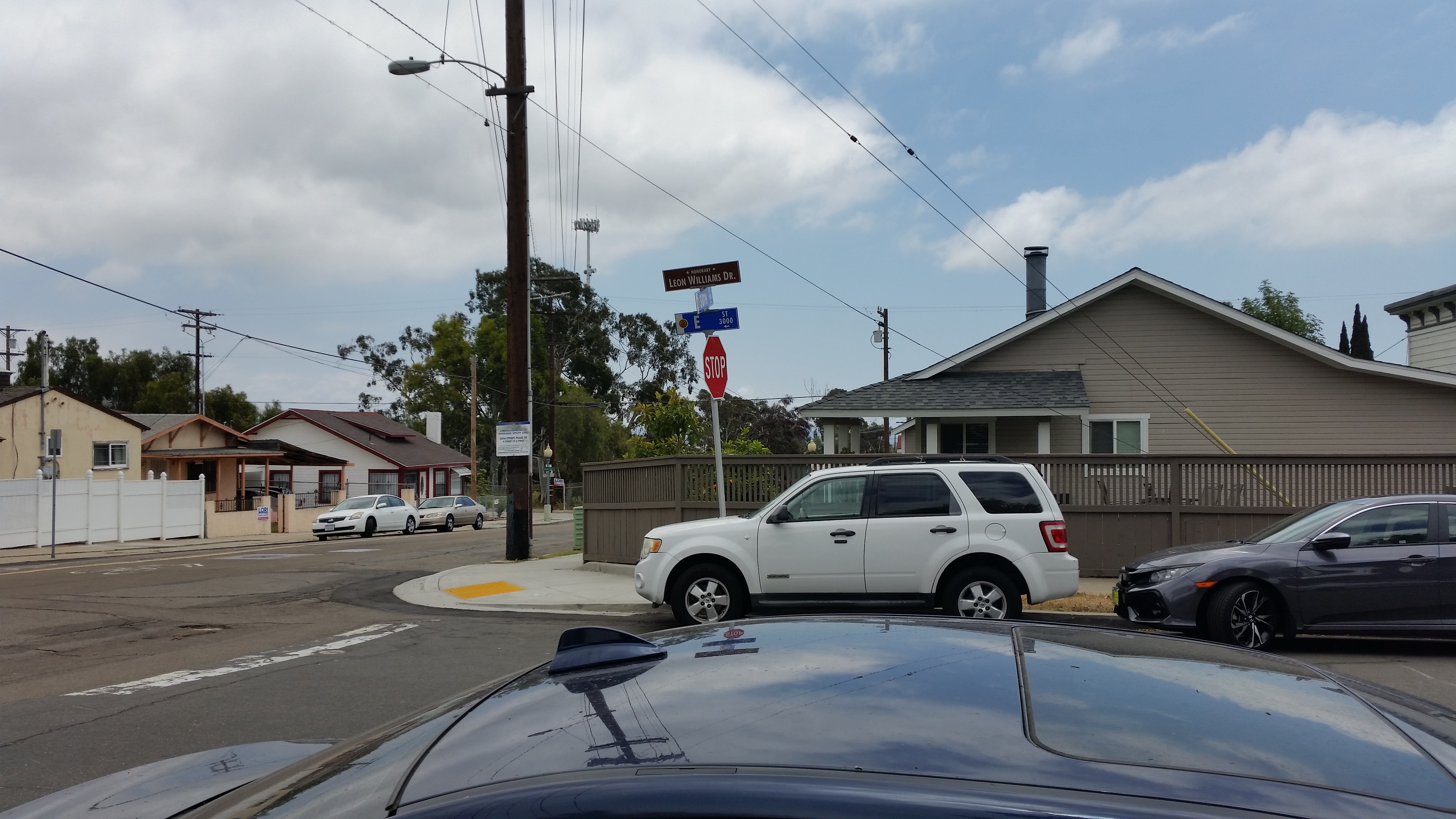
Honorary Leon Williams Dr., 2900 block of E Street, at its intersection with 30th Street

The African American population was small before the great naval expansion of World War II. Starting in 1953, the Urban League brought together black and white professionals and businessmen and encouraged white business owners to hire blacks. Unlike other Urban League chapters, it built coalitions with San Diego's Mexican American community. According to the 2010 United States census, African Americans are only 6.6% of San Diego's total population.

For over 100 years San Diego's second oldest neighborhood, Logan Heights, was home to African Americans. This neighborhood, together with Downtown and Sherman Heights, was one of only a few areas where blacks were allowed to buy and live in homes. After the 1960s and the Civil Rights Act, blacks started to move out of Logan Heights into area like Emerald Hills, Encanto and Oak Park. Logan Heights is still home to a great many black churches, some as old as 100 years old. On any given Sunday, hundreds of blacks return to Logan Heights to attend the churches they grew up in. Old Victorian homes still dot the Logan Heights area.

The founding fathers of the black community are all buried in the Logan Heights/Mountain View area in the Mount Hope Cemetery and Greenwood Cemetery. There are streets named after some of the founding fathers in Logan Heights, including Julian, Irving, and Logan. For more than 70 years the population of Logan Heights was 90% black, but starting in the 1980s its demographic shifted to predominantly Hispanic. The black population in San Diego has been shrinking. Many black San Diegans have moved back to Southern cities such as Atlanta, Dallas, Houston, Birmingham, Memphis, San Antonio and Jackson in a reverse great migration. The neighborhood has complained that it does not get suitable respect or attention from city leaders because of its minority status.

In 1969, Leon Williams became the first Black member of San Diego City Council. He would go on to become the first Black supervisor of the San Diego County Board of Supervisors in 1982.

The history of the African American community in San Diego from the 1940s to the 1980s is documented in the Baynard Collection, an exhibit of 120 selected photographs by Norman Baynard, who ran a photography studio in Logan Heights for 46 years. The collection is on display at the Jacobs Center for Neighborhood Innovation.

==== East African ====
Somalis began arriving in San Diego in the 1980s, as Somalis fled the Horn of Africa during the Ogaden War and the subsequent Somali Civil War. San Diego became a destination as Somali military personnel were already stationed with US troops in Camp Pendleton when the war broke out, who would then provide logistics and language assistance for local refugee resettlement. The refugee community concentrated around City Heights, among other war refugee groups. An estimated 10,000 Somalis lived in San Diego in the 2010s. Refugees from Sudan, Ethiopia, and Eritrea were also resettled in San Diego, making the city the largest East African community in California and is informally known as "Little Mogadishu".

=== Asian/Pacific Islanders ===
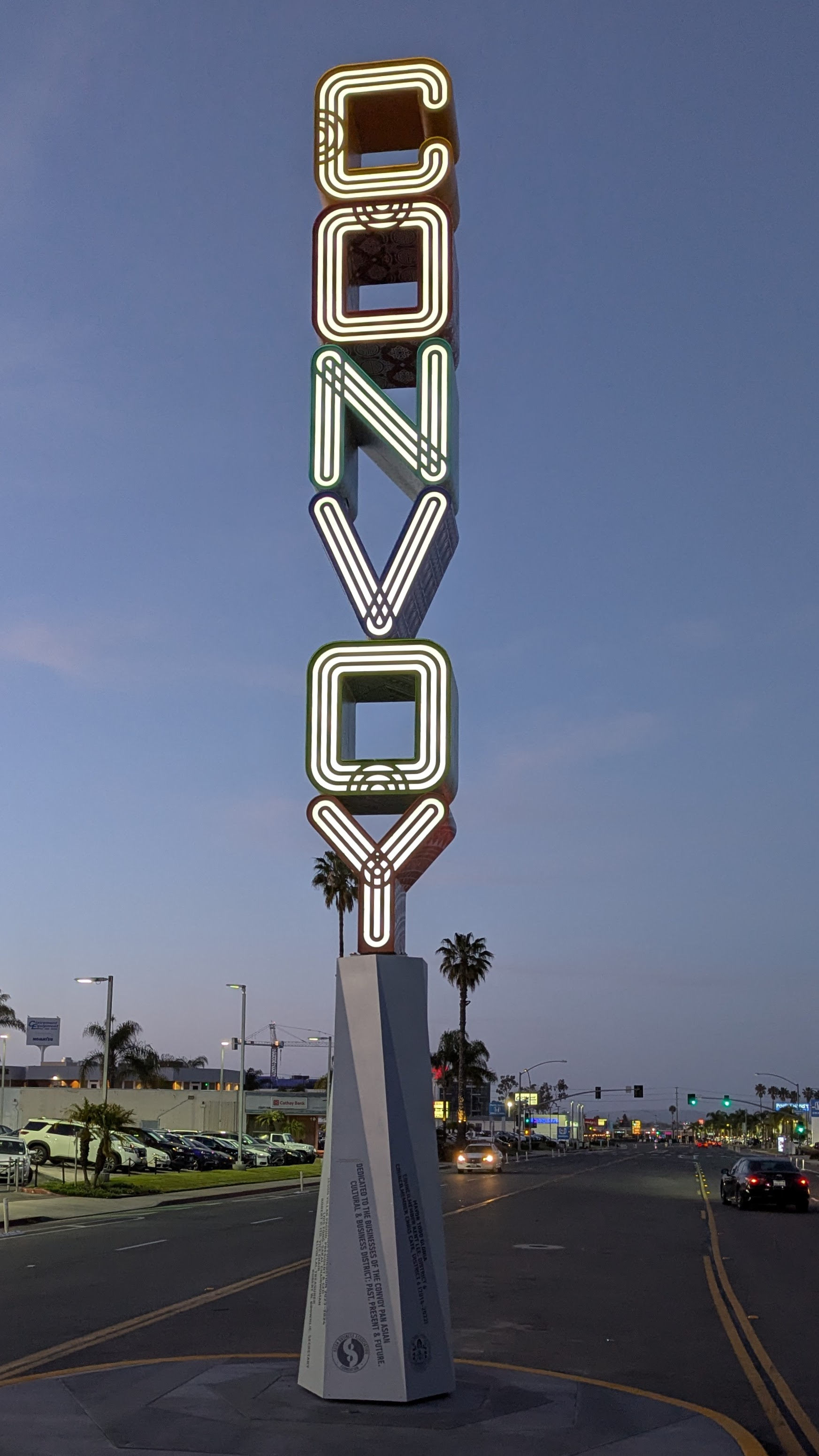
San Diego's Convoy District is home to numerous Asian shops and restaurants

==== Chinese ====
Immigrants from China began arriving in the 1860s and settled in two waterfront fishing villages, one in Point Loma, the other in the New Town area where the San Diego Convention Center now stands. Chinese were harshly discriminated against in California and forced into Chinatowns. In San Diego there was much more freedom; there were no attacks on the 50 or so Chinese fishermen based there. Indeed, they were pioneers in the industry in the 1860s; their peak came in the 1880s. They specialized in abalone for export to Chinese communities up and down the Pacific coast. One journalist reported, "Even the fins of the shark are eaten by Chinamen, and are by them esteemed to be a great delicacy—as much of a delicacy as a Chinaman would be to a shark." By the 1890s the fishermen had gone; some returned to China, others took jobs on land.

The Chinese continued to settle in San Diego and found work in the fishing industry, railroad construction, service industry, general construction work, food industry, and merchandising. They were forced into a closed Chinatown but otherwise received less violent attention than suffered by Chinese elsewhere in the West. Many details of the Chinese-American experience in the period were recorded by immigrant Ah Quin, who was a labor recruiter and merchant who kept a detailed diary of his life in San Diego from 1880 to 1902.

They soon formed district associations, family and clan associations, secret societies, and business guilds, including the Chee Kung Tong (est. 1885), the Chinese Consolidated Benevolent Association (est. 1907), the Bing Kung Tong (est. 1922), and the Ying On Tong (est. 1945). In the 1870s and 1880s, two Chinese Christian missions were organized to help the Chinese with housing, employment, recreational activities, and English language instruction. The Chinese population increased dramatically, especially after the 1965 Immigration Act allowed large numbers of businessmen and professionals to migrate from Hong Kong, Taiwan and China. During this period, San Diego elected its first nonwhite councilmember, Tom Hom of Chinese descent, to the San Diego City Council in 1963, and state assemblyman in 1968.

The late-20th-century San Diego Chinese community is made up of a heterogeneous population that includes Cantonese-speaking, Mandarin-speaking, and Hokkien-speaking members, as well as those from a variety of places of origin, including Southeast Asia. The center of San Diego's Chinese community slowly moved away from what is now Asian Pacific Thematic Historic District, and moved north with suburbanization and upper-middle class Chinese immigration to areas north of Interstate 8 and around Kearny Mesa, as well as areas north of MCAS Miramar in the I-15 Corridor and Carmel Valley. The main concentration of Chinese business in the region is centered in the Convoy District, which was dedicated as a Pan-Asian cultural district.

==== Filipinos ====
San Diego has historically been a popular destination for Filipino immigrants, and has contributed to the growth of its population. The first documentation of Filipinos arriving in San Diego, while part of the United States, occurred in 1903 when Filipino students arrived at State Normal School; they were followed as early as 1908 by Filipino Sailors serving in the United States Navy. Due to discriminatory housing policies of the time, the majority of Filipinos in San Diego lived downtown, around Market. Multiple businesses which catered to the Filipino community, both those who permanently lived in San Diego or who were migratory, existed in the area forming a hub to the Filipino American community, which lasted until at least the 1960s. Prior to World War II, due to anti-miscegenation laws, multi-racial marriages with Hispanic and Latino women were common, particularly with Mexicans.

After World War II, the majority of Filipino Americans in San Diego were associated with the U.S. Navy in one form or another, even in the late 1970s and early 1980s more than half of Filipino babies born in the greater San Diego area were born at Balboa Naval Hospital. In 1949, the first Filipino American building was opened in San Diego by the Filipino American Veteran's Association. In the 1970s, the typical Filipino family consisted of a husband whose employment was connected to the military, and a wife who was a nurse; this continued into the 1990s. Many Filipino American veterans, after completing active duty, would move out of San Diego, to the suburbs of Chula Vista and National City. Filipinos concentrated in the South Bay; more affluent Filipino Americans moved into the suburbs of North County, particularly Mira Mesa (sometimes referred to as "Manila Mesa"). Beginning in the late 1980s, the community experienced growth of gang activity, especially in South San Diego. A portion of California State Route 54 in San Diego is officially named the "Filipino-American Highway", in honor of the Filipino American Community.

==== Japanese ====
Before World War II there was a thriving Japanese community in San Diego. There were a few blocks in what is now the Gaslamp district where the Japanese community owned many businesses accompanied by Japanese language schools and Japanese run churches. The community was built on first and second generation Japanese immigrants called Issei and Nisei respectively. The Issei came to America looking for work, such as “the first Issei to make San Diego home was Tanaka Kohei who arrived in early 1887 to manufacture Japanese style charcoal.” As time went on and the Issei had children, they started settling down and forming businesses of their own. They could be found around 5th and Market, where they ran “pool halls, restaurants, barber shops, and boarding houses.” This area was home to “more than thirty-five Nikkei owned businesses within a two block area,” and was known as the Japanese business district. These businesses were a landmark in San Diego, leaving buildings that are still owned by Japanese-Americans today. Some churches still stand, and even played an essential role in the rebuilding of Japanese-American culture after World War II. During WWII these Japanese-owned businesses were left unattended when Japanese families were sent to internment camps.

==== Korean ====
The earliest Korean connection to the region traces back to the 1905 migration of more than one thousand Koreans to Yucatán, Mexico as indentured laborers on henequen plantations. In the decades that followed, some of their descendants gradually migrated north to Baja California, including Tijuana, where Korean churches and community organizations began to emerge by the mid-20th century. From there, a sizable number of Korean Mexicans families and individuals settled in San Diego. Broader waves of Korean immigration to San Diego began after the Korean War and increased significantly following the Immigration and Nationality Act of 1965. The community’s commercial identity emerged in 1979 with the opening of Zion Market in Kearny Mesa, providing Korean groceries and household goods. Korean businesses later became prominent in the Convoy District, which is part of a larger Pan-Asian commercial corridor formally recognized as the Convoy Pan-Asian Cultural & Business Innovation District. Korean American residents in San Diego are geographically dispersed, with many living in suburban neighborhoods throughout North County and inland communities.

==== Vietnamese ====
When the "first wave" of Vietnamese immigrants started to arrive in 1981, many settled in the communities adjacent to San Diego State University, such as City Heights and Talmadge, better known as East San Diego. As families and individuals became more affluent however, many relocated to other communities in the city: Linda Vista, Clairemont, Serra Mesa, etc. (Central San Diego) and what was then brand-new tract communities such as Mira Mesa, Rancho Penasquitos, Rancho Bernardo, etc.

In 2013, the Little Saigon Cultural and Commercial District was formed in City Heights on a six-block section of El Cajon Boulevard.

=== Middle Eastern ===
The region had an early Middle Eastern presence prior to contemporary US wars in the Middle East. Chaldeans, in particular, built a community in El Cajon in the mid 20th century, with the parish of the St. Peter Chaldean Catholic Cathedral established in 1973.

The first wave of migration from the Middle East to the San Diego region began during the Iraq War, as many Iraqis sought refuge from war-torn Iraq. Many found refuge in El Cajon, where the city has become the center of the region's Middle Eastern community and business, establishing a community informally known as "Little Baghdad". A large proportion of the community is made up of Chaldeans, largely Christian Iraqis (mostly Chaldean Catholic), as well as Afghan immigrants escaping from Afghanistan War, and other Arab and Persian groups. The region also received another influx of Syrian refugees escaping from the Syrian civil war throughout the 2010s. Members of this community have become business owners, civic leaders, and city council members in the region.

Another wave of migration came in the mid-2010s, after the Syrian civil war spilled over to Iraq when ISIS stormed into northern Iraq, which brought many more Chaldeans to East County San Diego with most being middle-class hailing from the Nineveh Governorate. This propelled the region to have the highest concentration of Chaldeans in the United States.

=== LGBT ===
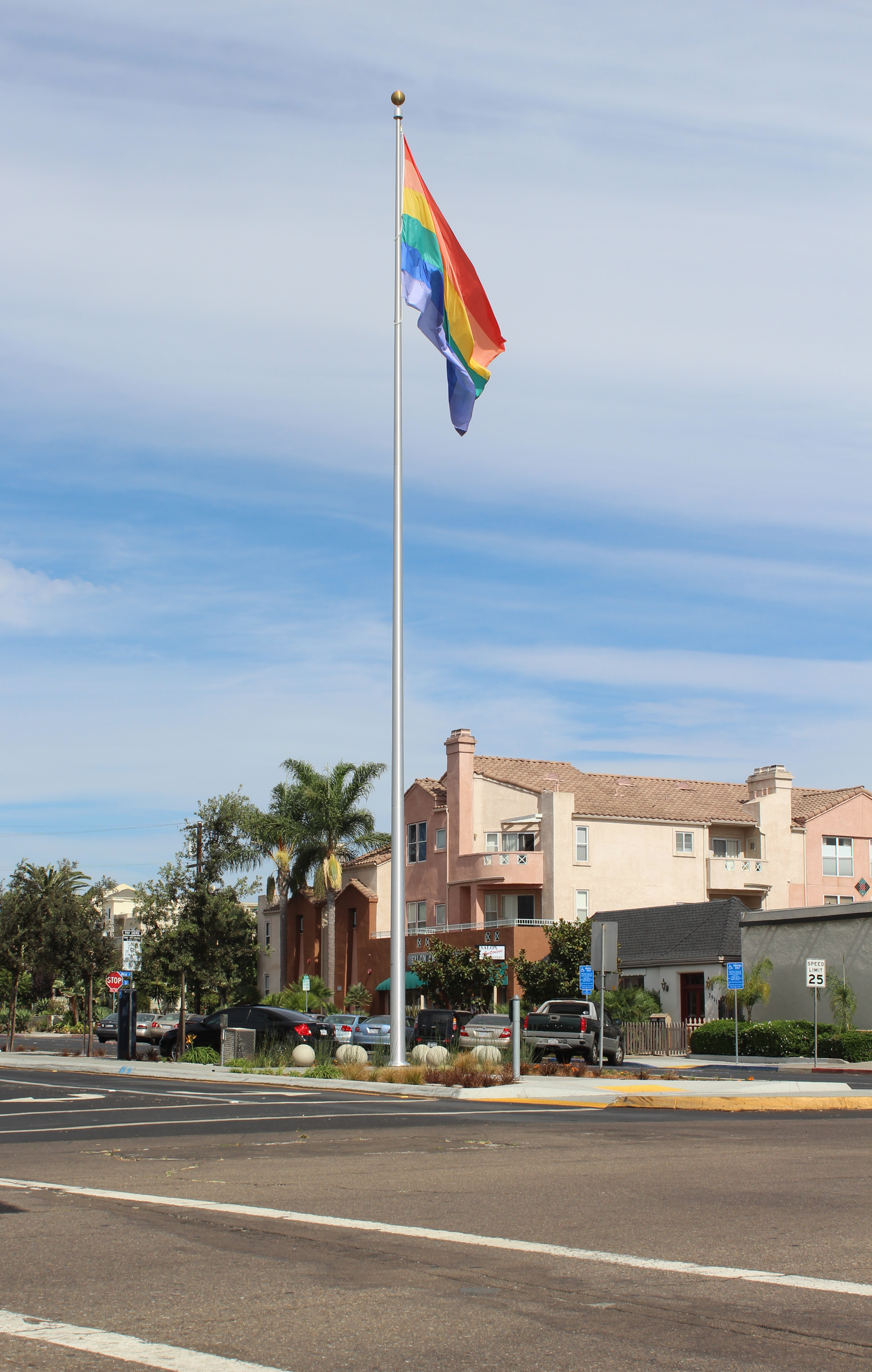
The Hillcrest Pride flag, erected in 2012

As a port city San Diego always had a gay and lesbian community, but it was largely closeted. Beginning in the 1960s the neighborhood of Hillcrest began to attract large numbers of gay and lesbian residents, drawn by low rents, high density, and the possibility of an urban dynamic. In the 1970s gay men founded a Center for Social Services in Hillcrest which became a social and political focus for the gay community. In June 1974 they launched the first Gay Pride Parade, which has been held every year since, and Hillcrest is well recognized as the focal point of the LGBT community. Also in the 1970s several churches, especially the independent Metropolitan Community Church, as well as movements within established denominations like Dignity (Roman Catholic), Integrity (Episcopalian), and Lutherans Concerned, formed a coalition that helped gays reinterpret biblical passages condemning homosexuality, and reconcile their sexual orientation with their religious faith. All of this helped to promote public understanding.

Many LGBT politicians have successfully run for office in San Diego city and county, including Christine Kehoe, former state senator, state assembly member, and city councilmember; Bonnie Dumanis, county district attorney; Toni Atkins, state assemblymember, former city councilmember; Carl DeMaio, former city councilmember; Todd Gloria, city council president, former interim mayor, and current mayor; and Dave Roberts, county supervisor.

In 2011 San Diego was the first city in the country in which active and retired military service members marched openly in a gay pride parade, in anticipation of the imminent removal of the "Don't ask, don't tell" rule for U.S. military personnel. They did not wear military uniforms, but rather T-shirts with the name of their branch of service. The following year, 2012, San Diego again made history when the U.S. Department of Defense granted permission for military personnel to wear their uniforms while participating the San Diego Pride Parade. This was the first time that United States military personnel were permitted to wear their service uniforms in such a parade. Also in 2012, the parade started from Harvey Milk Street, the first street in the nation to be named after gay civil rights icon Harvey Milk, and proceeded past a huge new rainbow flag, which was raised for the first time on July 20, 2012, to kick off the Pride festival.

== See also ==
- Timeline of San Diego
- Bibliography of California history
