= Sycamore (disambiguation) =

Sycamore is the common name for several different species of trees.

Sycamore may also refer to:

== Music ==
- "The Sycamore", a 1904 Scott Joplin ragtime composition
- Drew Sycamore, stage name of Danish singer and songwriter Drew Kolstrup (born 1990)
- Sycamore Smith, stage name of American musician Marc Smith
- "Sycamore", a 1987 song by Negativland from the album Escape from Noise
- "Sycamore", a 2020 song by The White Buffalo
- "Sycamore", a 2023 song by Ed Sheeran from the album −

== Places in the United States ==
=== Communities ===
- Sycamore, Alabama, an unincorporated community
- Sycamore, California, a former settlement
- Sycamore, former name of Herndon, California, an unincorporated community
- Sycamore, Delaware, an unincorporated community
- Sycamore, Georgia, a city
- Sycamore, Illinois, a city
- Sycamore, Indiana, an unincorporated community
- Sycamore, Kansas, a census-designated place
- Sycamore, Kentucky, a home rule-class city
- Sycamore, Missouri, an unincorporated community
- Sycamore, Ohio, a village
- Sycamore, Delaware County, Oklahoma, a census-designated place
- Sycamore, Sequoyah County, Oklahoma, a census-designated place
- Sycamore, Pennsylvania, an unincorporated community
- Sycamore, South Carolina, a town
- Sycamore, Texas - see List of ghost towns in Texas
- Sycamore, Virginia, an unincorporated community
- Sycamore, Calhoun County, West Virginia, an unincorporated community
- Sycamore, Logan County, West Virginia, an unincorporated community
- Sycamore Township (disambiguation)

=== Geographical features ===
- Sycamore Branch, a stream in Missouri
- Sycamore Canyon (disambiguation)
- Sycamore Creek (disambiguation)
- Sycamore Island (Pennsylvania)
- Sycamore Shoals, on the Watauga River near Elizabethton, Tennessee

=== Other places ===
- Sycamore Ranger Station, Prescott National Forest, Arizona, on the National Register of Historic Places
- Sycamore State Park, Trotwood, Ohio

== Businesses ==
- Sycamore Bank, a regional bank in Mississippi
- Sycamore Networks, an optical transmission hardware manufacturer
- Sycamore Pictures, an American production company

== Schools in the United States ==
- Sycamore High School (Sycamore, Illinois)
- Sycamore High School (Cincinnati, Ohio)
- Sycamore Junior High School, Montgomery, Ohio, in the Sycamore Community School District
- Sycamore Junior High School, Orange County, California, in the Anaheim Union High School District
- Sycamore School, Indianapolis, Indiana, a private school - see List of schools in Indianapolis

== Ships ==
- MV Sycamore, a Royal Australian Navy training ship
- USS Nutmeg, formerly named Sycamore, a U.S. Navy net laying ship
- USCGC Sycamore (WAGL-268), a U.S. Coast Guard river tender
- USCGC Sycamore (WLB-209), a U.S. Coast Guard sea going buoy tender

== Transportation ==
- Bristol Sycamore, an early helicopter design
- Chayair Sycamore, South African autogyro
- Sycamore Street (Decatur), Georgia, United States
- Sycamore station (Illinois), a railway station on the National Register of Historic Places

== People ==
- Edward Sycamore (1855–1930), British yacht skipper
- Graham Sycamore (born 1941/2), New Zealand former cyclist and city councillor
- Mattilda Bernstein Sycamore (born 1973), American author and activist

== Other uses ==
- Sycamore (moth), a species of moth
- Sycamore processor, a quantum processor created by Google
- Indiana State Sycamores, the intercollegiate athletic program of Indiana State University
- Sycamore States, a Grade III American Thoroughbred horse race
- Sycamore Land Trust, headquartered in Bloomington, Indiana
- Professor Sycamore, a Pokémon character

== See also ==
- Sykamore, stage name of Canadian country music artist Jordan Ostrom (fl. 2013–present)
- SycAmour, post-hardcore band from Ypsilanti, Michigan
