= SYC =

SYC may refer to:

== Yacht clubs ==
- Sayville Yacht Club, in Blue Point, New York, US
- Sligo Yacht Club, in County Sligo, Ireland
- Squantum Yacht Club, in Quincy, Massachusetts, US

== Youth organizations ==
- Scottish Young Conservatives
- Sierra Youth Coalition, Canada
- Singapore Youth Choir
- Somali Youth Club
- Student-Youth Council, Georgia

== Other ==
- SYc, Yenko Super Car
- Seychelles, an archipelago nation in the Indian Ocean
- South Yemen Cup, defunct association football cup of South Yemen
- Syriac language (ISO 639-3: SYC)
- Edward Sycamore (1855–1930), British sailing skipper
