= Old Chinatown =

Old Chinatown could refer to one of the following places:

- Chinatown, San Francisco
- First Chinatown, Toronto
- Old Chinatown, Los Angeles
- Old Chinatown, San Diego
- Old Chinatown, Cleveland
