= South Yemeni League =

Association football league in South Yemen

The South Yemeni Football League or the People's Democratic Republic of Yemen Football League was an association football league held for domestic football clubs in South Yemen held between 1970 and 1990. The league was folded when South and North Yemen unified as one country (Yemen) on 22 May 1990. This resulted in the creation of the Yemeni League.

Al-Tilal have a record six South Yemen league titles, making them the most successful out of this competition. The domestic cup was the South Yemen Cup.

== Title winners ==
- 1970/71 - Al-Tilal
- 1975/76 - Al-Wahda
- 1976/77 - Al-Tilal
- 1979/80 - Al-Tilal
- 1981/82 - Al-Tilal
- 1982/83 - Al-Tilal
- 1983/84 - Al-Shorta
- 1986/87 - Al-Tilal
- 1987/88 - Al-Wahda
- 1988/89 - Al-Wahda
- 1989/90 - Al-Shula
