= Sycamore Township =

Sycamore Township may refer to the following places in the United States:

- Sycamore Township, DeKalb County, Illinois
- Sycamore Township, Butler County, Kansas
- Sycamore Township, Montgomery County, Kansas, Montgomery County, Kansas
- Sycamore Township, Hamilton County, Ohio
- Sycamore Township, Wyandot County, Ohio

== See also ==
- Sycamore (disambiguation)
