= Sycamore Creek =

Sycamore Creek may refer to:

- Sycamore Creek (Contra Costa County), a stream in California
- Sycamore Creek (Kings River), a stream in California
- Sycamore Creek (Santa Clara County), a stream in California
- Sycamore Creek (Michigan), a stream in Michigan
- Sycamore Creek (Crabtree Creek tributary), a stream in North Carolina
- Sycamore Creek (Kinney County, Texas), a stream in Texas
- Sycamore Creek (Tarrant County, Texas)

== See also ==
- Sycamore Branch
