= Sycamore Canyon (disambiguation) =

Sycamore Canyon may refer to:

== United States ==
Arizona

- Sycamore Canyon (Cochise County, Arizona), a canyon near Fort Huachuca
- Sycamore Canyon (Gila County, Arizona), a canyon near the Salt River Canyon Wilderness
- Sycamore Canyon (Pima County, Arizona), a canyon in the Pusch Ridge Wilderness Area
- Sycamore Canyon (Yavapai County, Arizona), a canyon in the Sycamore Canyon Wilderness

California

- Sycamore Canyon (San Diego County, California), a canyon near Dulzura, California
- Sycamore Canyon (Ventura County, California), a canyon in the Santa Monica Mountains in Newbury Park, California

Texas

- Sycamore Canyon (Texas), a canyon in Val Verde County, Texas

== See also ==
- Sycamore Canyon Test Facility
