= Mission Branch =

Stream in the US state of Missouri

Mission Branch is a stream in Bates County in the U.S. state of Missouri. It is a tributary of Sycamore Branch. The stream headwaters are at 38°08′54″N 94°12′47″W and the stream flows to the southwest to its confluence with Sycamore Branch at 38°05′16″N 94°15′44″W within the floodplain of the Marais des Cygnes River.

Mission Branch took its name from an Indian mission near its banks.

== See also ==
- List of rivers of Missouri
