= History of newspapers in California =

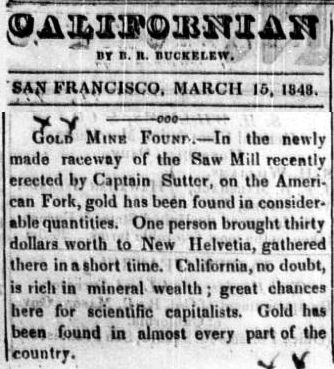
An article from the March 15, 1848 edition of The Californian describing the discovery of gold at Sutter's Mill.

The history of newspapers in California dates back to 1846, with the first publication of The Californian in Monterey. Since then California has been served by a large number of newspapers based in many cities.

== History ==
The first newspaper published by Americans in California was The Californian, printed in Monterey in 1846 announcing the Mexican–American War, written half in English and half Spanish. The press was moved to San Francisco and printing started up again on May 22, 1847, in competition with the weekly California Star published by Mormon pioneer Sam Brannan, beginning that January. Both efforts suspended publication in the face of the California Gold Rush. By August, The Californian had resumed publication, but by November 1848, both papers were bought and merged then renamed the Alta California. The press that once printed The Californian was moved to the Sacramento area to be used on the Placer Herald. The press was again moved and began publishing the Motherlode's first paper, the Sonora Herald, then taken to Columbia to print the Columbia Star. Within a few years of gold discovery, mother lode towns all had multiple competing journals.

San Jose, California's first city, has one of the oldest newspapers in the state. The San Jose Mercury was founded in 1851 as the San Jose Weekly Visitor, while the San Jose News was founded in 1883. In 1942 the Mercury purchased the News and continued publishing both newspapers, with the Mercury as the morning paper and the News as the evening paper. In 1983 the papers were merged into the San Jose Mercury News, with morning and afternoon editions. Eventually the less-popular afternoon edition was dropped, so at present the newspaper publishes only as a morning paper. The newspaper has earned several awards, including two Pulitzer Prizes, one in 1986 for reporting regarding political corruption in the Ferdinand Marcos administration in the Philippines, and one in 1989 for their comprehensive coverage of the Loma Prieta earthquake. The Mercury News was also named one of the five best-designed newspapers in the world by the Society for News Design for work done in 2001.

Los Angeles's first paper, La Estrella de Los Angeles or The Los Angeles Star, began publishing in May, 1851, also half in Spanish (until 1855). The Southern Californian began in July, 1854, and an all Spanish paper, El Clamor Publico, began competing for Spanish-speaking readers in June 1855. San Diego's first paper was the Herald, established in May 1851. Before 1860, California had 57 newspapers and periodicals serving an average readership of 290,000.

The Mountain Democrat, located in Placerville, CA, is the oldest newspaper in California, boasting continuous publication since 1851. The Mountain Democrat is a local newspaper covering news, sports, and features in El Dorado County.

The oldest continuously operated paper on the North Coast (also the oldest paper north of Sacramento) is the Eureka Times-Standard, which has been in continuous publication since it began as the Humboldt Times in September 1854. Its longest operating competitor was the Humboldt Standard, which began in 1875. After many years competing as independent dailies, both papers were managed as separate operations under the same owner for a brief period before being combined in 1967, which resulted in the current name. Local ownership also ended in 1967.

The Mountain Messenger, located in Sierra County, is California's oldest weekly publication, established in 1852. The adjudicated paper continues to be published on Thursday each week in Downieville by Carl Butz, who bought the paper from long-time editor Don Russell in 2020.

Not far behind that, "The Trinity Journal" in Weaverville, Trinity County, began publication in January 1856. David E. Gordon and Harry Seaman were founding partners.

James King of William began publishing the Daily Evening Bulletin in San Francisco in October, 1855 and built it into the highest circulation paper in San Francisco. He criticized a city supervisor named James P. Casey, who on the afternoon when the story about him had run in the paper, shot and mortally wounded King. Casey was lynched by the early vigilante committee. The Morning Call was established and began publishing in December 1856, and later merged with the Bulletin to become the long running Call-Bulletin.

The Sacramento Bee hit the streets in February, 1857 under the editorship of James McClatchy who began agitating on behalf of farmers against destructive practices of cattle ranching and hydraulic mining interests.

During the American Civil War outspoken criticism of the federal government by the editor of The Los Angeles Star led to the Star being banned from the mails, and the arrest of its editor for treason. Banned from the use of the U.S. Mail in 1864 it published its last issue in October 1864. When the Los Angeles Star ceased publication its press and equipment were sold to pro Union Phineas Banning who started printing the Wilmington Star; the paper soon changed its name to the Wilmington Journal. In 1868, the paper announced that since Los Angeles already had a strong pro Union paper in the Los Angeles Weekly Republican, (published from 1867 to 1879), there was no longer any need for continuing publication of the Wilmington Journal.

The San Francisco Chronicle debuted in June, 1865 as the Dramatic Chronicle, founded by Charles and M.H. de Young aged 19 and 17. Colonel (later General) Harrison Gray Otis took over management of two Los Angeles papers and established the Los Angeles Times.

In 1887, young William Randolph Hearst took over his father's San Francisco Daily Examiner which became the flagship of his national chain.

Fremont Older became editor of the San Francisco Bulletin in 1895 and took up the struggle against the powerful Southern Pacific Railroad and along with a fellow Californian Lincoln Steffens, became a well known muckraker and the first objective observer to accuse District Attorney Charles Fickert for the framing of labor radical Thomas Mooney.

Other cities have had their own long surviving papers, including the Fresno Morning Republican, the Fresno Bee, and the Oakland Tribune.

On October 1, 1910, a bomb exploded at the L.A. Times building, killing 21 workers. Labor activists were blamed for the bombing, but the San Francisco Daily News, a four-penny paper started in 1903, defended them. The Daily News joined the Scripps-Howard in 1921. The People's World began publishing in 1938, the first leftist daily published in the West.

== Newspapers for minority communities ==
The oldest African-American newspaper, still active in the 1930s, was the California Eagle. It appeared first in Los Angeles in 1879. The first French journals, the Californien and the Gazette Republicane both began in 1850, and were followed by the Courrier du Pacifique in 1852. Both the first German and first Italian papers, the California Demokrat (1852) and the Voce del Popolo (1859) were founded in San Francisco and had long runs. The Chinese in California have published many newspapers, the first was the Gold Hills News in 1854.
