= Little Saigon, San Diego =

Coordinates: 32.7554°N 117.0958°W

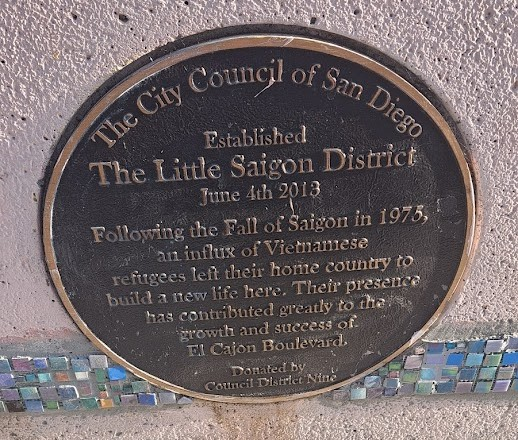
- Interactive map of Little Saigon, San Diego
- Established: June 4, 2013

Little Saigon, San Diego is a Vietnamese ethnic enclave in City Heights, San Diego, located on El Cajon Boulevard between Euclid and Highland avenues.

== History ==
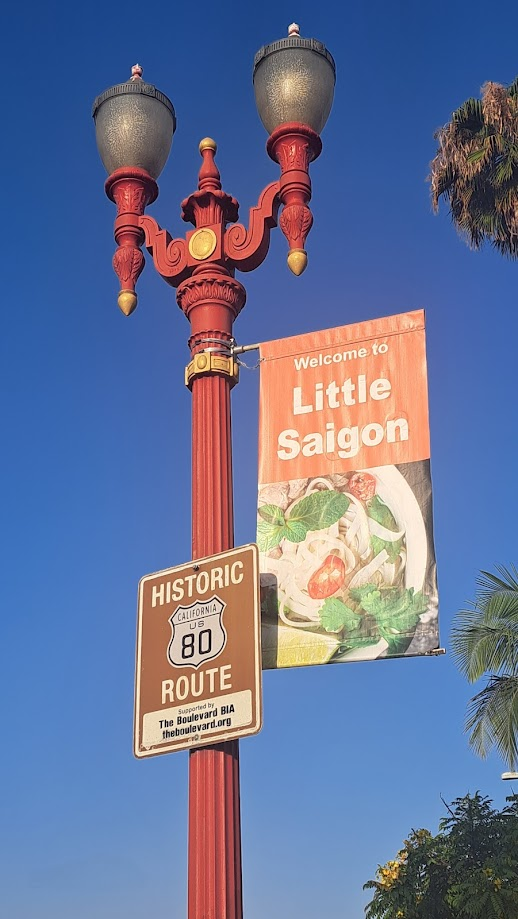
Little Saigon Banner on historic lamp-post at El Cajon Boulevard and 47th Street.

The Little Saigon San Diego Foundation was established in November 2008 with a stated mission to "revitalize the densely populated Vietnamese business district of El Cajon Boulevard."

On June 4, 2013, City Council approved Little Saigon Cultural and Commercial District in City Heights, which is a six-block section of El Cajon Boulevard from Euclid to Highland avenues. The district would be known as a center for Vietnamese food and culture. Since 2013, the Little Saigon San Diego Foundation has organized one of the Vietnamese New Year (Tết) events in the city with the annual Lunar New Year festival at SDCCU Stadium, where proceeds would go towards developing and promoting the district.

On February 1, 2019, Little Saigon signs near the El Cajon Boulevard exits on Interstate 15 were unveiled.

== See also ==
- Asian Pacific Thematic Historic District
