= Ah Quin =

Chinese-American 19th century diarist

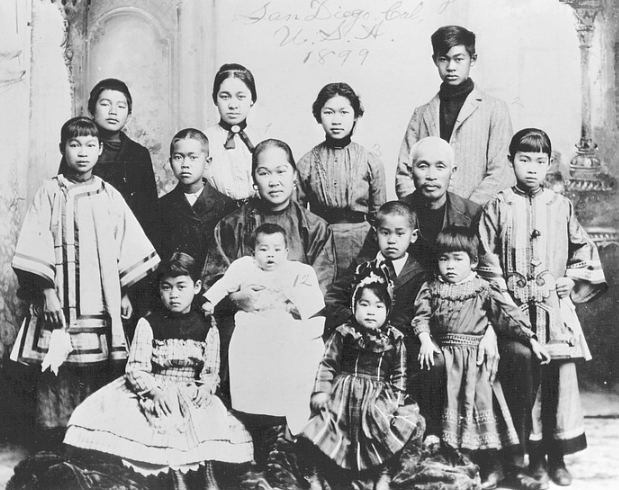
- Ah Quin, with his wife and 12 children, in 1901
- Born: December 5, 1848; Guangdong province, China
- Died: February 8, 1914; San Diego, California
- Spouse: Ah Sue
- Children: 12

Ah Quin (originally Tom Chong Kwan, Chinese simplied:湯崇權; 1848 – 1914) was a Chinese-American who emigrated to the United States in 1868 and kept a detailed diary of his experiences over 25 years, between 1877 and 1902. He worked in a number of professions that were landmark Chinese-American experiences of the era: as a cook, merchant, and in the mining and railroad industries. The 11-volume diary is the earliest known English-language manuscript written by a Chinese immigrant to the United States and an important source of information chronicling the Chinese experience in nineteenth-century America, during the "Age of Chinese Exclusion".

== Early life ==
Ah Quin was born in the Kaiping District of Guangdong Province in southern China on December 5, 1848. He was the eldest of three siblings. He knew some English before coming to the United States, which he learned at an American missionary school. His family sent him to California in 1868, where he arrived in San Francisco. Although his family name was "Tom" and his Chinese name written Tom Chong Kwan, it was modified, as was common with many immigrants, and recorded as Ah Quin.

He lived in San Francisco’s Chinatown for the first six years he was in the country. He worked at a variety of jobs including houseboy and cook, and continued his studies at a Christian mission, while an uncle helped to support him financially. In 1873 he moved to Santa Barbara, where he became a merchant. In this period he also became a Christian and helped to organize a Sabbath school for the Chinese community there.

== Diary ==
In 1877 Ah Quin took a job as a cook in a coal mining camp on a tiny island off the coast of Alaska. It was in this period that he began the diary. One of his earliest entries was recording the sorrow of leaving his friends: "See all the Friends and Teachers good by to them they feel sorry and some cry because they may not see me no more". In the camp he cooked two meals a day on a tiny camp stove. He detailed his work, writing, "I cleaned 43 fish in three hours", or "I made 120 cookies today", as well as writing of his relationship with the miners, seeing snow for the first time, the plague of mosquitoes in summer, and recording Bible passages. In June 1878 he asked his boss to cut off his queue, a significant symbol of his Chinese heritage, so he could "just look like the white people."

In 1878 he returned to California, and while in San Francisco was offered a job as a labor recruiter for the California Southern Railroad being built between San Diego and Barstow, California. He moved to San Diego in 1880, and in addition to working for the railroad, he opened a variety store in the Stingaree district near the waterfront. The area was notorious for its saloons, gambling houses, and brothels, but also was where the small Chinese community was located. Ah Quin's store catered to that community, offering "Chinese and Japanese fancy goods, teas, cigars & notions."

During the entire period, and for long stretches of the next two decades, Ah Quin kept his diary. The diary is written primarily in English, but some excerpts or notations are in Chinese. Researcher Susie Lan Cassel speculates that part of his motivation for keeping the diary was simply to practice his English. Some passages may have been written in Chinese to maintain privacy. For example, a note about a white man who he felt disrespected him is in Chinese. He recorded recipes almost entirely in Chinese. On every entry he wrote the Gregorian calendar date and the equivalent date in the Chinese calendar, as if to maintain his dual connections.

The diary is notable because primary sources of accounts of Chinese-American life in the late 19th century are very rare. They were even more rare because of the San Francisco earthquake and fire of 1906, which destroyed nearly the entire city, killed 3,000 people, and destroyed much of the written record of Chinese-America of the time. Since Ah Quin lived in San Diego, his diary avoided this fate.

The other reason for its notability is that it intersected one of the most intense periods of anti-Chinese sentiment in American history. Anti-Chinese feeling had brewed for years, from the 1860s and before, but was particularly violent in the late 19th century. The Chinese Exclusion Act of 1882 prohibited all immigration of Chinese laborers for 10 years. Numerous anti-Chinese massacres and expulsions occurred in this period: the Los Angeles Chinese massacre of 1871, the San Francisco riot of 1877, the anti-Chinese riot in Denver of 1880, the expulsion of Chinese from Eureka, California in 1885, the Rock Springs, Wyoming massacre of 1885, the Chinese Massacre Cove killings of 1887, among others. Violence or the threat of it was a part of everyday life for many Chinese people living in the United States. Author Michael Luo describes this as "the driving out", in which dozens of communities in the Western U.S. forcibly expelled Chinese people. Researcher Susie Lan Cassel described it as the Chinese Exclusion Era.

The diary is also noteworthy for its apparent honesty. While still a bachelor Ah Quin recorded that he went to shows, gambled, did some drinking, and visited both white and Chinese brothels, all while continuing his study of Scripture.

In December 1881, Ah Quin travelled to San Francisco to marry a 20-year-old woman named Leong Shee, who was also known as Ah Sue. Ah Sue had been rescued from prostitution by a Missionary Society of the Presbyterian Church. Since the Page Act of 1875, the number of Chinese women allowed to enter the country had been severely restricted, and it was a common fate for many of those few who did enter to be forced into prostitution. Ah Quin was a prominent enough man at the time that as the couple passed down the coast from San Francisco to San Diego, their marriage was announced by three separate newspapers.

The couple had their first child in 1883, a girl named Annie, and in 1885 a boy named George, who the San Diego Union announced as "the first male Chinese child born here". The couple went on to have 12 children. The youngest was named McKinley, after the American president.

In December 1890, Ah Quin appeared in San Diego before a Federal congressional subcommittee conducting a fact-finding investigation of Chinese immigration. While most of the few Chinese who had been interviewed had done so through an interpreter, Ah Quin apparently countered some of the committee's stereotypes with his Western clothing, fluent English, and the fact that he was a Christian, owned property, and was a successful businessman.

Ah Quin's diary entries chronicled his daily life and by themselves give insight into how a person lived in the era. He described what he and his family ate, how he cared for his children when they were sick, and the details of his businesses. He also wrote on occasion about the societal issues affecting Chinese life. As an example he wrote of the "Irish" trying to force factories to "discharge all our Chinese". He recounted the "disgrace" of an incident in which he was refused entry to a railroad car of white coworkers, even though he had the fairly high status of labor recruiter.

After he left railroad employment, he expanded his merchandising business and acquired real estate, including land he leased to farmers. Ah Quin became a respected leader in the San Diego community, served as a translator in the court system, and was a donor to charitable causes. He was sometimes referred to unofficially as the “Mayor of Chinatown.” He retired as an influential merchant in the city.

== Death and legacy ==
Ah Quin died on February 8, 1914 when he was struck by a motorcycle in San Diego.

The diaries were discovered by Ah Quin's great-grandson Dr. Thomas Quin Kong, in leather-bound volumes, in his mother's closet after she died in 1977. He later wrote a novel based on a fictionalized account of the struggles of four generations of his Chinese-American family, entitled "Tian Ming: Destiny", published in 1999. Kong donated the diaries to the San Diego History Center.
