= Student-Youth Council =

Georgian non-government organization

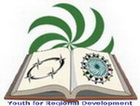
- Founded: 30.05.2002
- Type: NGO
- Registration no.: 44/9-91
- Location: Ozurgeti, Georgia
- Region served: Regional
- Website: www.syc.ge
- Formerly called: "Council of Student Unions"

The Student-Youth Council (SYC) (Georgian name: სტუდენტურ-ახალგაზრდული სათათბირო) is a Georgian non-governmental youth organisation based in Ozurgeti, Guria, Georgia.

== Mission ==
- Student-Youth Council* is a public union, which aims at solving the problems that youth and students are facing by protecting their rights, promoting knowledge and skills, filling informational gap, realizing youth's intellectual, creative, cultural and sport potentials.

== Activities ==
Nowadays the organization works in following programmes: - Youth integration and assistance for their active involvement in public life; - Assistance for to promote and develop volunteering; - Assistance for to establish and develop democratic govern/self-govern.

Organization is a founder of Youth Union *EuroClub* - www.euroclub.syc.ge

== Associated organizations ==
- Member of Georgian National Platform *Eastern Partnership Civil Society Forum*
- International development alliance
- Youth organization forum of Georgia
- National council of youth organizations, Georgia.
- International youth organization.
- Youth European network.
- European network against nationalism, racism, fascism and in support of migrants and refugees.
- European youth campaign for diversity, human rights and participation - all different, all equal.
- Code of Ethics for Georgian Civil Society Organizations*.

== See also ==
- Student-Youth Council Official Website.
- Student-Youth Council Youtube Channel.
- Student-Youth Council Facebook page.
