= Asian Pacific Thematic Historic District =

Historic Chinatown in San Diego, California, US

Coordinates: 32.7105°N 117.1610°W

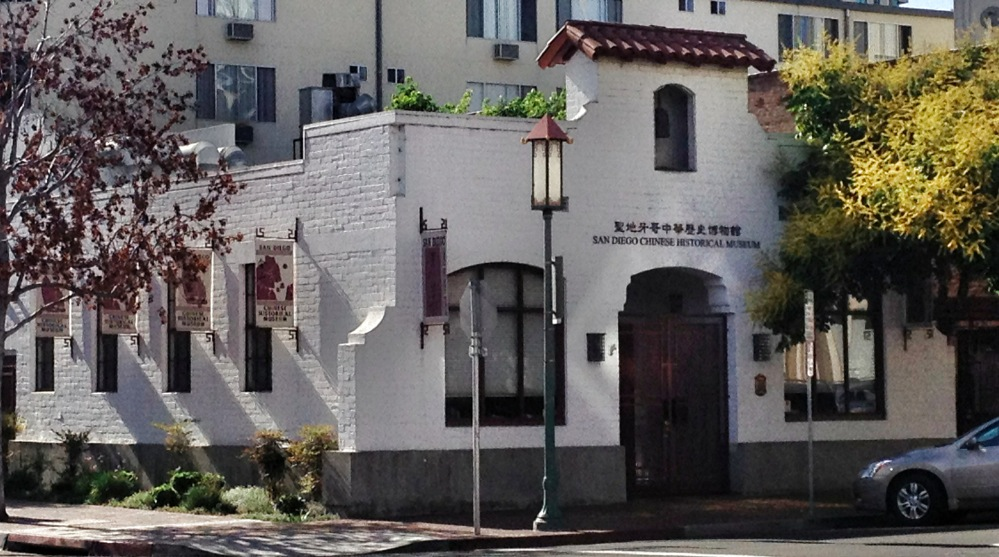
San Diego Chinese Historical Museum

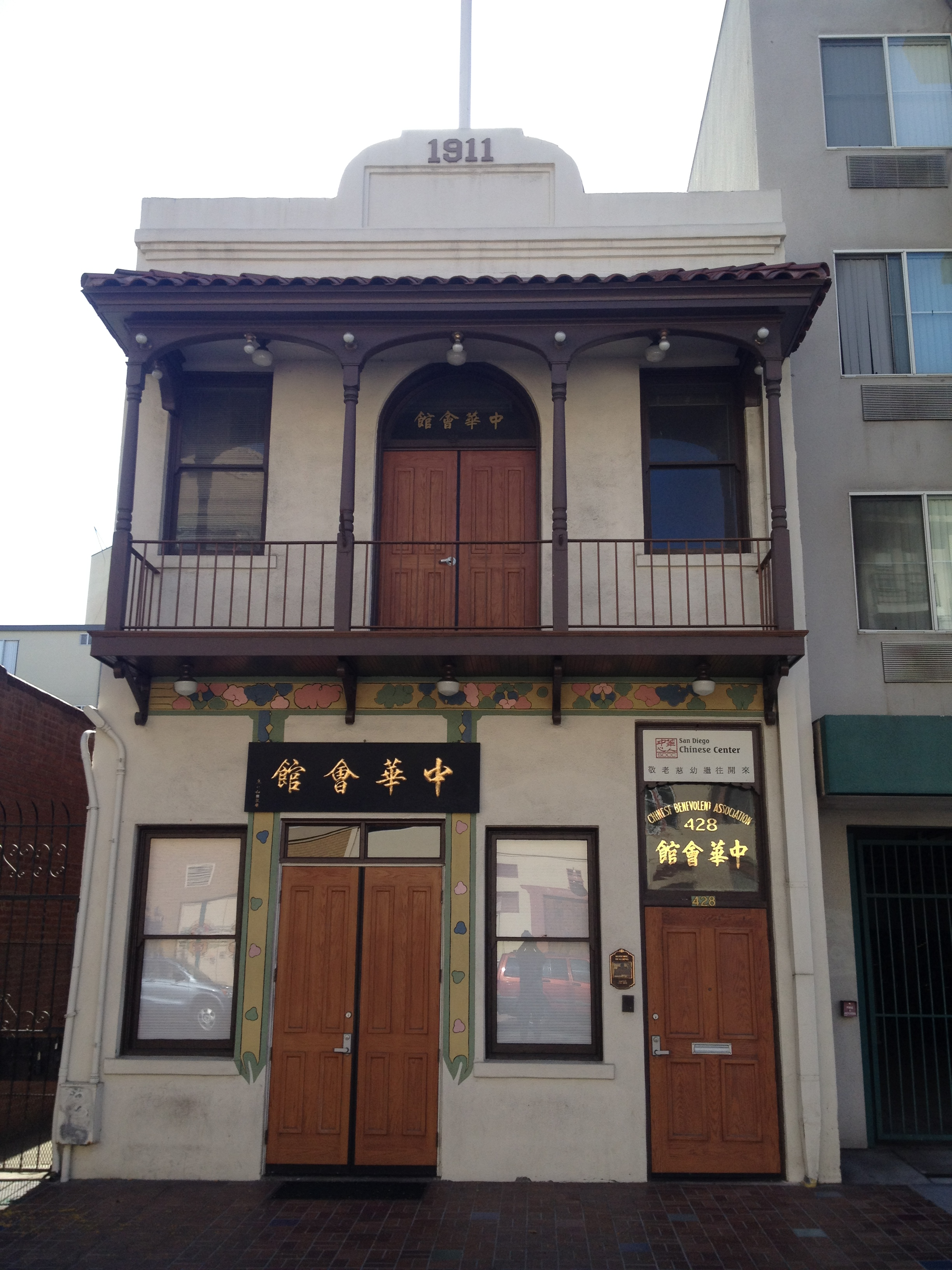
San Diego Chinese Consolidated Benevolent Association

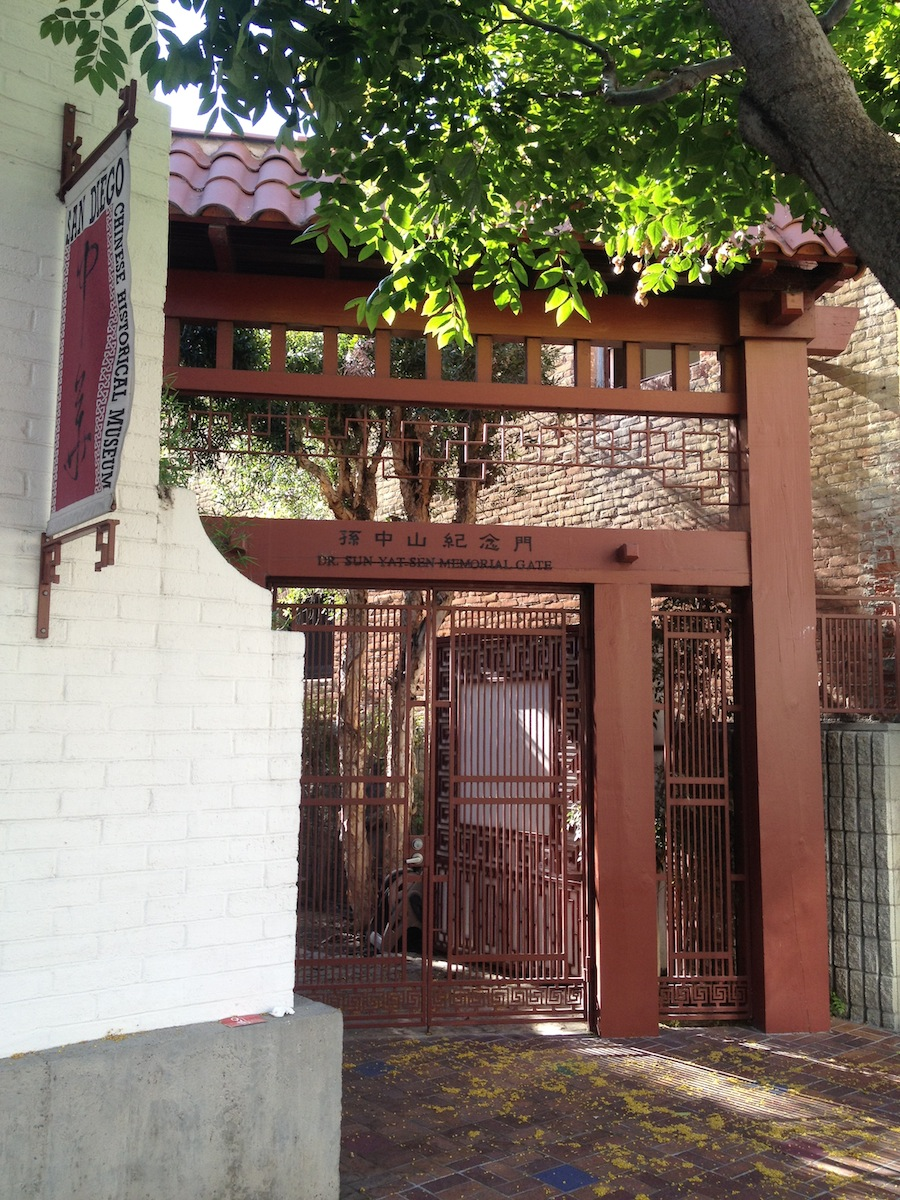
Dr. Sun Yat-Sen Memorial Gate

The Asian Pacific Thematic Historic District (APTHD) is a historic Chinatown in San Diego, California. It is an eight-block district adjacent to and in part overlapping with the Gaslamp Quarter. The district is bounded by Market Street to the north, 2nd Ave. to the west, 6th Ave. to the east and J St. to the south. 22 structures are considered historically contributing.

== History ==
San Diego's Chinatown began in the area in the 1860s, settled by abalone fishermen. The area was once a thriving Chinatown full of Chinese and Chinese-Americans. However, in present day, the area no longer has an especially large Chinese population. After returning from service in World War II, Chinese-Americans moved to other areas of San Diego. The area was finally concluded as a Historic District during the redevelopment of the Gaslamp Quarter in the 1980s and 90s, when eventually dozens of Chinese owned businesses closed and the majority of the Chinese population began to dissipate.

The area was not only home to the Chinese community in San Diego, but was also shared by the Japanese and Filipino communities.

The City of San Diego designated the area a historic district in 1987.

A "makeover" by the Centre City Development Corporation is scheduled for completion in 2012.

== Architecture and Contributing Buildings ==
The 22 contributing structures date from 1883 to 1930. Contribution is based on their relation in the Asian (mostly Chinese) community. Buildings include the San Diego Chinese Historical Museum and the San Diego Chinese Consolidated Benevolent Association.

The San Diego Chinese Historical Museum was built in 1927 elsewhere and was originally the Chinese Mission. It was moved to its present location in 1996. Murray K. Lee, curator of the museum, is as of January 2011 preparing a book about the history of Chinatown.

== See also ==
- Little Saigon, San Diego
- Stingaree, San Diego
- San Diego free speech fight
- Convoy Pan Asian Cultural & Business District
