= Sycamore Canyon Test Facility =

Weapons test site in San Diego, CA

Coordinates: 32°53′48″N 117°3′24″W

Sycamore Canyon Test Facility is a rocket and weapons test site located east of MCAS Miramar in northern San Diego, in Scripps Ranch. A number of weapons contractors have had facilities at the site including Lockheed-Martin, Hughes Aircraft and General Dynamics. The engines for the Atlas missile and Centaur rocket stage were tested at the site. The entire measuring equipment for the test site was built by Baldwin-Lima-Hamilton.
