= South Yemen Cup =

Association football competition

The South Yemen Cup was an association football knock-out cup competition ran and overseen by the Yemen Football Association (YFA). It lasted for one season played in 1984.

== Finals ==
Season	Winner	Score	Runner-up
1984	Al-Wahda (Aden)	3 - 2	Mukalla
