= Sycamore Branch =

Stream in the American state of Missouri

Sycamore Branch is a stream in Bates County in the U.S. state of Missouri. It is a tributary of the Marais des Cygnes River. The stream headwaters arise at 38°08′31″N 94°14′19″W and the stream flows south-southwest until it reaches the floodplain of the Marais des Cygnes at which point it turns to the southeast for about 1.5 kilometers prior to its confluence at 38°04′37″N 94°15′37″W. The source area for the stream is at an elevation of about 875 feet and the confluence is at 738 feet.

The stream crosses under Missouri routes B and N prior to entering the floodplain. Rich Hill lies five miles to the west on Route B. Mission Branch joins the stream within the floodplain of the Marais des Cygnes River.

Sycamore Branch was named for the sycamore trees lining its banks.

== See also ==
- List of rivers of Missouri
