= Edward Sycamore =

British sailing skipper

Edward Isaac Sycamore
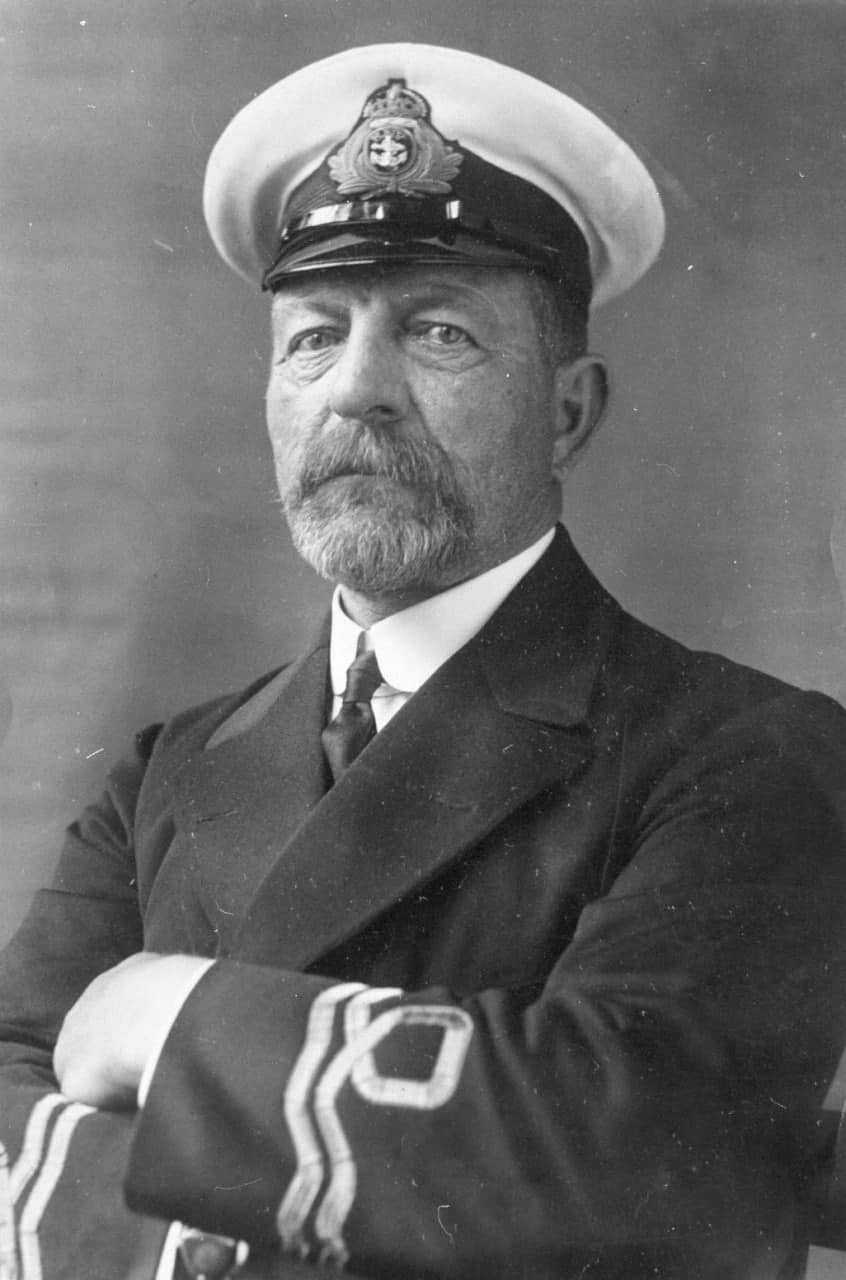
- Lieutenant E I Sycamore RNVR in 1917
- Born: 24 August 1855; Duke Street, Chelmsford, England
- Died: 9 April 1930 (aged 74); Brightlingsea, England
- Other name: Captain Sycamore
- Occupation: Sailing skipper
- Spouse: Elizabeth Rosetta Paine (m. 1881)
- Parent(s): John Sycamore and Eliza Moss

Edward Isaac Sycamore (1855–1930) was a British sailing skipper widely regarded as the leading British yacht skipper of his generation during 1890 to 1929. He was often referred to as Syc and later Old Syc.

== Early life ==
Sycamore was born in on 24 August 1855 at Duke Street, Chelmsford, the first son of John Sycamore and Eliza Moss. John was a maltster and came from East Doneyland (Rowhedge) on the river Colne. Eliza's family were farmers from St Lawrence on the south bank of the Blackwater.

When Sycamore was twelve he joined the crew of a fishing boat. After several seasons fishing, he moved to yachting in 1875, working initially for the Marquis of Ailsa aboard the Lady Evelyn. Her voyages included trips to the West Indies and Mediterranean. In 1879 he went to work for H Atkins of Warrenpoint in the 20 ton cutter Louise. His first command was the Amberwitch in 1884. Following early successes in the Babe, he rose rapidly to the top of his profession, and remained there until his death on 9 April 1930.

He married Elizabeth Rosetta Paine, daughter of a licensed victualler, on 2 November 1881. The family moved to Brightlingsea in 1884 living at 34 Nelson Street and then from 1913 White Lodge.

== Yachts commanded ==
Date	Yacht	Owner	Notes	References
1884	Amberwitch	Captain Douglas	56 ton yawl	
1886	Amelia	W A Beauclerk	former fishing smack	
1887-89	Heathen Chinee	W A Beauclerk	junk rigged	
1890-91	Babe	W A Beauclerk	2½ Rater	
1892	Corsair	Admiral Montagu	40 Rater	
1893	Vendetta	Admiral Montagu	40 Rater	
1894	Carina	Admiral Montagu	40 Rater	
1895	Valkyrie III	Earl of Dunraven	America's Cup	
1897-98	Bona	Duke of Abruzzi		
1899	Laurea	Edward Hore	won Coupe de France	
1900	Sybarita	Whitaker Wright	with Captain Bevis	
1901	Shamrock II	Sir Thomas Lipton	America's Cup	
1902	Namara	William B Paget		
1903-07	Navahoe	George Watjen		
1908-10	Shamrock	Sir Thomas Lipton	23 metre	
1911	Mariquita	A K Stothert	19 metre	
1912	Shamrock	Sir Thomas Lipton	23 metre	
1914	Isabella Alexandra	Edmund Luttrop	15 metre	
1920-24	Westward	Clarence Hatry	schooner	
1923-24	Paula III	Sir Walter Preston	15 metre	
1925-29	Shamrock	Sir Thomas Lipton	23 metre	

== Racing successes ==
In 1911 The Yachtsman produced a table showing Sycamore's successes. In 548 races he won 372 prizes, a success rate of 67.8% or a prize in every 1.47 starts.

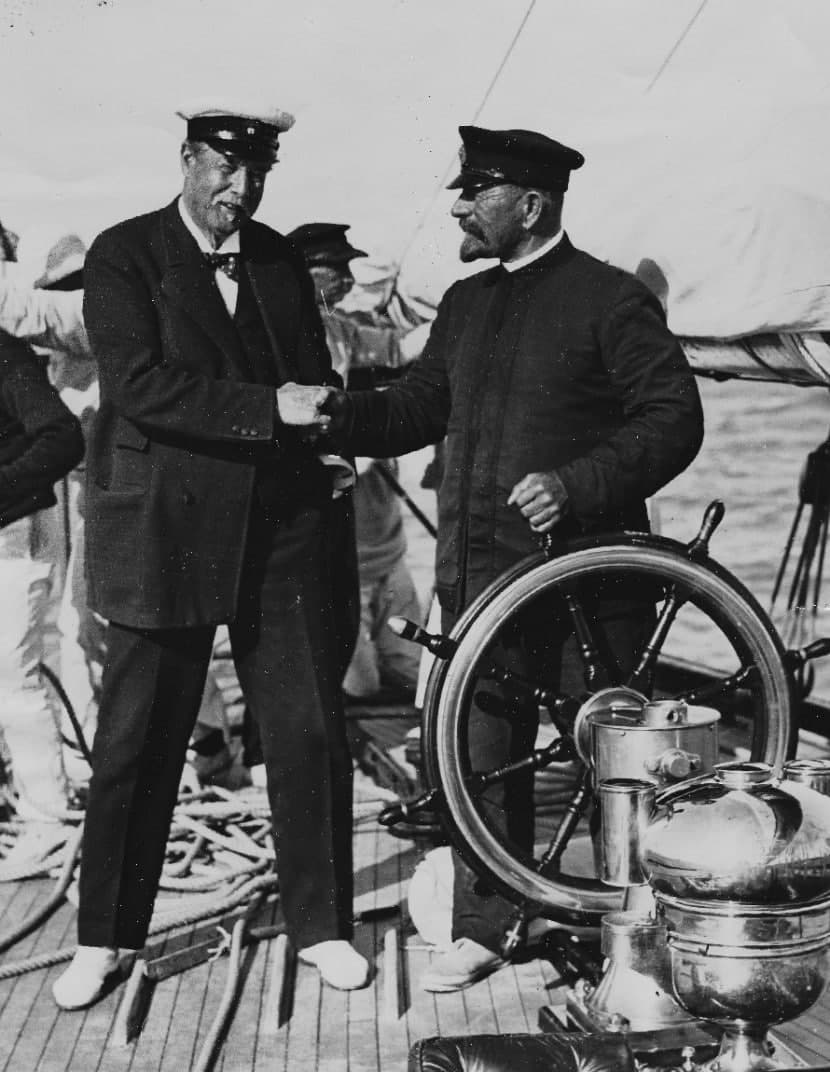
Sir Thomas Lipton with Capt Sycamore

Year	Boat	Races	Prizes
1890	The Babe	30	25
1891	The Babe	45	39
1892	Corsair	42	22
1893	Vendetta	33	18
1894	Carina	47	23
1895	Valkyrie III	-	-
1896	Valkyrie III	-	-
1897	Bona	24	18
1898	Bona	52	39
1899	Laurea	9	9
1900	Sybarita	-	-
1901	Shamrock II	-	-
1902	Namara	30	18
1903	Navahoe	20	13
1904	Navahoe	18	13
1905	Navahoe	18	17
1906	Navahoe	14	12
1907	Navahoe	18	17
1908	Shamrock	35	31
1909	Shamrock	41	20
1910	Shamrock	28	19
1911	Mariquita	44	19

Sycamore's wins included six Royal Cups (one in Corsair and one in Carina for Admiral the Hon Victor Montagu; three in Bona in one year for the Duke of Abruzzi; one for Sir Thomas Lipton in Shamrock) and two Albert Cups, both in Bona.

== War service ==
At the outbreak of the First World War Isabella Alexandra and the Kaiser's yacht Meteor were being towed to Cowes by a torpedo boat. When war was declared they returned to Cuxhaven where the crew of Isabella Alexandra was interned. They were released after about a week and returned to the UK via Denmark.

Sycamore joined the Royal Navy as a Lieutenant RNVR in May 1917, aged nearly 62, and was appointed in command of ML 350 operating from the RNAS seaplane base at Newlyn. In September 1917 he was appointed in command of ML 5 based at Calshot. He remained in command of her, initially at Calshot and later Dundee, until he was demobbed on 15 September 1919. With the formation of the RAF on 1 April 1918 he became a Captain RAF. He is thought to have been the oldest person to have been commissioned into the Royal Navy and immediately given a command. It is also thought he may have been the oldest officer in the RAF when he left.

== Death ==
Sycamore had been suffering from the accidental breaking of multiple ribs as he had been racing Sir Thomas Lipton's Shamrock on the Clyde during 1929. On 9 April 1930, he died at his home in Brightlingsea, at the age of 74.

== Bibliography ==
- The Field 1875
- Lloyds Yacht Register 1878
- Yachting Volumes 1 and 2. Badminton Library 1894
- Yachting World Selected editions from 1895
- Leslie's. United States, F. Leslie, 1895.
- Report of the Special Committee of the New York Yacht Club New York 1896
- The House on Sport Ed W A Morgan. Gale and Polden 1898
- Collier's. United States, Collier's, 1901.
- World Review. United States, World Review Company, 1901.
- Lawson History of the America's Cup W M Thompson and T W Lawson. Boston 1902
- Herd register. N.p., n.p, 1903.
- Adventure. United States, Ridgway, 1914.
- The Sphere: An Illustrated Newspaper for the Home. United Kingdom, n.p, 1922.
- The West Virginia Review. United States, Zurich Publishing Company, 1929.
- Yachting Monthly from 1906 to 1930
- The Reminiscences of Admiral Montagu The Hon V A Montagu. Edward Arnold 1910
- The Complete Yachtsman B Heckstall-Smith and Capt E du Boulay. Methuen 1912
- All Hands on the Main Sheet Brooke Heckstall-Smith. Grant Richards 1921
- Past Times and Pastimes Earl of Dunraven. Hodder and Stoughton 1922
- The Rudder. United States, Fawcett Publications, 1926.
- Famous Yachts John Scott Hughes. Methuen 1929
- Log of the Shamrock 1929 W Wadley
- Leaves from the Lipton Logs Sir Thomas Lipton. Hutchinson 1931
- Countryside Character. United Kingdom, Blandford Press, 1946.
- The King's Sailing Master Douglas Dixon. Harrap 1948
- Julyan, Herbert E.. Sixty Years of Yachts. United Kingdom, Hutchinson, 1950.
- Sacred Cowes Anthony Heckstall-Smith. Allan Wingate 1955
- Brooks, Jerome Edmund. The $30,000,000 Cup: The Stormy History of the Defense of the America's Cup. United States, Simon and Schuster, 1958.
- A Hundred Years of the America's Cup F W Lipscomb. Hugh Evelyn 1971
- The Northseamen John Leather. Terence Dalton 1971
- The Racing Schooner Westward C P Hamilton-Adams. Stanford Maritime 1976
- Salt-Water Palaces Maldwyn Drummond. Debrett 1979
- The Racing Yachts A B C Whipple. Time Life Books 1980
- The Early Challenges of the America's Cup. A John and I Dear. Columbus 1986
- The Story of the America's Cup 1851-1992. Tim Thompson, Ranulf Rayner. David& Charles c1993
- Yachting - a Turn of the Century Treasury. Ed Tony Meisel. Castle 1988
- The Man Who Invented Himself James Mackay. Mainstream 1998
- An America's Cup Treasury Gary Jobson. The Mariners Museum 1999
- A Full Cup Michael d'Antonio. Riverhead Books 2010
- G L Watson Martin Black. Peggy Bawn Press 2011
- Valkyrie Weather Daniel Simons. Printed privately 2012
- Temple to the Wind Christopher Pastore. Lyons Press 2013
- Deer Isle's Undefeated America's Cup crews. M J Gabrielson. The History Press 2013
- Rowe, Mark. 5327: England in Peace and War. United Kingdom, Chaplin Books, 2013.
- Dublin Bay – The Cradle of Yacht Racing Hal Sisk. 2nd ed. Peggy Bawn Press 2014
- Porter, Ken. Clacton-on-Sea and the Surrounding Coastline in the Great War. N.p., Pen & Sword Books, 2017.
