= City Heights, San Diego =

- Community of San Diego
- City Heights
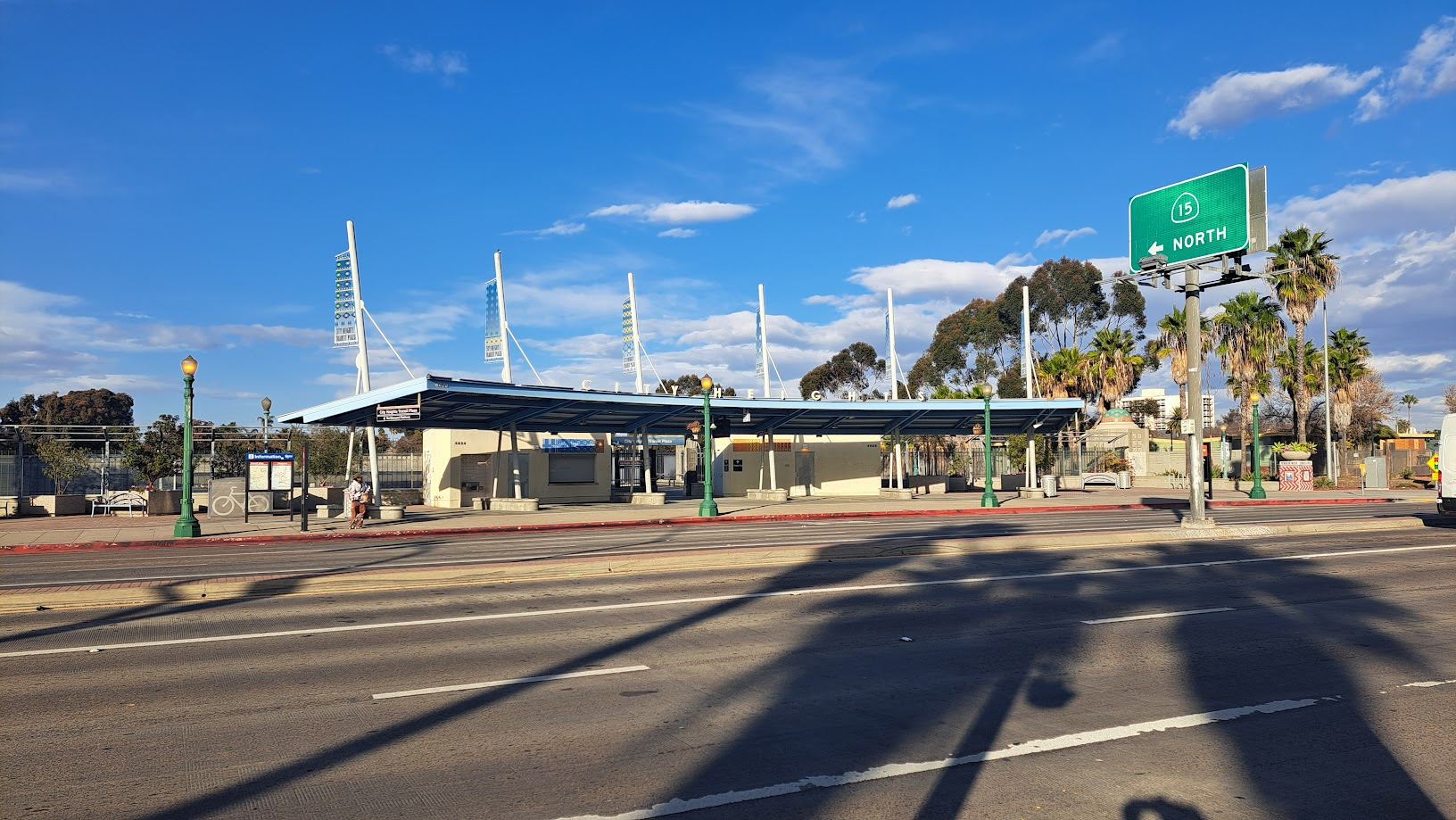

- Location within Central San Diego#California#USA
- Coordinates: 32.74°N 117.10°W
- Country: United States of America
- State: California
- County: San Diego
- City: San Diego

Population (2015)
  - Total: 74,843

City Heights is a dense urban community in central San Diego, California, known for its ethnic diversity. The area was previously known as East San Diego. City Heights is located south of Mission Valley and northeast of Balboa Park.

City Heights is notable as a home to refugees and immigrants, with significant communities of Vietnamese, Somali, Cambodian, Laotian, and Latino residents. Many social and cultural resources, retail stores, and restaurants are operated by and/or serve the non-white population.

City Heights is densely populated and has mostly multi-family apartments and homes.

== History ==
When Mexico gained independence from Spain in 1821, it claimed the land and secularized the mission system, distributing the lands to rancheros. When the United States annexed the land, the modern era of American settler colonialism began. Settlement and any later development was facilitated by the forced removal of Kumeyaay people to reservations begun by President Ulysses S. Grant in 1875.

=== American settlement ===
In the 1880s, American entrepreneurs Abraham Klauber and Samuel Steiner purchased over 240 acres (0.97 km^{2}) of unincorporated land northeast of Balboa Park, hoping to profit from the area. Together they named it "City Heights," though it was also known as the "Steiner, Klauber, Choate and Castle Addition" after the earlier developers of the property. The area was subdivided, and on November 2, 1912, eligible area voters voted to become an incorporated city known as East San Diego. Population boomed in the next few years from 400 in 1910 to 4,000 during the incorporation.

On December 31, 1923, the City of East San Diego voted, 1,344 to 1,109, for annexation into the City of San Diego, becoming once again a neighborhood known as City Heights. The East San Diego trustees did not immediately recognize the annexation in early 1924. Complete annexation occurred over the next few years with the City of San Diego taking over.

=== Emergence as an urban center ===
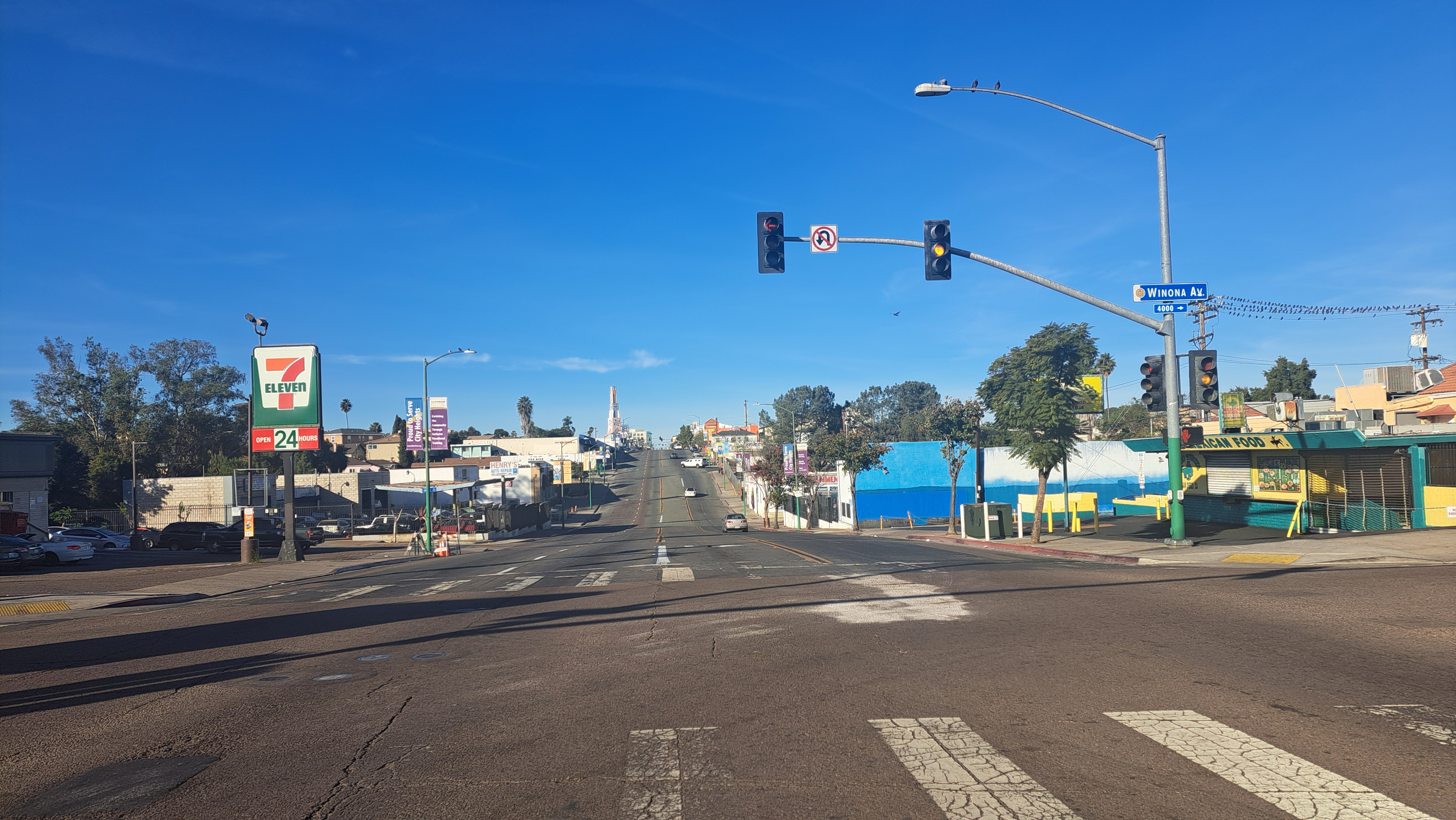
University and Winona Avenue

During most of the 1930s, 1940s, and the 1950s the area had some suburban housing and was a commercial center for middle-class white residents, while people of color were segregated in south and east San Diego through discriminatory housing practices.

In the late 1950s, Caltrans planned the I-15 freeway to cut directly through the area, accelerating white flight and disinvestment. The development of Fashion Valley, Mission Valley and the College Grove Shopping Center siphoned off middle-class customers from the University Avenue and El Cajon Boulevard corridor.

==== Refugee & immigrant population influx ====
Following the Vietnam War, many refugees from Southeast Asia arrived to the United States at Camp Pendleton, near San Diego. Many Vietnamese, Cambodian, and Thai refugees settled in City Heights during the 1970s and 80s, due to the cheap rents resulting from disinvestment. From the 1980s to the 1990s, resettlement agencies directed many refugees from the Somali Civil War to City Heights.

During the late 20th century, the area had a high concentration of low-income residents, most of whom were renters and 30% of whom lived below the poverty line. In the anti-welfare and increasingly anti-immigrant climate of the 1990s, exemplified by the passage of Proposition 187 in 1994, public services, healthcare, and welfare became even less accessible. City Heights churches often provided key services and continue to act as community centers.

By the 1990s, the area was described in the local media as one of the "urban edges where the inner city bleeds into the suburbs" and was widely portrayed as a crime hotspot. Drawing on American racism, Somali and African American youth were frequently portrayed, often through "culture of poverty" scripts, as primarily responsible for the crime and poverty in City Heights. Officials believed police intervention was the only measure available to address the deteriorating conditions. Anti-gang programs implemented by police and city leaders targeted and often arrested Somali men for loitering in public or hanging out near businesses.

==== Price Charities redevelopment & outcomes ====
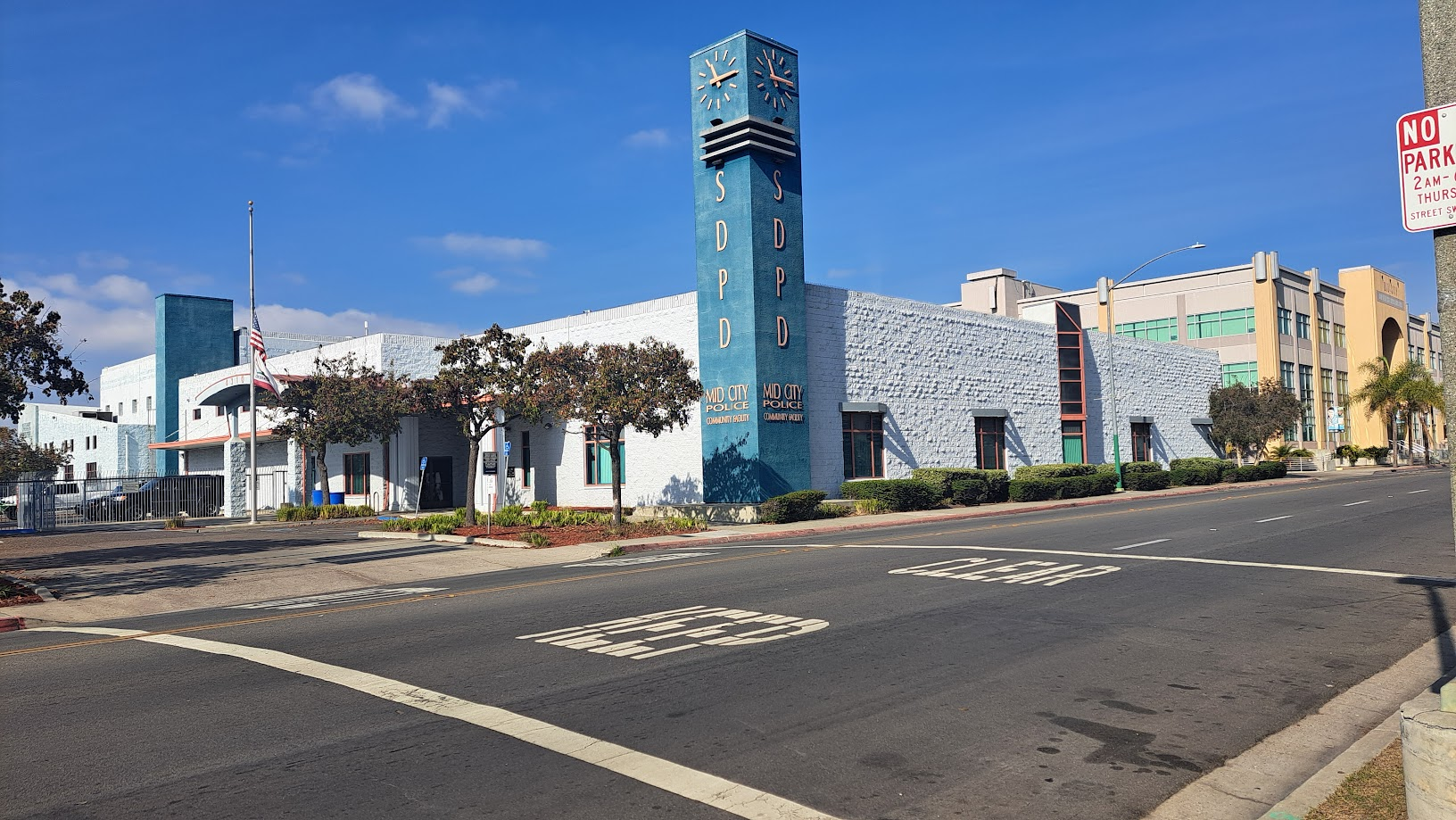
San Diego Police Department Mid-City Substation

In the mid-1990s, businessman and philanthropist Sol Price led and financed a redevelopment plan to create a multi-block "urban village," of which a new San Diego Police substation was to be the cornerstone. An economic development non-profit (Mid-City Development Corp.) and area homeowners had proposed building the new substation in 1993, however, the city was unable or unwilling to put up the $3 million needed to build the station. With Price's funding, the station opened in 1996.

By 2000, Price had spent $70 million on the redevelopment of City Heights through his "urban village" model. This redevelopment format, which evolved from the Mid-City Communities Plan, became officially codified into the "City of Villages" plan adopted by the City of San Diego in the 2002 General Plan, which continues to guide the city's urban policy.

The late 1990s and early 2000s saw redevelopment in City Heights continue, as new public facilities — including schools, a library, and a community center — opened around the newly developed center, through public-private partnerships. The additional public services and new commercial center were well received by residents. The Price-backed housing developments have received criticism for mainly serving moderate-income people, however, and the general sense of experimentation led some to dub the area "Guinea Pig Heights."

Since the 1990s, the demographics of the neighborhood have been changing. More middle- and upper-class Hispanic and Asian residents have moved to City Heights, while the number of Black residents, particularly those who are low-income, has decreased sharply. Rents and property prices have increased, sometimes by double or triple. The area has still been considered cheaper than other central San Diego areas which have undergone or are undergoing gentrification. It remains home to many refugees and immigrants from Latin America, Africa, Southeast Asia, Western Asia and North Africa.

According to 2017 reports, City Heights has lower rates of violent crime and property crime than nearby North Park and Hillcrest, as well as Downtown Gaslamp, and East Village.

San Diego Magazine named City Heights as one of the best places to live in San Diego in 2015. That year, the San Diego Indiefest music festival took place in City Heights' Urban Village.

By 2019, the area had been designated as an "Economic Opportunity Zone," which qualifies investors for tax breaks and other forms of corporate welfare, a policy which may accelerate the displacement of low-income residents. Gentrification in North Park has been trickling up University Avenue towards City Heights, with new events and businesses drawing higher-income residents, many of whom are middle- and upper-class Hispanic professionals, to the area.

== Geography ==
City Heights is large and diffuse, with many sub-neighborhoods. The community is divided into two pieces by Fairmount Avenue: City Heights East and City Heights West. The community is bounded by Interstate 805 to the west, El Cajon Boulevard to the north, 54th Street to the east, and Home Avenue/Euclid Avenue/Chollas Parkway to the southeast.

"Downtown" City Heights is generally regarded to be in the Teralta West neighborhood, and along University Avenue.

The community is further divided into fourteen neighborhoods: Azalea-Hollywood Park, Castle, Cherokee Point, Chollas Creek, Colina Del Sol, Corridor, Fairmount Park, Fairmount Village, Fox Canyon, Islenair (a city-designated historic district), Teralta East, Teralta West, Swan Canyon, and Ridgeview-Webster.

== Demographics ==
City Heights had an estimated population of 65,552 as of 2020, according to SANDAG. City Heights is majority Hispanic and low-income, with high rates of poverty, unemployment, child obesity, and asthma.

City Heights is home to significant Vietnamese, Somali, Cambodian, and Laotian communities.

Population of City Heights by Race/Ethnicity
	Non-Hispanic/				
Hispanic	White	Black	American Indian	Asian & Pacific Islander	All Other
43,622	10,084	7,701	204	11,413	1,819

70% of households make less than $44,999, with median household income at $29,710 as of 2015, adjusted for inflation.

The median age is approximately 30 years old. Most housing in City Heights is multi-family.

Household Income in City Heights ($2010, adjusted for inflation)
Less than $15,000	$15k-$29,999	$30k-$44,999	$45k-$59,000	$60k-$74,000	$75k-$99,999	$100k-$124,999	$125k-$149,999	$150k+
25%	26%	19%	13%	8%	6%	2%	1%	0%

== Significant Places ==
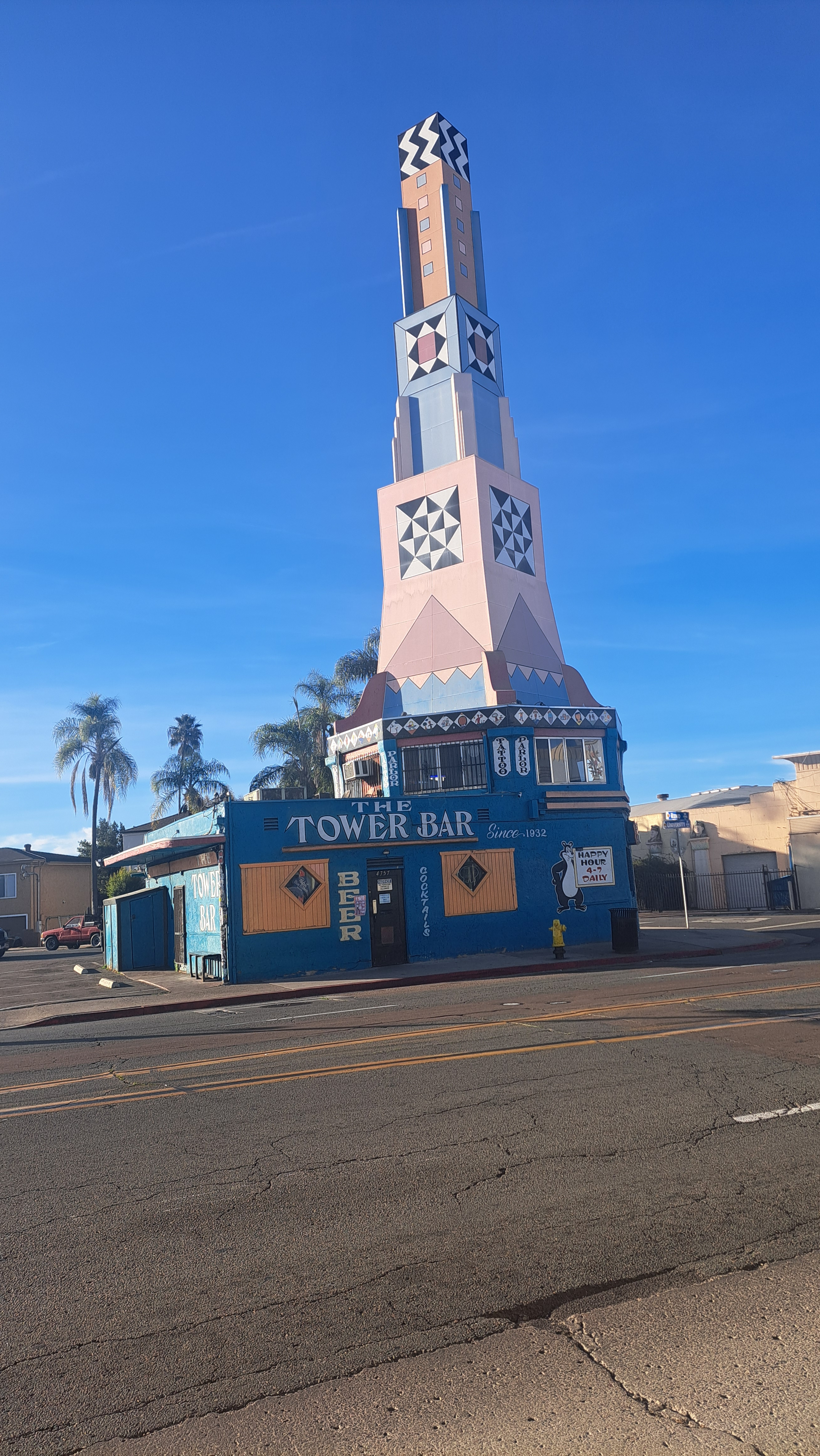
The Tower Bar

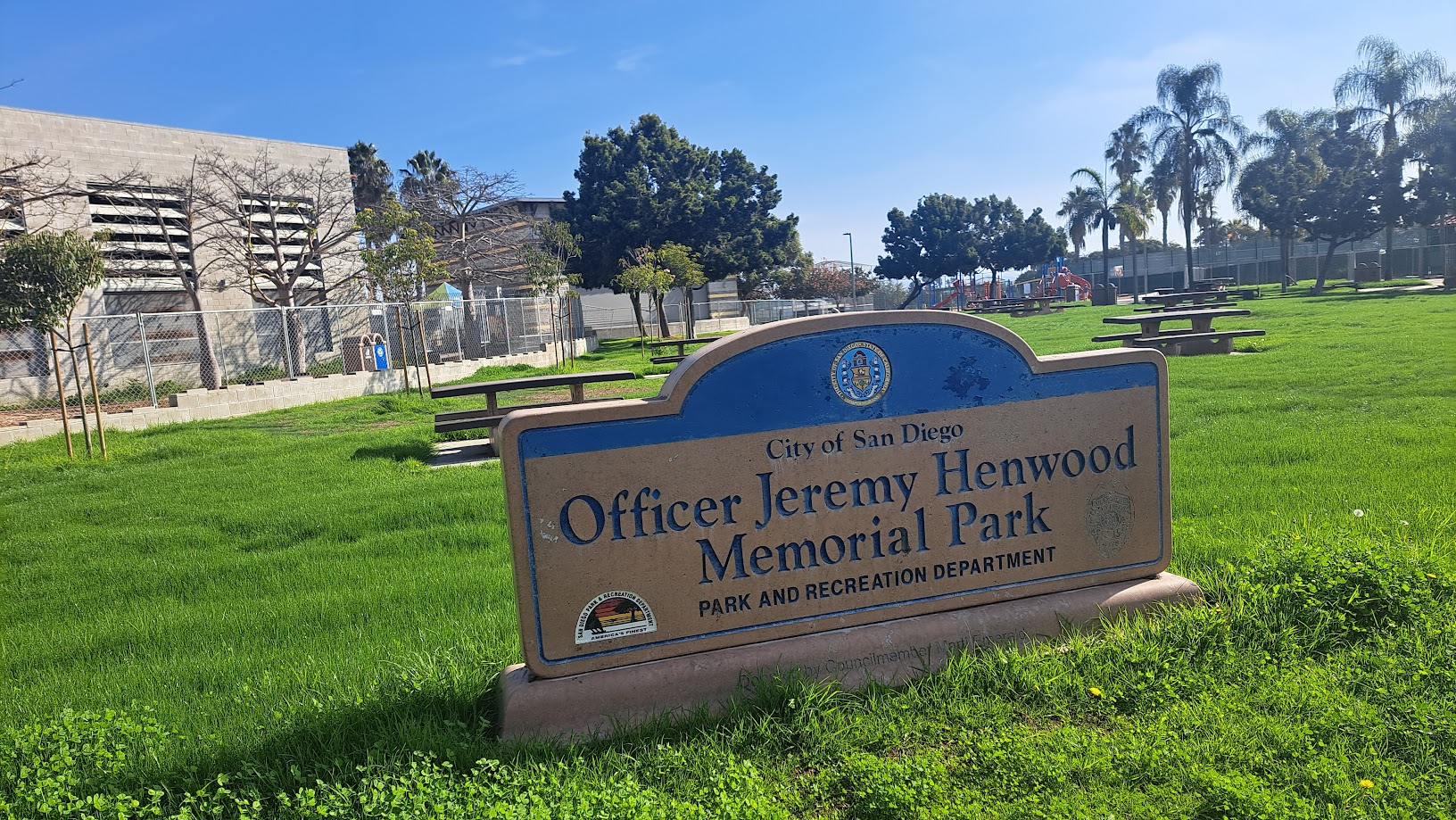
Officer Jeremy Henwood Memorial Park, 4455 Wightman St

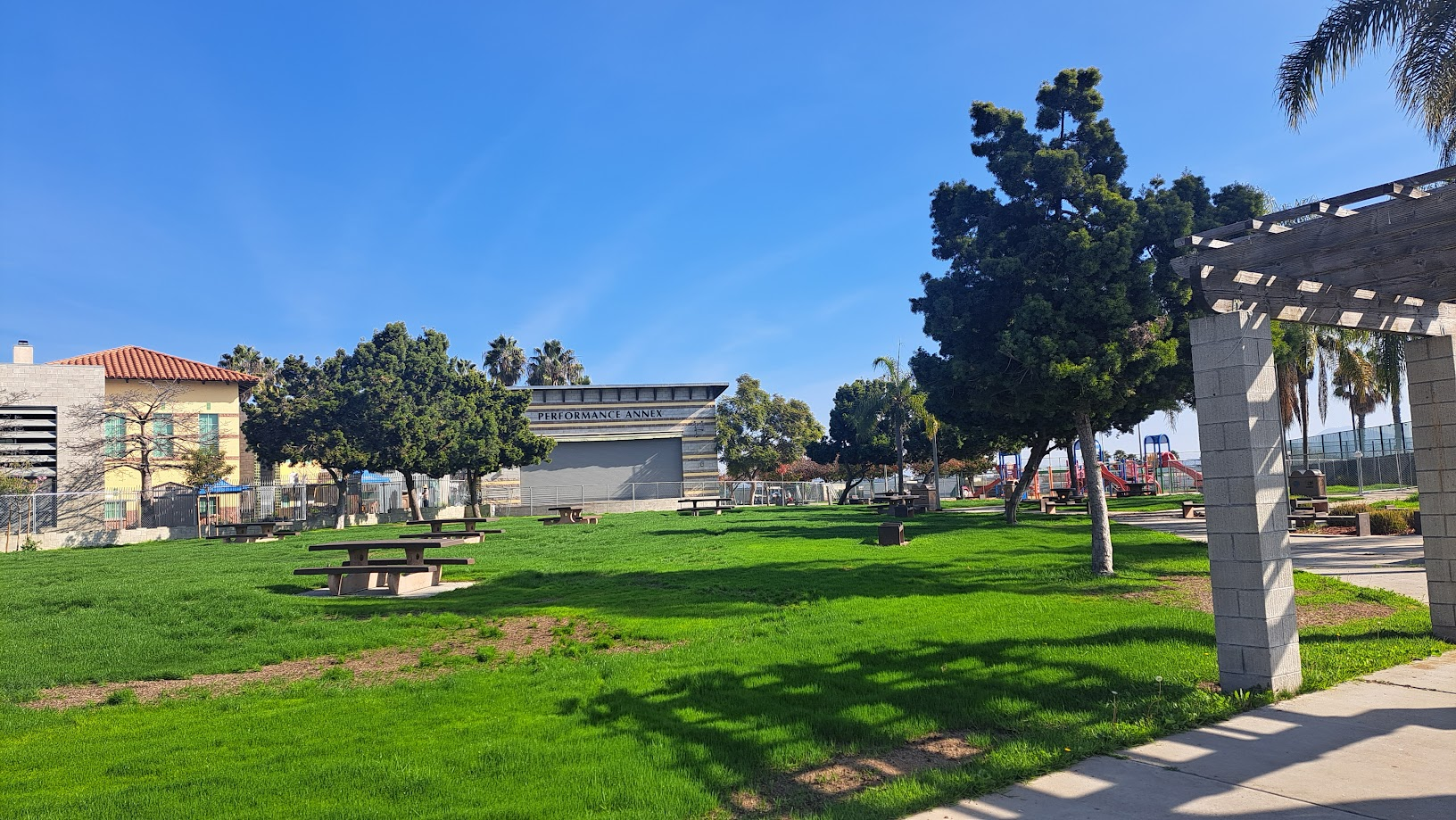
City Heights Performance Annex, 3795 Fairmount Ave

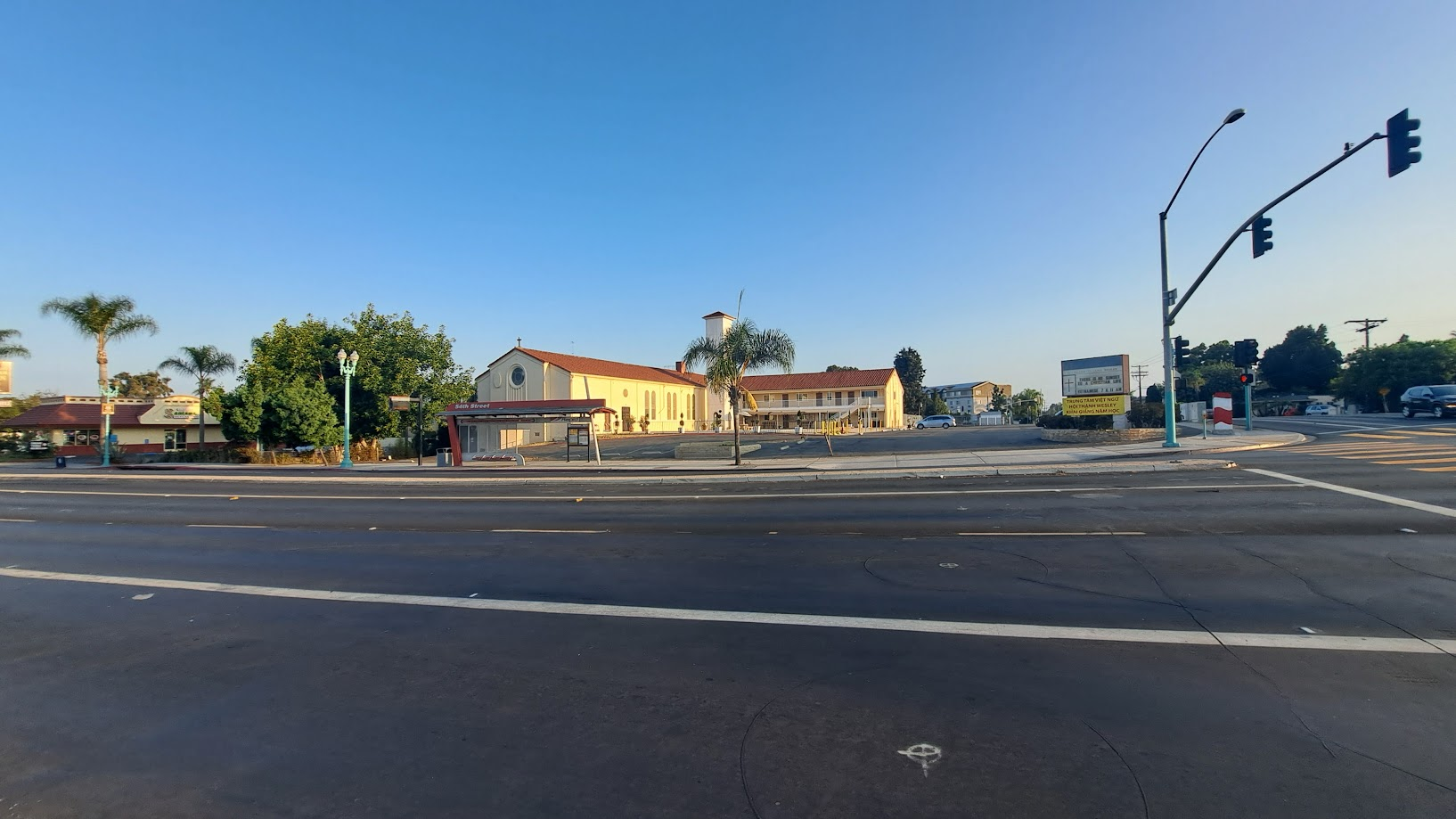
Wesleyan United Methodist Church, 5380 El Cajon Blvd

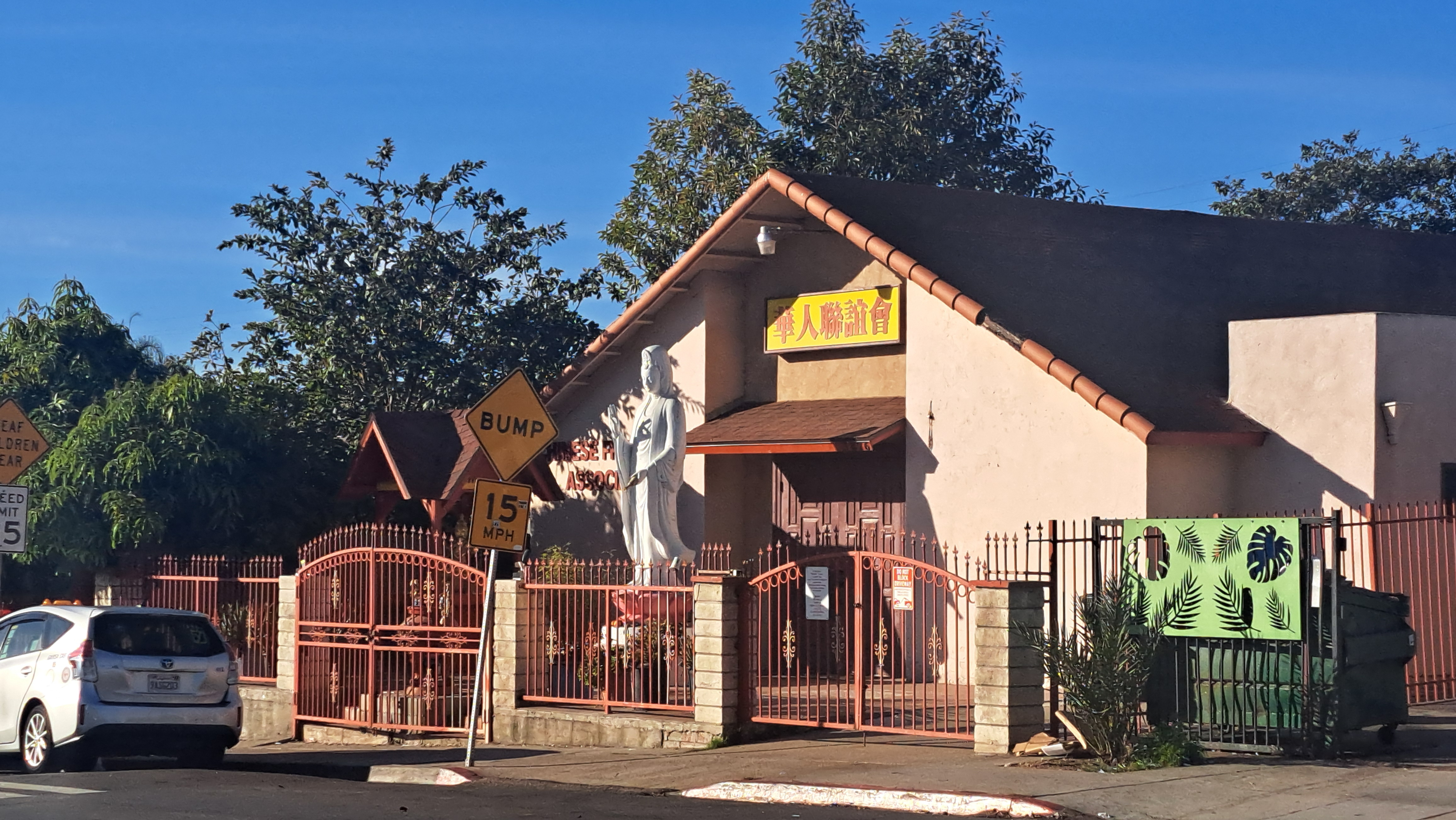
Chinese Friendship Association, Buddhist Temple, 3876 50th St

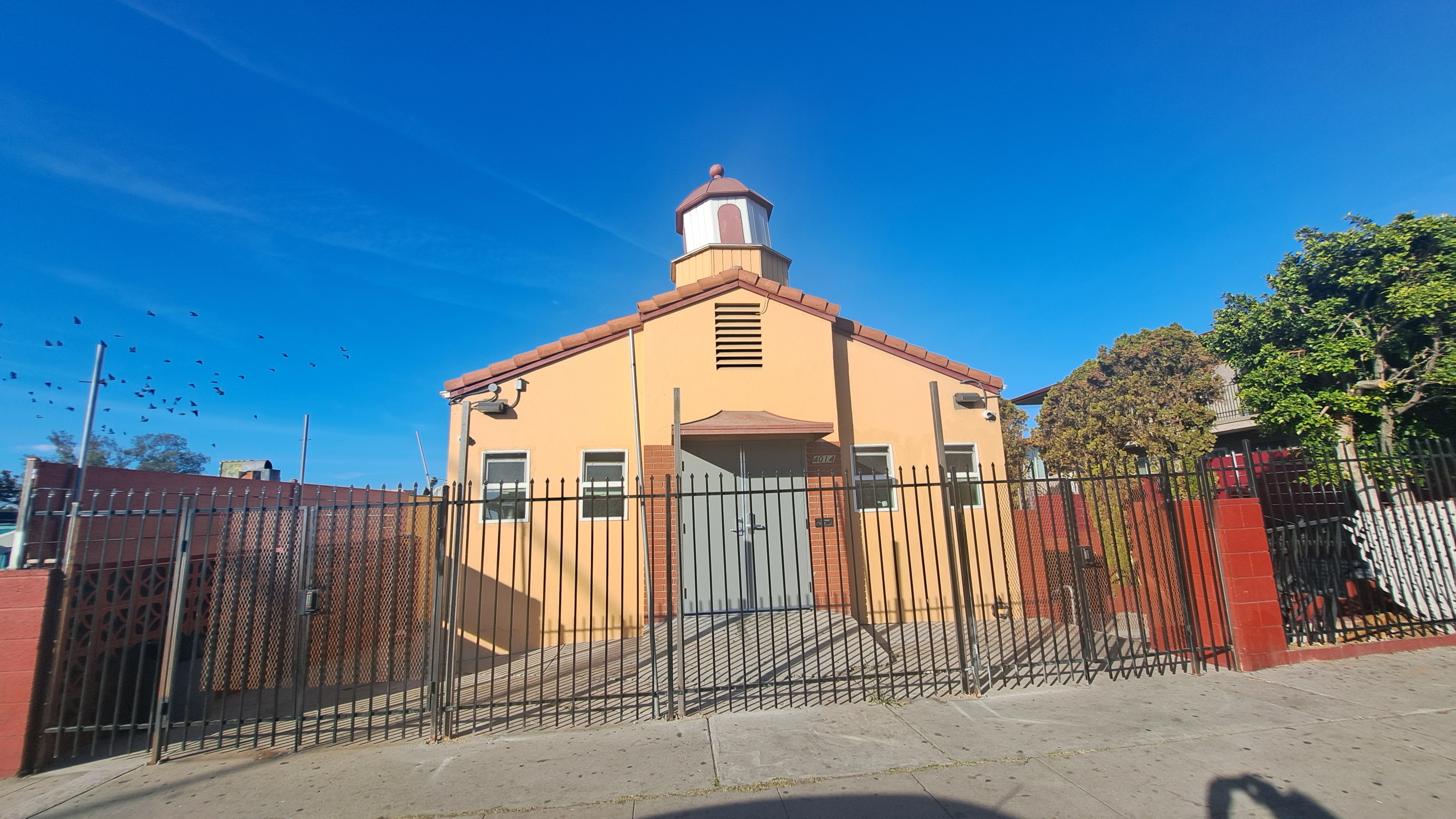
Masjid Al-Ansar Mosque, 4014 Winona Ave

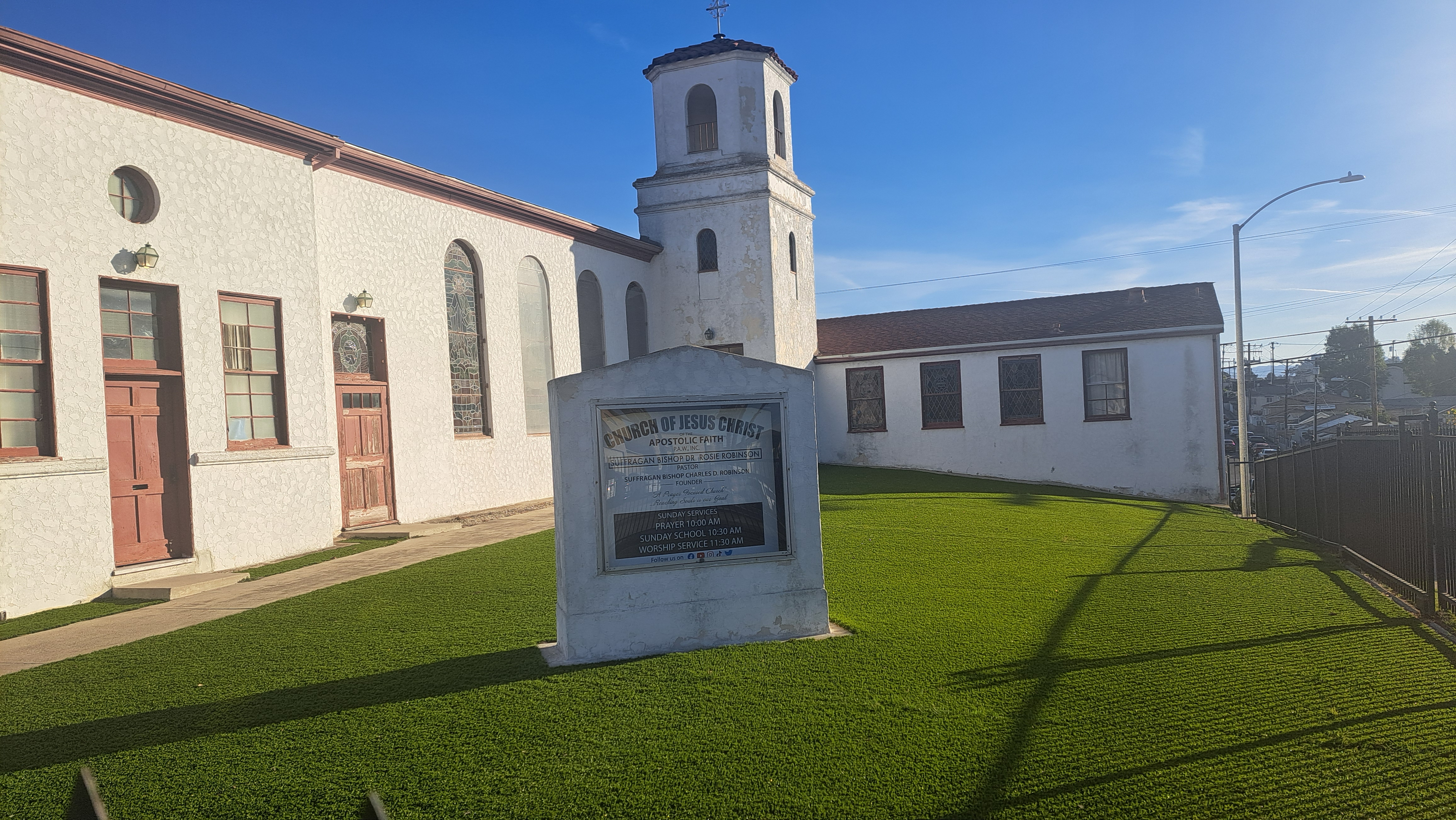
Church of Jesus Christ, Apostolic, 4101 48th St

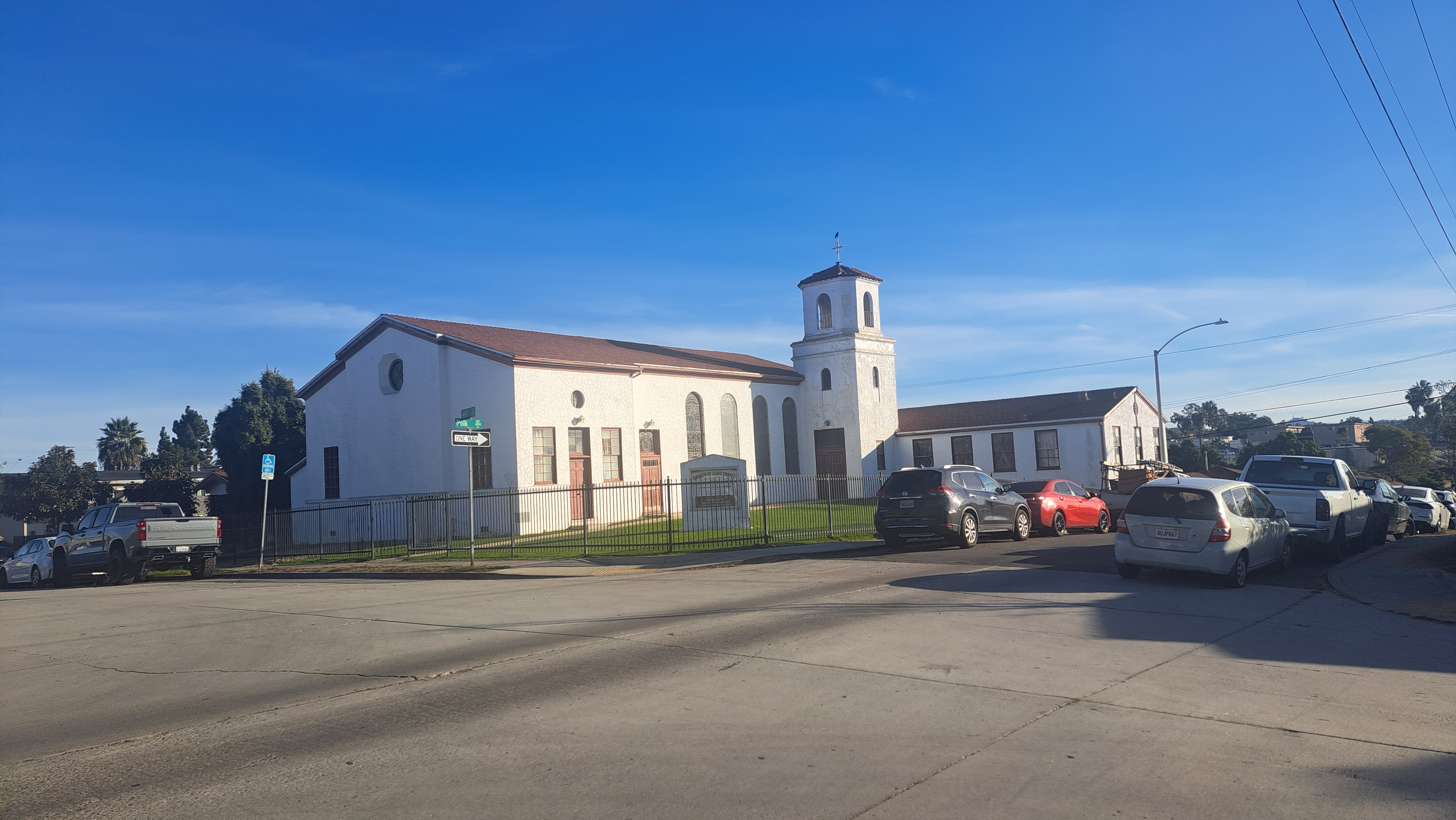
Church of Jesus Christ, Apostolic

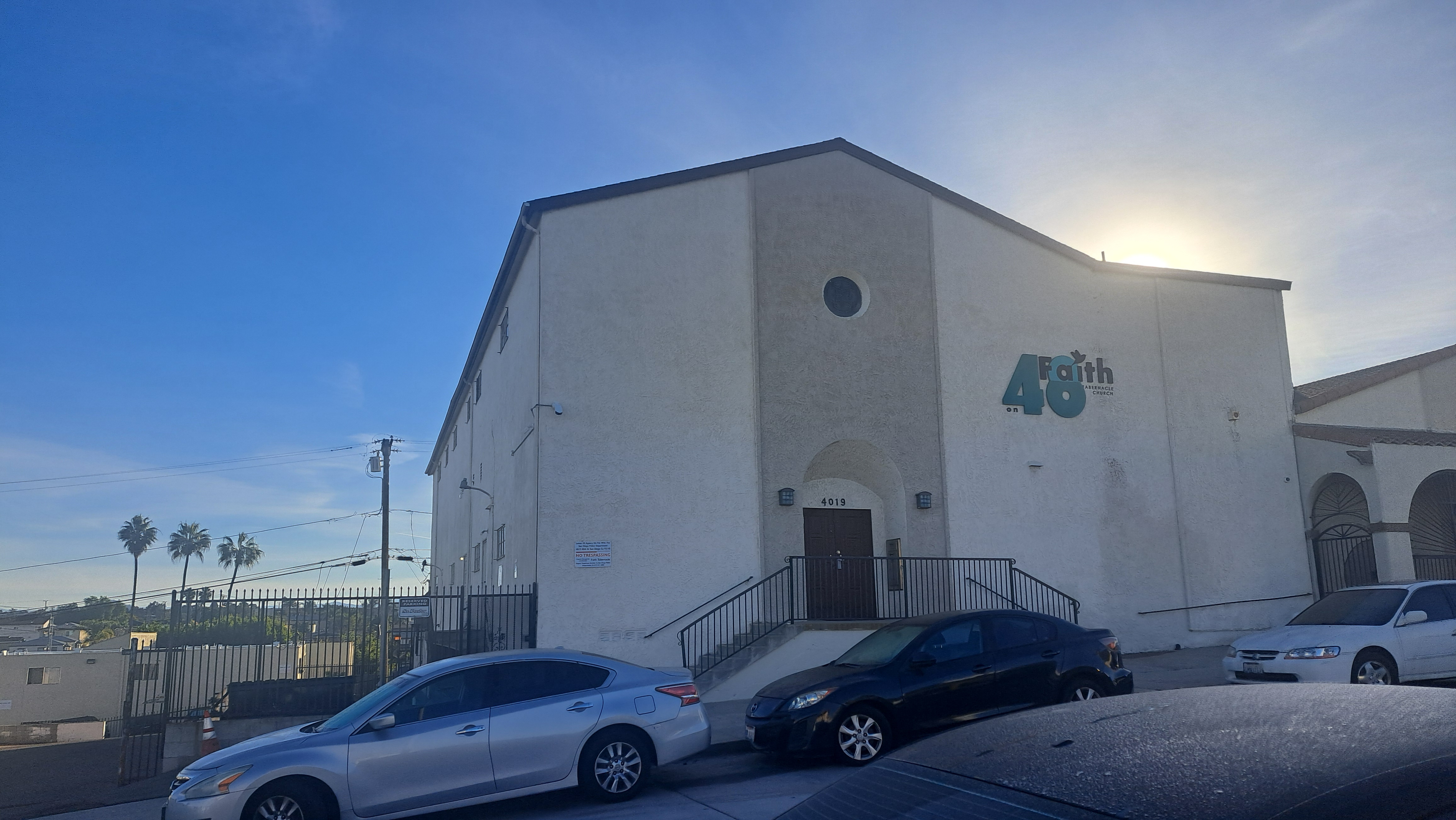
Faith Tabernacle and Nuevo Remanente, 4019 48th St

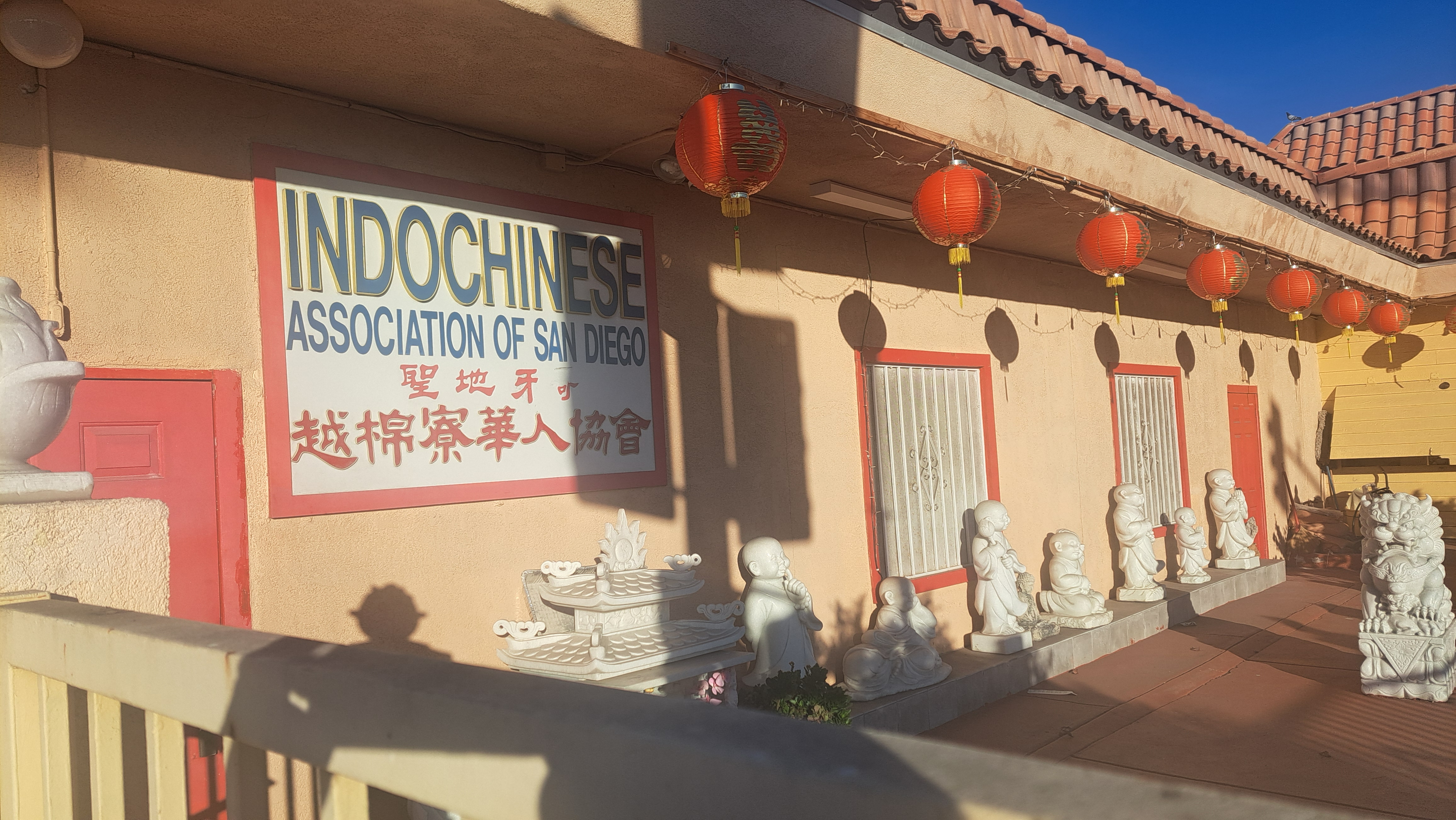
Thien Hau Temple Chùa Bà Thiên Hậu (Buddhist), 4538 University Ave

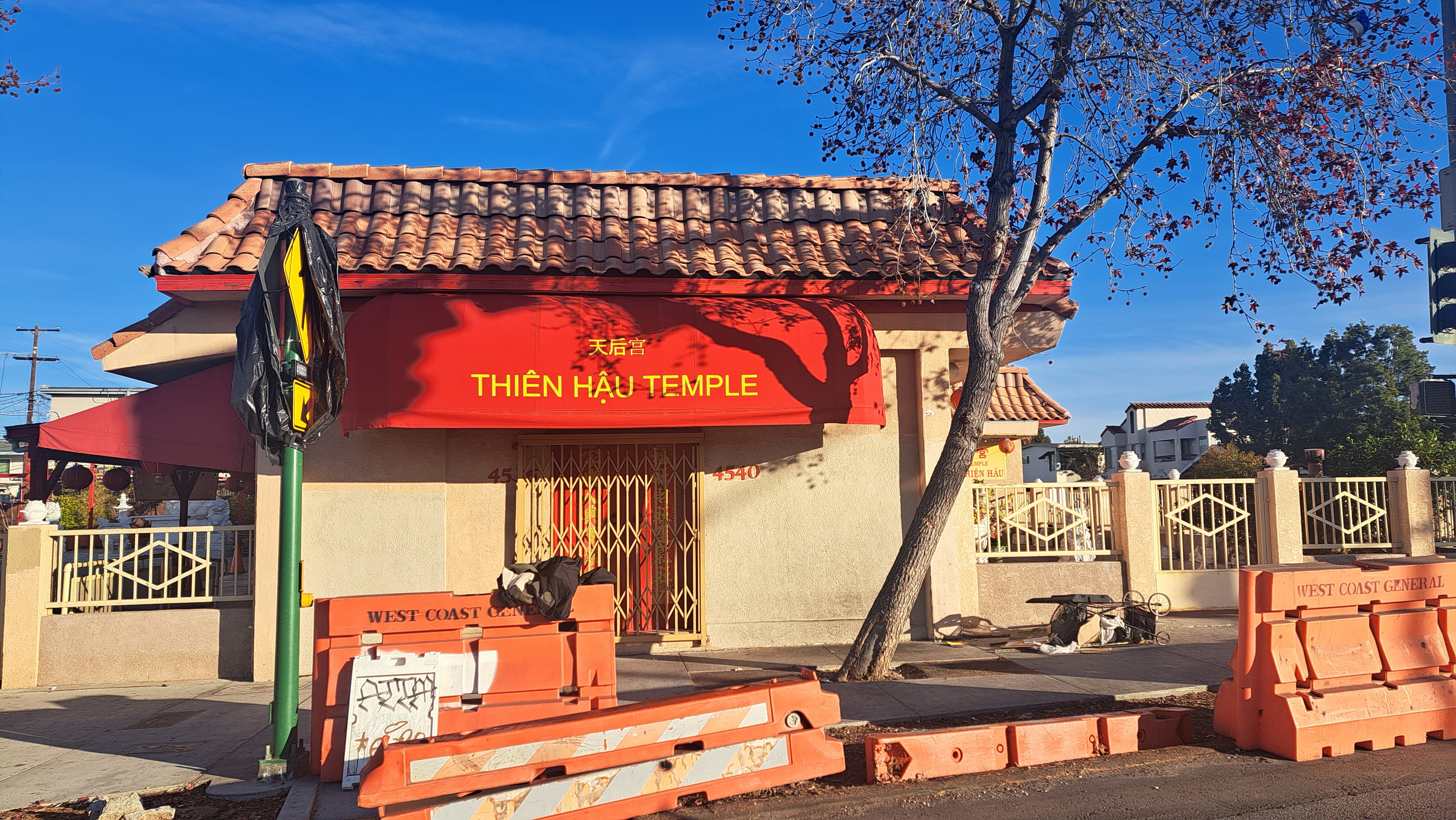
Thien Hau Temple

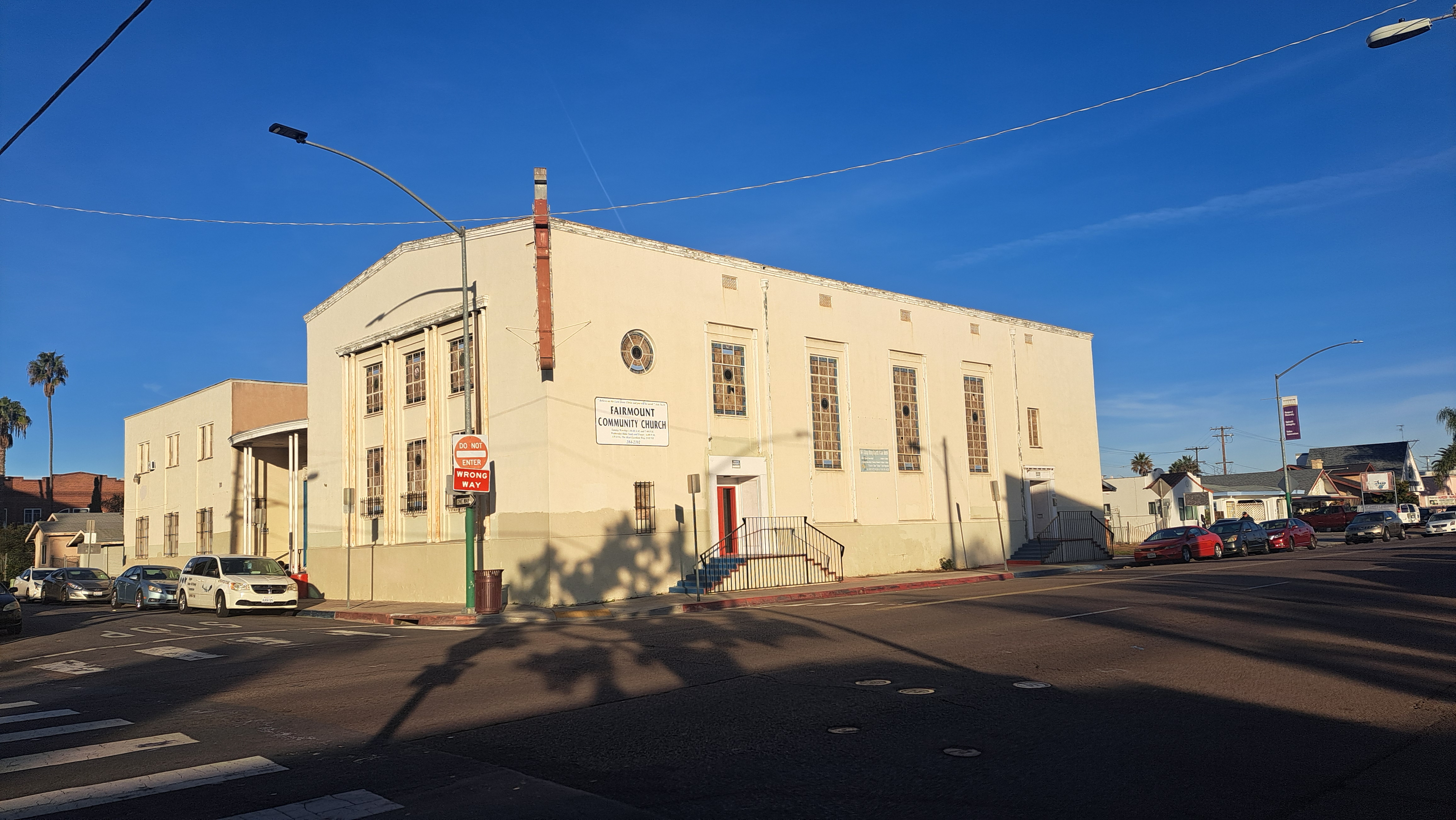
Fairmount Community Church, 4100 Fairmount Ave

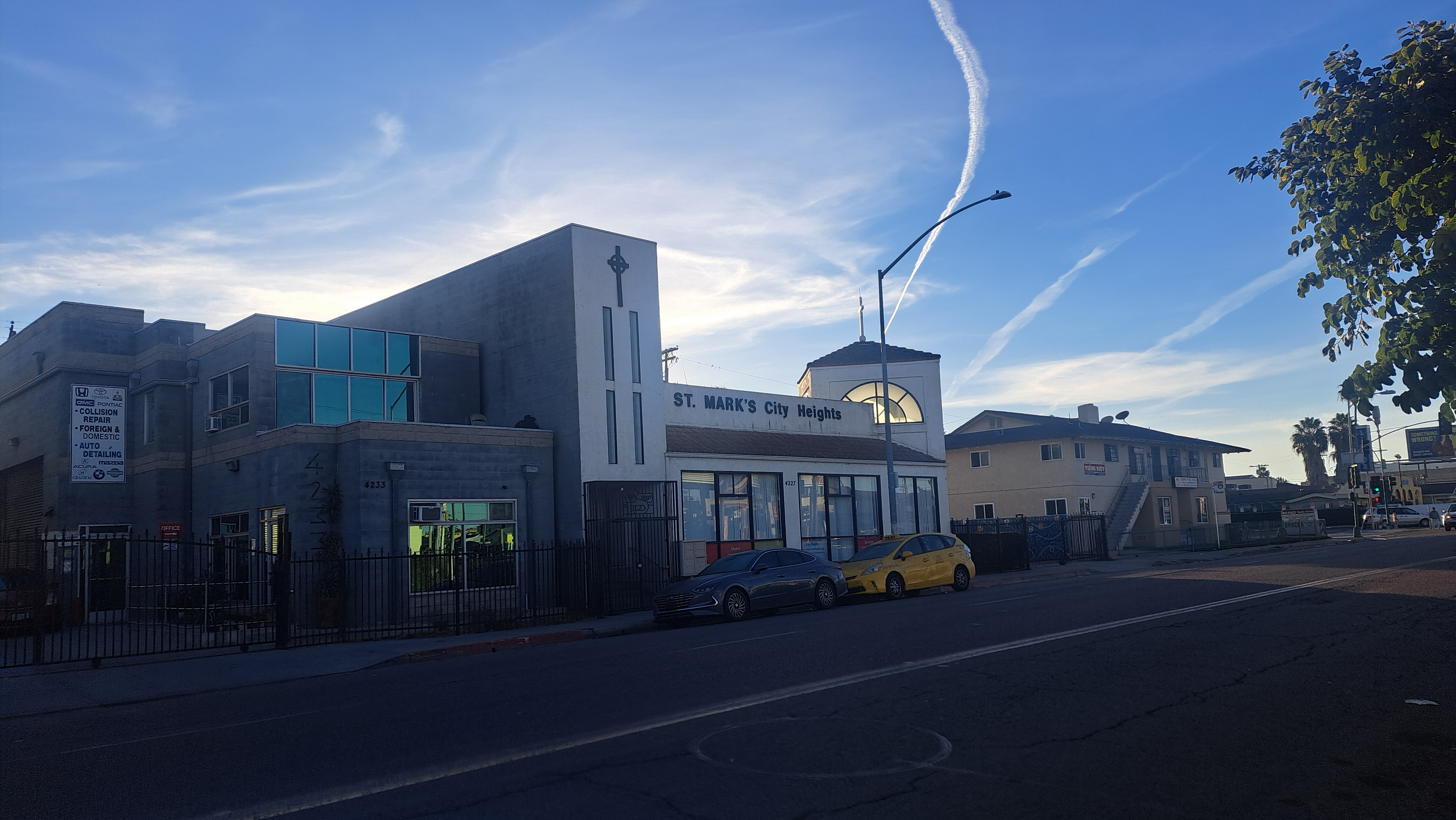
St. Marks Episcopal Church, 4227 Fairmount Ave

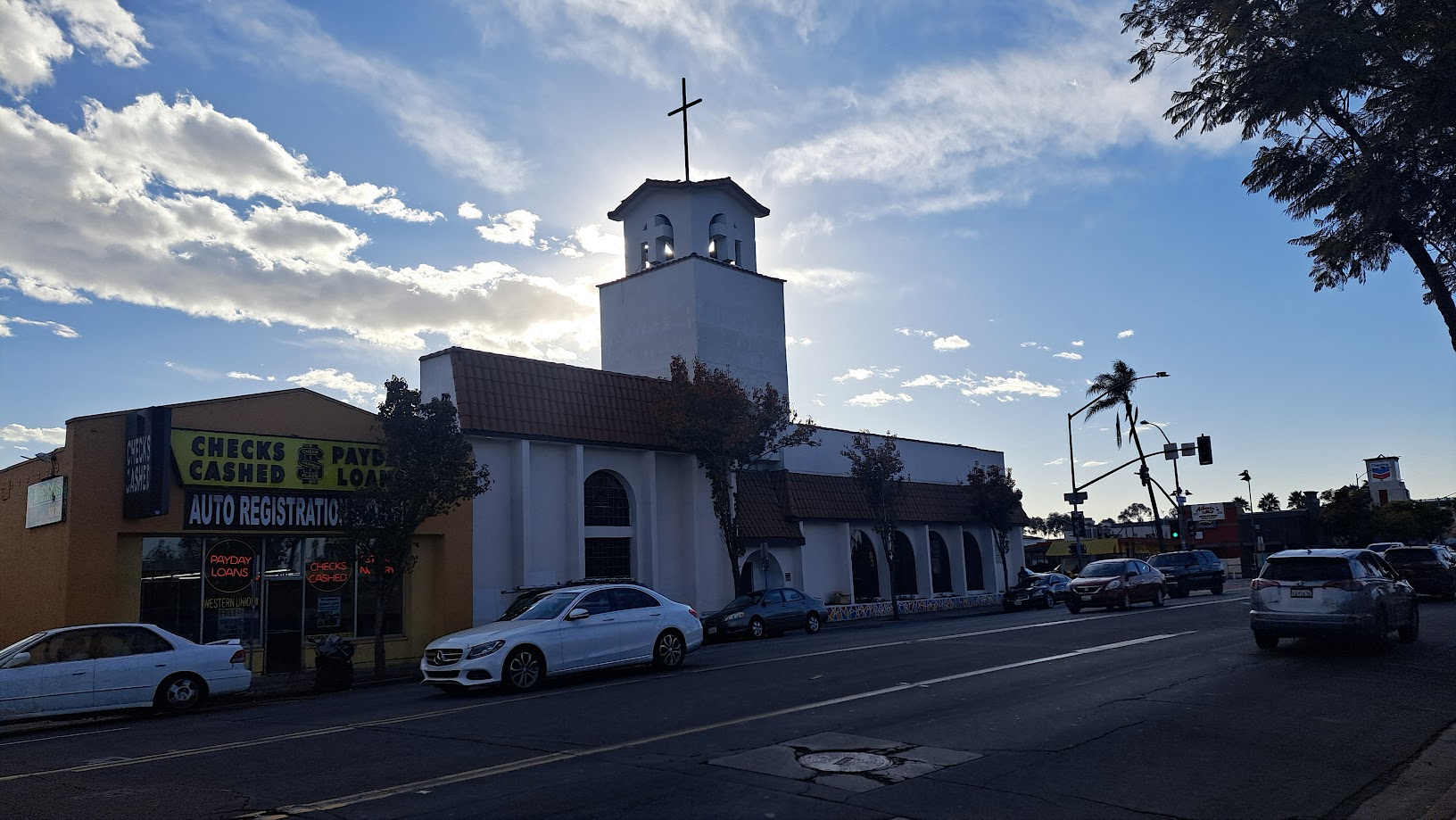
Mid City Church of the Nazarene, 4101 University Ave

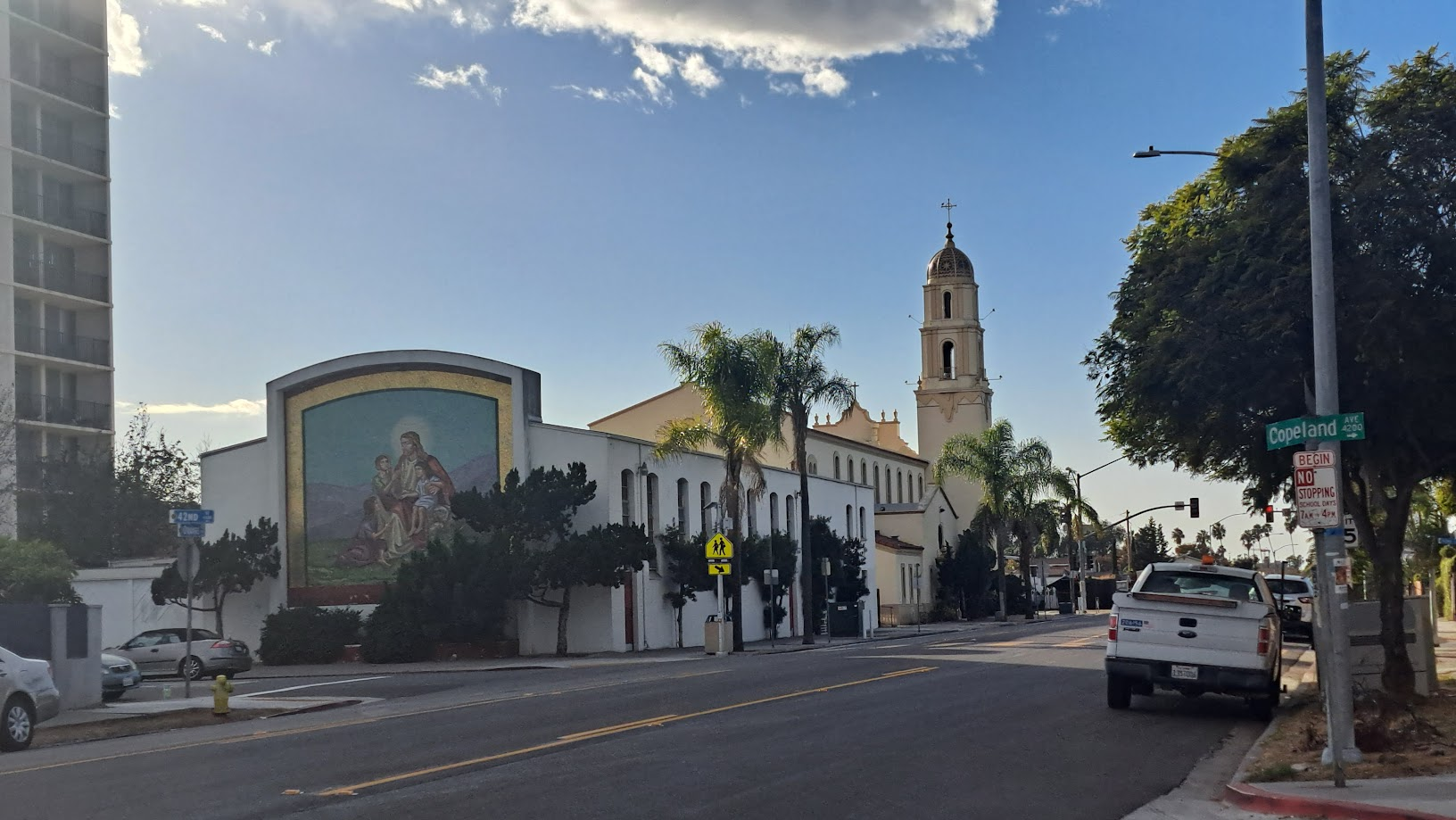
Our Lady of the Sacred Heart Catholic Church, 4177 Marlborough Ave

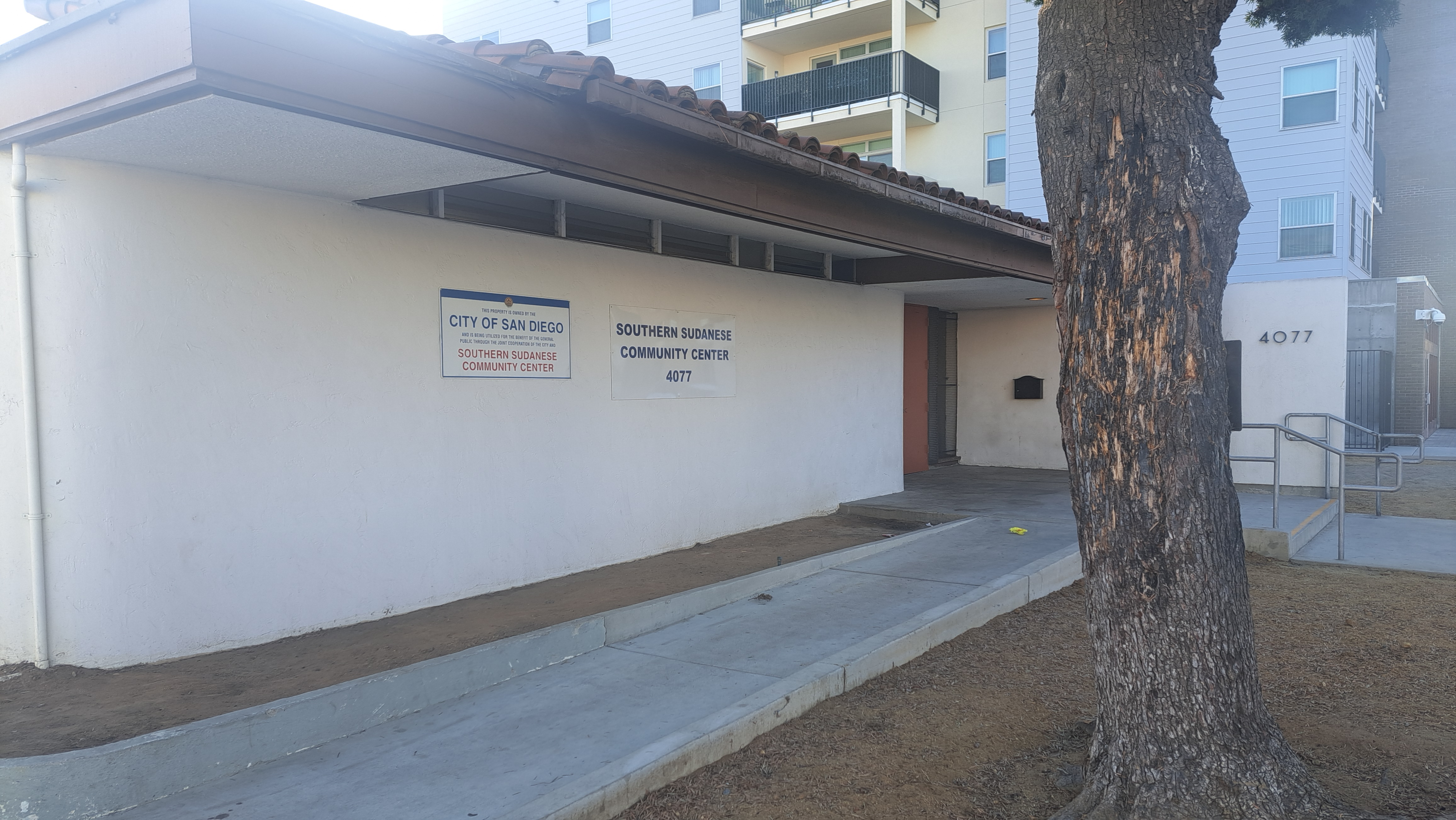
Southern Sudanese Community Center, 4077 Fairmount Ave

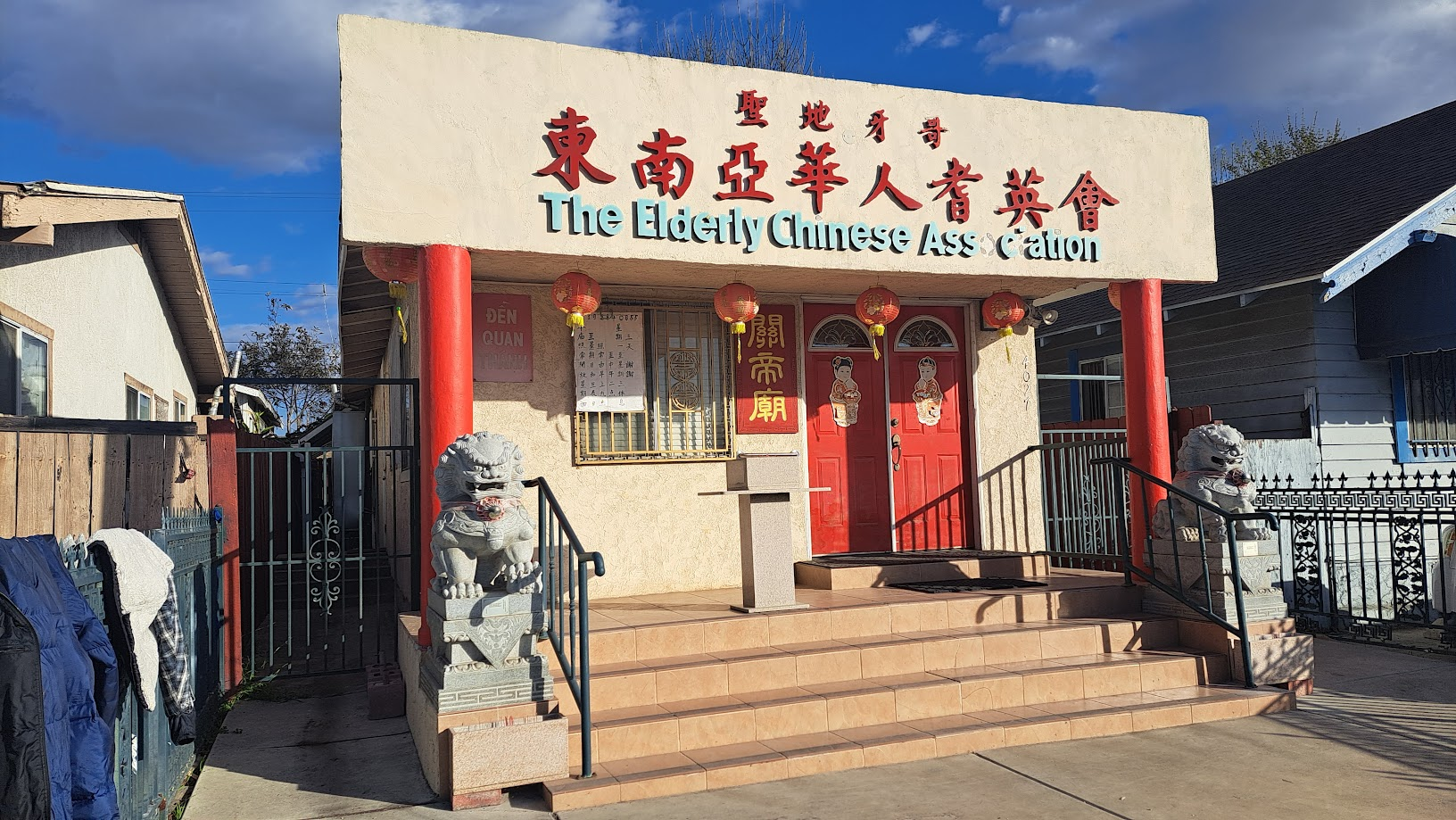
The Elderly Chinese Association of San Diego, 4027 Marlborough Ave.

=== Environment ===
- Chollas Creek Restoration Project 2020-2022: Chollas Creek will be renovated with a $3.5 million grant from the California Natural Resources Agency. The area will be made walkable, with the removal concrete from the creek and addition of walkways, bike paths and native plant life alongside a half-mile segment of Chollas Creek that runs beside Martin Luther King Freeway (state Route 94).
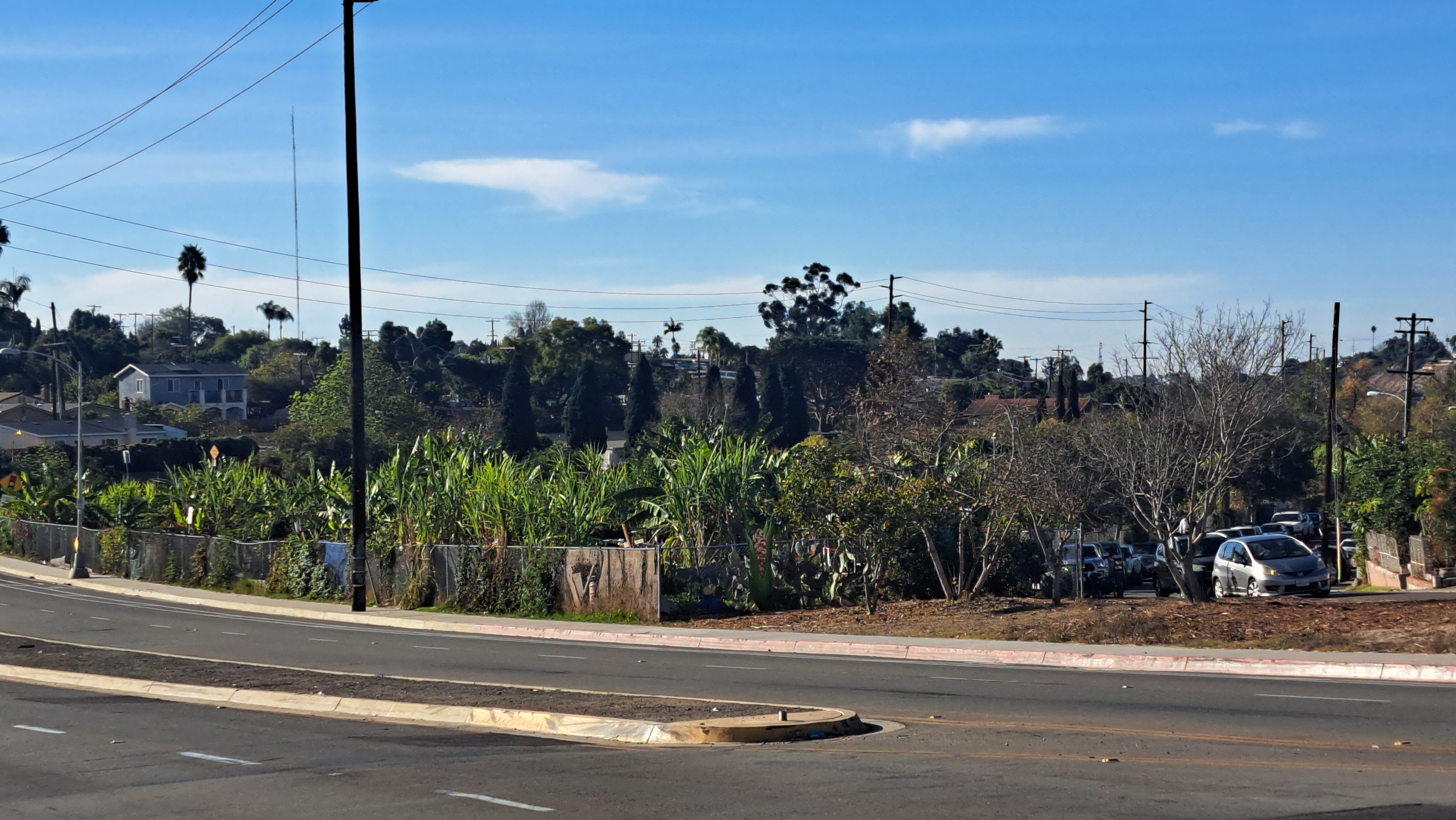
- New Roots Community Farm, 5340 Chollas Pkwy N
  New Roots Community Farm: operated by tenant farmers who are refugees from many countries. In 2010, Michelle Obama visited the farm to promote her Let's Move! campaign against childhood obesity. It has been managed by City Heights Community Development Corporation (CDC) since 2019. In 2023, facing eviction threats, the farmers filed paperwork to form a non-profit and operate it themselves. In January 2024, the CDC locked the gates on the farmers and, after a confrontation with a security, it was reported that the management company does not have a lease agreement with the city or a Letter of Agency on file with the police allowing them to arrest trespassers despite a sign posted on the gate.
- The Azalea Park Arts District (APAD): The Manzanita Gathering Place was built to be a creative refuge awash in art at the opening at Manzanita Canyon, with canopies and columns incorporating mosaic tiles made by Azalea Park residents. At the Azalea Community Park, local artists have created the Water Conservation Garden, with a collection of succulent plants and sculpture.
- The Revolutionary Grower’s Garden: As of 2023, the San Diego chapter of the Black Panther Party has been maintaining a community garden near the intersection of University Ave and 39th Street.
- As of 2017, there were hiking trails in at least seven canyons in City Heights.

== Little Saigon ==
The Little Saigon San Diego Foundation was established in November 2008 with a stated mission to "revitalize the densely populated Vietnamese business district of El Cajon Boulevard."

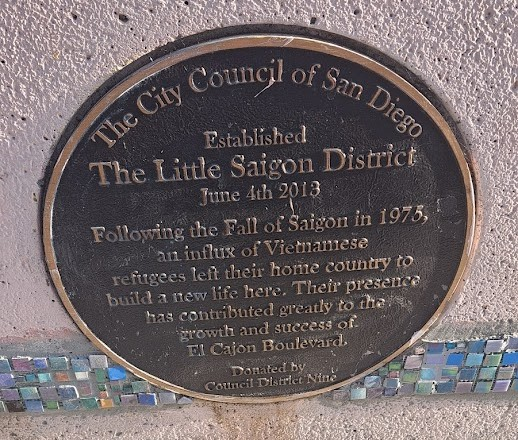

On June 4, 2013, City Council approved Little Saigon Cultural and Commercial District in City Heights, which is a six-block section of El Cajon Boulevard from Euclid to Highland avenues. The district would be known as a center for Vietnamese food and culture. Since 2013, the Little Saigon San Diego Foundation has organized one of the Vietnamese New Year (Tết) events in the city with the annual Lunar New Year festival at SDCCU Stadium, where proceeds would go towards developing and promoting the district.

On February 1, 2019, the Little Saigon signs were revealed to be installed near El Cajon Boulevard exits on Interstate 15.

== Transportation ==
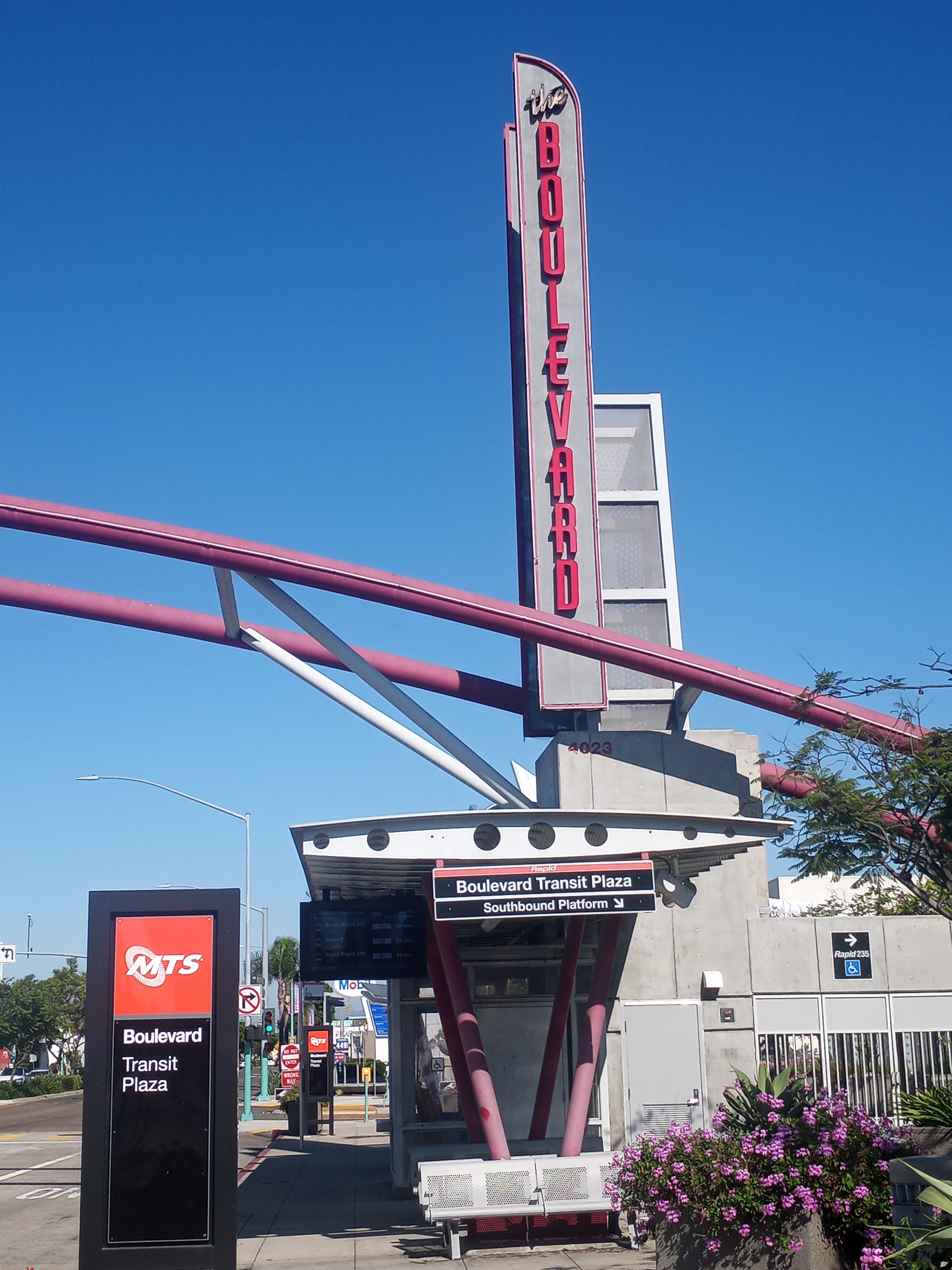
Boulevard Transit Plaza

Residents resisted the construction of SR 15 Freeway for years, forcing freeway drivers to take detours or drive in city streets to get downtown, but in the 1990's Caltrans forcefully evicted families to build it.

Major commercial streets include University Avenue, El Cajon Boulevard, Fairmount Avenue, and Euclid Avenue.

The neighborhood is served by MTS 1, 7, 10, 13, 60, 852, 955 and 965 bus lines, as well as the 215 and 235 Rapid Transit lines.

In 2018, freeway level "Centerline" transit stations along the SR 15 Freeway were finished at El Cajon Boulevard and University Avenue to improve traffic congestion for the rapid 235 bus line.

== Education ==
City Heights is home to twelve public elementary schools, three public middle schools, two public high schools, and two private grade schools, three charter schools and the Mid-City Campus of the San Diego College of Continuing Education.

All public schools are in San Diego Unified School District.

=== Public elementary schools ===
- Central
- Cherokee Point
- Hamilton
- Euclid
- Marshall
- Edison
- Florence Griffith Joyner
- Herbert Ibarra
- Mary Lanyon Fay
- Wilson
- Rowan
- Rosa Parks

=== Public middle schools ===
- Clark (Monroe)
- Wilson
- Mann

=== Public high schools ===
- Hoover High School
- Crawford Educational Complex (former Will C. Crawford High School)
  - Community Health and Medical Practices School (CHAMPS)
  - Invention and Design Educational Academy (IDEA)
  - School of Law and Business (LAB)
  - Multimedia and Visual Arts School (MVAS)

=== Charter schools ===
- Health Sciences High & Middle College (HSHMC)
- Health Sciences Middle School
- City Heights Prep Academy
- Gompers Preparatory Academy
- San Diego Global Vision Academy
- Arroyo Paseo Charter High* School
- Iftin Charter School

=== Private grade schools ===
- Waldorf School of San Diego

=== Private high schools ===
Waldorf School of San Diego High School

=== Education Gallery ===
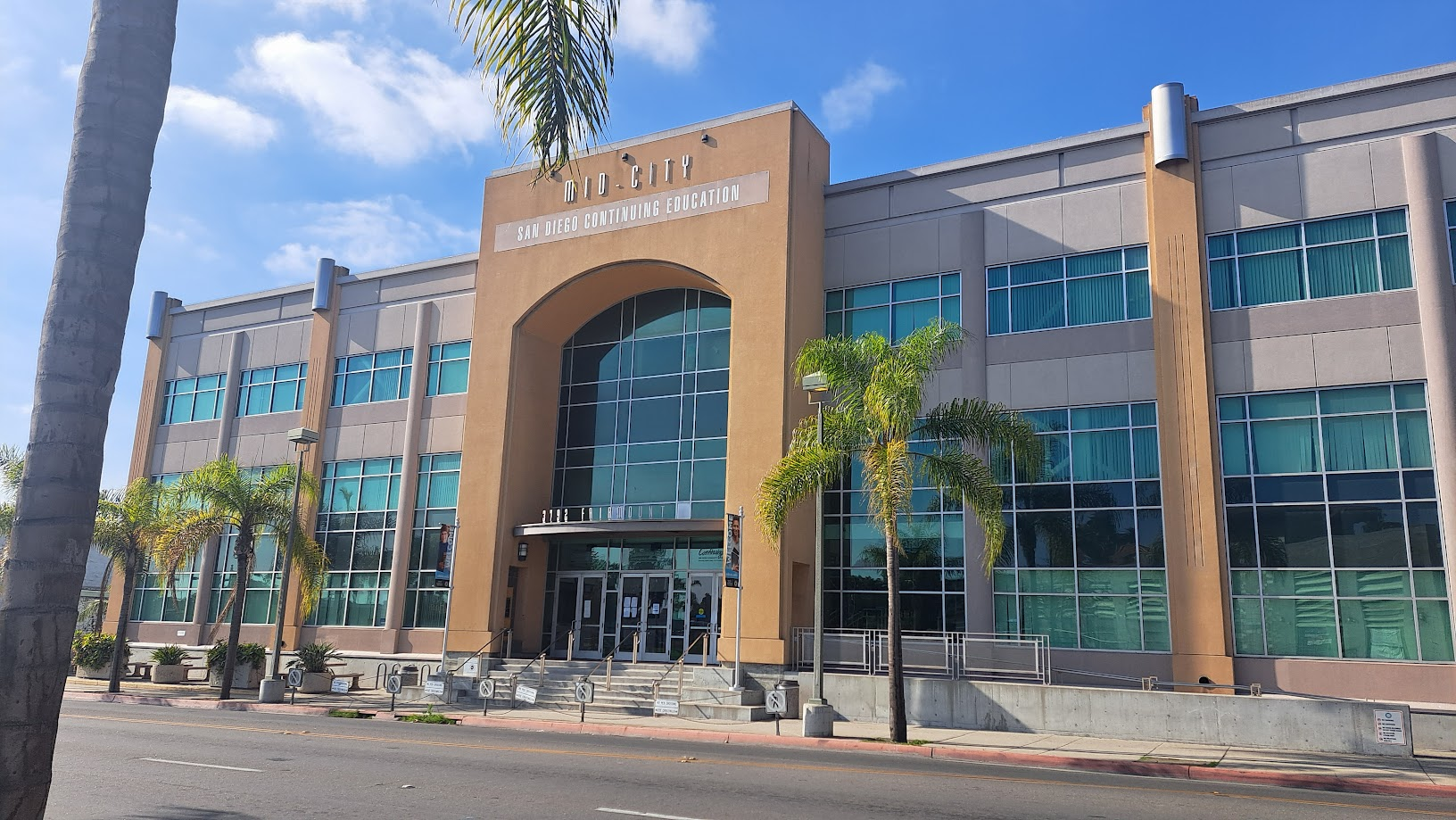
San Diego College of Continuing Education - Mid City Campus

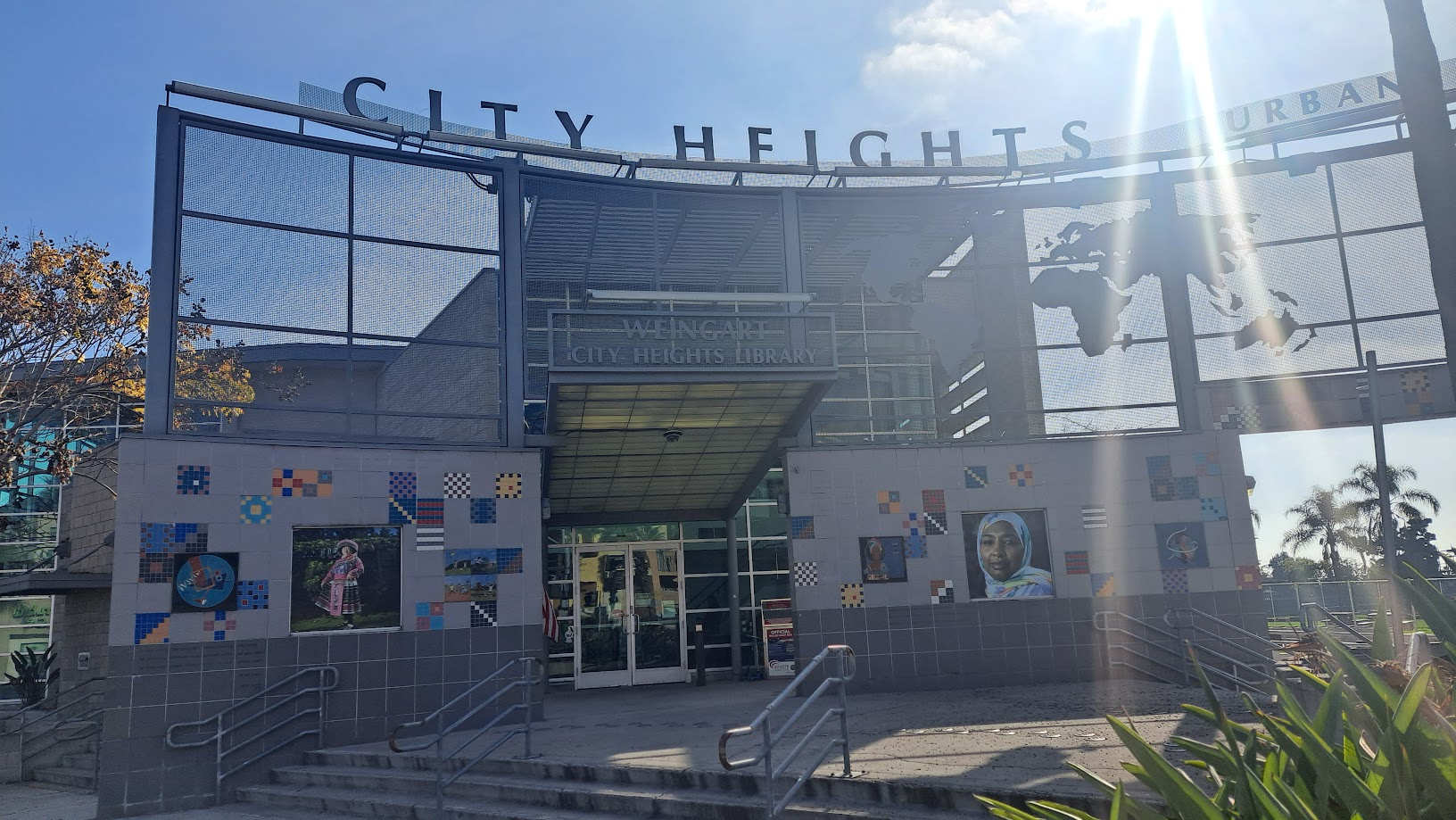
City Heights-Weingart Branch of the San Diego Public Library

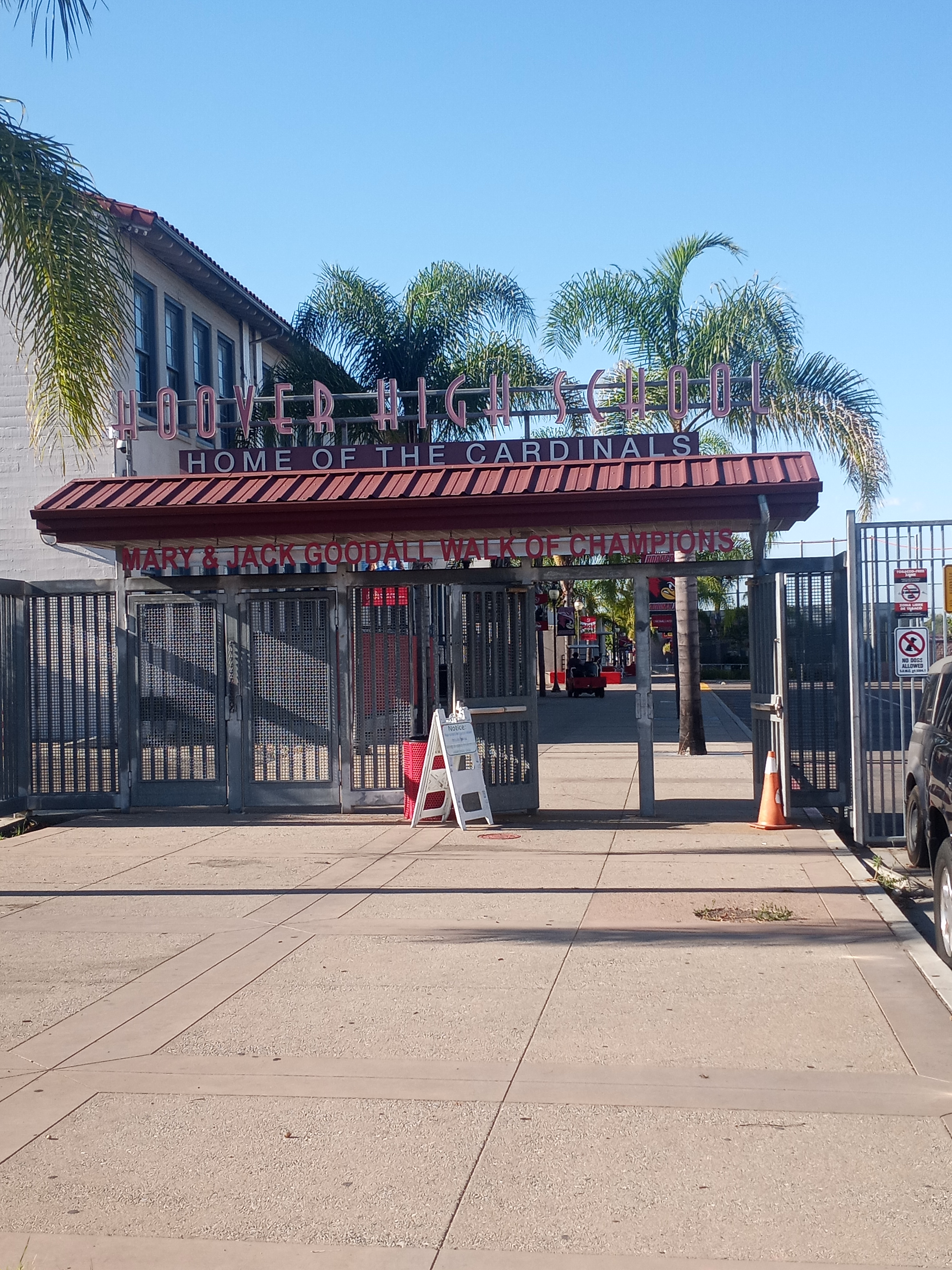
Hoover High School Security Gate

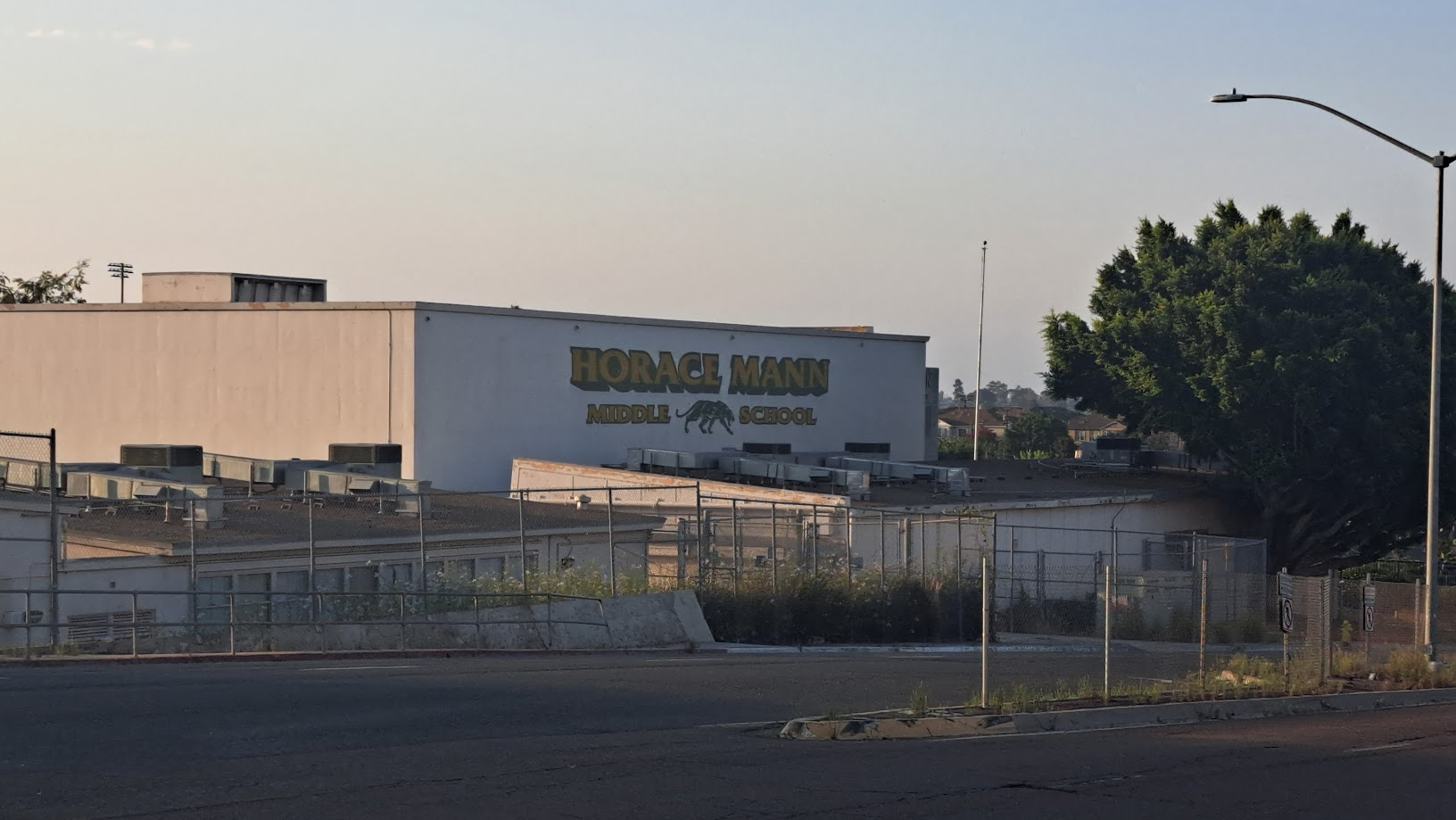
Horace Mann Middle School

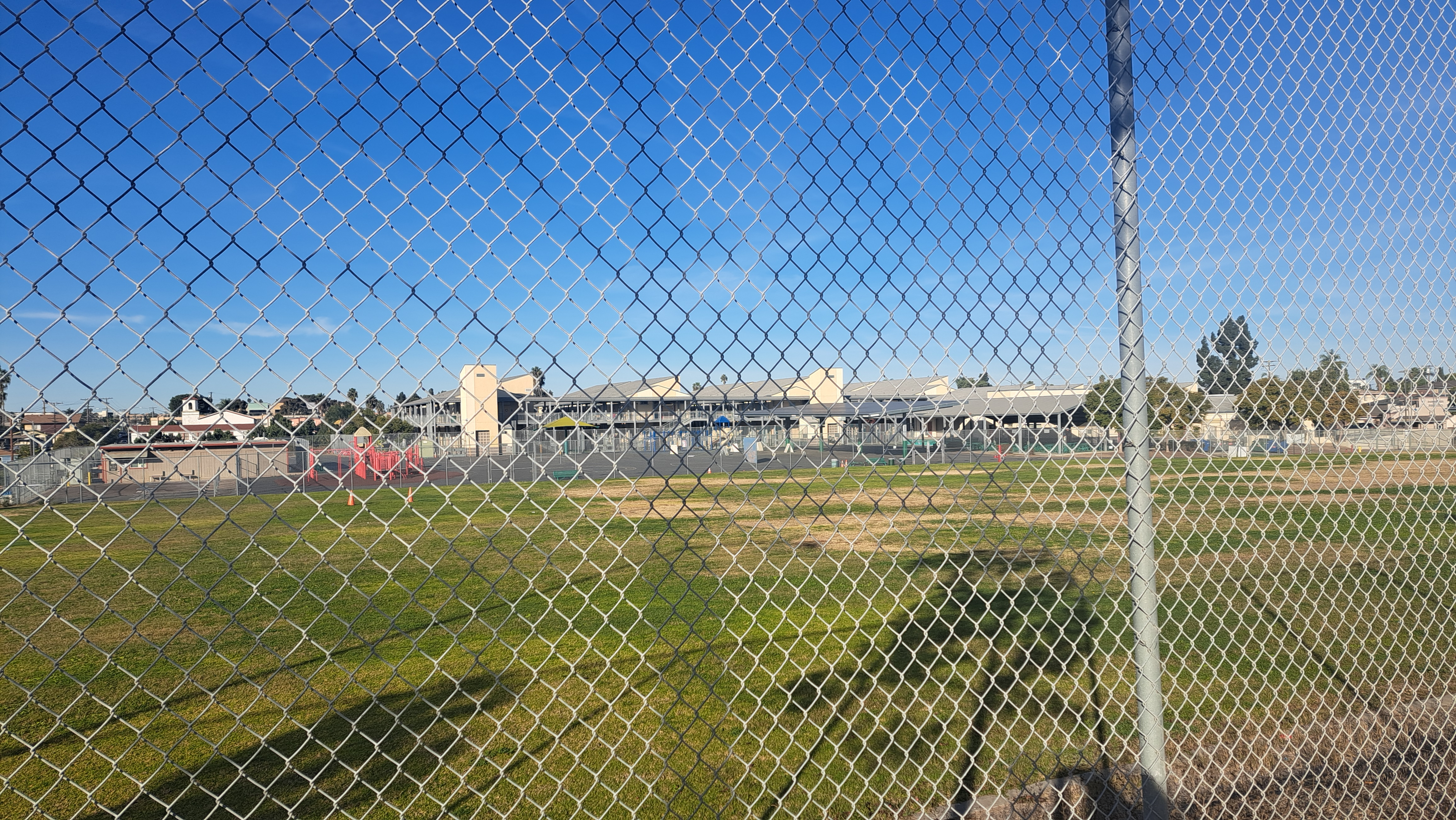
Ibarra Elementary School

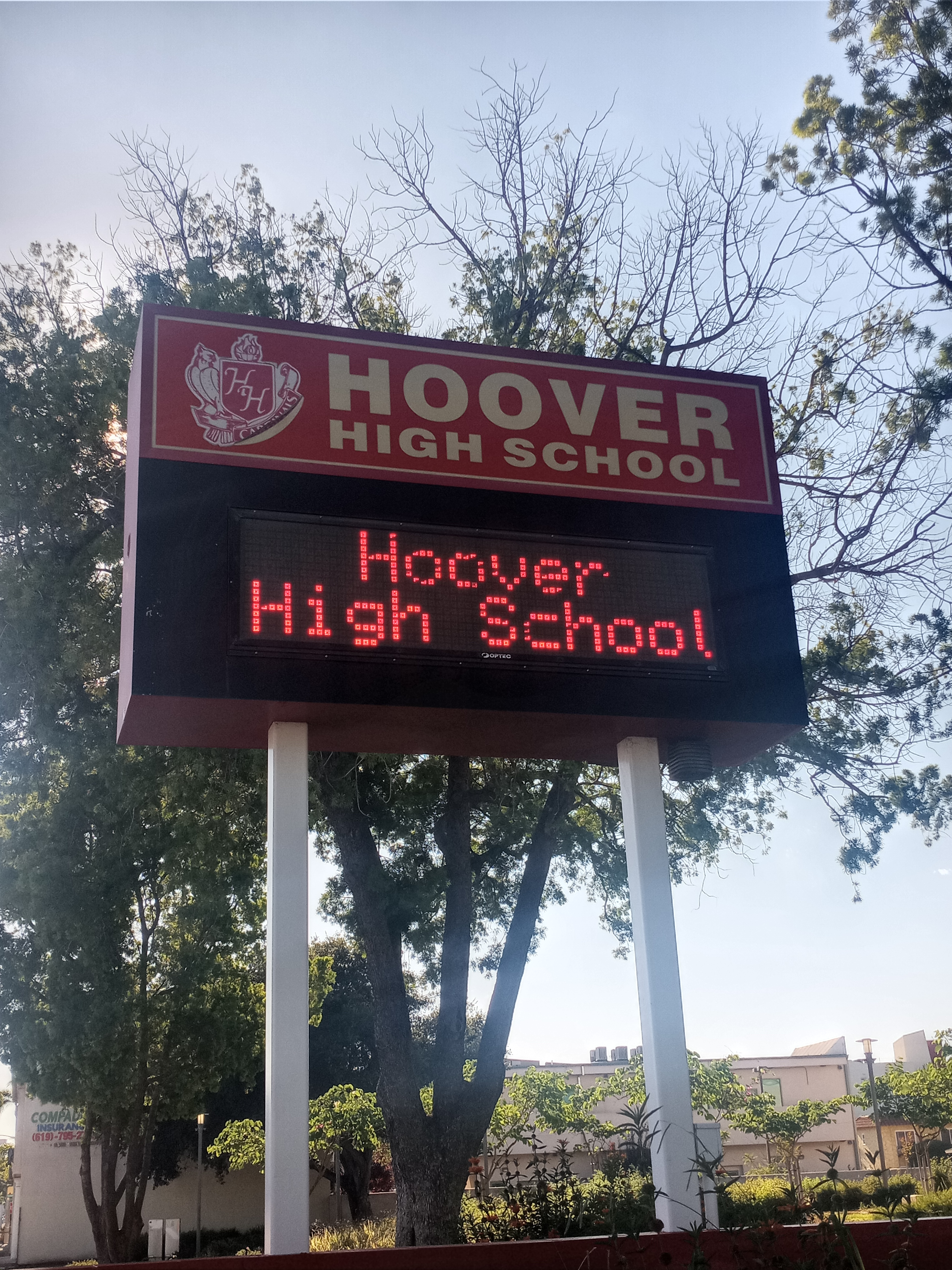
Hoover High School

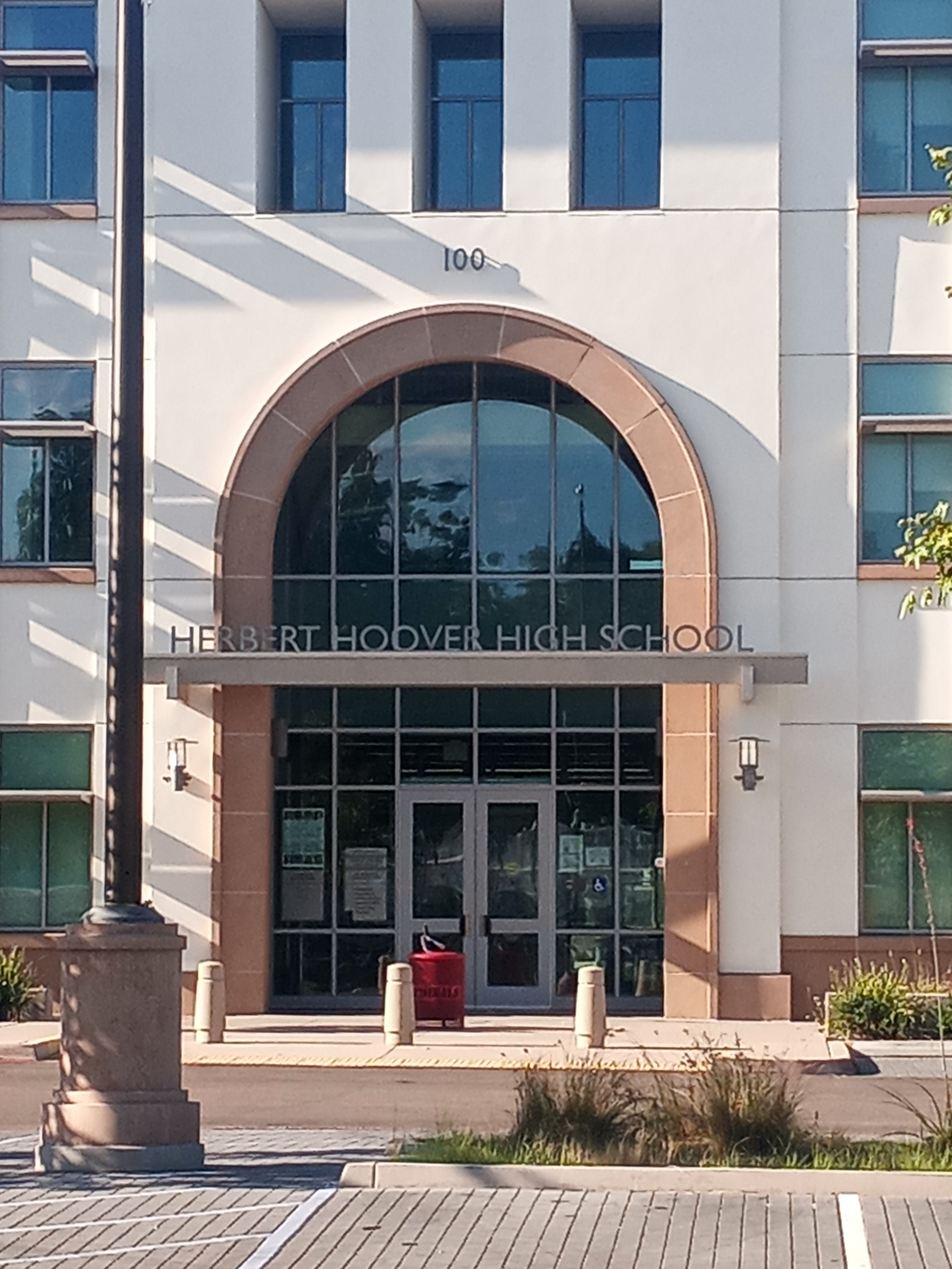
Hoover High School

As of June 2024, Central Elementary School's old campus has been closed and is due to be replaced by an affordable housing complex. Its new campus is located at 3878 Orange Avenue.

== Government ==
The area is part of City Council District 9, represented by Sean Elo-Rivera as of 2025. City Heights is also part of California's 80th State Assembly district, represented by David Alvarez as of 2025. The City Heights Area Planning Committee and the City Heights Community Planning Group advise the city on land use and other issues. Volunteer organizations include the City Heights Town Council and the City Heights Business Association. The City Heights Community Recreation Group and the Colina Del Sol Recreation group have authority to advise the city on park district matters in different parts of City Heights.
