= East San Diego =

Coordinates: 32.7494°N 117.1100°W

East San Diego was an independent, short-lived city that existed from 1912 to 1923 in what is now the City Heights neighborhood of San Diego, California. It had a population of about 4,000. The town had its own city hall and police department.

The city of East San Diego called itself the "Golden Rule City" and enacted conservative laws. The city did not allow gambling or alcohol, and enforced a maximum speed of 25 mph on all city streets. However, an inability to generate enough tax revenue to support city services forced East San Diego to merge with the City of San Diego in 1923. Boundary Street is a lasting relic of the former border between the two cities.
