= Gender-specific prison programming in the United States =

Gender-specific prison programming in the United States are programs created to prepare incarcerated women for successful reentry, and minimize recidivism. Prison programming and how it is structured has changed significantly over the decades to fit the needs of women in gender-specific programming. Focus on gender-specific programming increased during the 1970s and 1980s, an era marked by a substantial increase in the female prison population. Traditional programming in female correctional facilities have been deemed ineffective since most were structured to fit men's needs. For example, women's pathways to prison typically involve drugs, while men are typically involved in violent crimes. Additionally, women are more likely to have experiences of sexual and/or physical abuse relative to men.

== History of programming in women's prisons ==
=== Before 1980 ===
Programming for imprisoned women was centered on domesticity, although efforts were made to include industrial training programs and academic programs. For example, the Indiana Women's Prison tried to incorporate chair caning, paper-boxing making, glove stitching, and laundry, which, with the exception of the latter, were deemed "financially disappointing." Academic classes were difficult to maintain due to staff and funding shortages, and differences in education levels among the women. At another institution in Framingham, Massachusetts, administrators implemented an indenture system, a conditional early release program that allowed women to serve as domestic servants in nearby homes located on the country side, which proved to be rather successful with a less than nine percent recidivism rate for those who participated in the program. Domesticity was also promoted by prisoner officials. For example, in 1896, former superintendent Sarah Keely described the work offered to women as being appropriate, since it reflected work in a familial setting. The lucrative nature and accessibility of acquiring domestic skills contributed to their lack of participation in higher skills training. Despite efforts to equip female inmates with remunerative skills, programming throughout the early and mid-1900s continued to consist of limited educational and vocational opportunities. Job training programming mostly entailed training in as cleaning, sewing, cosmetology, food service, laundry, and clerical work, programs that did not lead women to meaningful and financially secure job opportunities upon release. It has been noted that use of such programs persisted since most women entered prison with little to no education or work experience.

Prior to the 1980s, there was a lack of programming focused on drug treatment for incarcerated women, and even less research regarding the outcomes of treatment programs in general. Research regarding the relationship between women and substance abuse had begun only a few years earlier during the 1970s, and focused primarily on alcohol treatment services, rather than drug treatment services. Furthermore, since the female prison population was relatively small, male substance abuse treatment had set the standard. Two of the earliest research studies investigated the outcomes of Cornerstone program (Oregon, 1976), and the Stay'n Out program (New York, 1974), with the latter conducted at an all-female facility. While these programs were found to be successful, it was noted that other male-oriented programming such as urine testing and drug education courses were generally ineffective for female offenders. Only during the 1980s and 1990s did research regarding gender-specific programming for women become more prevalent.

=== 1980s to late 1990s ===
During the 1980s and the early 1990s, researchers began investigating how substance abuse affected women and men differently, and how women functioned in traditional treatment programs. Researchers found that the characteristics of female substance abuse differed from male substance abuse in several ways including pathways to drug use, psychosocial factors, and psychological impacts of drug use. One study conducted in California prisons found that nearly 80% of women reported some form of physical and/or sexual abuse followed by post-traumatic stress disorder (PTSD). Furthermore, it was observed that in traditional drug and alcohol programs such as Alcohol Anonymous (AA) and Narcotics Anonymous (NA), women had lower participation rates in all aspects including entry, retention, and completion compared to those of their male counterparts. The emphasis on gender-specific programming was further substantiated by the fact that a greater proportion of women than men were serving sentences for drug-related offenses during this period of time. In highlighting the relationship between women's drug use to other issues such as poverty, abuse, race and gender inequalities, studies acknowledged the ineffectiveness of isolated, treatment options. As a result of this research, several designs for an effective gender-specific program were identified. Some of most common characteristics included female-only environments, promotion of female empowerment, skill building, mutual exchange, and relational orientation.

One major effort designed to achieve gender-specific substance abuse treatment include the implementation and monitoring of therapeutic communities (TCs), which are characterized by the National Institute for Drug Abuse as "drug-free residential settings that use a hierarchical model with treatment stages that reflect increased levels of personal and social responsibility". TCs have been a national model for drug abuse treatment historically found in male facilities, but have appeared in female facilities. While male-oriented TCs tend to use authoritarian and aggressive approaches, female-oriented TCs take a more relaxed, and less confrontational approach. In both cases, TCs have been successful in reducing recidivism. For example, the Stay'n Out program was shown to reduce recidivism rates for both women and men. Furthermore, women who stayed in the program for 9 to 12 months were more likely to successfully complete their parole compared to their male counterparts. For women suffering from severe and long-term abuse, a more intense TC, residential TC, was implemented. Women in these residential programs lived together, and away from the general prison population. Despite this being most needed form of treatment for women, in 1994, most prisons lacked this type residential programming, with less than nine percent of women receiving such treatment while incarcerated.

In addition to TC programs being successful, they tend to be less expensive than the cost of incarceration. In 1993, the Center for Substance Abuse Treatment, an initiative developed under the Substance Abuse and Mental Health Services Administration (SAMHSA), began funding mid-term and long-term residential TC programs for incarcerated women. These programs tend to last anywhere from fifty days to six months. In addition, they began funding one residential program, and two intensive intervention programs which lasted at least six months, and on average two weeks, respectively. One TC program was roughly $790,000 for 250 women, or approximately $3,200 per inmate, while the cost of incarceration ranged from $20,000 and $30,000, supporting the idea that incarceration is more expensive than treatment. In the case of CSAT-sponsored programs, the average cost of incarceration was roughly $51, while the cost of treatment was $9.22 per woman.

In the early 1990s, post-secondary educational programs were solely academic in nature, and in women's prisons, were either nonexistent, or underutilized, with less than 10 percent of female prison population enrolled in educational programming. In 1994, this number further decreased due to inmates' ineligibility for the Pell grant and other financial aid. Funding for educational programming included federal grants, private donors, as well as state financial aid, as seen in North Carolina and California.

== Substance abuse programming ==
Traditionally, the most common treatment for substance abuse stems from a medical model, which views addiction disease. This model sees disease of addiction as being rooted solely in the individual. Relatively recent research suggests that addiction can be best understood holistically, as evident in the more recent programming that focus on other aspects of the individual. Currently, most female correctional facilities contain a range of evidence-based programming for substance abuse that have been shown to both reduce recidivism, and promote positive social behavior. Most of the substance abuse programs are largely funded by organizations such as CSAT. In addition to residential TCs, prison-based substance abuse programming may include detoxification units, inpatient drug treatment, outpatient treatment or counseling, self-help group/peer counseling, education/awareness, or maintenance program. Volunteering professionals across several disciplines often run these programs, since effective gender-responsive programming should address substance abuse holistically. While there has been an increase in the number of substance abuse treatment options, research regarding their effectiveness has reduced since the late 1990s. The outcome evaluations that come during the early 2000s focus primarily on programming elements that contribute to high levels of effectiveness. For example, a 2001 study of treatment investigated the effectiveness of receiving treatment (versus not receiving treatment), group type (mixed versus female only), and the type of women's treatment (enhanced vs standard).

== Professional development/employment ==
=== Vocational training ===
Vocational training covers a wide range of occupations including trade skills such as auto mechanics, and electrical work or other occupational skills such as culinary arts, warehousing, and other hands-on work experience. Nonetheless, there tends to be far less vocational training programs in women's facilities compared to male facilities, even though women are more likely to take advantage of such programs. Vocational training programs currently provided in female correctional facilities are much like those seen throughout the 1980s and 1990s. They are gender-stereotyped and lower-skill opportunities such as sewing, clerical work, food services, and cosmetology. The use of these types of vocational programs has been described as ironic since some state legislatures prohibit ex-offenders from entering such fields. In 2003, at least six states had barred ex-offenders from public employment, prohibiting them opportunities in approximately 350 higher-skilled occupations, thus restricting women to low-paying jobs upon reentry.

By far, vocational training and work assignments have ranked highest among women's priorities. Due to limitations and high demands of these programs, enrollment is quite difficult. In some cases, the waitlists tend to be longer than the number of students. In one survey conducted in 1995, vocational was identified as a top priority, but only 14 to 28 percent of women were actually enrolled. Furthermore, the educational eligibility requirements for vocational training tend to result in underutilization of programs since some require higher levels of education. For example, a business program at a New Hampshire women's facility in the 1990s was inaccessible since most women lacked the educational requirements. Additionally, access to stable employment is often compounded by the fact that newly released women have limited access to adequate transportation and resources, which reduces the likelihood of long-term employment. The existence of vocational program is not enough to recidivism; the quality of the program, and the need for that occupation must also be taken into account. More specifically, the program must train women in widely available fields experiencing shortages, and must in an area that will provide a living wage. For example, a temporary plumbing maintenance program was implemented throughout correctional facilities in New York State during the early 2000s, a time where plumbers were of relatively high demand.

One of the strongest indicators of stable employment is education. Studies of women in state correctional facilities reveal a positive relationship between educational level and probability of employment. Furthermore, higher education has been shown to increase self-esteem. The high regard for post-secondary is not reflected in prison programming. Over 90 percent of state prisons provide educational programs that focus on GED preparation and adult basic education, but only a few prisons offer programming in post-secondary education. Furthermore, participation in educational programs is relatively lower than participation in vocational training, and work assignments. The challenge to complete coursework appears specifically when competing with participation in paid work assignments. In a comparative study of women's participation in programming, less than half, 34 percent of women participated in educational programming, while 70 percent of women had work assignments.

=== Postsecondary education ===
College education is becoming increasingly important for advancement in the labor market. Consequently, more focus is being placed on higher education in correctional facilities. Some prisons have developed relationships with local community colleges to form postsecondary correctional education (PSCE) programs. Such programs allow individuals to take credited (or non-credited) college level courses. Through funding, these programs are offered at discounted rates, or at no cost to the inmate. The programs vary in length, eligibility requirements, eligibility, course type, and program structure.

== See also ==
- Gender responsive approach for girls in the juvenile justice system
- Gender-responsive prisons
- Incarceration of women in the United States
- Sex differences in crime
