= Gender-responsive prisons =

Gender-responsive prisons (also known as gender-responsive corrections or gender-responsive programming) are prisons constructed to provide gender-specific care to incarcerated women. Contemporary sex-based prison programs were presented as a solution to the rapidly increasing number of women in the prison industrial complex and the overcrowding of California's prisons. These programs vary in intent and implementation and are based on the idea that female offenders differ from their male counterparts in their personal histories and pathways to crime. Multi-dimensional programs oriented toward female behaviors are considered by many to be effective in curbing recidivism.

== Gender bias vs gender responsiveness ==
When considering gender-responsive prisons, it is important to keep in mind that gender responsiveness is distinct from gender bias. Gender bias demonstrates a partiality or favoritism towards a specific gender and results in unfair treatment. Gender responsiveness, on the other hand, aims at supplying gender-specific care with the hope of ultimately improving treatment under the justice system. It hopes to take into account the differences in life experiences that men and women may undergo, as well as provide strategies and practices that appropriately respond to those experiences.

=== What is gender-responsiveness for women offenders in the criminal justice system? ===
According to Bloom and Covington, gender-responsiveness includes creating environments that respond to the realities of women's lives and address the issues that are specific to their lived experiences. This often includes the site selection, the selection of staff and other employees at criminal justice locations, the development of various programming and rehabilitation efforts, content, and additional materials. Gender-responsive pathways are supposed to address the multitude of pathways that women interact with the world and the criminal justice system, as well as the ways in which they enter this system. Gender-responsive approaches are aimed at addressing social, cultural, and therapeutic interventions and issues like abuse, violence, family relationships, substance abuse, and comorbid disorders. Gender-responsiveness focuses on self-efficacy, treatment, and skills-building.

There are several elements to consider when determining if a practice or approach can be deemed gender-responsive. These include:

- Relationship-based: promote mutual respect and empathy by acknowledging the roles that relationships and connection can play in the personal and relational growth and strength of women
- Strengths-based: recognize and mobilize the strengths, talents, and assets of women
- Trauma-informed: acknowledge the history and context that violence against women and trauma play in the way that they respond to programs and services
- Culturally competent: understand and account for the diverse backgrounds and cultural contexts of women
- Holistic: acknowledge the larger context of women's lives when considering decision-making and behaviors of women.

== History ==
The 19th century was important because instead of relying on corporal methods of punishment, incarceration was seen as the main tool of punishment. In the United States, authorities began housing women in correctional facilities separate from men in the 1870s. The first American female correctional facility with dedicated buildings and staff was the Mount Pleasant Female Prison in Ossining, New York; the facility had some operational dependence on nearby Sing Sing, a men's prison.

Unlike prisons designed for men in the United States, state prisons for women evolved in three waves. First, women prisoners were imprisoned alongside men in "general population," where they were subject to sexual attacks and daily forms of degradation. In an attempt to address these issues, women prisoners were removed from general population and housed separately, wherein they did not receive the same resources as men in prisons. In the third stage of development, women in prison were then housed completely separately in fortress-like prisons, where the goal of punishment was to indoctrinate women into traditional feminine roles.

The history of the contemporary gender-responsiveness movement can be traced back to a selection of works written by Barbara Bloom and Stephanie Covington in the early 2000s. Their case for, and articulation of gender-responsiveness, forms the theoretical backbone from which many others develop theories and/or criticisms of gender-responsive prisons. Many of the suggestions and implementation strategies forwarded in these texts were integral in constructing what we think of today as gender-responsive prisons.

=== The National Institute of Corrections Gender-Responsive Project ===
In the 1990s, across the criminal justice system, more attention was paid to female offenders as their numbers increased and research suggested that there were important gender differences between offenders at various decision points in the system. Since then, the following conclusions about female offenders were made:

- They engage in qualitatively different offenses than male offenders. They also engage in offenses for different reasons than male offenders
- They pose less of a threat of violence across criminal justice systems than male offenders
- They follow different pathways into criminal behavior than male offenders

Given these differences, the Prisons Division of the National Institute of Corrections (NIC) began to work alongside the University of Cincinnati to research improved strategies for identifying female offenders. The rationale behind this stemmed from the fact that female offenders were often economically marginalized, less violent than men, and more likely to experience childhood and adult victimization, substance abuse, and diagnoses of mental illness. The research aimed to investigate whether these differences required different correctional strategies.

The NIC Gender-Responsive Project (NIC GRP) started with a pilot project in Colorado in 1999. It eventually expanded into three larger projects that took place in Maui, Missouri, and Minnesota. At the project sites, female offenders’ gender-specific risk and need factors (including victimization, mental health issues, marginalization, relationship difficulties, and substance abuse) were examined to determine whether they increased the risk for institutional misconduct or community recidivism. They were also used to determine if these factors affected the classification of women in prisons.

Overall, these studies supported the use of gender-responsive frisk factors in correctional classification systems.

In general, the results indicated that female offenders with gender-responsive risk factors adapted poorly to the prison environment. They were also more likely to incur serious misconduct violations within a year of incarceration in comparison to female offenders who did not display these characteristics. Some of these gender-responsive risk factors included women who were victimized, had substance abuse or mental health problems, and victims of domestic violence. Other gender-responsive risk factors for women in the criminal justice system will be available below.

== Effect on youth ==
Gender-responsive prisons also deal with children in detention centers. According to research conducted between 1991 and 2003, the percent of girls being put in detention centers has increased by 98%. Advocates for gender-response detention centers use statistics as a form of backing. Research has also presented 35% of girls in detention centers have experience with sexual abuse and 40% have been involved in cases involving domestic abuse. A study conducted in 2015 analyzed the different effects that gender-responsive programming has on boys and girls. In the findings, it was shown that gender-responsive programming works for young girls with a history of emotional trauma or mental issues. Their needs are met more closely as a sense of trust within the prison community is built. Within gender-responsive programs, abused girls are given the chance to talk about challenges and safety issues, while they are promoting self-cultivation and accepting personal responsibility. However, for young girls that do not have these issues, rather they are more influenced by general factors, research shows that behavioral reinforcement programming or traditional based programming are better methods in preventing recidivism. Gender-responsive programming does not appear to reduce the overall rate of boys re-entering the juvenile facilities upon release because gender-responsive programming fails to consider the unique, gendered issues of young boys.

== Risk factors and needs for women in the criminal justice system ==
There are a variety of gender-informed assessment tools that aim at providing information about the risk level and needs of women in the criminal justice system. These include both gender-responsive factors that are specifically linked to adverse outcomes for women and gender neutral factors that are common to women and men. They attempt to recognize and mobilize women's strengths, in an effort to decrease the risk of negative outcomes (e.g. misconduct, recidivism, etc.). Gender-responsive tools were created to highlight the most pertinent needs and risk factors faced by women regarding the criminal justice system. By recognizing and addressing these needs, it is possible to better inform factors like case management, service delivery, release decisions, and condition setting (same NPCR.

Some examples of gender-responsive assessment tools include the University of Cincinnati's Women's Risk/Need Assessment and Orbis Partners’ SPIn-W.

Previous research has identified a variety of gender-responsive risk factors, as well as the gender-specific needs of women in the criminal justice system. These include histories of victimization or abuse, substance use, mental health problems, and traumatic relationships. A higher percentage of female offenders report receiving some form of public assistance prior to arrest, report being homeless, or report having lived in shelters at some point in adulthood.

=== Marital status and children ===
Relatively few women reported being married when they were first entered into the criminal justice system, though large percentages reported having at least one child under the age of 18. Moreover, female offenders tend to score higher than men on the family and marital status domain of the Level of Service Inventory. The Level of Service Inventory is a quantitative survey of offender attributes. These results suggest that this area is a particularly important risk area for female offenders.

More female offenders are also primary caregivers of their young children immediately before and immediately after their release. Also, though these roles are important, they are often overlooked, leaving many women with little support for financial or emotional care provisions. Marital status, alongside poverty, child care, and low support may reinforce female economic marginality and financial dependence on others.

=== Victimization ===
Victimization is an important risk factor that affects female offenders much more than male offenders and in different personal and social ways. More female prisoners report experiencing trauma and abuse during their lives than male prisoners. In the Minnesota NIC project site, over 60% of the women in a Minnesota prison were victimized as children, adults, or commonly both. In this population, the most commonly reported types of abuse were domestic violence in adulthood and sexual and nonsexual abuse during childhood. These trends are not limited to adult women either. In a 2006 study looking at institutionalized youth in Ohio, researchers discovered that women were significantly more likely to have encountered sexual, physical, or verbal abuse. In a similar study looking at adult female offenders in an Ohio prison, over 54% of the sampled women had been raped, 11% had been gang raped, and over 70% had been forced into sexual experiences before they were incarcerated. The effects of increased victimization among female offenders are varied and long-lasting. Victimization can affect mental health, well-being, incite delinquency, serious mental health problems, revictimization, and criminal behavior. Many women also often turn to substance use, with many female offenders suffering from comorbid drug dependencies and mental health problems. Some researchers suggest that women turn to substance use to self-medicate or deal with the burden of victimization and accompanying mental health issues.

=== Mental health ===
Many female offenders report struggling with some form of mental health problems. This has come to approximately 73% of female state inmates and 61% of female federal inmates, as opposed to 55% of male state inmates and 44% of male federal inmates. The same 2006 report also showed that many female offenders have either been diagnosed with a mental illness, hospitalized for a mental illness, or take prescription medications for mental illnesses at some point in their lives. Rates of anxiety, depression, and post-traumatic stress disorder, alongside other mood disorders, are higher among female offenders than male offenders. According to another 2006 study, the most prevalent disorders among female prisoners include drug use disorder (57%), major depression (44%), post-traumatic stress disorder (36%) and psychosis (24%). These rates were significantly higher when compared to not only male prisoners in the area, but also when compared to females in the community. This suggests that there is a pattern found among these prisoners that may be linked to history of abuse. In some states like New Jersey, gender specific behavioral health treatments have helped improve the behavior of female inmates. These women most frequently reported needing mental health treatment while in prison. This program also did not prove to disrupt any behavior therapy received before intake. Women who partook in this study often reported having better access to treatment in prison than in their community, suggesting that treatment disparities may be a cause as to why women enter the prison system, as their lack of access may have turned them to criminal activity instead.

=== Substance abuse ===
Incarcerated women are significantly more likely than incarcerated men to have a severe history of substance and drug abuse. Approximately 20% of women prisoners suffer from alcohol use disorders while 57% of women prisoners suffer from drug use disorder. These are often paired with co-occurring mental disorders or trauma. While treatments that serve both men and women may be effective for women, gender specific programs are believed to be more effective when treating females, especially those with a history of trauma or abuse. A study conducted by the Federal Bureau of Prisons also found that incarcerated women used harder drugs and for different reasons then incarcerated men. Their difficulties linked to substance abuse often were the result of their educational background, childhood family environment, mental health and physical health. Men were more likely to report using drugs to induce pleasure or entertainment, while women often reported using drugs to alleviate physical or emotional pain. Most treatments have been historically based on male experiences, resulting in the standard treatment cantering around improving self-control and seeking pleasure through other experiences. These treatment plans often do not serve to target any trauma or pain that may be correlated with someone's substance abuse. As a result, gender specific rehabilitation is thought to be more beneficial in aiding incarcerated women to live clean lives.

== Assessment ==
The two most popular approaches to understanding the needs of female offenders are known as the pathways perspective and the gender-responsive perspective.

Gender-responsive prisons provide sociocultural and therapeutic interventions through treatment and skill building within the criminal justice system.

The pathways theory has been evaluated as the unique circumstances that women are involved with, differing from those related to male offenders because of their gender, race, and class that result in criminal activity. Although it has been reviewed as a series of generalizations and criticized for its dismissal of the complex and heterogeneous circumstances that influence female offenders, Kristy Holtfreter and Katelyn Wattanaporn describe the pathways approach has been widely adopted in the field of criminology and prison reform. The pathways approach to gender-responsive treatment has been criticized by others in the field of criminology and prison reform, because it classifies female offenders as either victims of trauma, [physical and substance] abuse or mental illness; or as caretakers, mothers, and wives.

It is hypothesized that a multi-dimensional program oriented towards female behaviors is crucial for rehabilitation and a general improvement of all criminal justice phases. As part of this hypothesis, there are six 'guiding principles' that are fundamental for effective gender-responsive services. They are as follows: (1) acknowledge that gender makes a difference; (2) create an environment based on safety, dignity and respect; (3) address substance abuse, trauma and mental health issues through comprehensive, integrated, and culturally relevant services and appropriate supervision; (4) develop policies, practices and programs that are relational and promote healthy connections to children, family and significant others; (5) provide women with opportunities to improve their socio-economic conditions; (6) establish a system of community supervision and re-entry with comprehensive, collaborative services."

A 2012 study was conducted to understand the experiences of a new cognitive skills program that compares and contrasts a gender-responsive approach with a gender-neutral approach. The study involved a focus group of males and females that measured cognitive skills such as impulsivity, decision-making, interpersonal problem-solving, and influence in others. It concluded that participants were most receptive to gender-specific programs and evaluated the quality of current intervention and rehabilitation programs and whether they catered to their needs.

Another study conducted in 2010 focuses on gender-responsive programs for the Residential Substance Abuse Treatment (RSAT) program in a women's correctional facility in Michigan. Data was gathered to determine how the program aids substance abusers can break their cycle with the rehabilitation program that utilizes philosophy catered to women in an effort to address the differences in perspective and process the emotional and mental information.

A 2008 study focuses on the need for gender-responsive programming, but acknowledges the lack of research regarding the outcome of implementing gender-responsive prisons. The study is trying to understand whether gender-responsive needs contribute to poor prison adjustment and community recidivism. Data included the observation of women's needs that are being neglected within the prison complex.

=== Reproductive oppression ===
Reproductive oppression, in the context of the carceral state, is a form of gendered violence that refers to the intentional imprisonment of women during their reproductive years, neglectful healthcare, and coerced or non-consensual sterilization procedures. Gender-Responsive prisons in part were created as a response to the mistreatment experienced by women who suffered from reproductive oppression. Policy-makers and reformists argued on behalf of gender-responsive prisons by asserting that they are better able to consider the specific health needs of women. However, critics of gender-responsive prisons have claimed that regardless of how reformed a prison is, the very nature of incarceration during one's reproductive years can be considered a form of reproductive oppression. Critics also note that increased punitive policies that criminalize both perpetrators and victims of violence against women have not only increased the number of women but the frequency of reproductive oppression.

Women are more likely than men to experience parental terminations, poverty, and substance addiction, and they tend to support the notion that incarcerated women value relationships, especially familial and parental bonds. Gender-responsive prisons advocate for gender-responsive treatment that allows for women to communicate relational issues, giving them the opportunity to mend broken relationships and decrease incidents of misconduct in prison.

== Opposition ==
Limitations to the current criminal justice system have set precedence to how marginalized individuals are criminalized and unable to receive proper treatment within the prisons and outside prison walls. One criticism of the gender responsiveness model, is that it simply replaces the male prison norms it seeks to escape with female norms by categorizing and homogenizing women's experiences.

=== Intersectionality ===
Kimberlé Crenshaw, a well-known scholar who coined the phrase intersectionality, states her findings on racialized gender violence and anti-Black racism in the carceral state in her 2012 article, From Private Violence to Mass Incarceration. The current framework of mass incarceration ignores the spatial fluidity of its own persistent nature and the industrialized commodification of marginalized people. Not only that, Crenshaw also explicates the lack of intersectional lens of the framing of incarceration in regards to racialized gender and gendered race in that the dominant frame is male-focused while the focus of gender-responsive approaches to address the needs of explicit gender differences often neglects the racialized realities of particular marginalized women.

While gender-responsive prisons purport to be response to the unique needs of women, often the "woman" whose needs are in question is imagined as white, straight, and middle class. In reality, the racialized nature of the prison industrial complex results in relatively high incarceration rates of women of color. When the prison is understood as a site for imposing gender norms, it is easy to imagine it as a site of imposed gender conformity and heteronormativity, white supremacy, and xenophobia on women who do not fit into this paradigm. Thus, theory of intersectionality in prison reform highlights the need to become aware of and accommodating to the experiences of oppressed individuals rather than create a punitive system of disproportionate structural disadvantage.

Despite the inclusion of women in correctional facilities, there has been little focus on the impact of the carceral system intergenerationally through family and loved ones, particularly on women. Incarcerating women is not a trauma solitarily felt; oftentimes these women are mothers, separated from their families. The physical, emotional, and mental separation enacts an intergenerational trauma known as natal alienation, which serves to interrupt the stability of families and their reproduction. This interrupted history, and internalized belief that their families are not worth maintaining contributes to the social death of the individual. While gender-responsive prisons claim to have motherhood programs, their very existence is a weapon against the motherhood of the women of color it targets.

=== Queer and trans politics ===
Gender-responsive prisons become especially problematic for those incarcerated people who present as gender non-conforming or transgender. Trans and queer people, especially those of color or those from low-income backgrounds, are directly targeted for imprisonment. This may partly be due to the criminalization of people who do not conform to norms of white heteropatriarchy. Another potential explanation is, because queer, trans, and gender non-conforming people face stigmatization, they are more likely to experience discrimination and violence that places them proximate to illicit activity and poverty. Problems may arise when determining in what gender prison to place the individual. Once placed, that person may encounter traumatic experiences from strip searches by a police officer of an alternate gender, or increased rates of rape and assault. By using the gender binary to order the prison system, it the prison enacts an additional violence on non-binary people by placing them in an environment where their bodies are made hyper-visible, and thus more susceptible to violence.

The discussion of queer and trans liberation politics in relation to the carceral state is important in understanding the widespread and interconnected nature of state violence on marginalized people, and presents a potential for an abolitionist framework.

In discussing the relation between gender-responsive prisons and individuals who identify as gender non-conforming or transgender, research has been presented in bringing forth injustices within the prison setting. Research introduced has presented the term gender outlaws, a term in reference to individuals who do not commit to gender specific action. In the fight for Queer & Trans Politics, the Sylvia Rivera Law Project works with people regardless of their racial and gender background in ensuring a discrimination-free environment. One of their programs, the Prisoner Justice Project, provides low-income transgender people that are being involuntarily held in prison with key resources. These include life-sustaining resources and education for incarcerated transgender individuals, direct legal assistance to improve confinement conditions and decrease incarceration rates, systemic advocacy, and support for attorneys, advocates, and loved ones.

=== Penal politics ===
Gender-responsive (GR) penal policies allow for gendered governance where gendered punishment dictates how women should behave, targeting and governing females through the penal structure. Furthermore, GR penal policies coerce women to adhere to parenting and motherhood ideals belonging to the normative, white middle-class values. GR penal codes are also argued to be punitive rather than rehabilitative; thus, a possible solution may include collaboration between state institutions as well as the local community.

=== Rehabilitation ===
Bloom suggests that certain crimes committed by women do not merit incarceration but instead should be 'treated' with psychological assistance and therapy.

Studies have shown that women tend to use drugs as a form of self-medication for depression and anxiety, which result from traumatic childhood and adolescent experiences. Trauma often acts as a precursor to substance abuse in women, whereas in male offenders, trauma happens as a result of drug and substance abuse. Women offenders are 7 times more likely to experience sexual abuse and 4 times more likely to experience physical abuse when compared to their male counterparts. Women offenders’ drug histories have been consistently linked to their histories of trauma and abuse, as a 2010 study indicated that 40.5% of women offenders and 22.9% of men offenders were found to have coexisting substance abuse and mental health problems. More specifically, there is a consistent link between psychological distress, especially with psychological illnesses such as post-traumatic stress disorder (PTSD), among women who suffer from substance abuse in the criminal justice system. As a result, women offenders face a higher proportion of substance abuse disorders than male offenders. Saxena and Messina, Ph.D. scholars in the Integrated Substance Abuse Programs (ISAP) at UCLA, and Christine Grella, a professor for ISAP, argue that gender-responsive treatment's (GRT) multimodal approach allows for inclusivity in which the monolithic Therapeutic Community (TC) treatment lacks, as these treatments are historically male based. As a result, these traditional methods are thought to not properly treat females and other gender groups. These treatments are often centered around ways of strengthening self-control, not around their well-being or health.

In a study conducted in 2007, focusing on women in prison with alcohol problems, gender-responsive models are noted as important. Mendoza, a professor at the National Autonomous University, presents how social structures evident within gender-responsive prisons have limited the access and resources women are given in dealing with alcohol addiction.

Gender-responsive treatment (GRT) calls for clinically trained workers to establish a women-focused program where the aim is to facilitate rehabilitation and prevent drug relapse. The Helping Women Recover program is organized in four modules: self module, relationship module, sexuality module, and spirituality module. These modules serve to target and nurture several different areas in incarcerated women's lives in order to provide them with the skills necessary to live a more successful life. Calhoun, Messina, Cartier, and Torres, members of Integrated Substance Abuse Programs (ISAP) at UCLA, discovered that incarcerated women expressed interest in learning the reasons for their drug use, specifically how their familial relationships and childhood traumas impacted their substance abuse, as they feel this allows them to understand and better control the root of their addiction. In addition, studies have shown that these women often benefit from trauma-informed interventions. These treatments show improvements in reducing symptoms of trauma and PTSD along with positive impacts on substance abuse. GRT has successfully controlled the presence of trauma and its association with substance use.

=== Health ===
A constant topic in gender responsive prisons discusses the role mental has within gender responsive prisons. Studies addressing the mental health process of women have determined that at least 60% of women in state prison have disclosed going through some sort of physical or sexual abuse. These statistics provide a foundation for individuals in support of gender-responsive prisons in presenting that individuals are faced with different forms of abuse in the prison system. Rates of substance abuse disorders, mental illness, and sexually transmitted infections (STIs) are higher among incarcerated women than in incarcerated men. In addition, the majority of incarcerated women are younger than 45 years old, signifying that they have specific reproductive healthcare needs. Incarcerated women have higher rates of gynecological conditions than non-incarcerated women, which have been linked to chronic stress that surrounds their lifestyles. This stress may be the result of unstable housing, poverty, trauma, etc. These women are also at a higher risk for cervical and breast cancer likely due to a lack of screening both while they are in prison and before they are arrested.

Studies have shown that women tend to use drugs as a form of self-medication for depression and anxiety, which result from traumatic childhood and adolescent experiences. Saxena and Messina, Ph.D. scholars in the Integrated Substance Abuse Programs (ISAP) at UCLA, and Christine Grella, a professor for ISAP, argue that gender-responsive treatment's (GRT) multimodal approach allows for inclusivity in which the monolithic Therapeutic Community (TC) treatment lacks.

Another topic in gender responsive prisons is the healthcare and wellbeing of pregnant women who are incarcerated. At any given point in time, between 6-10% of incarcerated women are pregnant. Most of these pregnancies are considered high risk due to the physical and emotional disparities faced in prison. In many states, there exists a substandard care for pregnant incarcerated women. These gaps in healthcare include gaps in both maternal and neonatal care, including maternal and fetal health assessment, neonatal care and mental care. In most states, rest recommendations for the mother are not met or are instead compromised by other factors. There is also evidence that nutritional recommendations for a healthy pregnancy are not met by the meals provided by prison systems, suggesting that these pregnancies often go hand-in-hand with malnutrition. Lower bunks that allow better accessibility to these women are often not provided, and mental support and education is minimal. Along with these, there exists a practice that occurs among pregnant prisoners during childbirth known as “shackling,” which refers to the use of “any physical restrain or mechanical device [used] to control the movement of a prisoner’s body or limbs, including handcuffs, leg shackles, and belly chains”. These restraints pose risks both during and after the delivery of a baby, as they interfere with the ability to detect and treat complications. According to a 2017 study, 17.4% of facilities require the women to be handcuffed or shacked during delivery, and 56.7% of facilities shackle or restrain women hours after delivery. In addition to the health risks they pose, many find shackling to be a cruelty, even if the mother is a criminal. Often, it is seen by many as a form of abuse and a cause for trauma with incarcerated mothers. Restraining mothers is also seen by many, especially those outside of the United States, as unnecessary in addition to being cruel. However, many believe that restraints are necessary to prevent female prisoners from harming themselves or others or escaping. Twenty-four states have moved towards abolishing shackling or limiting their practical application, with the remaining states having no restrictions on its use. These findings indicate that there exists a healthcare gap among pregnant women that may be resolved by gender-responsive prisons.

=== Abolitionist approaches ===
Advocates of prison reform suggest that the current criminal justice system does not prevent criminal activity and is therefore broken. Abolitionists, on the other hand, argue that the system is not "broken," but rather is working perfectly by its own logic of a system that is racist, classist, homophobic, etc.

Abolitionists seek to shift discussions surrounding gender-responsive prisons toward their existence as reformist reforms. By sanitizing the appearance and rhetoric of the prison, gender-responsiveness programs allow the carceral state to achieve greater sustainability by supporting violence, criminalization, and deportation. Reforming the criminal justice system leaves unadressed systemic issues such as poverty and inaccessibility to healthcare or education. Therefore, abolitionists affirm using transformative justice to reimagine a world that does not support incarceration including surveillance, deportation and detention centers, criminalization, and violence.

Abolitionists critical of gender-responsive prisons specifically contend that the use of gender-responsive prison programs propagates the myth of individual rehabilitation, and that it takes what it, in essence, structural inequality and transforms it into a problem with a prison focused solution. Abolitionist Bree Carlton expands on her criticism of gender-responsive programs in her article "Pathways, Race and Gender Responsive Reform: Through an Abolitionist Lens". She takes a four-stage approach to addressing the problem of gender-responsive programs specifically in Victoria, Australia; these four stages include: addressing the significance of the adoption of the 'pathways approach' and its use of the rehabilitation defense of prisons, discussing the constructions of race and culture in gender responsive discourses, acknowledging the disproportionate number of Vietnamese women incarcerated in Victoria and the racialized implications of the 'pathways approach,' and finally a reflection on the issue of prison reform.

== See also ==
- Gender responsive approach for girls in the juvenile justice system
- Gender-specific prison programming in the United States
- Incarceration of women
- Category:Women's prisons
- Prison abolition movement
- Prison reform
- Critical race theory
- Prison–industrial complex
- Carceral feminism
- Sex differences in crime
