= Gender responsive approach for girls in the juvenile justice system =

Gender responsive approach for girls in the juvenile justice system represents an emerging trend in communities and courts throughout the United States, Australia and Latin America, as an increasing number of girls are entering the juvenile justice system. A gender responsive approach within the juvenile justice system emphasizes considering the unique circumstances and needs of females when designing juvenile justice system structures, policies, and procedures.

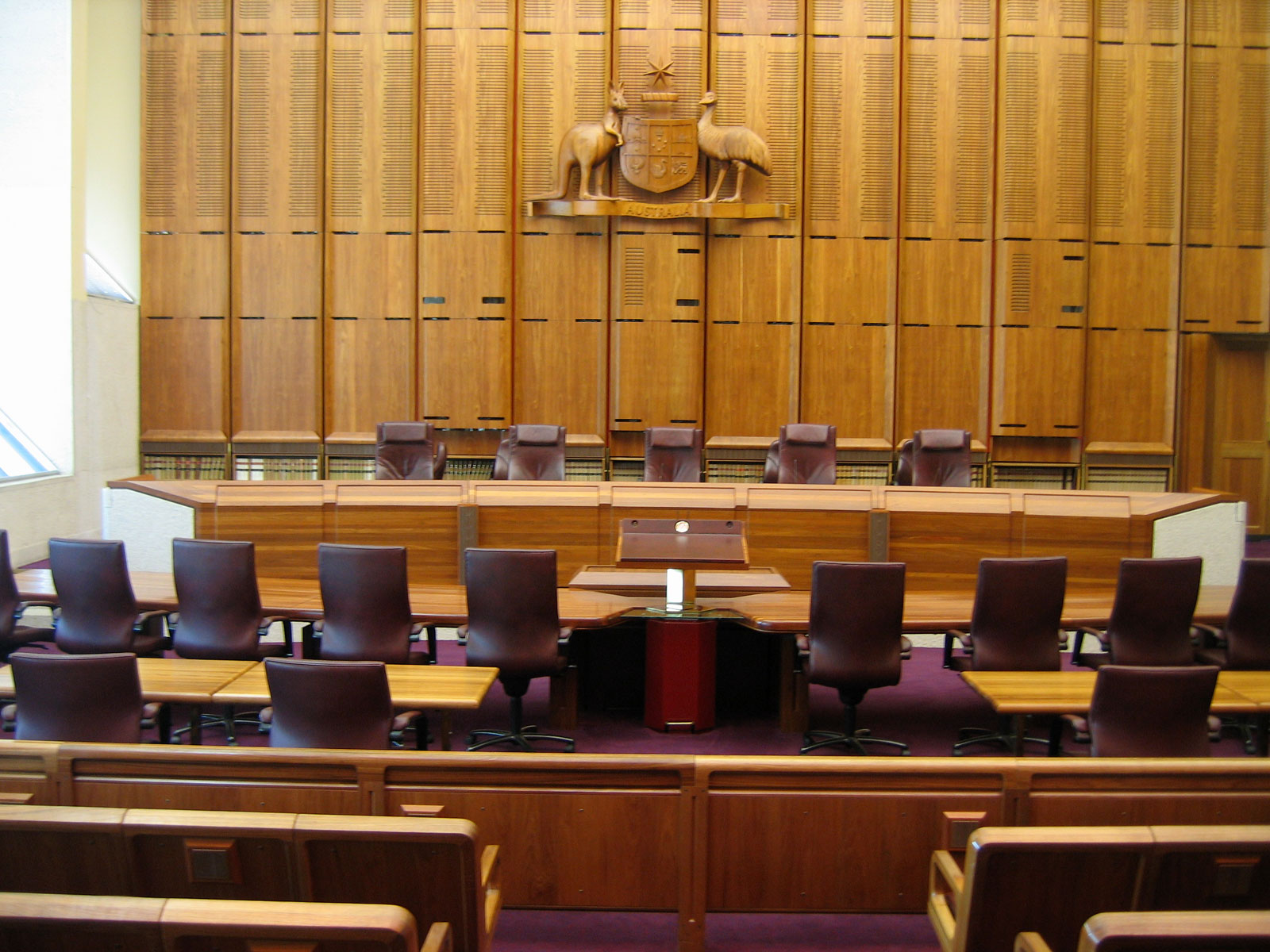
High court of Australia

== Circumstances to be considered ==
A new approach to juvenile justice or juvenile delinquency for females is to factor in the idea that they have different experiences than males. Girls who have negative childhood experiences, such as neglect, physical or sexual abuse, are at a greater risk to become delinquent (Violence in the Juvenile Justice system). Girls have higher rates of mental health issues such as anger, depression, suicidal thinking, victimization, violence, and abuse than boys. They also have a different reaction in society to behaviors that they may be participating in. Juvenile female offenders are often "low risk" and "high needs". These factors exclusive to girls make gender specific responses appropriate and needed.

=== Gender trends in system entry ===
Girls are now the fastest growing segment of Juvenile Justice population. In the United States from 1991 to 2000, the number of arrests of juvenile girls increased at a faster rate than the arrest rate for boys as a general trend. In areas where arrests numbers for boys and girls decreased, the rate for girls decreased less rapidly, indicating differential trends by gender. From 1985 to 2009, the overall number of delinquent crimes committed by juvenile girls increased by 86% while it increased by only 17% of juvenile boys in the U.S. A 2015 report by the Georgetown Law Center on Poverty and Inequality and the Human Rights Project for Girls provided statistics on the number of girls entering the juvenile justice system in the United States by race. Girls of color were disproportionately represented in the juvenile justice system. 123 per 100,000 African-American girls were in residential placement compared with 47 per 100,000 Latinas, 179 per 100,000 Native American girls, and 37 per 100,000 non-Hispanic white girls. There is not evidence that these trends are the result of increases in crime rate by girls in the United States, and researchers have attributed the increasing arrest rate for girls to changes in sentencing practices. Potential reasons for the increase in arrest rate of juvenile girls suggested by the Girls Study Group of the U.S. Department of Justice's Office of Juvenile Justice include changes in enforcement for non-serious, status offenses, which are the charges most commonly brought against girls. These types of offences, which are described as status or minor offenses, include but are not limited to running away from home, shoplifting, family abuse, truancy, drug offenses and prostitution. Many of these behaviors are deemed to be survival behaviors meaning that they are behaviors used to survive abuse or neglectful situations.

Human trafficking is one of the causes of prostitution charges and is handled in gender specific courts as a victimization crime. In Texas the Supreme Court ruled that girls younger than 14 years old involved in prostitution should be considered victims and provided services without criminalization.

=== "The Sexual Abuse to Prison Pipeline" ===
Georgetown Law Center on Poverty and Inequality published a report in 2015 synthesizing research on juvenile justice system involvement of girls in the U.S. and articulated a cycle of systems-involvement, described as the "Sexual Abuse to Prison Pipeline". Prior to becoming involved in the juvenile justice system, there is evidence that girls experience higher rates of trauma and sexual abuse than system-involved boys. For example, in a study of 64,329 juvenile offenders in Florida, Baglivio et al. found that these offenders had experienced high numbers of "adverse childhood experiences". These experiences differed by gender. 31% of the girls in the study had experienced childhood sexual abuse, while only 7% of boys had. 45% of the girls and 24% of boys had experienced five or more Adverse Childhood experiences. Additionally, research has indicated that girls who experience trauma are more likely than boys to develop mental health conditions. Research has not established a causal link between trauma exposure and delinquent behavior, but has established a correlation. For example, research by Smith et al. on adolescent girls in Oregon's juvenile justice system found that sexual abuse, but not physical abuse or lifetime trauma, were significantly associated with substance use. The differential rate of and response to trauma exposure by gender has therefore been identified as an explanation for the disproportionate entry of girls into the juvenile justice system. In this theory, behaviors that are coping mechanisms for trauma experienced by girls, such as alcohol and drug use, and status offenses such as running away from home or shoplifting, are criminalized, leading to their system involvement.

Girls in the United States enter a Juvenile Justice System that was initially formed in a manner intended to cater to predominately male offenders. Assessment tools used by most institutions were designed for this use. Additionally, research has estimated that between 67 and 90% of youth in juvenile detention facilities have at least one mental health diagnosis, and that PTSD rates among youth in these facilities may be as much as 10–15 times higher than in the general population. However, as of 2007, less than 2% of juvenile justice residential facilities in the U.S. were accredited by the National Commission on Correctional Health Care for facility medical and mental health care. Research indicates a lack of programming for girls has been an ongoing issue for several decades. A review of delinquency prevention programs across the country found 433 identified programs out of the number 2% were designed for girls. The mismatch between the system's design and the unique needs and experiences of girls has been identified as particularly problematic given the prevalence of sexual abuse and trauma history among systems-involved girls. National surveys conducted by the Office of Juvenile Justice and Delinquency Prevention have found insufficient health and trauma-related services for girls in residential detention centers. For example, only 18% of juvenile justice facilities provided pregnancy testing upon entry to the facility. For girls who have experienced trauma, status quo procedures within detention facilities, such as shackling, isolation, strip searches, and lack of access to comprehensive health and hygiene statuses can re-trigger trauma experiences and responses.

Beyond establishing differing rates of childhood sexual abuse and trauma exposure among juvenile justice-involved youth by gender, research has indicated that the link between childhood sexual abuse and recidivism varies by gender. Research by Conrad et al. on males and females in the Northeast United States from 2006 to 2008 found that gender alone did not predict recidivism rates for juvenile-justice involved youth. However, for girls only, childhood sexual abuse exposure was the only significant predictor of recidivism, with sexually abused girls being five times as likely to re-offend when compared to girls who had not been sexually abused. This along with other research has led many academics, systems administrators, and policymakers to focus on the importance of childhood sexual abuse, specifically on the role this abuse plays in increasing the likelihood that girls will be involved in the juvenile justice system, will be re-traumatized by experiences within the system, and will be more likely to recidivate and continue a cycle of criminal justice involvement.

Research has shown that juvenile-justice involved youth who have been sexually abused are at increased risk for being victims of human trafficking. In a study by Reid et al. (2017) examining the prevalence of adverse childhood experiences among boys and girls in the juvenile justice system in Florida who were reported as victims of human trafficking between 2009 and 2015, sexual abuse history was determined to be the strongest factor predicting likelihood of human trafficking victimization. While sex trafficking by minors under age 18 has been decriminalized in many states, with young participants being treated as victims, participation in sex trafficking increases the likelihood of an individual being involved in the juvenile or adult criminal justice system.

== History of gender responsiveness ==
=== United States ===
The 1992 reauthorization of the Juvenile Justice and Delinquency Prevention Act included an amendment that instructed state juvenile justice systems to assess their gender responsiveness and provide gender-appropriate services in order to qualify for federal formula dollars. This was the first time that the JJDP act explicitly focused on the needs of juvenile females and ultimately led to increased attention on a state-level to gender bias assessments and gender responsive policy development and implementation.

== Gender responsive treatment components ==
Gender responsive treatment approaches can be utilized across the continuum of care for juvenile-justice system involved girls. Responses designed to cater to females include collaboration by courts, lawyers, probation, human services, community programming, and federal and local governments. The goal of collaboration is to address the needs of girls and consider the big picture of what the problems are. Female staff are used in an effort to address relationships and provide positive female role models for girls. Services that may be provided or encouraged range from keeping the girl in her home and providing family support and counseling, conflict resolution, education and life skills, pregnancy prevention, parenting, domestic violence and empowerment.

Research conducted by Walker et al. on gender responsive practices in the juvenile justice system identified several core areas in which gender responsive practices are being implemented in several jurisdictions in the United States. These include screening and assessment practices, family engagement, emphasizing a relational approach, safety, skills and strengths-based approach, and reentry and community connections. Walker et al. surveyed state and county-level juvenile justice providers in 10 states and conducted in-person assessments to identify how these gender responsive approaches in these areas are implemented. Respondents indicated that in screening and assessment upon intake to the juvenile justice system, placing an emphasis on assessments that are individualized, screening for trauma, connecting assessments to treatment and aftercare planning, and utilizing validated risk assessment tools were crucial to a gender-responsive approach. After the intake and assessment process, respondents highlighted the importance of engaging families in the provision of juvenile justice services. This included efforts to remove barriers to families, such as through the placement of a girl in the facility located closest to her family, which allows for connection between child and family throughout the detention process. In treatment approaches, some respondents reported utilizing skills-based and strengths-based approaches, and treatments that were trauma-informed, including dialectical behavior therapy. Some reported developing policies that emphasized a relational approach, focusing on helping girls in the juvenile justice system build and maintain healthy, supportive relationships, and that these jurisdictions viewed this approach as being especially crucial to supporting girls. Another area highlighted by many respondents within the area of treatment was the importance of safety to a gender responsive approach. This could include crisis-intervention training, limiting physical contact between staff and girls, and utilizing female staff in female facilities. Finally, providers reported emphasizing planning for girls re-entry into the community throughout the time girls are in residential facilities. This could be through approaches in which girls work with the same social worker during and after staying in a residential facility, or working with girls to identify and access supportive resources and individuals within their communities. Staff reported the importance of considering prevalence of sexual abuse when developing policies and practices for girls, on emphasizing diversity among girls and resisting stereotyping, and on planning for successful re-entry.

=== Effectiveness ===
As some jurisdictions have begun implementing gender-responsive approaches in their juvenile justice system, it has been difficult to conduct the caliber of quantitative research necessary to establish an evidence base on the effectiveness of these approaches. This is due to the small number of girls within a given juvenile justice system who would be exposed to new programs or policies and the challenges this poses for statistically rigorous study designs. In one qualitative analysis by Hodge et al., county juvenile court staff were interviewed to determine if gender-responsive programming was meeting its intended goal. In these interviews staff reported substantial efforts to implement these approaches, as well as significant need to improve staff training and address gendered norms and stereotypes. Analysis of preliminary results of the evaluation the Project Kealahou program in Hawaii indicated that girls in the program demonstrated improvements across multiple outcomes. Researchers Suarez et al. suggested that these improvements may be due to the program's focus on intensive, peer-delivered supports within the community, and highlighted the relatively low cost of providing these services.

As of 2017, an evaluation conducted by MDRC is underway of the PACE Center for Girls program in Florida, with anticipated release of a final report for 2018. The PACE Center for Girls program is a gender-responsive program serving girls ages 11–17. The MDRC study will utilize a random assignment evaluation design to analyze the effectiveness of the program in mitigating negative outcomes and promoting positive outcomes for girls in the program, with stated goal of adding to the establishment of a statistically rigorous evidence-base on the effectiveness of gender-responsive programs.

== Examples in programs ==
Many communities are using programs that recognize girls' gender as a component in their juvenile justice programs. These programs aim to address the unique needs of girls by providing a variety of services. Many have gendered risk assessments that occur immediately upon entry into the justice system.

=== United States ===
Girl's court (Growing Independence Restoring Lives) offers a variety of programs in the United States. The courts identify girls that have traumatic life events and seeks to address underlying problems that may cause crimes. Some communities chose to view the girl as a child in need of assistance. Services vary from immediate attention and clinical intervention, addressing gender specific issues, to acknowledging unique needs and differences. Many of the courts seek to have a supportive adult from the girl's life to participate.

In February, 2017, the Vera Institute of Justice started a multi-agency task force, "Task Force on Ending Girls' Incarceration in New York City" in partnership with New York City. The task force will focus on identifying and developing a plan to interrupt the unique pathways that bring teenage girls into the city's criminal justice system.

One community has begun using the restorative justice process to handle issues related to girls. They decided that they were ill-equipped to handle the complex and interrelated problems of abuse, prostitution and drug use and the effects on girls. The program serves as an instructive example of a recent innovation, demonstrating that when the vision of restorative gender-responsive programming is most fully actualized, it provides tremendous benefits to girls involved in the justice system.

=== International ===
Reparations for girl child soldiers are handled with gender specific treatment in a variety of war torn countries. Columbia, South Africa, Peru and the United Nations identify the need to respond to the needs of girls. "They must aim to address the political and structural inequalities that negatively shape the lives of girls". The courts have acknowledged that girl soldiers face different circumstances than boy soldiers because girls are recruited for sexual purposes and may be forced to marry and have children with their captors. They are frequently exposed to sexual violence and may be forced into domestic positions. Providing gender specific care to girls has enabled the courts to use its power as a tool for transformation, allowing girls to become empowered in the process.

Australian juvenile court recognizes the need to treat young women offenders with gender specific services. These specific services are away from male offenders. The services offered vary by location from health and wellbeing, relationships, education and training and other programs like cooking and following the law.

== See also ==
- Gender-responsive prisons
- Gender-specific prison programming in the United States
- Incarceration of women
- Sex differences in crime
