= Roach v Electoral Commissioner =

Judgement of the Australian High Court

- Court: High Court of Australia
- Full case name: Vickie Lee Roach v Electoral Commissioner & Commonwealth of Australia
- Decided: 30 August 2007 (order); 26 September 2007 (reasons)
- Citations: [2007] HCA 43, (2007) 233 CLR 162
- Transcripts: 28 Mar [2007] HCATrans 122; 2 May [2007] HCATrans 187; 5 Jun [2007] HCATrans 273; 12 Jun [2007] HCATrans 275; 13 Jun [2007] HCATrans 276; 30 Aug [2007] HCATrans 467

Court membership
- Judges sitting: Gleeson CJ, Gummow, Kirby, Hayne, Heydon & Crennan JJ

Case opinions
- (4:2) 2006 legislation disenfranchising all prisoners was invalid, the 3-year criterion in the 2004 legislation was valid. (per Gleeson CJ, Gummow, Kirby & Crennan JJ)

Roach v Electoral Commissioner is a High Court of Australia case, decided in 2007, dealing with the validity of Commonwealth legislation that prevented prisoners from voting. The Court held that the 2006 amendments were inconsistent with the system of representative democracy established by the Constitution. Voting in elections lies at the heart of that system of representative government, and disenfranchisement of a group of adult citizens without a substantial reason would not be consistent with it. The three-year criterion in the 2004 amendments was held to be valid as it sufficiently distinguished between serious lawlessness and less serious but still reprehensible conduct.

== Background ==
Vicki Lee Roach was a Victorian woman of Aboriginal descent, who was serving a six-year term of imprisonment at the Dame Phyllis Frost Centre in Deer Park. She was a heroin addict who had first been imprisoned at the age of 17. In 2002, Roach and her then partner robbed a milk bar. She was driving the getaway car, being pursued by police, when she struck a car stopped at a traffic light, causing extensive injuries to the 21-year-old driver. Roach had alcohol, tranquilisers, morphine, and a cannabis-related substance in her blood and was subsequently convicted on five counts for offences of burglary, theft, conduct endangering persons, and negligently causing serious injury. On each count, she received a sentence of between 12 months and 3 years, with a total effective sentence of six years and a non-parole period of 4 years.

Roach's court challenge was facilitated by the Human Rights Law Centre in Melbourne, which organised a "sizeable team of pro bono lawyers" led by Ron Merkel QC, a former judge of the Federal Court of Australia, and featuring many lawyers from Allens. The arguments included that indigenous Australians were disproportionately disqualified from voting, as indigenous Australians are only 2.5% of the population, but constitute more than a quarter of the national prison population.

== Decision ==
Chief Justice Murray Gleeson held that the right to vote was constitutionally protected. Universal suffrage was long established; anything less was not a choice by the people as required by sections 7 and 24 of the Constitution.

Removing the right to vote for serious misconduct was acceptable (hence the previous legislation was valid); however, imprisonment failed as a method of identifying serious criminal misconduct when looking at short-term sentences. These sentences tended to be imposed for arbitrary reasons, such as location or homelessness, that were unrelated to the seriousness of the offence.

Justices William Gummow, Michael Kirby, and Susan Crennan decided the validity of the legislation by applying an "appropriate and adapted" test similar to the second limb of the Lange test respecting freedom of political communication. The arbitrary reasons for imposing, or not imposing, short terms of imprisonment mentioned by Gleeson were used to support this conclusion.

The Court published its orders on 30 August 2007, to ensure people could be enrolled to vote in the 2007 election, and published its reasons on 26 September 2007.

In other words, Roach had won the case and prisoners were allowed to vote in elections but only if they have a sentence below a certain amount of time. Even though Roach won the case she was still not able to vote due to the length of her sentence.

== Aftermath ==
While imprisoned Roach completed a master's degree in creative writing. After her release she became an advocate for prison abolition.

Roach's efforts were chronicled in the 2009 short documentary film This Is How You'll Make Your Bed In Prison, written, directed and edited by Victorian College of the Arts student Katie Mitchell.

== See also ==
- Australian constitutional law
