= Girl's court =

Gender responsive approach for girls

A girl's court is a gender responsive approach for girls in the juvenile justice system that links young "at-risk" females to social service agencies, providing informal sessions on everything from body image, education and counseling with a team of adults to provide trust and support.

Some half dozen such courts have emerged around the United States, each defining itself around the problems in the surrounding area. One common theme is to treat young sex workers as the victims of sex trafficking. Identifying reasons for entry into these behaviors such as childhood abuse and dysfunctional homes is important to understanding the nature of the crime and circumstances unique to girls.

== United States ==
=== California ===
The Orange County Girls court started in 2009. It focuses teenage girls in long-term foster care, with preliminary studies suggesting better grades and fewer placements.

The Alameda County Girls Court handles young women who have been recruited as child prostitutes or are considered at risk for involvement. It was founded in 2011 and carved out of the existing juvenile court. A 2013 survey of 113 sexually exploited youths by WestCoast Children's Clinic found that 75 percent of such youngsters there and in a neighboring county had experienced abuse and neglect. For example, one girl was found passed out on the street, having injected drugs she could not identify. Another, whose mother, a methamphetamine addict, "sold" her daughter to an uncle who sexually exploited her in exchange for drugs. The county's H.E.A.T. Watch unit, started by the district attorney in 2006, targets people who traffic in women: as of 2013, 111 exploiters of children under 18 had been convicted. Most girls attend residential treatment programs out of state. Many are re-exploited after returning.

In Los Angeles County, a sex trafficking court diverts girls to local foster care agencies and social service providers, while the probation department now has a dedicated unit to support young victims.

=== Florida ===
In Florida, Circuit 4 Girls Court is a specialized form of juvenile court that assists in linking young "at risk" females to community resources, social service agencies, mentors and offers a holistic team approach. The young ladies are provided tools to be successful in the community. Girls Court is a collaboration between Department of Juvenile Justice, Family Support Services, the Fourth Judicial Circuit, the Delores Barr Weaver Policy Center and many more valuable community providers. Florida has two courts; one is in Jacksonville and the other in Pinellas County.

=== Michigan ===
Michigan has a girl's court in Genesee, which was started by Judge David Newblatt of the Genesee County 7th Circuit Court. It applies to all girls under 18. It provides girls with resources and counseling.

=== Hawaii ===
The court in Hawaii is a program where both parents and girls attend counseling for a year. It led to a marked decrease in detentions, according to a 2011 evaluation. A related program, Project Kealahou, emphasized services such as peer mentoring and repairing family relationships, leading, in 2022, resulted in zero girls in its youth correctional facilities.

=== Minnesota ===
In 2015, sexually exploited minors in Minnesota will be referred to one of six regional case managers who will direct them to a network of emergency shelters.

=== New York ===
New York State has a new network of 11 statewide Human Trafficking Intervention Courts for those 16 years and up. New York State's Safe Harbor law, the country's first, classifies trafficked minors through age 17 as needing supervision rather than probation.

=== Oregon ===
Oregon revised its child welfare practice so that a trafficked minor is considered a victim of abuse and the province of the child welfare system rather than the courts.

=== Texas ===
The Texas Supreme Court ruled in 2010 that minors younger than 14 involved with prostitution charges will be considered a victim. The court decided that they would provide services without criminalization. The court created a half way house called Freedom House to provide a safe place for the young women to receive services such as school and counseling. Freedom House can house up to 30 girls, starting at 10 years old up to 18, and receive educational, medical and psychological care.

=== Wisconsin ===
In Wisconsin, a Milwaukee County Committee is considering a girl court that will be aimed at young women who are accused of sex trafficking. This will also include girls who experience trauma and are involved in status offense crimes. If they move forward with the court they plan to have one or more judges trained in handling these types of offenses.

== Australia ==
In Australia, the juvenile court provides gender specific services for young women charged with crimes. These specific services are away from male offenders. The services offered vary by location from health and wellbeing, relationships, education and training, and other programs like cooking and following the law. Australia recognizes the need to treat young women with gender specific services.

== Trends ==
Courts are creating a gender responsive approach for girls in the juvenile justice system. These courts look to address gendered issues for girls but do not yet have their own formal girls courts. They practice a variety of programs aimed at addressing gendered issues for girls in juvenile court.
