= Andrea Mohr =

German writer (born 1963)

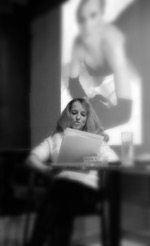
Andrea Mohr

Andrea Mohr (born July 19, 1963, in Neustadt, West Germany) is a German writer who writes in German and English. Mohr was previously involved in international drug smuggling and served a sentence from 1999 to 2004 in the high-security prison for women, the Dame Phyllis Frost Centre in Melbourne, Australia.

== Life ==
=== Prior to the detention ===
She attended primary school from 1969 to 1973 in Neustadt, Germany where she attended the Leibniz Gymnasium. She attended the English night school Inlingua in Mannheim, Germany from 1983 to 1984 as a foreign correspondent. This was followed by studies of economics in 1985–1986 at LMU Munich. From 1986 to 1989 she studied Japanese and American Studies at the Free University of Berlin.

In Tokyo, Bangkok, Los Angeles and Kyoto, she worked as a photo model and hostess, in Berlin in Cabarets as a striptease dancer. She lived in Berlin from 1986 to 1996, and then in Melbourne until her deportation in 2004.

=== Time in prison ===
She pleaded guilty to being knowingly concerned in the importation of 5.5 kilograms of cocaine by her ex-husband Werner Roberts; other co-accused were the well-known Melbourne lawyer Andrew Fraser and Carl Urbanec, her longtime German friend.

Andrea Mohr was sentenced to a maximum of 8 years, with a minimum of 5 years, and after serving 5 years she was deported back to Germany. Andrea had been married to Werner Roberts since 1997 and divorced him 2001. Werner Roberts was sentenced to 10 to 13 years in prison, Carl Urbanec 6 to 9 years and Andrew Fraser 5 to 7 years in prison.

Andrea Mohr spent her entire sentence in high-security prison, since she was a high-profile case involved in international crimes, deemed to be a high escape risk. During her prison time she completed a correspondence course at the Swinburne University of Technology, Melbourne, in the fields of journalism and creative writing.

== Post-prison career ==
Since 2004 she has authored several books. For the German publishing house Umschau Buchverlag she wrote the following culinary travel guides:

- Kulinarische Entdeckungsreise durch Niederösterreich (Culinary Journey of Discovery through Lower Austria)
- Eine Weinreise durch die Pfalz (A Wine Journey through the Palatinate)
- Trends und Lifestyle in Berlin.

Her autobiography Pixie was published in 2009 by Hardie Grant Books in Australia. Howard Marks wrote a quote for the book cover. A German translation of Pixie was published in 2011 by Egmont Publishing (VGS) .

In 2010 she started to present her show-and multi-media readings under the title This is not a Striptease, telling about her life. She is active for Amnesty International and fighting for better conditions within the prison system.

TV Show Locked UP Abroad National Geographic Broadcast Episode Dame of Cocaine Was released on Disney Plus at January 2023 telling Andrea Mohr's story
