= Incarceration of women =

Imprisonment of women

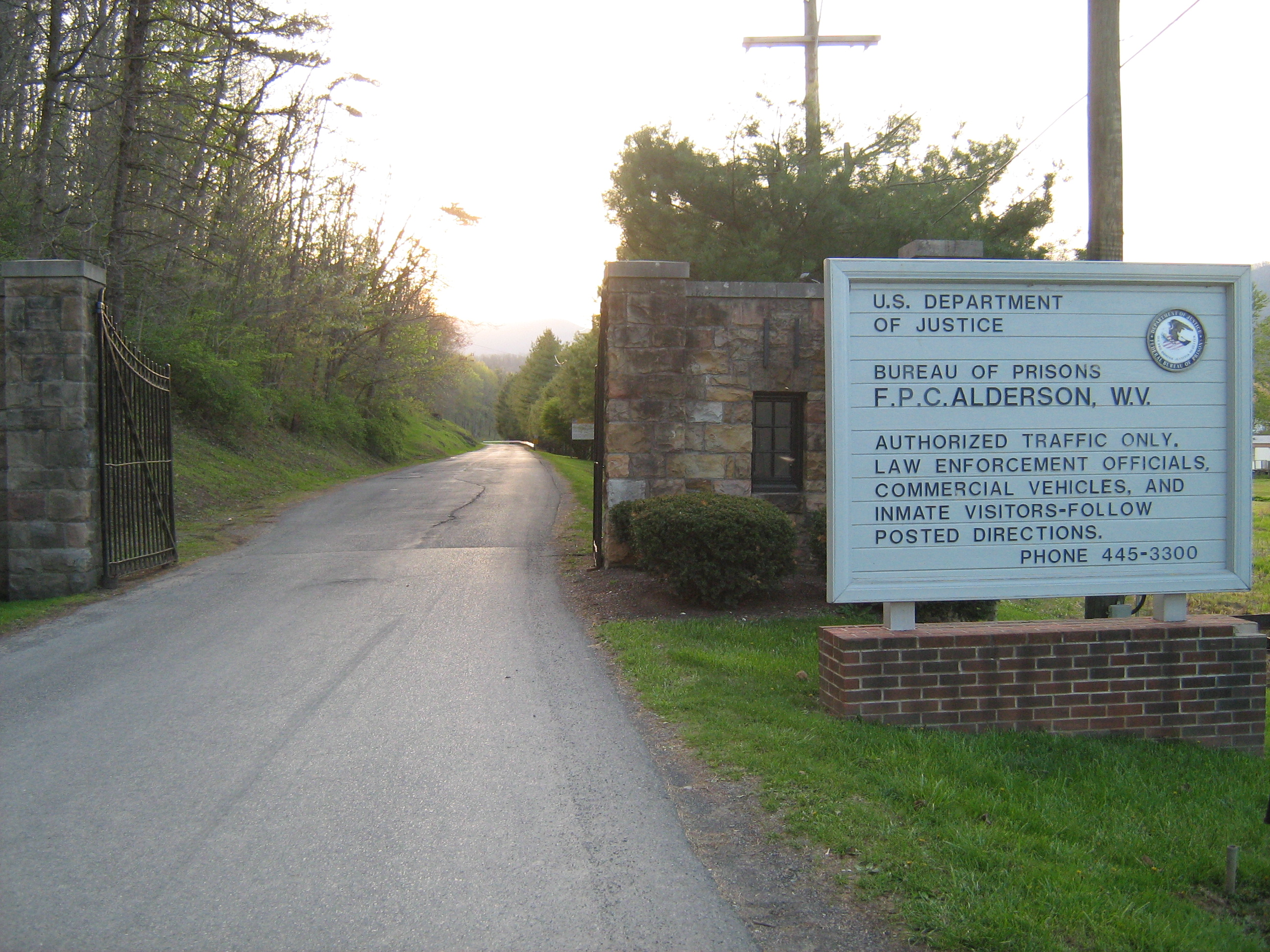
Federal Prison Camp, Alderson, a Federal Bureau of Prisons facility for women in West Virginia

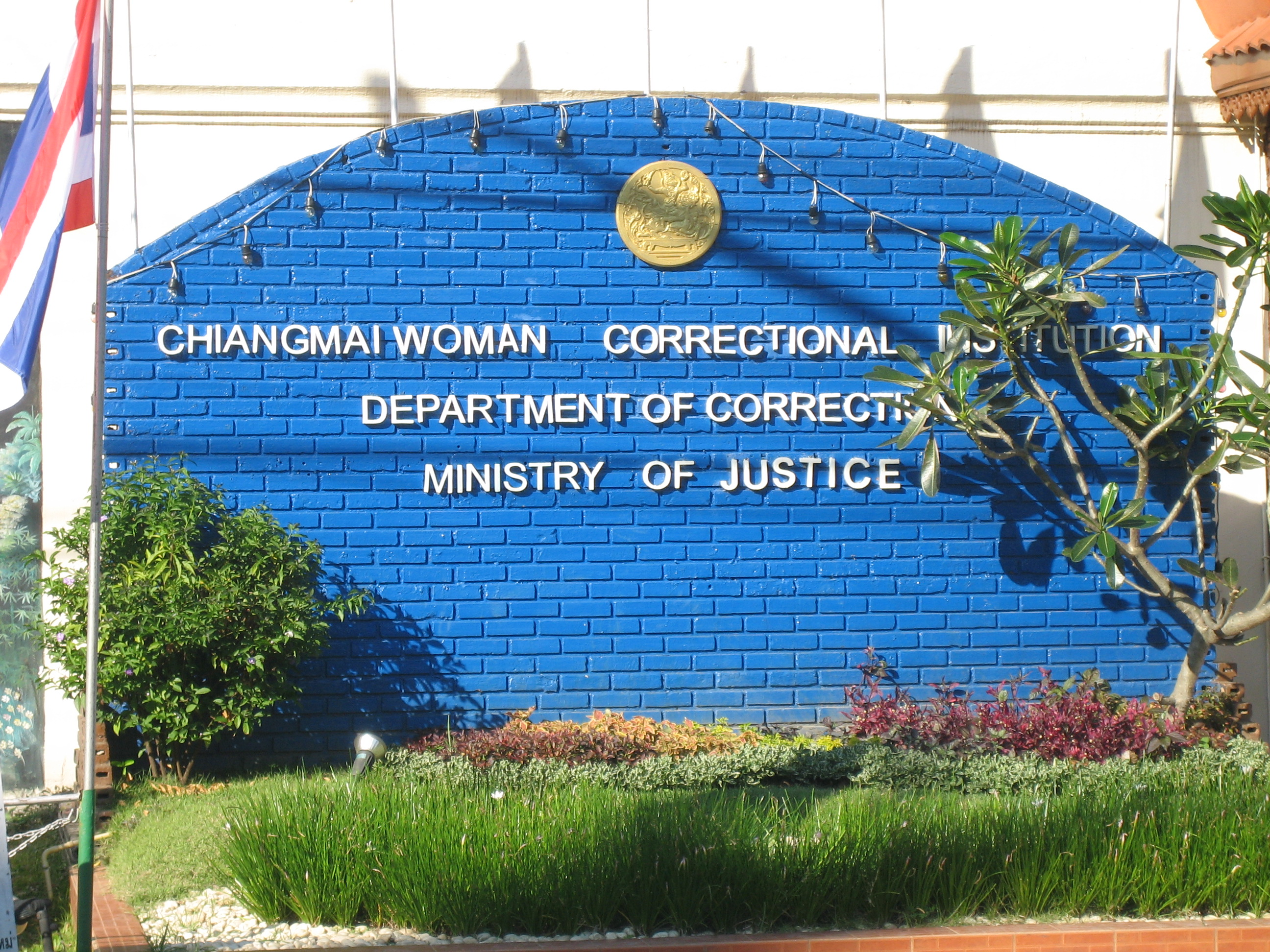
Chiang Mai Women's Correctional Institution of the Thai Department of Corrections, Chiang Mai, Thailand

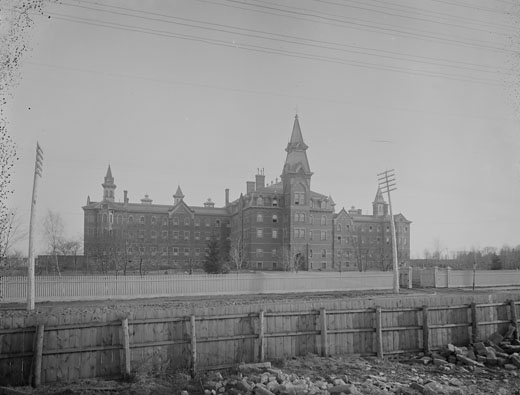
Andrew Mercer Reformatory for Women in Toronto, Ontario

Approximately 741,000 women are incarcerated in correctional facilities, a 17% increase since 2010 and the female prison population has been increasing across all continents. The list of countries by incarceration rate includes a main table with a column for the historical and current percentage of prisoners who are female.

== Prison population ==
Globally, the vast majority of incarcerated people are men. Incarcerated women have been and continue to be treated differently by criminal justice systems around the world at every step of the process, from arrest to sentencing, to punitive measures used. This disparity is largely due to tangible demographic differences between the severity of crimes committed by male and female prison populations, as well as a persistent belief by society at large that female criminals are better able to be rehabilitated than their male counterparts.

Although women form a minority in the global prison population, the population of incarcerated women is growing at a rate twice as fast as the male prison population. Those imprisoned in China, Russia, and the United States comprise the great majority of incarcerated people, including women, in the world. Trends observed in the global growth of the female prison population can be partly explained by evolving policies regarding the sentencing and parole of female inmates. As criminal justice systems across the world move towards gender-blind sentencing, this has resulted in a tremendous increase in the rate of female incarceration. Concurrent elimination of parole and toughening of penalties for parole violations in many areas of the world also contribute to high rates of re-entry and re-offending, further driving up rates of incarceration of women.

The United Nations Office on Drugs and Crime website hosts data regarding prison populations around the world, including "Persons held - by sex, by age group" and "Persons held - by status and sex".

== Social and political conditions leading to incarceration ==
International developments in the political response to social issues, specifically the global drug epidemic, have catalyzed many changes in the composition of the prison populations and, subsequently, the types of conditions prisoners experience while incarcerated. The war on drugs has accounted for the large population of female low-level offenders, usually imprisoned for narcotic use or possession. Western powers, particularly the United States, have largely advocated for the global proliferation of the so-called "war on drugs".

While there is no globally uniform representation among female prisoners in terms of the types of crimes they are imprisoned for, it is widely acknowledged that there are a number of underlying social inequities which make affected women disproportionately more likely to commit crimes and therefore become incarcerated. The most prominent of these conditions is poverty, as well as the conditions that give rise to poverty. Globally, women in poor households tend to bear a disproportionate amount of work related to caring for the household, feeding the family, and educating the children. This is in tandem with educational inequalities, pay gaps, pregnancy, and heightened rates of physical and domestic abuses. Another inequity deemed partially culpable for the rate at which impoverished women, in particular, are incarcerated due to the lack of access to mental health care. Many incarcerated women suffer from mental illnesses, and their incarceration can be directly linked to an absence of treatment for their conditions.

Research has shown a significant link between females in prison and brain injury, which supports research that shows incarcerated females are overwhelmingly victims of domestic violence (male violence against women).

== Prison conditions ==
Early facilities were considered inhumane with little regard for health and safety. Men and women were housed in a large room where the strong preyed on the weak. As of 1964, in most of the Western world, the guards in female prisons are no longer exclusively female. As of that year, both men and women work as guards in women's prisons in the United States. However, some states have laws requiring female officers as well as a female superintendent. While most states have only one or two institutions for women, some facilities are considered "unisex" and house both male and female inmates in separate areas.

There is massive variation in the quality of living standards both between prisons around the world and between prisons within individual countries. Variations in national wealth, apportionment of national budgets and different approaches to criminal rehabilitation all contribute to the absence of uniformity in prison living standards. Other phenomena, such as the privatisation of prisons in many countries with large prison populations, such as the United States, also give rise to variability in the environmental quality of women's prisons. Once a corporation assumes governance over prison and its budget, the presiding government has relatively little oversight of the maintenance of prison standards and prisoner wellbeing. There are many ongoing political debates surrounding the continuation of private prisons.

Certain prison populations, including women, have special health needs which often go unmet. For example, one study in the journal Health and Social Care in the Community found that in England and Wales, which have the highest prison populations of any European countries, women's specific mental and physical health needs are under-researched and not sufficiently cared for, with 40% of female prisoners reporting long-term health problems in comparison with the male statistic of 33%.

== By jurisdiction ==
=== Great Britain ===
In Great Britain, in 1996 a new policy was passed, and women no longer have to be restrained while giving birth when serving their sentence. The British services for human rights and the United Nations standard minimum rules for the treatment of prisoners say that no one should be subjected to degrading punishment. Some prisoners refuse to go to childcare events or funerals because of the humiliation the restraints show. Women in Britain fought for their right to not be restrained while giving birth to their child, however, they must be restrained while being escorted to and from the hospital. More women than men try to escape the prison system in Britain. Of those women who escape almost half escape while receiving medical attention at a hospital.

=== Hong Kong ===
Circa 2017, according to the World Prisons Brief, women make up about 20.8% of Hong Kong's inmate population. Of any sovereign state or dependency, minus very small countries/microstates, Hong Kong, as of circa 2017, has the highest percentage of women in correctional supervision. In August 2017 the Hong Kong Correctional Services had 1,486 incarcerated women, and it had a total of 1,764 women under correctional supervision if the 279 on remand were included.

Hong Kong has a number of women-only institutions including Bauhinia House, Tai Lam Centre for Women, Chi Lan Rehabilitation Centre, Lai King Correctional Institution, Lo Wu Correctional Institution, Wai Lan Rehabilitation Centre, and Nei Kwu Correctional Institution.

=== Mainland China ===
In general, statistical information in regards to the rate of incarceration for women in China has been found difficult to compare to other countries around the world. However, some scholars argued in 2003 that approximately one-fifth of the total number of women in the United States would be equivalent to that of the total population of women incarcerated in China.

According to the International Centre for Prison Studies, as of August 2014, the Chinese women's prison population is the second-largest in the world (after the United States) with 84,600 female prisoners in total or 5.1% of the overall Chinese prison population.

Within the last decade, the rate of incarceration for women in China has increased by 46%. Women make up only 6% of the total population of individuals in prison within the country. While it is difficult to correctly evaluate the statistic regarding the total number of women incarcerated due to the underreporting of these cases, China is on track to imprison more women than the United States.

=== New Zealand ===
In New Zealand, there are three correctional facilities specifically for women. These include Auckland Region Women's Corrections Facility (ARWCF), Arohata Women's Prison, and Christchurch Women's Prison. At these facilities, women are offered various prisoner assistance programs while they are serving their sentences in prison. These consist of baby unit spaces for new mothers, mental and physical disability assistance, feeding and bonding facilities, cultural hobbies, and special food accommodations for dietary restrictions. While many of these activities are permission-based and evaluated with a case-by-case approach, the prisons have started offering these options to women who are incarcerated in recent years.

In New Zealand, the total number of convicted women increased by 111% between 1996 and 2005. In 1963, women made up 7.7% of those convicted in New Zealand's court system, with most causes of arrest being offences against property and some offences being crime against persons and/or assault. Then, in 1972, women's incarceration rates increased to 11% in lower court systems. Again, with mostly the same two leading convictions. As of 1996, prosecuted females on average had fewer previous convictions than prosecuted males in most first world countries such as New Zealand. The number of women incarcerated in New Zealand peaked in 2010 and has decreased since. As of 2014, the female conviction percentage is up to 23%. Crimes against property make up a higher percentage of the total 23% female conviction ratio, at 33%. According to a 1991 study published by the Department of Justice, Greg Newbold notes that in comparison to women, men were twice as likely to commit a more serious crime.

Although the number of males far outweighs the number of females in the correctional facilities of New Zealand, the rate of increase of women incarcerated is growing at a pace significantly higher than that of males. Overall, the incarceration rate of women has been growing all over the world, not just in New Zealand. The most recent advocated hypothesis regarding why the rise is occurring is that women's crime rates are not increasing, rather the criminal justice system is changing. This change has led to an increase in attention to minor offences, which women are statistically more likely to commit. Gill McIvor, Professor of Criminology at the University of Stirling, supports this hypothesis with research published in 2010 which confirms that the rise of female incarceration rates in New Zealand is not due to the increasing severity of crimes committed by women. As well as this, McIvor also makes the claim that New Zealand women are overrepresented in less serious types of crimes such as theft and fraud and underrepresented in more serious types of crime such as crimes of violence.

According to statistics released in September 2025 by the New Zealand Department of Corrections, women prisoners account for 7.7% of the total prison population in the country. The most commonly committed offences among women include illicit drug offences, theft and related offences, fraud and related offences, and robbery, extortion and related offences. Three of these four categories saw an increase of 60%, however, the lowest category (illicit drug offences) saw the smallest increase at 40%.

=== Russia ===
As of March 1, 2012, the Russian Criminal Justice system housed about 60,500 women, 8.1% of the total number of people incarcerated in the country. Russia has been slow to implement reform for the rights of its incarcerated population, especially for women. Russia has some criminal laws that contain articles that govern the treatment and status of women in the criminal justice system; however, with the exception of a law preventing women from receiving the death penalty, these laws are mostly limited to the status of incarcerated women as child bearers and seem to focus more on the status and rights of children incarcerated with their mothers. For instance, if a woman is pregnant or has a child under fourteen years old, her sentence has the potential to be postponed, reduced, or cancelled. Additionally, women in prison with their children are entitled to “improved living conditions, specialised medical services, and more rations and clothing”. As for the women that do not have children, they face overcrowded conditions and inadequate medical care. Furthermore, women are often brought through transit prisons on what could be a two-month journey to their final destination, regardless of where the final destination is actually located.

=== United States ===
In the United States, authorities began housing women in correctional facilities separate from men in the 1870s. The first American female correctional facility with dedicated buildings and staff was the Mount Pleasant Female Prison in Ossining, New York; the facility had some operational dependence on nearby Sing Sing, a men's prison. In the 1930s, 34 women's prisons were built, by 1990 there were 71 women's prisons in the country, but only five years later there were 150 (Chesney-Lind, 1998:66).

Unlike prisons designed for men in the United States, state prisons for women evolved in three waves, as described in historical detail in Partial Justice: Women in State Prisons by Nicole Hahn Rafter. First, women prisoners were imprisoned alongside men in the "general population," where they were subject to sexual attacks and daily forms of degradation. Then, in a partial attempt to address these issues, women prisoners were removed from the general population and housed separately, but then subject to neglect wherein they did not receive the same resources as men in prisons. In the third stage of development, women in prison were then housed completely separately in fortress-like prisons, where the goal of punishment was to indoctrinate women into traditionally feminine roles.

According to an article published in 2018 from The Prison Policy Initiative, of the world's female population only 4% live in the U.S.; however, over 30% of the world's incarcerated women are in the United States.

The Prisoners in 2014 report by the Bureau of Justice Statistics determined that Black women make up 23% of incarcerated women in the United States. Black women comprise about 14% of the U.S. female population and because corrections agencies do not separate prisoner data by race and gender, “we rarely know how many of the black prisoners are women, and how many of the women are Black”.

There are currently 23 states that do not have any law protecting against the shackling of pregnant incarcerated women. This contravenes the United Nations Rules for the Treatment of Women Prisoners and Non-custodial Measures for Women Offenders, that explicitly states that “instruments of restraint shall never be used on women during labor, during birth and immediately after birth.” There is a distinction between shackling during pregnancy, delivery, and postpartum. While some states, such as Maryland and New York banned all restraints immediately before and after giving birth, others banned shackling during active delivery, but permit it immediately before and after. Currently, the only state giving a private right of action for women illegally shackled is Rhode Island.

When pregnant women are shackled, the restraints are entirely controlled by the prison guards, not the medical staff. These methods of shackling have been greatly denounced for the effects they have on both the mother and the fetus. A 2016 study revealed that shackles create unique safety risks, notably "potential injury or placental abruption caused by falls, delayed progress of labor caused by impaired mobility, and delayed receipts of emergency care when corrections officers must remove shackles to allow for assessment of intervention". Furthermore, being shackled can cause trauma, or exacerbate already existing trauma and post-traumatic experience symptoms. While shackles are justified as necessary to prevent flight risk or a potential to cause harm to others, medical experts have confirmed that there is an extremely low risk of imminent harm or escape when safer means are used, such as de-escalation tactics.

Despite the advocacy for legislation banning this practice, and despite the already existing legislative limits, medical staff and inmates have denounced that shackling during pregnancy and post-partum continues. The federal government does not mandate the collection of data regarding pregnancy and childbirth amongst female inmates. Therefore, it is unknown how common these practices remain, and how they occur.

Activists have also denounced other issues related to pregnancy and birthing for incarcerated women. In the podcast Beyond Prison, Maya Schenwar, an American journalist and author, shared the experience of her sister who gave birth while incarcerated. For weeks prior to giving birth, her sister suffered from many pregnancy related health issues, including bleeding for weeks. She wasn't treated, and she was unable to see a professional outside the hospital. As she was unable to naturally go into labor, the prison decided on a date where they would induce labor, without telling her, to prevent any escape attempt. When the date arrived, despite the fact that she repeatedly asked not to be forced into labor, the guards took her to the hospital where her pregnancy was forcibly induced against her will. Furthermore, the prison did not warn any relatives. She gave birth alone, surrounded only by the medical staff and a prison guard standing in the room the entire time, looking at her while she was in labor. This experience, Schenwar explains, is not unique, and she has heard many similar stories over the years she spent studying the conditions of incarcerated women.

== Rape and sexual assault in prison ==
Rape in female prisons has been commonplace for a long period of time in both the US and the UK. In England and Wales, a report showed that female prisoners are being coerced into sex with staff members in return for various favours, such as alcohol and cigarettes. Rape may even be more common than reports show, given that it is difficult to know the full truth about what goes on behind the walls of a prison, along with the fact that inmates often have no legal remedy to seek justice for abuse and rape.

In the United States, the Alabama prison scandal at the Julia Tutwiler Prison for Women revealed gross sexual misconduct by male staff members against female inmates, including rape. Trying to report these abuses would be punishable by humiliation and solitary confinement while punishments for the sexual offenders were rare and small.

In the United Kingdom, transgender prisoner Karen White received a life sentence in 2018 after admitting to sexual assault (including two counts of rape) of vulnerable women prisoners at HM Prison New Hall near Wakefield, West Yorkshire, although she was described by the prosecution as having used a "transgender persona" having been born male. She was held there on remand in September 2017. White, who started transitioning while in prison, was described by the judge as a "predator" and a danger to women and children.

In October 2020, the Ministry of Justice (United Kingdom) (MoJ) policy on incarcerating transgender prisoners in women's prison was challenged at the High Court of Justice by an unnamed prisoner. She alleges she was sexually assaulted by a trans woman prisoner, in possession of a Gender Recognition Certificate, in August 2017 in HMP Bronzefield. The claimant is supported by the campaigning group Keep Prisons Single Sex, which alleges that the trans woman had been convicted of rape as a man. The MoJ denies that there was an assault. Karon Monaghan QC argued, for the claimant, that MoJ policies "allow prisoners to be accommodated in the prison estate that corresponds to their declared gender identity, irrespective of whether they have taken any legal or medical steps to acquire that gender". Sarah Hannett QC, for the MoJ, said that the policies "implement a nuanced and fact-sensitive approach" to balancing competing interests, and that "Any policy in this area is unlikely to satisfy every interested person". The case is adjourned, likely until 2021. Transgender women however have also reported high rates of sexual abuse inside male's prisons.

== Drug offenders ==
Between 2010 and 2011, the rate for the imprisonment of female drug offenders was at 5.7%, a drop from 6% in 2010. The treatment in which female drug offenders receive has also been closely analyzed in the U.S. In the U.S., compared with male prisoners, women offenders have been more likely to report instances of childhood trauma, abuse, addiction, post-traumatic stress disorder, interpersonal violence, adolescent conduct disorder, homelessness, as well as chronic physical and mental health problems, and because of such problems, women are more likely to commit criminal activity or have severity to addiction. One of the problems female offenders are facing is that they need more special substance abuse treatment for their gender, but the treatment they receive are mostly male-oriented programs such as Therapeutic Community (TC) models. As substance abuse treatment is not fairly granted in prisons across the U.S., recidivism is likely to go up within 2011, with the most serious offense for 59.4% of women incarcerated in federal prisons being drug violations.

== Issues in studying the incarceration of women ==
Before the 1980s, there was a lack of female representation in criminology around the world, making research in this area very difficult. This low level of representation was due to the fact that gender was not a large topic of debate. When studies would come up regarding the subject of criminology, most theories regarding crime were largely male-modelled due to the significant portion of crime attributed to males. However, due to the feminist movement in the 1960s, demand for information concerning female incarceration arose. Due to this growing demand that gained speed in the 1980s, research in crimes committed by women has surged

== Children of incarcerated parents ==
The number of children with mothers in prison has doubled during the 17 years from 1990 to 2007, according to a 2007 report run by the Bureau of Justice Statistic (BJS). Some of these studies estimate that for the more than the hundreds of thousands of women incarcerated in either jail or prison are also mothers to about 300,000 children under eighteen. These rates go along with the increasing number of the incarceration of women between the years 1980 and 2022; 500%. Along with the children of incarcerated mothers includes the pregnant women in prison who do not receive the necessary prenatal care within the prison system. Also, leading into the issues of what happens to the child after the birth and the mother during the birthing process if she is imprisoned at the time.

Mainly, Black and Hispanic children were part of the 1.7 million children whose parents were incarcerated during this span. Research has uncovered that sleep disorders and behavioral problems tend to be present on children with mothers in prison. Some studies have shown some mixed evidence on whether or not these negative correlations are in relation to maternal incarceration. This mostly depends on several factors like, the child's age when their mother was/ is incarcerated, gender, race, their coping mechanisms/ resources, and the condition of the child's relationship with his family prior to maternal incarceration. For example, in a study that had used data from the Chapin Hall Center for Children's Integrated Database, cumulative data collected from Illinois and government agencies, found that maternal incarceration affected children that were in their middle childhood/ early adolescent years the most. Children that experienced this at that stage in life showed it to be more likely for those children to drop out of school and exhibit behavioral issues. Some of these behavioral problems could include issues with attention, rule breaking, social problems and more with their development. Using data from the Fragile Families and Child Wellbeing study, they also presented that, "...children with incarcerated mothers had aggressive behaviors that were about one-sixth of a standard deviation higher than their counterparts..." showing that the prevalence of behavioral problems in children have some relation to maternal incarceration.

Moreover, a study run by Child Welfare Services (CWS) concludes that the likelihood of being in a vulnerable situation is higher among children whose parents are behind the bars than other children treated by CWS. Most of these chances of being put into a vulnerable situation can be linked to a child's current caregiver in the mother's absence. Some people may be challenged by the idea of being a one-parent household, that they already are relying on public assistance programs, unemployment, etc. In one study it was shown, that 88% of the children they studied experienced more risks at contextual levels that have to do with poverty, substance exposure prior to birth, and more. Children of incarcerated mothers experience being put into a vulnerable situation not just through their given caregivers, but through some children being put into the foster care system. Between the years 1985 all the way to the year 2000, the rate of foster care cases increased by 31 percent.

The constitutional rights of pregnant inmates in US prisons have been undergoing codification and expansion in the 2000s. Data from 2010 show that female incarceration rates are growing more rapidly than male incarceration rates in the United States. One out of every four women in prison is pregnant. However, there is not a lot of data that talks about pregnant women in prisons and if there is most of it is outdated. The data from the department of Justice with the Bureau of Justice Statistics has not updated the estimated number of pregnant women entering state prions since 2004. Less than half of prisons in the United States have official policies about medical care for pregnant inmates, like for example, in a report done on New York State prisons in 2008 showcased that majority of them had no written abortion policy, and that only 23% of the prisons ensured women full access to pregnancy related services. About 48% of prisons have prenatal services. The Rebecca Project during 2010 reported that 34 states in the US do not provide basic prenatal care. They also stated that 41 states around the United States don't ensure sufficient diets for pregnant women while incarcerated. Of these 48% of prisons that have prenatal services, only 15% of prisons have programs implemented to help mothers find suitable work after they give birth. Additionally, only 15% of prisons have policies that require light work or no work for pregnant women. These statistics showcasing the lack of medical service availability required for pregnant women in the United States could lead to possible complications for themselves and their child.

Throughout the United States, pregnant inmates are treated poorly by prison staff because there is a permeating prejudice that pregnant inmates are not "worthy enough to have children". This is particularly shown among Black Women. Regina McKnight, in 2003, was the first Black Woman to be convicted of a homicide after she used drugs during her pregnancy that caused the still birth of her child. This case has led to the intersecting points of discrimination throughout healthcare, criminality, and family policing systems for Black women and mothers. They feel all of these have systematically led to the stigmatization and dehumanization they have experienced during or post-incarceration. There are psychological stressors experienced by pregnant inmates during pregnancy and during the birthing process. For example, thirty-five states allow women to be chained to the bed while in labor and giving birth. In states where shackling is illegal, there are a significant amount of lawsuits claiming that shackling was used during childbirth. Researchers have argued that allowing women to remain shackled to a bed during birth is inhumane and undignified.

== Female incarceration rates by country and US state ==
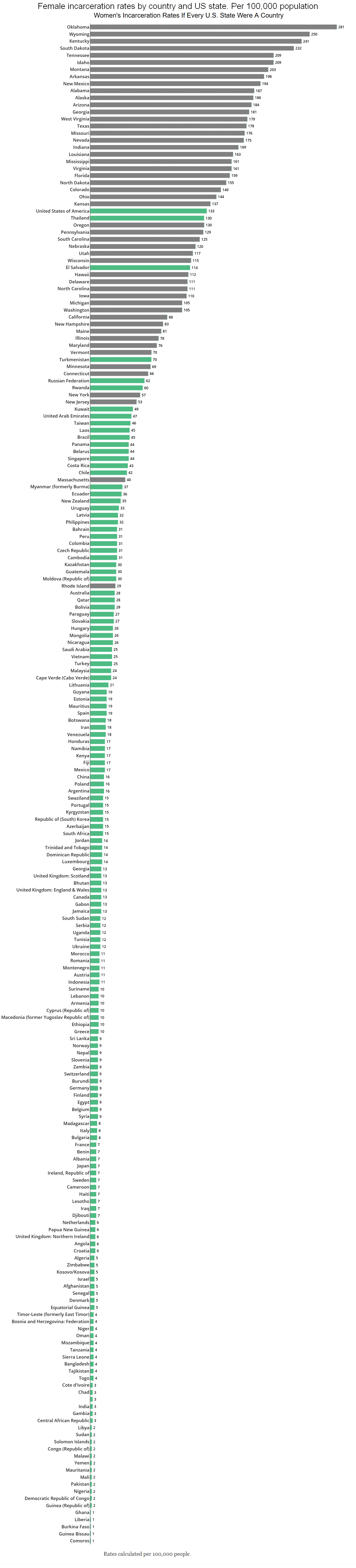
Female incarceration rates by country and US state

Female incarceration rates by country and US state. Per 100,000 female population of all ages. Female incarceration rates if every US state were a country. Incarcerated females of all ages (where the data is available). From a 2018 report with latest available data. From the source report: "Figure 1. This graph shows the number of women in state prisons, local jails, and federal prisons from each U.S. state per 100,000 people in that state and the incarceration rate per 100,000 in all countries with at least a half-million in total population."

== See also ==
- The Bangkok Rules
- List of countries by incarceration rate. See section with a table for per cent of female prisoners by country.
- Convict women in Australia
- Gender responsive approach for girls in the juvenile justice system
- Gender-responsive prisons
- Gender-specific prison programming in the United States
- Menopause in incarceration
- Sex and crime
- Solitary confinement of women
- Women in prison film
- Decarceration in the United States
