= Vickie Roach =

Aboriginal Australian activist (born 1958)

- Born: Vickie Lee Roach; 1958 (age 67–68); Merewether, New South Wales, Australia
- Education: Swinburne University of Technology, M.Writing
- Occupation: Activist

Vickie Lee Roach (born 1958) is an Aboriginal Australian activist. She is a Yuin woman. She was the plaintiff in the landmark Australian High Court case Roach v Electoral Commissioner. At the time of the case, she was serving a six-year term in prison. Since her release, she has become an advocate for prison abolition.

== Early life and criminal convictions ==
Vickie Lee Roach was born in 1958 in Merewether, New South Wales. She is a member of the Yuin people, an Aboriginal group whose Country is located on the South Coast of New South Wales. In 1961, at the age of two, she was charged with neglect, removed from her mother's care and placed with a non-Indigenous foster family.

Roach left the foster system at 13, following which she had numerous criminal convictions. She had 125 convictions or guilty verdicts recorded against her from 1976 to 2003, "[n]inety-nine percent" of which she classifies as "crimes of survival or disobedience".

On 14 December 2002, Roach and her partner robbed a milk bar in Mordialloc, a suburb of Melbourne. While driving away from the robbery at high speeds under the influence of alcohol and other drugs, she crashed into another car, severely injuring its driver. She received a sentence of six years with a non-parole period of four years.

== Roach v Electoral Commissioner ==
While serving her sentence at the Dame Phyllis Frost Centre in 2006, Roach completed a master's degree in writing from Swinburne University of Technology. She was then the plaintiff in a case that challenged legislation preventing prisoners from voting. The High Court of Australia ruled in Roach v Electoral Commissioner (2007) that a blanket ban on prisoners voting was inappropriate, striking down legislation passed in 2006 that prevented prisoners serving sentences of less than three years from voting. As Roach's sentence was longer than three years, she was not personally granted suffrage by the decision. Roach v Electoral Commissioner was in 2021 described by Jonathan Crowe and Dani Larkin as "one of the most significant cases in recent Australian constitutional history". For her work on the case, Roach was a joint winner of the 2007 Tim McCoy Human Rights Award.

== Later activism ==
Roach was released from prison in August 2008. Since her release, she has become an activist, particularly advocating for Indigenous women, women suffering domestic violence, and incarcerated women. She was a founding member of the National Network of Incarcerated and Formerly Incarcerated Women and Girls.

Roach believes that her first criminal charge at the age of two was "basically the start of [her] criminalisation," and that it "set the course for [her] life… negatively influenc[ing] the way [she] was viewed by police and other authorities from then on". She is an advocate for prison abolition. She believes that prisons do not lead to rehabilitation, instead causing people to "become subhuman". She has proposed alternatives such as dadirri ("a Central Desert tradition of going out in the bush and reconnecting with country and culture"), halfway houses for low-risk female prisoners, and "healing places, particularly for Aboriginal women".

== Filmography ==
=== Film ===
| Year | Title | Role | Notes | Ref |
|---|---|---|---|---|
| 2009 | This Is How You'll Make Your Bed in Prison | Self | Short film | |
| 2021 | Incarceration Nation | Self | | |

=== Television ===
| Year | Title | Role | Notes | Refs |
|---|---|---|---|---|
| 2019 | You Can't Ask That | Self | Episode: "Domestic and Family Violence" | |
| 2026 | Judgment: Cases That Changed Australia | Self | Episode: "Vote" | |
