= Incarceration Nation =

2021 documentary by Dean Gibson

- Directed by: Dean Gibson
- Written by: Dean Gibson
- Produced by: Helen Morrison
- Cinematography: Mark Broadbent
- Edited by: Lindi Harrison
- Music by: Glen Hunt; Tane Matheson; Peter Thornley
- Release date: 2021
- Running time: 90 minutes
- Country: Australia
- Language: English
- Budget: $1,300,000 (estimated)

"Incarceration Nation" is a 2021 documentary film written and directed by Dean Gibson. It examines the Australian justice system's treatment of Indigenous people, exploring the historical and contemporary factors contributing to their high incarceration rates. The film features interviews with various individuals, including activists and legal experts, providing insights into the systemic issues faced by Indigenous communities. Through personal stories and archival footage, the documentary aims to raise awareness and promote discussions about the need for justice system reforms.

== Interviewees ==
Individuals interviewed in Incarceration Nation.

- Prof. Derek Chong – psychiatrist
- Joshua Creamer – barrister
- Apryl Day – daughter of Tanya Day
- Leetona Dungay – mother of David Dungay Jr.
- Mick Gooda – public servant, Human Rights Commissioner (2009–2016)
- Olga Havnen – CEO of Danila Dilba Health Service
- Debbie Kilroy – prison reform activist and lawyer
- Tony McAvoy – barrister
- Amy McQuire – author and journalist
- Keenan Mundine – co-founder of Deadly Connections
- Mathew Myers – ALRC Indigenous Incarceration Inquiry commissioner
- Teela Reid – lawyer
- Vickie Roach – prison abolitionist
- Jodie Sizer – Co-CEO of PWC's Indigenous Consulting (2016–2021)
- Carly Stanley – CEO and co-founder of Deadly Connections
- Jim Taylor – former WA police officer
- Assoc. Prof. Chelsea Watego – author and academic
- Prof. Don Weatherburn – National Drug and Alcohol Research Centre professor

== Reception ==
Writing in the Sydney Morning, Herald Craig Mathieson gave it 4 stars and states "It’s about a country that disproportionately punishes its original inhabitants, and it is in turn unnerving, shocking, and tragic; Gibson does not blink. It captures how the system can fail the individual, and with a test program in the NSW town of Bourke how some basic improvements might actually be made."

Also in the Sydney Morning, Herald Bridget McManus gave it 4 stars. She says "the film expands with evidence that has been hiding in plain sight. With the blessing of courageous families, incredibly distressing vision of abuse and neglect at the hands of police and prison officers is relayed. Indigenous lawyers, barristers and advocates – many of them relatively new faces on television – dissect the issue, tracing it back to colonisation with appalling historical footnotes, and offer solutions."

Eddie Cockrell of the Weekend Australian wrote "Incarceration Nation is distressing and exhausting, and that may well be the point".

== Awards ==
Award / Film Festival	Year	Category	Recipient(s)	Result	Ref.
Sydney Film Festival	2021	Documentary Australia Foundation Award	Incarceration Nation	Nominated	
Logie Awards	2022	Most Outstanding Factual or Documentary Program	Incarceration Nation	Won	
BronzeLens Film Festival	2022	Best Documentary	Incarceration Nation	Nominated	
Walkley Awards	2022	Walkley Documentary Award	Helen Morrison, and Dean Gibson	Shortlisted	
