= Dame Phyllis Frost Centre =

Prison in Melbourne, Australia

Coordinates: 37°46′57″S 144°44′32″E

- Interactive map of Dame Phyllis Frost Centre
- Location: Deer Park, Victoria
- Security class: Maximum Security
- Capacity: 604
- Opened: 15 August 1996
- Managed by: Corrections Victoria

The Dame Phyllis Frost Centre, formerly the Deer Park Metropolitan Women's Correctional Centre (MWCC) is a maximum security women's prison located at Deer Park, Victoria, Australia. Built in 1996, it was the first privately-owned prison in Victoria. It was transferred to public ownership in 2000 and is run by Corrections Victoria. It also houses medium security and all protection prisoners.

== History ==
Deer Park Metropolitan Women's Correctional Centre (MWCC) was built in 1996 as the first privately designed, financed and operated prison in Victoria. Operated by Corrections Corporation of Australia (a joint venue by Corrections Corporation of America and Sodexho) the prison facility was opened on 15 August 1996 and received its first prisoners that same month, many of whom had been transferred from Fairlea Women's Prison. The prison was the subject of intense scrutiny from its opening, as a result of incidents including self-harm and what the Victorian Corrections Commissioner described as "a failure to have adequate suicide prevention protocols in place". Following four years of scandals, the Government reclaimed the prison from private ownership in 2000.

On 3 October 2000, the government took control of the facility and appointed an administrator under section 8F of the Corrections Act, and section 27B of the prison contract to operate the prison. On 2 November 2000, the Minister for Corrections announced the transfer of ownership and management of MWCC to the public sector. The centre was renamed after welfare worker and philanthropist Dame Phyllis Frost, who was well known for her commitment to unpopular causes, most notably helping women prisoners. As of 2008 it was Victoria's largest women's prison, holding 604 prisoners. As of June 2010 it accommodated 260 prisoners.

In March 2021 it was announced that the prison would be expanded with 106 new beds at a cost of $188.9 million.

It is one of only two women's prisons in Victoria, the other being HM Prison Tarrengower. As HM Prison Tarrengower is minimum security mainstream, all other female prisoners (medium security, maximum security, and all protection prisoners) are imprisoned at the Dame Phyllis Frost Centre.

== Notable incidents ==
In October 2003, male prison guard Kelvin McCann was charged with raping a mentally ill prisoner who was found to be pregnant when she was transferred to the Thomas Embling Hospital, a secured psychiatric hospital, and DNA tests revealed he was the father. The guard pleaded not guilty to the charges.

In December 2007, a Department of Justice and Regulation office filing cabinet which was being moved to new offices was mistakenly discarded at a second-hand furniture shop and bought by a Point Cook couple who discovered abandoned documents in the cabinet. After lengthy court action, documents from the filing cabinet were released and revealed allegations of corruption and sexual abuse at the Dame Phyllis Frost Centre.

In November 2009, it was reported in the media that heroin and methamphetamine were "readily available" in the jail and that there had been a large increase in drug overdoses and suicide attempts among inmates at the prison. The acting operations manager was also accused of changing rosters so as to have sex with a female prison officer, including once at the jail.

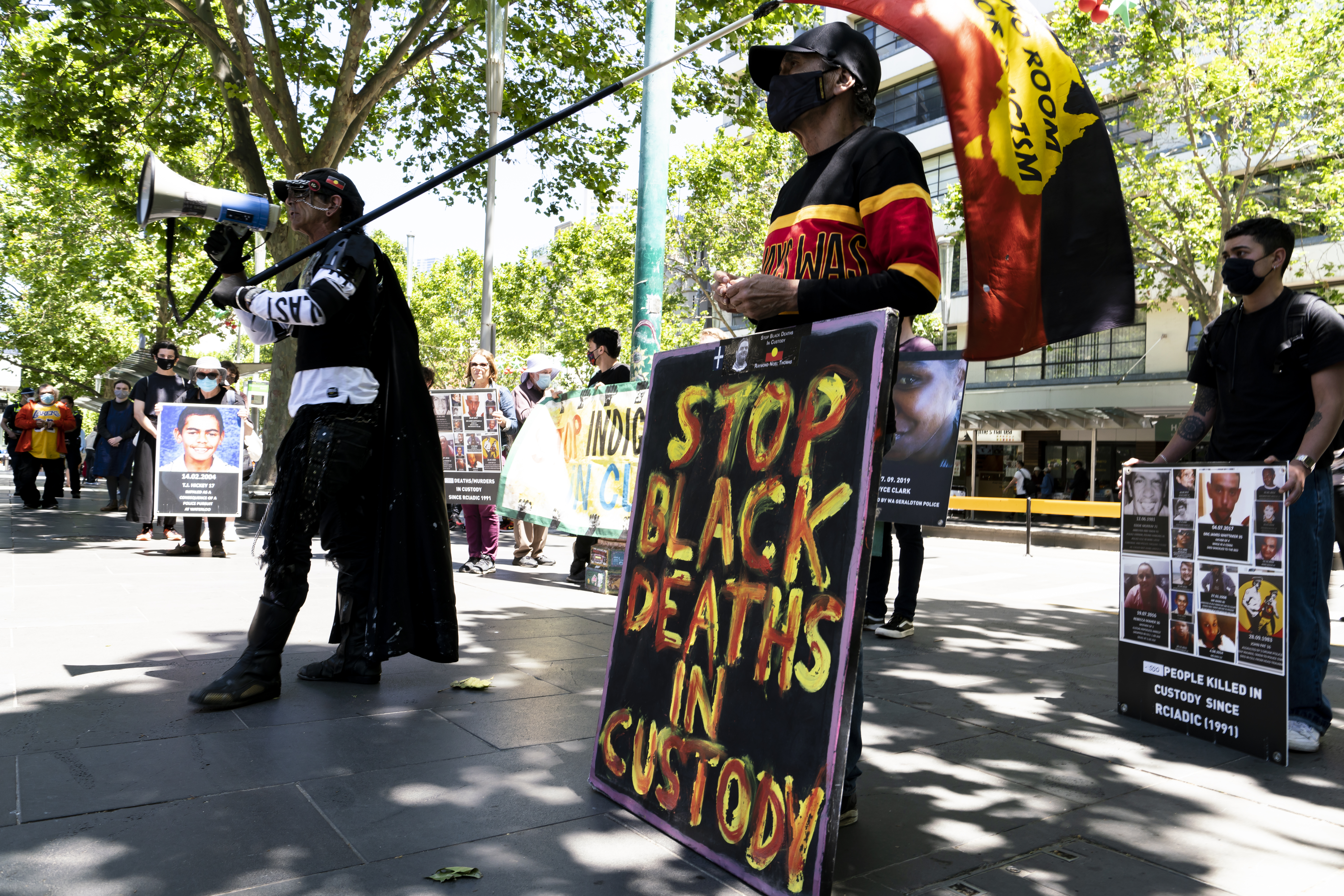
Response to the death of an Aboriginal woman in custody at the Dame Phyllis Frost Centre

In March 2018, the body of a male prison officer was found. His death was not being treated as suspicious.

In November 2021, an Indigenous woman held prisoner was transferred to Sunshine Hospital, where she later died.

== Notable prisoners ==
- Tania Herman
- Malka Leifer
- Andrea Mohr
- Renate Mokbel
- Judy Moran
- Erin Patterson
- Wendy Peirce
- Caroline Reed Robertson
- Vickie Roach
- Roberta Williams
