= Feminist pathways perspective =

Feminist perspective of criminology

The feminist pathways perspective is a feminist perspective of criminology which suggests victimization throughout the life course is a key risk factor for women's entry into offending.

== Victimization ==
Victimization has profound psychological consequences and impacts the social development of an individual. There is considerable evidence that victimization is a precursor to involvement in crime. While victimization is a risk factor for both men and women's criminal behavior, it is a stronger predictor for women. Although both men and women may experience victimization in their lifetime, women experience and respond to victimization differently than men due to gender inequalities. Incarcerated women experience higher rates of victimization than both incarcerated men and the general female population.

Women's imprisonment is frequently attributed to drug addiction, prostitution, and retaliation to an abuser. While these attributions are characterized as crimes, research has also begun to conceptualize them as survival strategies to cope with victimization. A young girl, for example, may run away from an abusive home and turn to prostitution as a way to make a living. Literature on victimization has often created a division between victims and offenders. However, these two groups are not as separate as was once understood.

It was not until the 1970s that research analyzed victimization, traumas, and past abuse as factors that can influence women to commit crimes. In the early 20th century, the personal histories of women in crime were not a focus of research. Early literature suggested women were antisocial due to their biology, environment, and socialization. Lombroso, for instance, distinguished female offenders from non-offenders based on their physical anatomies. These early explanatory factors were understood individualistically outside of a social-historical context.

=== Connection to criminal activity ===
There is a well-documented association between criminal behavior and victimization among female offenders. That said, the age and gendered patterns of victimization risk, context, and consequences are highly visible and exacerbated among incarcerated women. There is evidence to support that women involved with crime often have extensive histories of physical and sexual abuse. Female offenders are more likely to have been abused than male offenders and more likely to have been victimized than female non-offenders. A survey of national correctional populations found that over half of female inmates have been physically or sexually abused, compared to fewer than one in five male inmates.

Literature suggests female offenders' victimization often begins at a young age and persists through her lifetime. Nearly two thirds of incarcerated women have experienced at least one event of abuse by age eleven. Ninety-two percent of girls under 18 in the California juvenile justice system report having faced emotional, sexual, or physical abuse. Eighty percent of women in prison in the United States have experienced an event of physical or sexual abuse in her lifetime. This lifetime of violence is "pervasive and severe." The literature suggests that the prevalence of victimization among incarcerated women and its cumulative impact indicates that victimization is a central factor for women's entry into crime.

== Demographics of victimization ==
The feminist pathways perspective is not meant to suggest that victimization is unique to women. Instead, this perspective addresses how gender impacts the experience of victimization, and how this difference in experience paves the path to crime for women. An individual's risk of victimization is shaped by environmental context, social networks, and demographics. Life course researchers maintain that people are exposed to violence to various degrees based on their location, socioeconomic circumstance, and lifestyle choices. According to the lifestyle exposure perspective, sociodemographic traits give rise to lifestyle differences which may put an individual at an increased risk of victimization. For instance, someone from a low-income neighborhood who spends time in public places at night and among strangers may be more likely to encounter offenders, and therefore at a greater risk of victimization.

=== Age ===
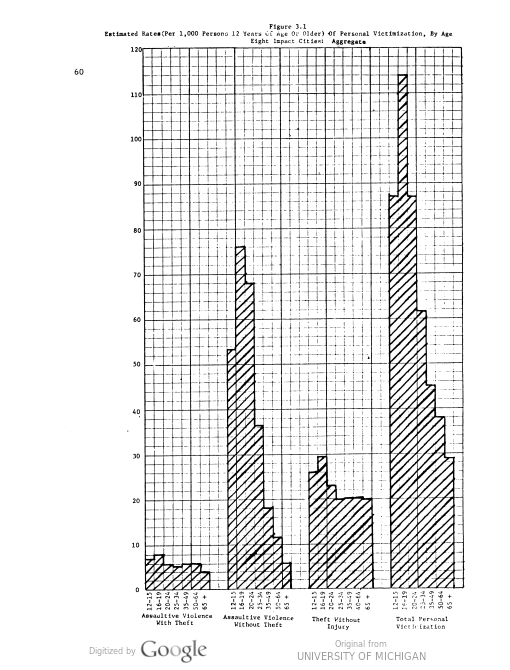
Estimated Rates (Per 1,000 Persons 12 Years of Age or Older) of Personal Victimization, By Age (Hindelang 1976)

Age is strongly associated with victimization risk, especially for property and violent crimes. Victimization tends to be concentrated early in life. Young people are significantly more likely to experience violent victimization than older adults. Victimization risk peaks between ages 16 and 19. According to the National Crime Victimization Survey, the risk of victimization increases by 8 percent from ages 12 to 15 and 16 to 19. The opportunity perspective attributes this tendency to the way social activities are structured by age. Young adults are more likely to be in situations where they can be exposed to offenders, or engage in activities where they can be easily targeted.

The young age at which the risk of victimization peaks has significant implications on the psychological and social development of the victim. Childhood is a critical period of growth, and child victims, according to the cycle of violence thesis, will be more likely to be involved in violent crime in the future. Thus, victimization during developmental years has the potential to disrupt the normal maturation of an individual, and shape the paths this individual may take– including the pathway to prison.

=== Gender ===
Gender shapes the risk, context, and consequences of victimization. According to government statistics, with the exception of rape, men are more likely than women to be victims of all violent crimes. However, women are underrepresented as victims in official data, and are much more likely than men to be targets of certain types of victimization, such as rape and domestic violence. Women are more likely to have been victims of child abuse than men and more likely to have experienced abuse at an early age.

The way victimization is gendered also impacts how women experience and respond to their victimization. Although victimization during childhood or adolescence is a predictor for female and male offending, the literature suggests it is a stronger predictor for females. Research provides multiple explanations for why victimization has such a prominent effect on women's future delinquency. Girls grow up in what Chesney-Lind describes as a "different world" than boys, and therefore experience a different form of socialization. Feminist criminologists argue that women adapt to traumas differently than men due to gender inequalities. Women tend to have limited opportunities to cope with stress openly. Instead, it is thought that women internalize traumas as feelings of worthlessness, fear, or distress. As a result, the negative effect of stressors is magnified in women. The literature proposes that gendered expectations and gender roles also shape how traumas impact women differently than men. For instance, society teaches women that they are valued by the strength of their familial and social networks. That said, poor interpersonal relationships are a stronger risk factor for female offending than male offending. Trauma theorists argue that traumas are rarely treated professionally. Women, therefore, may adapt to victimization by turning to activities or substances, like drugs, that are considered criminal. These crimes can be framed as coping strategies.

=== Polyvictimization ===
Polyvictimization refers to experiencing different and simultaneous episodes of victimization. Most incarcerated women who have experienced victimization have survived multiple traumas over a lifespan. These repeated traumas have an aggregate impact. A disproportionally high number of all victimizations account for polyvictimizations. Women are more likely to be polyvictimized than men. This is likely because females are more likely to be abused than males, and find themselves in abusive relationships from childhood to adulthood.

Research has recognized both the prevalence and mounting consequences of repeat victimization. Polyvictimization can disrupt multiple relationships and aspects of a woman's life. The ripple effects of these disruptions can push a woman off the "path of normalcy." There is evidence that unrelenting traumas in the early stages of a young girl's life can lead her to act criminally or "out of the mainstream"

=== Main routes from victimization to crime ===
Women's victimization has both direct and indirect effects that relate to women's criminal behavior. Among the many traumas female offenders experience in a lifetime, child abuse and partner abuse have well-documented associations with female criminal behavior.

==== Child abuse ====
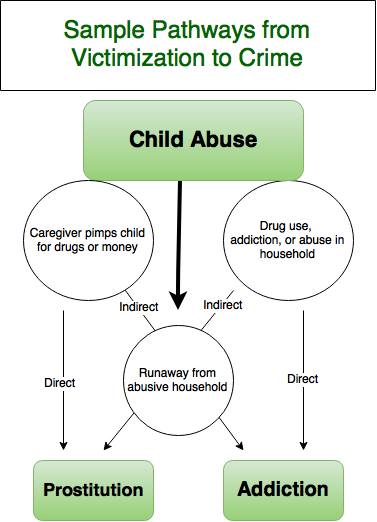
Sample pathways from child abuse to crime. Inspired by DeHart (2008).

Female juvenile delinquents are more frequently victims of sexual or physical abuse than male juvenile delinquents. Eighty-two percent of the incarcerated women interviewed by Browne, Miller, and Maguin at the Bedford Hills Maximum Security Correctional Facility were abused during childhood, and nearly 60 percent had been sexually abused by a parental figure. Research suggests that girls experience child abuse – both physical and sexual – differently than boys. For instance, girls are more likely to have experienced penetrative abuse and less likely to have been physically abused.

Childhood victimization is a strong predictor of future criminal behavior and future mental health issues. Given the gender differences in child abuse experience, the association between child abuse and delinquency is also distinct for males and females. According to data collected from the Washington State Court Juvenile Assessment data, physical child abuse is a strong predictor of women's violent behavior. However, there is little research on the specific mechanism that links childhood victimization and delinquent behavior.

Feminist criminologists understand childhood victimization as a structured theme throughout the lives of incarcerated women. The long-term effects of childhood victimization are essential to understanding how women become incarcerated. For some women, childhood victimization directly relates to their involvement in crime. In these situations, children may be "missocialized" by caregivers who offer them drugs, force them to steal, or exploit them as prostitutes.

Childhood victimization also has indirect links to future offending. There is evidence that girls from abusive households are more at risk to run away before adulthood, therefore subjecting themselves to an increased risk of becoming involved with drugs or prostitution. The majority of female juvenile offenders report that their first arrest was for running away from an abusive home. Prostitution, property crimes, and drug distribution become means of survival for young female runaways. Additionally, women who were physically or sexually abused as children by caretakers have a significantly higher risk of drug abuse and addiction. Some young women become dependent on drugs to desensitize themselves from their traumatic histories. Women's involvement in drugs or prostitution then significantly increases their chances of arrest or incarceration.

==== Partner abuse ====
Studies have observed large numbers of incarcerated women who experienced intimate partner violence prior to incarceration. Seventy-five percent of the women studied by Browne, Miller, and Maguin at the Bedford Hills Maximum Security Correctional Facility reported histories of partner abuse. Rates of partner abuse among female offenders are higher than those among male offenders. A national correctional population survey from 1999 found that 61.3 percent of women had been abused by an intimate partner prior to incarceration, compared to only 5.9 percent of men. Research on incarcerated women suggests there is an association between childhood sexual assault and adulthood sexual assault. This suggests that a lifetime of victimization is characteristic of the female offender. Partner abuse is common within this lifetime of victimization. Intimate partner violence has both direct and indirect implications for a woman's entry into crime.

Some feminist criminologists suggest that partner abuse coerces, if not forces, women to become involved in crime. In these situations, an abusive partner may entrap a woman into crime. There is evidence that incarcerated women were forced by their partners– through physical attacks or threats –to commit murders, robbery, check fraud, and sell or carry drugs. Richie observed this gender entrapment among battered African-American women in New York City jails, whom she described as being "compelled to crime." Financially abusive partners may manipulate women into debt until they are left with no resources, and as a result, are more likely to turn to criminal activities to support themselves.

Partner abuse also has indirect effects on the pathway to crime. There is evidence that women are sometimes implicated for crimes related to their partner abuse. Some women, for example, retaliated against their abuser and were imprisoned for homicide-related charges. Some women were implicated in the abuse of their children, who were also harmed by the abusive partner. Research also finds that victims of intimate partner violence are likely to be involved with drugs. Drugs are either introduced by the abuser, or they become a self-medicated coping mechanism. Abusive partners sometimes isolate a woman from her social networks, thus structurally dislocating her from all legitimate institutions, such as family. Women reported feeling a sense of rejection and worthlessness as a result of this isolation, and often coped by using drugs. Battered women are surrounded by extreme stress and can become dependent on these substances. Obtaining drugs puts these women at an increased risk of arrest.

== Critique of the victimization explanation ==
=== Women's agency ===
The feminist perspective on crime is sometimes criticized for overemphasizing or disregarding women's agency. Traditional feminist approaches to women in crime often overlook women's locations in society and place too much emphasis on women's individual choices. This paints female offenders as active participants who are compelled to act criminally. In contrast, some research strips women of their agency and portrays them as "passive victims of oppressive social structures, relations, and substances, or some combination thereof." This portrayal perpetuates the notion that women are always submissive to social structures. Critics hold that it is essential for research on women in crime to consider both the social-historical context and the woman's individual motivations.

=== Intersectionality ===
Although the feminist pathways perspective attempts to differentiate the experience of men and women in crime, it does not take into account the complex factors that also impact a woman's experiences and histories, such as race and class. Some critics argue that a "feminist" perspective too often only considers the experiences of a white, middle-class woman. Just as gender acts as an organizing principle in society, race and class also shape opportunity structures and social positions. A suburban upper-class, white woman, for instance, will likely encounter different forms of victimization in her lifetime than a lower-income, African American woman who lives in a crime-ridden neighborhood. An intersectional, or interlocking, perspective takes into account that other social identities impact an individual's victimization and path into crime. Multicultural feminism is necessary to fully understand how social identities interact with traumatic life course events to pave the way to prison.

=== Separating offenders and victims ===
Feminist scholars have strongly discouraged researchers from portraying female offenders and victims as mutually exclusive groups. Instead, critics argue the line between them should be blurred because women's involvement in crime is so often linked to their subordinate social positions, which make them vulnerable to victimization. Critics hold that women can only be understood as criminals if they are also understood as victims, necessitating fluidity between offenders and victims.
