= Natal alienation =

Natal alienation is the estrangement or disconnection from historical memory which occurs by severing an individual from their kinship traditions, cultural heritage (including language and religion), and economic inheritance through experiences of social death. It creates the conditions in which an individual, now estranged from knowledge of their social heritage, can become a commodity defined by their relationship to systems and structures that often caused and benefit from their very alienation.

The term was coined by sociologist Orlando Patterson in reference to the conditions of African slaves through the Trans-Atlantic slave trade. The natally alienated individual is embodied in the colonized individual who has been forced to reject or forget their own histories, being born into a society which prevents them from participating in or knowing their traditions and conditions them to forget them. It has been described as the inheritance of disinheritance and an existential homelessness.

== Examples ==
American-born African enslaved people who were brought to the American colonies experienced high rates of natal alienation. Scholar Cornel West identifies that, while only 4.5% of all Africans imported to the "New World" arrived in North America, this percentage quadrupled "through an incredibly high rate of slave reproduction." As West identifies, this had the following result: "Second- and third-generation Africans in the USA made sense of and gave meaning to their predicament without an immediate relation to African worldviews and customs."

Aboriginal Australians have been described as undergoing extreme forms of natal alienation. As Belinda Wheeler details, "successive removal policies have directly resulted in generations of mothers with 'no prototype' for transmitting the basics of mothering knowledge to their own children, let alone knowledge of traditional Aboriginal worldview, practices, and values." Australia instituted policies in the twentieth century to "eliminate Aborigines through the eugenic expedient of 'breeding them white,'" which was standardized in all of its states by 1937.

The majority of the Indigenous peoples of California experienced natal alienation through the California Genocide by the end of the nineteenth century. Scholar Wendy Cheng writes that they "were reduced to naturally vanishing, picturesque figures in a sentimentalized history."

Huanani-Kay Trask writes that natal alienation creates a psychological dependency for Indigenous peoples: "Generations become addicted to the worst cultural habits of colonial society which increases both, ignorance of, and alienation from the native culture...."
