= Solitary confinement of women in the United States =

Solitary Confinement In The US

Solitary confinement rates for women in the United States are roughly comparable to those for men and about 20% of prisoners will be in solitary confinement at some point during their prison career. While studies show the effects of solitary confinement are detrimental to inmates generally, the solitary confinement of women has specific consequences that differ from its effects on men.

Although segregation as a disciplinary or precautionary measure is typically reserved for offenders who commit violent acts in prison, women are frequently placed in solitary confinement for minor offenses, such as throwing items or talking back to guards. Solitary confinement is also often applied to women who complain of sexual assault from prison guards or other inmates. Once in solitary confinement, women are often monitored more closely and disciplined more harshly than men.

== Prevalence ==
According to a 2011–2012 report by the Bureau of Justice Statistics, about 20% of female prison inmates and 17% of female jail inmates spent time in solitary confinement, rates comparable to those for men.

Solitary confinement is used to prevent violence within the prison population and has become more prevalent in the U.S. over the last several decades, arguably due to the prison–industrial complex and rising incarceration rates. In most prisons, inmates who are put into solitary confinement are confined under one of three frameworks: disciplinary segregation, voluntary administrative segregation, and involuntary administrative segregation. Disciplinary segregation is used as a punishment, while administrative segregation is a preventative measure intended to protect inmates.

=== Disciplinary segregation ===
An offender who has committed a "serious disciplinary offense" may be put in solitary confinement as a punitive measure. Inmates put into disciplinary segregation are not required to be given the same privileges as those put into administrative segregation, but the duration of their stay in isolation tends to be shorter. According to a magazine written by inmates in a California prison, the practice operates under a "guilty until proven innocent" protocol, holding prisoners in solitary confinement before it is clear they committed an infraction.

Inmates who are considered to be politically threatening are sometimes put into isolation; and some inmates not incarcerated on political grounds are placed in solitary confinement because of their political activism. This means that minorities are also more likely to end up in solitary confinement than members of majority groups.

=== Administrative segregation ===
Administrative segregation, or "ad seg", is more common than disciplinary segregation and serves to protect either the inmate being placed in solitary or others in the prison. An offender may be put into administrative segregation if they are thought to be dangerous to others or if their own safety is in danger, or if "the inmate has the potential to interfere with an ongoing investigation." Often, women who report feeling threatened by another person are put into administrative segregation. Similarly, if they are accused of acting threatening in any way, they may be segregated. Women who are placed in administrative segregation tend to be those women who have had trouble adjusting to prison life and who are seen as "high-risk" or "high-needs" when they enter the prison. Because this type of segregation is not intended as punishment, inmates in administrative segregation are legally required to be treated in the same way as those in general confinement in prison.

==== Voluntary ====
Women prisoners sometimes request to be put into solitary confinement for their own protection. Specifically, some women are thought to request solitary confinement to avoid "further assaults on their identity" that might arise from their interactions and experiences in prison. Studies have found that women who have been in voluntary administrative segregation tend to have high personal or emotional needs, and some have struggled with substance abuse, although few have difficulty with "community functioning."

==== Involuntary ====
Women prisoners who are deemed to be dangerous to other prisoners are sometimes put into administrative segregation; a prisoner can also be put in segregation if the officers determine that she herself is in danger and needs this protection. Like women who are voluntarily put into segregation, these women tend to have high personal and emotional needs, but many of them also have difficulties functioning in the community or associating with other people.

=== Women put in segregation ===
In general, women tend to be subjected to harsher disciplinary practices in prisons than men. Most women in jail have committed crimes that are nonviolent offenses, such as drug fraud, property theft, substance abuse, or sex work. Women are often segregated for minor infractions, whereas men typically must commit violent offenses, such as attacking a guard, to be placed in solitary confinement. Some theorize this is because imprisoned women are held to strict standards of femininity, with prisons subconsciously encouraging them to conform to traditional gender roles. This model of femininity requires women to be "pure, passive, heterosexual, and located in motherhood". When women do not comply with this standard while imprisoned, they are punished further. In fact, some prisons specifically isolate women who seem "butch" or not traditionally feminine.

Another basis for being put into solitary confinement that applies disproportionately to women is that prisoners who complain of abusive treatment by guards are often segregated as retaliation. In particular, women who speak out after guards have sexually harassed them are often put into segregation. Not only does this mean that guards who are guilty of sexually harassing inmates go unpunished, it also decreases the likelihood that women will report harassment.

In some prisons, women may be put into solitary confinement because their mental health issues prove to be too difficult for the authorities to deal with or are exhausting their resources. If the prison authorities are unable to address their inmates' health concerns, they may put them into solitary confinement to avoid solving the problem. This means that the women in solitary confinement are often already at risk for mental health or other challenges, due to previous health concerns or sexual abuse.

== Consequences for women ==
Solitary confinement has been shown to be detrimental to the mental and physical well-being of all inmates of all ages. Segregation can be more harmful for women than for men, often due to patriarchal structures extending from outside the prison environment. Because they "experience segregation as women", female inmates are subjected to slightly different treatment than men, and their perception of this treatment may differ.

=== Psychological effects ===
Being put into solitary confinement can be very damaging to the mental health of female inmates, particularly those with a history of mental or physical illness, as has been found in a number of studies that observed and interviewed women who were being held in solitary confinement. Studies have found that prolonged isolation can worsen mental health conditions; being held in a small space without access to objects, recreation, or human contact can lead to claustrophobia, anger, depression, hallucinations, insomnia, and obsessive fixation on dying. On a psychosomatic level, inmates in solitary confinement often experience a loss of appetite and weight, dizziness, or heart palpitations.

Some of the anxiety inmates experience in solitary confinement stems from a loss or confusion of identity. Prisoners are not allowed to decorate their small rooms or bring most of the possessions allowed in general confinement. This prevents the women from having any sort of entertainment and exacerbates feelings of loss of individuality and personal identity.

Because prisoners kept in segregation often interact little with the outside world, and because the routines of eating and cleaning may be different from in general confinement, the women lose their ability to mark time. The Fire Inside magazine, written by offenders in California women's prisons, quotes one prisoner as recommending that those held in solitary confinement "create a schedule" and determine the time of day, because it "helps to assert control over your own life and not be totally defined by whatever 'routine' the prison is forcing on you".

Another aspect of their identity that is destroyed is their ability to form or maintain relationships with others within and outside prison. This is impossible when in solitary confinement. It has been argued that this has a harmful effect on women especially. These conclusions were drawn from interviews with women who were still in solitary confinement, women who had been in solitary but had since been transferred back to the general prison population, and women who had been in solitary but had been released from incarceration, suggesting that these effects carry over beyond their time in segregation.

All of these factors combined can have different effects on women, making them either increasingly anxious or increasingly indifferent. While some women feel desperate and angry, others attempt to feel as little as possible in order to mitigate the effects of segregation. Because of the detrimental effect on their mental stability, inmates in solitary confinement often resort to self-harm; this behavior is more common in women than in men. This can sometimes lead to women being held in solitary confinement for longer, as punishment for their destructive actions. Similarly, it reinforces the guards' perceptions of these women as particularly violent or dangerous to the rest of the prison community.

=== Sexual abuse ===
Women in solitary confinement are often watched over by male guards, which can facilitate sexual harassment. Male guards often are present while women shower or undress. Because women in solitary confinement experience so little human contact, the gaze of their guards is often the only interaction that they have with another person; this can exacerbate the feelings of loss of privacy.

Women are often forced to undergo thorough strip searches during which guards are more forceful and invasive than necessary, serving mostly to demonstrate authority over the inmates. Because so many female inmates have been victims of sexual or physical abuse, this can be re-traumatizing. This can be especially devastating for women whose mental states are already deteriorating, due to prior mental illness or to the effects of being in segregation.

Women have also reported being publicly humiliated when asking for additional sanitary pads during their menstrual periods, or being forced to hand in their used pads in order to acquire new ones.

=== Separation from children ===
Women are more likely than men to be the primary guardian of a child or children; having a mother who is in solitary confinement can be very detrimental to the children. Inmates in solitary confinement have much less frequent contact with family members, and when they do, they are usually separated by a partition. Although inmates are allowed some visits from immediate family members, long background checks are required. Children with mothers in prison are at a greater risk for depression or anxiety, substance abuse, or involvement in crime.

=== Reentry ===
Women who are released from solitary confinement into the general prison population are more likely than men to experience stigmatization and humiliation from the prison guards. This often leads them to isolate themselves from other prisoners even when they are not in solitary confinement.

Once they are released from prison, these women often have a harder time adjusting to being a part of society again, and frequently end up back in prison. Ex-offenders who were held in solitary confinement are more likely to commit violent acts against others once released than those who spent all their time in the general prison population. As one California prisoner who wrote for The Fire Inside magazine put it: "We go through these kind of mental, emotional, and spiritual stages. At first when you get here you're angry and disoriented ... Paranoia sets in ... I slowly began to think of this cell as my safe place ... What happens next year when they take the box away?" She, and other women in solitary confinement, become unequipped to deal with the outside world and the knowledge of technological advancement, social interaction skills, and mental stability that it requires.

== Women of color in solitary confinement ==
In general, women of color, like men of color, are more likely to be put in prison than white women and men. Likewise, they are thought to be somewhat disproportionately represented in the solitary confinement population. The Bureau of Justice Statistics reports that in 2011–2012, 16% of white prison inmates, 20% of Black/African American prison inmates, 16% of Hispanic or Latino prison inmates, and 20% of prisoners with some other racial identification were in solitary confinement at some point. The difference was slightly less pronounced in jails, with 17% of white, 17% of black/African American, 15% of Hispanic/Latino, and 21% of other inmates spending time in solitary confinement. There is no data available that specifically documents the intersection between race and gender.

== Transgender inmates in solitary confinement ==
Transgender or gender nonconforming people, especially transgender people of color, are overrepresented in prisons. Transgender inmates are much more likely to be sexually assaulted than their cisgender counterparts, and solitary confinement is often implemented to prevent sexual assaults. Transgender women, specifically, are sometimes placed in male prisons, separated from the general population, and put in "protective custody", which functions similarly to solitary confinement.

Being in solitary confinement can have consequences for transgender women's mental and physical health, in particular because transgender people are already more likely to suffer from depression or other mental illness. Prisoners, and especially those in solitary confinement, do not always have access to necessary medications such as hormone therapy.

== Sources ==
- Virdi, Simran (Spring 2023). "Women in Solitary Confinement: Improving California Standards with International Guidelines" (PDF). Gonzaga Journal of International Law. 26 (2): 133–172.
