= Sex differences in crime =

Differences between men and women as the perpetrators or victims of crime

Sex differences in crime are differences between men and women as the perpetrators or victims of crime. Such studies may belong to fields such as criminology (the scientific study of criminal behavior), sociobiology (which attempts to demonstrate a causal relationship between biological factors, in this case biological sex and human behaviors), or feminist studies. Despite the difficulty of interpreting them, crime statistics may provide a way to investigate such a relationship from a gender differences perspective. An observable difference in crime rates between men and women might be due to social and cultural factors, crimes going unreported, or to biological factors (for example, testosterone or sociobiological theories). The nature or motive of the crime itself may also require consideration as a factor. Gendered profiling might affect the reported crime rates.

Statistics have been consistent in reporting that men commit more criminal acts than women. Self-reported delinquent acts are also higher for men than for women, although lower than official data. Low levels of self control are associated with criminal activity. Many professionals have offered explanations for this sex difference. Some differing explanations include men's evolutionary tendency toward risk and violent behavior, sex differences in activity, social support, or gender inequality.

== General theory of crime ==
The "general theory of crime" is accepted among scholars as one of the most valid theories of crime. Burton et al. (1998) assessed Gottfredson and Hirschi's (1990) work on the subject, which stated that individuals with lower levels of self-control are more likely to be involved in criminal behavior, in a gender-sensitive context. The purpose of their study was to account for the gender gap in crime rates. By using a self-reporting questionnaire, Burton et al. (1998) retrieved data from 555 people aged eighteen and older in the Cincinnati, Ohio, area. Early results from the study indicated that low self-control was highly positively correlated to criminal behavior in both genders, but was especially significant for males. For females, the relationship became significant when opportunity was introduced and considered with level of self-control. Opportunity was not a significant indicator of male criminal behavior, which the authors attribute to the assumption that opportunity for criminal behavior is ubiquitous for men. In this study, opportunity was measured by the number of nights per week individuals go out for recreation purposes. Similarly, the authors conclude that women are less likely to be exposed to opportunities for criminal behavior, speculating that "constraints often placed on females, and that accompany their lifestyles" contribute to less opportunity for crime. With self-control being significant for males but not for females, the conclusions of this study pointed toward the notion that men and women commit crimes for different reasons. The notion that self-control was only significant for women when combined with opportunity helps account for the gender gap seen in crime rates.

David Rowe, Alexander Vazsonyi, and Daniel Flannery, authors of Sex Differences in Crime: Do Means and Within-Sex Variation Have Similar Causes?, focus on the widely acknowledged fact that there is a large sex difference in crime: more men than women commit crimes. This has been true over time and across cultures. There is also a greater number of men who commit serious crimes resulting in injury or death than women. In a study that looked at self-reports of delinquent acts, researchers identified several sex differences by looking at sex ratios. For every woman, 1.28 men drink alcohol, which is a large influencer in deviant behavior. For every woman, 2.7 men committed the crime of stealing up to $50. Lastly, for every woman, 3.7 men steal more than $50. Also, more males are involved in homicides, as both the perpetrators and victims, than females. Furthermore, one male is more delinquent than another for mainly the same reasons that men typically engage in criminal acts more than women.

== Nature, nurture, and life course ==
=== Onset ===
Terrie Moffitt and Avshalom Caspi compare childhood risk factors of males and females portraying childhood-onset and adolescent-onset antisocial behavior, which influences deviant behavior in individuals. Childhood-onset delinquency is attributed to lack of parenting, temperament and behavior problems. On the other hand, adolescent-onset delinquents did not encounter similar childhood problems. This study showed a male-to-female ratio of 10:1 for those experiencing childhood-onset delinquency and 15:1 for adolescent-onset delinquency. Moffitt and Caspi hypothesized that "'life-course-persistent' antisocial behavior originates early in life, when the difficult behavior of a high-risk young child is exacerbated by a high-risk social environment". Also, "'adolescent-limited' antisocial behavior emerges alongside puberty, where otherwise healthy youngsters experience dysphoria during the relatively role-less years between biological maturation and access to mature privileges and responsibilities", called the maturity gap. They look at the taxonomy theory, which states that the gender difference in crime are based on sex differences in the risk factors for life-course-persistent antisocial behavior. Based on research, girls are less likely than boys to have nervous system dysfunctions, difficult temperament, late maturity in verbal and motor development, learning disabilities, and childhood behavioral problems.

=== Sociology ===
Gender differences in crime can be connected to socioeconomic factors and marginalization.

Considerations of gender in regard to crime have been considered to be largely ignored and pushed aside in criminological and sociological study, until recent years, to the extent of female deviance having been marginalized. In the past fifty years of sociological research into crime and deviance, sex differences were understood and quite often mentioned within works, such as Merton's theory of anomie; however, they were not critically discussed, and often any mention of female delinquency was only as comparative to males, to explain male behaviors, or through defining the girl as taking on the role of a boy, namely, conducting their behavior and appearance as that of a tomboy and by rejecting the female gender role, adopting stereotypical masculine traits.

Eagly and Steffen suggested in their meta-analysis of data on sex and aggression that beliefs about the negative consequences of violating gender expectations affect how both genders behave regarding aggression. Psychologist Anne Campbell argued that "cultural interpretations have 'enhanced' evolutionarily based sex differences by a process of imposition which stigmatises the expression of aggression by females and causes women to offer exculpatory (rather than justificatory) accounts of their own aggression."

One key reason contended for this lack of attention to females in crime and deviance is due to the view that female crime has almost exclusively been dealt with by men, from policing through to legislators, and that this has continued through into the theoretical approaches, quite often portraying what could be considered as a one-sided view, as Mannheim suggested.

However, other contentions have been made as explanations for the invisibility of women in regard to theoretical approaches, such as: females have an '...apparently low level of offending'); that they pose less of a social threat than their male counterparts; that their 'delinquencies tend to be of a relatively minor kind', but also due to the fear that including women in research could threaten or undermine theories, as Thrasher and Sutherland feared would happen with their research.

Further theories have been contended, with many debates surrounding the involvement and ignoring of women within theoretical studies of crime; however, with new approaches and advances in feminist studies and masculinity studies, and the claims of increases in recent years in female crime, especially that of violent crime.

Past studies explained gender and crime through psychological and biological aspects. However, now specific sociological theories analyze the gender differences when it comes to committing crime. Brezina's research focuses on the "general strain theory," specifically, on why males and females have a gap rate in crime. One view is that the gender gap of crime is associated with different strains and various types of experiences males and females go through. For instance, their socialization, life events, home life, and relationships differ from one another. Because of this, research suggests that boys and men are more closely related to crime and delinquency. Brezina argues that because boys are more exposed to harsh punishment from their parents while growing up, negative experiences at school, no support system, and homelessness, they have more freedom to commit a crime. Brezina states that some boys and men tend to see crime as acceptable because they favor their "internalized 'masculine' values."

Brezina argues that girls and women have limited opportunities to commit crime. They, for example, are more dedicated to family and friends, have higher parental supervision, and are less likely to link themselves to delinquent peers. Therefore, their strains would be high family demands and lose of friendship. This leads to them reacting to strain differently than males do. Instead of coping their strain with crime, they express it with their emotions to eliminate the stress. The emotional response females receive are fear, guilt, anxiety, or shame, which decreases their chances of committing a crime. In addition, girls and women have a great amount of social support, which also leads to lower rate of crime. The types of strain that males and females experience can be an understanding of why there is a gender gap in crime.

=== Sociobiological and evolutionary psychology perspective ===
Evolutionary psychology has proposed several evolutionary explanations for gender differences in aggressiveness. Males can increase their reproductive success by polygyny which will lead the competition with other males over females. If the mother died, this may have had more serious consequences for a child than if the father died in the ancestral environment since there is a tendency for greater parental investments and caring for children by females than by males. Greater caring for children also leads to difficulty leaving them in order to either fight or flee. Anne Campbell writes that females may thus avoid direct physical aggressiveness and instead use strategies such as "friendship termination, gossiping, ostracism, and stigmatization".

Psychologist and professor Mark van Vugt, from VU University at Amsterdam, Netherlands, has argued that males have evolved more aggressive and group-oriented in order to gain access to resources, territories, mates and higher status. His theory the Male Warrior hypothesis explains that males throughout hominid history have evolved to form coalitions or groups in order to engage in inter-group aggression and increase their chances of acquiring resources, mates and territory. Vugt argues that this evolved male social dynamic explains the human history of war to modern day gang rivalry which is under a process of male on male competition in order to gain resources and potential mates.

There are two theories on the role of testosterone in aggression and competition among males. The first one is the Challenge hypothesis which states that testosterone would increase during puberty thus facilitating reproductive and competitive behaviour which would include aggression as a result of evolution. Thus it is the challenge of competition in relation to testosterone among males of the species that facilitates aggression and violence. Studies conducted have found direct correlation between testosterone and dominance especially among the most violent criminals in prison who had the highest testosterone levels. The same research also found fathers (those outside competitive environments) had the lowest testosterone levels compared to other males. The second theory is also similar and is known as the evolutionary neuroandrogenic (ENA) theory of male aggression. Testosterone and other androgens have evolved to masculinize a brain in order to be competitive even as far as being a risk to harming others. By doing so, individuals with masculinized brains as a result of pre-natal and adult life testosterone and androgens enhance their resource acquiring abilities in order to survive, attract and copulate with mates as much as possible. Thus, crime can be seen as an extreme form of adaptation to gain status and acquire more resources. Many other researchers have agreed with this and have stated that criminal behavior is an expression of inter-male competition in mating efforts and resource seeking since there is a huge correlation between criminals and fathering children at younger ages.

=== Neurobiology ===
Neurobiological abnormalities associated with criminality also show sex differences. One study found that sex differences in antisocial behaviour were reduced by 77% when controlling sex difference in the grey matter of the orbitofrontal cortex.

=== Psychopathology ===
Psychological traits and syndromes associated with criminal and antisocial behaviour are more frequent in men. Examples include antisocial and narcissistic personality disorders, substance use disorders, psychopathy, and grandiose narcissism.

== Aggression and violence among peers and in relationships ==
Women are more likely to use direct aggression in private, where other people cannot see them, and are more likely to use indirect aggression (such as passive-aggressive behavior) in public. Men are more likely to be the targets of displays of aggression and provocation than women. Studies by Bettencourt and Miller show that when provocation is controlled for, sex differences in aggression are greatly reduced. They argue that this shows that gender-role norms play a large part in the differences in aggressive behavior between men and women.

According to the 2015 International Encyclopedia of the Social & Behavioral Sciences, sex differences in aggression is one of the most robust and oldest findings in psychology. Past meta-analyses in the encyclopedia found males regardless of age engaged in more physical and verbal aggression while small effect for females engaging in more indirect aggression such as rumor spreading or gossiping. It also found males tend to engage in more unprovoked aggression at higher frequency than females. This replicated another 2007 meta-analysis of 148 studies in the journal Child Development which found greater male aggression in childhood and adolescence. This analysis also conforms with the Oxford Handbook of Evolutionary Psychology which reviewed past analysis and found greater male use in verbal and physical aggression with the difference being greater in the physical type. A meta-analysis of 122 studies published in the journal of Aggressive Behavior found males are more likely to cyberbully than females, although the difference was small. Difference also showed that females reported more cyberbullying behavior during mid-adolescence while males showed more cyberbullying behavior at late adolescence.

While the literature generally finds that women are more commonly the victims of domestic violence, some research suggests that rates of physical aggression within the context of dating and marriage tend to be similar for men and women, or that women are more likely to commit domestic violence against a partner; this is known as gender symmetry. However, such data generally shows that men tend to inflict the greater share of injuries. Critics have used studies such as Dekeseredy et al. to argue that "studies finding about equal rates of violence by women in relationships are misleading because they fail to place the violence in context; in other words, there is a difference between someone who uses violence to fight back or defend oneself and someone who initiates an unprovoked assault."

One study argued that it was the above-cited Dekeseredy et al. that in fact improperly contextualized partner violence; Dekeseredy's campus study was based around asking women and only women if their violence was in self-defense, and not permitting the same for men. This results in counting men who had defended themselves as perpetrators, and counting women who may have engaged in ex post facto justification of their violence, a noted trait of psychological abuse, as victims. The study further found that studies from the US Department of Justice did not contextualize violence simply by not counting women perpetrators until forced to by the US Centers for Disease Control (CDC). Other studies that decontextualized partner violence included labeling aggregate findings of motivations for violence that included the desire to coerce or control the partner or being angry with the partner as "striking back" when such questions revealed that women scored equal to or higher than men in desires to use violence out of simple anger or to coerce and control the partner. This, however, is contradicted by other reviews which found women's primary motivation were triggered by anger or self-defense while men's motivation was more about control.

Some studies have also postulated that when other factors such as allowing both or neither gender to claim self-defense, or simply including male victims and female perpetrators in the sample, the results were at or near parity for perpetrators and victims, with the results near parity sometimes favoring females and sometimes favoring males. Another large study reveals that women are between two and three times as likely to be the offender in non-reciprocal partner violence. The study suggests that while women are far more prone to be the sole offender, reciprocal violence where both partners use violence has higher frequency of serious injuries, and that these injuries more often have female victims than male.

A 2008 review published in the journal Violence and Victims found that although less serious situation violence or altercation was equal for both genders, more serious and violent abuse was perpetrated by men. It was also found that women's physical violence was more likely motivated by self-defense or fear while men's was motivated by control. A 2011 systematic review from the journal of Trauma Violence Abuse also found that the common motives for female on male domestic violence were anger, a need for attention, or as a response to their partner's own violence. Another 2011 review published in the journal of Aggression and Violent Behavior also found that although minor domestic violence was equal, more severe violence was perpetrated by men. It was also found that men were more likely to beat up, choke or strangle their partners, while women were more likely to throw something at their partner, slap, kick, punch, or hit with an object.

== Court system ==
One study has noted substantial differences in the treatment and behavior of defendants in the courts on the basis of gender; female criminologist Frances Heidensohn postulates that for judges and juries it is often "impossible to isolate the circumstances that the defendant is a woman from the circumstances that she can also be a widow, a mother, attractive, or may cry on the stand." Furthermore, male and female defendants in court have reported being advised to conduct themselves differently in accordance with their gender; women in particular recall being advised to express "mute passivity," whereas men are encouraged to "assert themselves" in cross-examinations and testimony.

== Statistics ==
=== In the United States ===
In the United States, men are much more likely to be incarcerated than women. More than 9 times as many men (5,037,000) as women (581,000) had ever at one time been incarcerated in a State or Federal prison at year end 2001. According to the Bureau of Justice Statistics, males experienced higher victimization rates than females for all types of violent crime except rape or other sexual assault.

In 2014, more than 73% of those arrested in the US were males. Men accounted for 80.4 percent of persons arrested for violent crime and 62.9 percent of those arrested for property crime. In 2011, the United States Department of Justice compiled homicide statistics in the United States between 1980 and 2008. That study showed the following:

- Males were convicted of the vast majority of homicides in the United States, representing 89.5% of the total number of offenders.
- Young adult black males had the highest homicide conviction rate compared to offenders in other racial and sex categories.
- White females of all ages had the lowest conviction rates of any racial or age groups; however, these statistics do not isolate Asian offenders from a diverse 'other' category. Asian women are considerably less likely to commit homicide than white American women.
- Of children under age 5 killed by a parent, the rate for biological father conviction was slightly higher than for biological mothers.
- However, of children under 5 killed by someone other than their parent, 80% of the people that were convicted were males.
- Victimization rates for both males and females have been relatively stable since 2000.
- Males were more likely to be murder victims (76.8%).
- Females were most likely to be victims of domestic homicides (63.7%) and sex-related homicides (81.7%)
- Males were most likely to be victims of drug-related (90.5%) and gang-related homicides (94.6%).

2011 arrest data in suburban areas from the FBI:

- Males constituted 98.9% of those arrested for forcible rape
- Males constituted 87.9% of those arrested for robbery
- Males constituted 85.0% of those arrested for burglary
- Males constituted 83.0% of those arrested for arson.
- Males constituted 81.7% of those arrested for vandalism.
- Males constituted 81.5% of those arrested for motor-vehicle theft.
- Males constituted 79.7% of those arrested for offenses against family and children.
- Males constituted 77.8% of those arrested for aggravated assault
- Males constituted 58.7% of those arrested for fraud.
- Males constituted 57.3% of those arrested for larceny-theft.
- Males constituted 51.3% of those arrested for embezzlement.

From 2003 to 2012, there was a decrease in the rate of crime overall, but an increase in crimes committed by women. There was an increase in arrest rate for women of 2.9% but a decrease in arrest rate for men of 12.7%. This demonstrates an increase in arrests for women which only slightly offsets the decrease in arrest for men resulting in a decrease overall in arrest rate in the United States. Arrests rates for women had a sizable increase in the following crimes: robbery (+20.2%), larceny-theft (+29.6%), and arson – property crime (+24.7%). The trend results from 2003 to 2012 showed the vast majority of crimes were still committed by men with around 88% of homicides and 75% of all legal felonies. According to government statistics from the US Department of Justice, male perpetrators constituted 96% of federal prosecution on domestic violence. Another report by the US department of Justice on non-fatal domestic violence from 2003 to 2012 found that 76 percent of domestic violence was committed against women and 24 percent were committed against men.

=== In Canada ===
According to a Canadian Public Health Agency report, the rate of violent crime doubled among male youth during the late 1980s and 1990s, while it almost tripled among female youth. It rose for the latter from 2.2 per 1,000 in 1988 to a peak of 5.6 per 1,000 in 1996, and began to decline in 1999. Some researchers have suggested that the increase on crime statistics could be partly explained by the stricter approach to schoolyard fights and bullying, leading to a criminalization of behaviors now defined as "assault" behaviors (while they were simply negatively perceived before). The increase in the proportion of female violent crime would thus be explained more by a change in law enforcement policies than by effective behavior of the population itself. According to the report aforementioned, "Evidence suggests that aggressive and violent behavior in children is linked to family and social factors, such as social and financial deprivation; harsh and inconsistent parenting; parents' marital problems; family violence, whether between parents, by parents toward children or between siblings; poor parental mental health; physical and sexual abuse; and alcoholism, drug dependency or other substance misuse by parents or other family members."

Gender statistics Canada by total charged annual crimes (2002):

- Adult males – 326,536
- Adult females – 71,058
- Young males (12–17) – 74,513
- Youth females (12–17) – 24, 487

Victims of person crimes in Canada by gender, per 100,000 residents (2008)
Crime	Female	Male	Result
Aggravated assault	119	233	Males are 2 times more likely
Forcible confinement	22	7	Females are 3.1 times more likely
Homicide & attempted murder	2	7	Males are 3.5 times more likely
Robbery	62	114	Males are 1.8 times more likely
Sexual assault	68	6	Females are 11.3 times more likely
Simple assault	576	484	Females are 1.2 times more likely
Uttering threats	156	184	Males are 1.2 times more likely
Criminal harassment	135	51	Females are 2.6 times more likely
Other assaults	16	62	Males are 3.9 times more likely
Other "person" crimes	1	2	Males are 2 times more likely

In 2013 and 2014, males accounted for 85% of those that have committed legal offenses and sent to provincial and territorial correctional services in Canada. Females account for 15 percent of overall committed legal offenses.

=== Worldwide homicide statistics by gender ===
According to the data given by the United Nations Office on Drugs and Crime, worldwide, 78.7% of homicide victims are male, and in 193 of the 202 listed countries or regions, males were more likely to be killed than females. In two, the ratio was 50:50 (Switzerland and British Virgin Islands), and in the remaining 7; Tonga, Iceland, Japan, New Zealand, Republic of Korea, Latvia and Hong Kong, females were more likely to be victims of homicides compared to males. A 2013 global study on homicide by the United Nations Office on Drugs and Crime found that males accounted for about 95 percent of all convicted homicide perpetrators worldwide. Also, according to the United Nations Office on Drugs and Crime, the percent of victims killed by their spouses or ex-spouses in 2011 were 77.4 percent women and 22.6 percent men in selected countries across Europe.

== See also ==
- Power-control theory of gender and delinquency
- Incarceration of women
- Race and crime in the United States
- Immigration and crime
- Race and crime

== Bibliography ==
- Campbell, Anne (1984). The Girls in the Gang: A Report from New York City (Olympic Marketing Corp) ISBN 978-0-631-13374-2
- Fisher, J. (1999). "Ethics Check". CMA Management Magazine, 36-37
- Heidensohn, F. (1995). Women and Crime. Basingstoke: MacMillan.
- Bibliography on "Girls and Violence" on the University of Glasgow's website
- Other bibliography concerning gender & crime with descriptions, from the Oxford University Press on-line resources
