= Roach (surname) =

Roach is an English and Irish surname of Norman origin, derived from the Old French roche (rock), and may refer to:

== Politics and government ==
- George Roach (fl. 1870s), Canadian politician
- George Roach (mayor) (died 1744), American politician
- John C. Roach, American jurist on the Kentucky Supreme Court
- William N. Roach (1840–1902), American politician

== Entertainment ==
- Alexandra Roach (born 1987), Welsh actress
- AJ Roach (born 1975), American singer-songwriter
- Archie Roach (1956–2022), Australian musician
- Ada Roach, American musical comedy actress
- Cameron Roach, British television Producer
- Gary D. Roach (born 1964), American film editor
- Hal Roach (1892–1992), American director & producer
- Hal Roach (comedian), Irish comedian
- Jay Roach (born 1957), American director and producer
- Law Roach (born 1978), American fashion stylist
- Martin Roach (born 1962), Canadian actor
- Max Roach (1924–2007), American drummer
- Patrick Roach (born 1969), Canadian actor
- Steve Roach (born 1955), American musician

== Academics and literature ==
- E. M. Roach (1915–1974), Tobagonian poet and playwright
- Kent Roach, Canadian professor
- Mary Roach (born 1959), American author on death and the metaphysical
- Stephen S. Roach (born 1945), American economist

== Sports ==
- Alan Roach (born 1966), American sports PA announcer
- Andy Roach (born 1973), American ice hockey defenseman
- Clifford Roach (1904–1988), Trinidadian cricketer
- Danny Roach (born 1982), Australian rules footballer
- Freddie Roach (boxing) (born 1960), American boxing trainer
- Jeremy Roach (born 2001), American basketball player
- John Ross Roach (1900–1973), Canadian ice hockey player (Goaltender)
- Kemar Roach (born 1988), Barbadian cricketer
- Kimmari Roach (born 1990), Jamaican sprinter
- Malcolm Roach (born 1998), American football player
- Melanie Roach (born 1974), US-American weightlifter of the 53-kg-class
- Mel Roach (1933–2023), American baseball player
- Michael Roach (footballer) (born 1958), Australian rules footballer
- Mickey Roach (1895–1977), American hockey player
- Pat Roach (1937–2004), British wrestler
- Paul Roach (1927–2023), American football coach
- Ruth Roach (1896–1986), American rodeo performer
- Skel Roach (1871–1958), American baseball player and coach
- Steve Roach (born 1962), Australian rugby league player
- Tom Roach (footballer) (born 1985), Australian rules footballer
- Trevor Roach (born 1992), American football player

== Other ==
- Colin Roach, British man allegedly murdered by police in 1983
- David Roach (disambiguation), multiple people
- Franklin E. Roach (1905–1993), American astronomer, professor, ufologist, and a father of aeronomy
- James Terry Roach (died 1986), American criminal
- John Roach (disambiguation), multiple people
- Mattea Roach (born 1998), Canadian tutor and Jeopardy! champion
- Philip Roach (1881–1976), U.S. Coast Guard commodore
- Stephen S. Roach (born 1945), American economist
- Vickie Roach (born 1958), Aboriginal Australian activist

== Fictional characters ==
- Roderick Roach
- Steven Roach, an alias from a person claiming to have made Polybius.
- Ted Roach, police detective in The Bill

== See also ==
- Roach (disambiguation)
- Roache
- Roche (disambiguation)
