= List of Kid vs. Kat episodes =

The following is a list of episodes for the YTV animated series, Kid vs. Kat. Created by Rob Boutilier, the series was produced by Studio B Productions, in association with YTV and Jetix Europe. It was produced with Disney XD Europe for its second season. A total of 52 episodes aired between October 25, 2008, to June 4, 2011.

== Series overview ==
Season	Segments	Episodes	Originally released	
Season	Segments	Episodes	First released	Last released
1	51	26	October 25, 2008	November 30, 2009
Shorts	N/A	27	November 4, 2008	June 5, 2011
2	50	26	September 11, 2010	June 4, 2011

== Episodes ==
=== Season 1 (2008–09) ===
Season 1 premiered on October 25, 2008, and ended on November 30, 2009.

No. overall	No. in season	Title	Directed by	Written by	Original release date	Prod. code
1	1	""Let the Games Begin""	Rob Boutilier	Written by : Michael Lahay; Storyboarded by : Rob Boutilier	October 25, 2008 (Note: This episode first aired in the United States on February 21, 2009.)	101
1	1	""Night of the Zombie Kat""	Rob Boutilier	Written by : Shane Simmons; Storyboarded by : Jocelan Thiessen and Kenny Park	October 25, 2008	101
"Let the Games Begin": Coop discovers his life will never be the same again when his spoiled little sister, Millie, brings home an alien cat and Coop blows up his collar. "Night of the Zombie Kat": Coop watches a horror movie, then after, Kat uses flour to make his skin white and scare Coop.
2	2	""Trespassers Will Be Persecuted""	Rob Boutilier	Written by : Michael Lahay; Storyboarded by : Kenny Park	December 30, 2008 (Note: This episode first aired in the United States on February 21, 2009.)	102
2	2	""Me-Oh Me-Oh Meow""	Josh Mepham	Written by : Shane Simmons; Storyboarded by : Kervin Faria	December 30, 2008	102
"Trespassers Will Be Persecuted": Old Lady Munson lays down the law: Coop is not to set foot into her yard, but Kat makes sure he crosses the line again, again, and again. "Me-Oh Me-Oh Meow": After meowing too much, Kat is forced to wear a special collar, but in the end Kat straps the collar onto Coop's foot.
3	3	""Do Not Fort Sake Me""	Josh Mepham	Written by : Shelley Hoffman and Robert Pincombe; Storyboarded by : Karen Lloyd	February 28, 2009	103
3	3	""Cookie D'Uh""	Rob Boutilier	Written by : Louise Moon; Storyboarded by : Pat Pakula	February 28, 2009	103
"Do Not Fort Sake Me": Coop and Dennis build a tree fort in the backyard. Kat, taking advantage of how tall the fort is, uses it to power up his collar and start communicating with other "Kats". "Cookie D'Uh": Coop gets accused of stealing cookies.
4	4	""Nip/Duck""	Rob Boutilier	Written by : Shane Simmons; Storyboarded by : Kent Webb	March 7, 2009	104
4	4	""Search and De-Toy""	Josh Mepham	Written by : Shelley Hoffman and Robert Pincombe; Storyboarded by : Jay Horychun	March 7, 2009	104
"Nip/Duck": Coop is determined to expose the truth about Kat by showing his X-rays to Dad and Millie. "Search and De-Toy": Coop comes up with a plan to rescue his dad's (possibly his) toy helicopter from Old Lady Munson.
5	5	""Flu the Coop""	Josh Mepham	Written by : Kendra Hibbert; Storyboarded by : Kevin Schmid	March 14, 2009	105
5	5	""Class Act""	Rob Boutilier	Written by : Leslie Mildiner; Storyboarded by : Jeff Barker	March 14, 2009	105
"Flu the Coop": Tensions mount when Coop is sick and Kat is none too pleased because his germs irritate Kat's skin. "Class Act": Coop finds a magic kit in the House of Swap and uses it to do a magic act to make Kat disappear forever.
6	6	""Hypnokat""	Rob Boutilier	Written by : Sean Minogue; Storyboarded by : Jocelan Thiessen	March 21, 2009	106
6	6	""The Allergy""	Josh Mepham	Written by : Ben Joseph; Storyboarded by : Kent Webb	March 21, 2009	106
"Hypnokat": Kat's new toy mouse hypnotizes the other cats in the neighborhood, and Kat seizes the opportunity to create his own cat army. "The Allergy": Coop convinces Dad that he's allergic to Kat so Dad will get rid of the pesky feline for good. Kat turns the tables on Coop, convincing Dad that he's allergic to Coop as well!
7	7	""Just Me and Glue""	Josh Mepham	Written by : Shelley Hoffman and Robert Pincombe; Storyboarded by : Jamie LeClaire	March 28, 2009	107
7	7	""You'll Be Show Sorry""	Rob Boutilier	Written by : Roger Fredericks; Storyboarded by : Kenny Park	March 28, 2009	107
"Just Me and Glue": When Coop and Kat get glued hand to paw, they are forced to spend the day together. Kat turns out to be a big help in putting together Coop's new Mechanizor Warrior model robot until Coop realizes Kat has programmed it to destroy Coop, but Kat will also be destroyed. "You'll Be Show Sorry": When a contest for pets is announced in Bootsville, Coop subscribes Kat because the winner wins a trip around the world. However, Coop regrets this when he realizes he will be taking the trip with Kat if he wins.
8	8	""How the Test Was Won""	Rob Boutilier	Written by : Josh Gal; Storyboarded by : Kervin Faria	April 4, 2009	108
8	8	""I'm Okay, You're a Kat""	Josh Mepham	Written by : Louise Moon; Storyboarded by : Karen Lloyd	April 4, 2009	108
"How the Test Was Won": As Coop prepares for a big test, Kat comes up with multiple ways to distract him from studying, which in the end, Kat ironically helps Coop remember the things he should study thus having a B+ on the test. "I'm Okay, You're a Kat": Coop discovers a self-help motivational tape in the House of Swap and turns his life around by listening to it while he sleeps, until Kat messes with the tape to make it say bad things to him instead. Now it's up to Coop to use the tapes to fight evil Kat with an even more evil Coop!
9	9	""Dial "B" for Babysitter""	Rob Boutilier	Written by : Dan Franklin; Storyboarded by : Jocelan Thiessen	April 11, 2009	110
9	9	""The Grass is Always Meaner""	Josh Mepham	Written by : Louise Moon; Storyboarded by : Jay Horychun	April 11, 2009	110
"Dial "B" for Babysitter": Coop has his work cut out for him when he's forced to babysit Kat, Old Lady Munson, and her dog Growler. "The Grass is Always Meaner": Coop comes up with a plan to make money for a Captain Blasteroid Helmet by cutting Old Lady Munson's lawn; Kat tries to stop Coop and Dennis by making the grass grow.
10	10	""One Big, Happy Family""	Josh Mepham	Written by : Kendra Hibbert; Storyboarded by : Kevin Schmid	April 18, 2009	111
10	10	""Happy Campers""	Rob Boutilier	Written by : Shelley Hoffman and Robert Pincombe; Storyboarded by : Kervin Faria	April 18, 2009	111
"One Big, Happy Family": Coop and his family take a family photo at the House of Swap, but Kat tries to make Coop look bad. "Happy Campers": Dad competes with Dennis' father as to who's the best camper during a family weekend in the woods. Coop and Dennis use their knowledge of the forest to lead Kat into escalating confrontations with nature.
11	11	""U.F. Float""	Blair Peters	Written by : Louise Moon; Storyboarded by : Kenny Park	April 25, 2009	112
11	11	""Play N'Ice""	Greg Sullivan	Written by : Kendra Hibbert; Storyboarded by : Jay Horychun	April 25, 2009	112
"U.F. Float": Bootsville's annual parade has a Spaced Out theme this year and Dad wants to advertise the House of Swap with a Flying Saucer float. "Play N'Ice": Dad builds an ice palace and rink in the backyard during a snowy day. Meanwhile, Coop tries to find a way into Kat's secret base.
12	12	""House of Scream""	Rob Boutilier	Written by : Roger Fredericks; Storyboarded by : Jamie LeClaire	May 2, 2009	113
12	12	""Planter's Warp""	Josh Mepham	Written by : Leslie Mildiner; Storyboarded by : Kent Webb	May 2, 2009	113
"House of Scream": Kat takes advantage of Dad turning the House of Swap into a horror fun house by going for real blood. "Planter's Warp": Kat uses his alien technology to turn the plants in the backyard into monsters.
13	13	""Curse of Tutankitty's Tomb""	Rob Boutilier	Written by : Kendra Hibbert; Storyboarded by : Clio Chiang	May 9, 2009	114
13	13	""Pet Peeved""	Greg Sullivan	Written by : Roger Fredericks; Storyboarded by : Jocelan Thiessen	May 9, 2009	114
"Curse of Tutankitty's Tomb": Egyptian artifacts at the museum turn out to be high-tech relics from Kat's world. "Pet Peeved": When Millie finds a new school friend exactly like her named Molly, she starts to ignore Kat, causing Kat to run away.
14	14	""Don't Give Me No Static""	Josh Mepham	Written by : Roger Fredericks; Storyboarded by : Kervin Faria	May 16, 2009	115
14	14	""Storm Drained""	Greg Sullivan	Written by : Leslie Mildiner; Storyboarded by : Pat Pakula	May 16, 2009	115
"Don't Give Me No Static": Desperate for a completed science project, Coop borrows one of Kat's weird machines without knowing what it does. "Storm Drained": Coop is determined to have Bootsville win against Timber Lane in a baseball game.
15	15	""Fishy Frisky Business""	Greg Sullivan	Written by : Shelley Hoffman and Robert Pincombe; Storyboarded by : Karen Lloyd	May 30, 2009	116
15	15	""Teed Off""	Rob Boutilier	Written by : Shelley Hoffman and Robert Pincombe; Storyboarded by : Kenny Park	May 30, 2009	116
"Fishy Frisky Business": On a family shopping trip, Kat gets Coop banned from the grocery store. "Teed Off": Dennis and Coop's fathers encourage them to revive a neighborhood tradition, the "round the block" golf challenge.
16	16	""Something Fishy in Owl Lake""	Josh Mepham	Written by : Vito Viscomi; Storyboarded by : Karen Lloyd	June 6, 2009	118
16	16	""Dire Education""	Rob Boutilier	Written by : Steven Wright; Storyboarded by : Clio Chiang	June 6, 2009	118
"Something Fishy in Owl Lake": The Burtonburgers face friends, neighbours, and each other in a local fishing derby. "Dire Education": Dad comes to school to shadow the kids on Parents' Day; Millie takes Kat to show-and-tell.
17	17	""Crouching Cooper, Hidden Kat""	Rob Boutilier	Written by : Louise Moon; Storyboarded by : Jay Horychun	June 13, 2009	119
17	17	""Tom-Kat Foolery""	Josh Mepham	Story by : Kendra Hibbert; Teleplay by : Betty Quan; Storyboarded by : Dennis Crawford	June 13, 2009	119
"Crouching Cooper, Hidden Kat": When Kat and Millie embarrass Coop in front of the school by flipping him, he turns to Dennis for martial arts lessons. "Tom-Kat Foolery": Coop's April Fool's Day jokes have the entire town not believing a word he says, so how can Coop stop what seems to be a Kat-led UFO invasion when even Dennis assumes it to be Coop's biggest joke yet?
18	18	""In Dog We Trust""	Josh Mepham	Written by : Steven Wright; Storyboarded by : Jamie LeClaire	June 20, 2009	120
18	18	""Catch My Drift""	Rob Boutilier	Written by : Shelley Hoffman and Robert Pincombe; Storyboarded by : Kevin Schmid	June 20, 2009	120
"In Dog We Trust": Seeing how freaked out Kat gets by a huge stray dog, Coop adopts it as his pet and bodyguard, but the dog is a lot more responsibility than he thought, especially after Coop's plan backfires, as Kat retrains it to destroy the house. "Catch My Drift": Kat overcomes his fear of snow to make sure Coop gets chilly in the Demolition Run toboggan challenge.
19	19	""Suddenly Last Slammer""	Greg Sullivan	Written by : Shelley Hoffman and Robert Pincombe; Storyboarded by : Pat Pakula	June 27, 2009	121
19	19	""The Kitty Vanishes""	Josh Mepham	Written by : Louise Moon; Storyboarded by : Kenny Park	June 27, 2009	121
"Suddenly Last Slammer": The police and Old Lady Munson accuse Coop and his friends of "waking the neighborhood". "The Kitty Vanishes": Kat struggles to perfect a teleporter to steal and transfer seemingly unimportant items across space to his home.
20	20	""Capture the Kat""	Rob Boutilier	Written by : Heather Jackson; Storyboarded by : Kent Webb	July 11, 2009	122
20	20	""Outer Space Case""	Josh Mepham	Written by : Shelley Hoffman and Robert Pincombe; Storyboarded by : Clio Chiang	July 11, 2009	122
"Capture the Kat": Kat wants a day off, but Coop and the gang play capture the flag right through to his secret forest oasis. "Outer Space Case": When Old Lady Munson shows an unusual interest in Coop and Dennis' favorite show, they become equally obsessed with finding out why she likes it.
21	21	""Buzz Off!""	Josh Mepham	Story by : Betty Quan; Teleplay by : Shelley Hoffman and Robert Pincombe; Storyboarded by : Karen Lloyd	July 18, 2009	123
21	21	""Fat Kat""	Rob Boutilier	Written by : Heather Jackson; Storyboarded by : Kevin Schmid	July 18, 2009	123
"Buzz Off!": It's time for the annual Bootsville Day festival celebrating the town's founding. After Kat sees how much the mosquitoes annoy everyone, he uses his alien technology to make them grow huge! "Fat Kat": Kat becomes fat after eating too much human food when he sends all of his cat food to his home planet. When he becomes too fat to attack Coop, Coop must keep him fat.
22	22	""Kat Whisperer""	Rob Boutilier	Written by : Louise Moon; Storyboarded by : Kevin Schmid, Kenny Park and Dennis Crawford	July 25, 2009	124
22	22	""Bend It Like Burtonburger""	Josh Mepham	Written by : Shelley Hoffman and Robert Pincombe; Storyboarded by : Jay Horychun	July 25, 2009	124
"Kat Whisperer": After Coop uses cat whispering to make Kat into his new best friend, he becomes a pal to all animals. "Bend It Like Burtonburger": Coop and Dennis join the soccer team but Coop would rather show off than use teamwork.
23	23	""Stall That Jazz""	Josh Mepham	Written by : Adrian Raeside; Storyboarded by : Pat Pakula and Jay Horychun	July 31, 2009	125
23	23	""Under Destruction""	Rob Boutilier	Written by : Shelley Hoffman and Robert Pincombe; Storyboarded by : Dennis Crawford	July 31, 2009	125
"Stall That Jazz": When Kat's listening transmitter becomes lodged in his ear, his hearing becomes super sensitive. "Under Destruction": After Kat's latest tantrum almost destroys the house, Dad starts his own extreme renovation.
24	24	""Beware the Were-Coop""	Josh Mepham	Written by : Shane Simmons; Storyboarded by : Pat Pakula	October 10, 2009	109
24	24	""Trick or Threat""	Rob Boutilier	Written by : Steven Wright; Storyboarded by : Clio Chiang	October 10, 2009	109
"Beware the Were-Coop": After Kat scratches Coop under a full moon of Halloween, Dennis believes that Coop is turning into a werecat. "Trick or Threat": On Halloween, Coop and Dennis plan on trick or treating...much to Kat's liking, as he tries to communicate with his home planet, Kat Nebula.
25	25	""Hack Kattack""	Josh Mepham	Written by : Shelley Hoffman and Robert Pincombe; Storyboarded by : Jocelan Thiessen	October 17, 2009	126
25	25	""It's a Rocket, Man""	Rob Boutilier	Written by : Roger Fredericks; Storyboarded by : Kervin Faria	October 17, 2009	126
"Hack Kattack": Kat's attempts to hack satellites for a mind control broadcast are given a leg up by Dennis' new universal remote control and satellite dish. "It's a Rocket, Man": Coop joins the Bootsville Rocket Club and with a little secret help from Kat, he's soon the star member, but when Coop learns Kat is going to use his rocket to destroy a satellite, the only way Coop can stop him is to destroy his own record breaking flight.
26	26	"Kid vs. Kat vs. Christmas"	Rob Boutilier	Written by : Shelley Hoffman and Robert Pincombe; Storyboarded by : Kent Webb and Jocelan Thiessen	November 30, 2009	117
Coop's hopes of a normal Christmas are shattered by the fact that Kat is constantly getting him in trouble; it is revealed that Kat really misses his family back at his home planet. Coop and Millie's grandparents are expected to visit for the Christmas, but many troubles cause them to be late.

=== Season 2 (2010–11) ===
Season 2 premiered on September 11, 2010, and ended on June 4, 2011.

No. overall	No. in season	Title	Directed by	Written by	Original release date	Prod. code
27	1	""Something About Fiona""	Rob Boutilier and Josh Mepham	Written by : Louise Moon; Storyboarded by : Karen Lloyd	September 11, 2010	201
27	1	""Tickled Pink""	Rob Boutilier and Josh Mepham	Written by : Vito Viscomi; Storyboarded by : Jason Horychun	September 11, 2010	201
"Something About Fiona": Coop falls for Old Lady Munson's niece Fiona, and Kat does everything he can to make Coop look bad. "Tickled Pink": When Millie tickles Mr. Kat's "tickle spot", he goes into a blissful state that renders him helpless as an alien invader. When Kat's empire find out about this, they send a robot to destroy Millie.
28	2	""Flea Brains""	Rob Boutilier and Josh Mepham	Written by : Marcy Brown & Dennis Haley; Storyboarded by : Sabrina Alberghetti, Josh Mepham & Mark Pudleiner	September 18, 2010	202
28	2	""Menace the Dennis""	Rob Boutilier and Josh Mepham	Written by : Peter Sauder; Storyboarded by : Jim Miller	September 18, 2010	202
"Flea Brains": Kat's swarm of flea-sized mind control robots hop into the ears of the people of Bootsville and soon they all want to destroy Coop. "Menace the Dennis": With Coop out of town, Kat wants to turn water into milk and Dennis comes to the rescue.
29	3	""Cheeks of Evil""	Rob Boutilier and Josh Mepham	Written by : J.D. Smith; Storyboarded by : Dennis Crawford	September 25, 2010	203
29	3	""Reap It and Weep""	Rob Boutilier and Josh Mepham	Written by : Richard Elliott & Simon Racioppa; Storyboarded by : Joel Dickie	September 25, 2010	203
"Cheeks of Evil": Millie brings home the class hamster, unaware that Mr. Kat hates hamsters. "Reap It and Weep": When Kat uses his growth ray to bury Bootsville in a catnip jungle, Coop is blamed by the irate Bootsville Gardening Club.
30	4	""Blasteroid Blues""	Rob Boutilier and Josh Mepham	Written by : Lienne Sawatsky & Dan Williams; Storyboarded by : James Wootton	October 2, 2010	204
30	4	""Rat-a-Phooey""	Rob Boutilier and Josh Mepham	Written by : Vito Viscomi; Storyboarded by : Pat Pakula	October 2, 2010	204
"Blasteroid Blues": Coop tries to stop the destruction of Massive Mart. "Rat-a-Phooey": Kat builds a Rat-ray gun, which he plans on using to turn Coop into a rat, but Dad gets zapped instead, so Coop hopes he can change Dad back... If he can catch him first!
31	5	""Trash Talking""	Rob Boutilier and Josh Mepham	Written by : Louise Moon; Storyboarded by : Todd K. Demong	October 9, 2010	205
31	5	""Over the Radar""	Rob Boutilier and Josh Mepham	Written by : Shane Simmons; Storyboarded by : Kent Webb	October 9, 2010	205
"Trash Talking": Coop and Dennis climb inside Kat's scratching post and discover Kat's alien technology has created an infinity within. While they are inside, the scratching post gets taken to the dump. "Over the Radar": Coop, Millie, and Dad are taken away to a top secret base to be interrogated, after a UFO investigator suspects they are aliens.
32	6	""Nuff Said""	Rob Boutilier and Josh Mepham	Written by : Shane Simmons; Storyboarded by : Karen Lloyd	October 16, 2010	206
32	6	""Rhymes with Coop""	Rob Boutilier and Josh Mepham	Written by : Brian Lasenby; Storyboarded by : Jason Horychun	October 16, 2010	206
"Nuff Said": After taking the fall for one too many of Kat's destructive escapades, Coop decides to let Kat have free rein to cause whatever destruction he wants. "Rhymes with Coop": Due to an "over-loading" problem on Kat Nebula, Kat plots to turn Bootsville Beach into a giant litter box.
33	7	""Bringin' the Heat""	Rob Boutilier and Josh Mepham	Written by : J.D. Smith; Storyboarded by : Jim Miller	October 23, 2010	207
33	7	""The Three Aarghs""	Rob Boutilier and Josh Mepham	Written by : Kendra Hibbert; Storyboarded by : Scott Underwood	October 23, 2010	207
"Bringin' the Heat": Kat’s devious magnifier satellite is causing a dangerous heat wave in Bootsville. "The Three Aarghs": Coop and Dennis compete with one another to reduce their carbon footprints.
34	8	""Kat to the Future""	Rob Boutilier and Josh Mepham	Written by : Marcy Brown & Dennis Haley; Storyboarded by : Joel Dickie and Dennis Crawford	November 6, 2010	208
"Kat to the Future Part One": Coop uses Kat's time machine to go back to the past and stop Millie from bringing Kat home, but ends up altering the future for the worse. "Kat to the Future Part Two": Coop tries to undo the Kat invasion, which he brought about by fooling with Kat's time machine.
35	9	""Down the Drain""	Rob Boutilier and Josh Mepham	Written by : Shane Simmons; Storyboarded by : Pat Pakula	November 13, 2010	209
35	9	""9 to 5 to Oblivion""	Rob Boutilier and Josh Mepham	Written by : Vito Viscomi; Storyboarded by : Jamie LeClaire & Sabrina Alberghetti	November 13, 2010	209
"Down the Drain": Coop becomes Dennis' wingman for a change, as they go in search of a "sewer-croc-baby". "9 to 5 to Oblivion": Coop breaks every window in Dennis' house, and is forced to work off his debt by working in Henry's store.
36	10	""When Bad Dogs Go Big""	Rob Boutilier and Josh Mepham	Written by : Shelley Hoffman & Robert Pincombe; Storyboarded by : Kent Webb	November 20, 2010	210
36	10	""The Bottyguard""	Rob Boutilier and Josh Mepham	Written by : Lienne Sawatsky & Dan Williams; Storyboarded by : Todd K. Demong	November 20, 2010	210
"When Bad Dogs Go Big": Growler swallows a Kat device which makes him grow to the size of a T-Rex. "The Bottyguard": Kat's malfunctioning spybot thinks Coop is its new master, and wants to protect him from Kat.
37	11	""Rebel with a Claw""	Rob Boutilier and Josh Mepham	Written by : Louise Moon; Storyboarded by : Karen Lloyd	November 27, 2010	211
37	11	""Swap Wrecked""	Rob Boutilier and Josh Mepham	Written by : Marcy Brown & Dennis Haley; Storyboarded by : Jason Horychun	November 27, 2010	211
"Rebel with a Claw": The Kat Kommander's rebellious son runs away to Earth, where he becomes a handful for Kat, and a danger to the human race. "Swap Wrecked": Dad accidentally swaps an assortment of Kat's weapons to the unwitting residents of Bootsville.
38	12	""Hit the Road""	Rob Boutilier and Josh Mepham	Written by : Shane Simmons; Storyboarded by : Jim Miller	December 4, 2010	212
38	12	""Never Cry Sheep""	Rob Boutilier and Josh Mepham	Written by : Louise Moon; Storyboarded by : Scott Underwood	December 4, 2010	212
"Hit the Road": Kat is left at a kennel while the Burtonburgers go on vacation. "Never Cry Sheep": Kat becomes obsessed with making the biggest yarn ball ever made, and starts rustling sheep to gather their wool.
39	13	""Kickin' Butler""	Rob Boutilier and Josh Mepham	Written by : Hugh Duffy; Storyboarded by : Joel Dickie	December 11, 2010	213
39	13	""You Kat See Me""	Rob Boutilier and Josh Mepham	Written by : Kendra Hibbert; Storyboarded by : Dennis Crawford	December 11, 2010	213
"Kickin' Butler": Dennis is accidentally knocked into a portal that sends him on a wild trip around the world. If Coop wants Kat to fix the device and bring Dennis back, Coop must be Kat's servant. "You Kat See Me": Kat makes himself invisible and causes trouble for Coop on the night he invites Fiona to dinner and when Dad invites Coop's teacher over for dinner.
40	14	""Keep on Rockin'""	Rob Boutilier and Josh Mepham	Written by : Ben Joseph; Storyboarded by : Todd K. Demong	March 12, 2011	215
40	14	""It's in the Bag""	Rob Boutilier and Josh Mepham	Written by : Mike Kiss; Storyboarded by : Kent Webb	March 12, 2011	215
"Keep on Rockin'": Coop's grandparents visit, so Dad buys them rocking chairs. However, it turns out they are adventure junkies who accept that Kat is an alien. "It's in the Bag": Coop searches for the last available bag of the feline's favorite food after the factory that makes it closes down so he can taunt Kat.
41	15	""King of the Pipsqueaks""	Rob Boutilier and Josh Mepham	Written by : Johnny John John Kearns; Storyboarded by : Jason Horychun	March 19, 2011	216
41	15	""Down the Creek""	Rob Boutilier and Josh Mepham	Written by : Shane Simmons; Storyboarded by : Karen Lloyd & Sabrina Alberghetti	March 19, 2011	216
"King of the Pipsqueaks": Old Lady Munson's garden gnomes come to life and mistake Coop as their leader. "Down the Creek": Old Lady Munson tells Millie creative stories about her adventures in the past.
42	16	""Turn the Other Cheeks""	Rob Boutilier and Josh Mepham	Written by : J.D. Smith; Storyboarded by : Scott Underwood	March 26, 2011	217
42	16	""Birthday Bashed""	Rob Boutilier and Josh Mepham	Written by : Louise Moon; Storyboarded by : Jim Miller	March 26, 2011	217
"Turn the Other Cheeks": The evil alien hamster Mr. Cheeks comes back to get revenge on his nemesis, Kat. "Birthday Bashed": Coop's birthday is here, and everyone is coming to his party, and Phoebe is trying to get rid of Fiona so she can have Coop to herself. Meanwhile, Kat tries to enjoy a virtual picnic in a secluded spot with his girlfriend, but the kids and Coop keep interfering.
43	17	""Mind Games""	Rob Boutilier and Josh Mepham	Written by : Miles Smith; Storyboarded by : Dennis Crawford	April 2, 2011	218
43	17	""Strange Kat on a Train""	Rob Boutilier and Josh Mepham	Written by : Doug Molitor; Storyboarded by : Joel Dickie	April 2, 2011	218
"Mind Games": Dad orders Coop to spend more quality time with Millie. Meanwhile Kat builds a telekinetic helmet, which Millie unknowingly takes control of. "Strange Kat on a Train": Coop goes on a train to buy something from a man named Old Herman, Unfortunately it turns out to be the evil alien hamster, Mr. Cheeks!
44	18	""Board Kat""	Rob Boutilier and Josh Mepham	Written by : Vito Viscomi; Storyboarded by : Steven Garcia	April 5, 2011	214
44	18	""The Treasure of Sierra Munson""	Rob Boutilier and Josh Mepham	Written by : Adrian Vershinin & Kirk E. Paul; Storyboarded by : Pat Pakula	April 5, 2011	214
"Board Kat": Coop and Kat fight over Kat's new lightning box generator and end up switching bodies. "The Treasure of Sierra Munson": Coop discovers buried treasure under Old Lady Munson's house.
45	19	""Fangs for the Memories""	Rob Boutilier and Josh Mepham	Written by : Shane Simmons; Storyboarded by : Steven Garcia	April 9, 2011	219
45	19	""Drive-In Me Crazy""	Rob Boutilier and Josh Mepham	Written by : Roger Fredericks; Storyboarded by : Pat Pakula	April 9, 2011	219
"Fangs for the Memories": Kat's memory eraser leads to Coop forgetting Kat is an evil alien, but Dad accidentally gets Coop's lost memories and suddenly knows the terrible truth. "Drive-In Me Crazy": At a drive-in theater, Kat builds a device that brings an assortment of movie monsters to life.
46	20	""Hair Brains""	Rob Boutilier and Josh Mepham	Written by : Shane Simmons; Storyboarded by : Todd K. Demong	April 16, 2011	220
46	20	""Hot Dog Day""	Rob Boutilier and Josh Mepham	Written by : Richard Elliott & Simon Racioppa; Storyboarded by : Kent Webb	April 16, 2011	220
"Hair Brains": Coop and Dennis battle Kat's army of living hairballs. "Hot Dog Day": It's Hot Dog Day, and Coop has the honor of being named Keeper of the Weiner Water. But Kat wants to ruin the most special day of the year.
47	21	""Amazing Feet of Strength""	Rob Boutilier and Josh Mepham	Written by : Roger Fredericks; Storyboarded by : Jason Horychun	April 23, 2011	221
47	21	""Me Coop, You Kat""	Rob Boutilier and Josh Mepham	Written by : Louise Moon; Storyboarded by : Karen Lloyd	April 23, 2011	221
"Amazing Feet of Strength": Kat soups up Coop's new soccer shoes to allow the wearer to run faster and jump higher, and Coop wears the shoes in the championship game. "Me Coop, You Kat": Kat turns Coop into a caveman, hoping his lowered intelligence will make him easier to outsmart. Now Dennis must change Coop back to normal.
48	22	""You Scream, I Scream""	Rob Boutilier and Josh Mepham	Written by : Shelley Hoffman & Robert Pincombe; Storyboarded by : Scott Underwood	April 30, 2011	222
48	22	""Good Luck Harm""	Rob Boutilier and Josh Mepham	Written by : Kendra Hibbert; Storyboarded by : Jim Miller & Dave Pemberton	April 30, 2011	222
"You Scream, I Scream": Coop takes on the teenage bully who pedals the Curly Swirl Ice Cream cart, and forgets to pay attention to Kat's latest evil plans. "Good Luck Harm": Kat makes himself a high-powered good luck charm, which means bad luck for Coop.
49	23	""Bootsville's Most Wanted""	Rob Boutilier and Josh Mepham	Written by : Greg Sullivan; Storyboarded by : Dennis Crawford	May 7, 2011	223
49	23	""Kat of Diamonds""	Rob Boutilier and Josh Mepham	Written by : Louise Moon; Storyboarded by : Joel Dickie	May 7, 2011	223
"Bootsville's Most Wanted": Buck Diamond, an Animal Protection Officer, declares Coop "Bootsville's Most Wanted". "Kat of Diamonds": Coop and Fiona have to settle their argument before they can work together to stop Kat in his evil tracks when he steals a valuable diamond.
50	24	""Coop D'Etat""	Rob Boutilier and Josh Mepham	Written by : Shane Simmons; Storyboarded by : Steven Garcia	May 14, 2011	224
50	24	""The Incredible Shrinking Coop""	Rob Boutilier and Josh Mepham	Written by : Marcy Brown & Dennis Haley; Storyboarded by : Pat Pakula	May 14, 2011	224
"Coop D'Etat": Kat and Old Lady Munson show up at school where they work together to make Coop's life miserable. "The Incredible Shrinking Coop": Kat shrinks Coop and Dennis down to size and tries to squash them like bugs, which makes it hard for Coop to do something big for Dad for Father's Day.
51	25	""Who's Haunting Who?""	Rob Boutilier and Josh Mepham	Written by : Shelley Hoffman & Robert Pincombe; Storyboarded by : Todd K. Demong	May 21, 2011	225
51	25	""It's All in Your Head""	Rob Boutilier and Josh Mepham	Written by : Shane Simmons; Storyboarded by : Kent Webb	May 21, 2011	225
"Who's Haunting Who?": Kat thinks the haunted LeBoot Mansion will be the perfect place to build an inter-space teleporter. "It's All in Your Head": Kat tries to control the mind of Agent Neapolitan to sabotage a new satellite defense system, but his plan backfires when squirrels attack him.
52	26	"The Kat Went Back"	Rob Boutilier and Josh Mepham	Written by : Vito Viscomi; Storyboarded by : Karen Lloyd, Kent Webb, Jason Horychun & Dennis Crawford	June 4, 2011	226
"The Kat Went Back Part One": When Kat is replaced for incompetence, the Robo-Kat-Kops that are sent to take him home also capture Coop, Dennis, Fiona, Millie, Lorne, and Harley and take them to Kat Nebula. "The Kat Went Back Part Two": Coop and the rest of the kids need Kat's help to escape Kat Nebula. Will he give it?

== Shorts ==
The series was accompanied by a total of 27 shorts. Season 1 featured 13 shorts while Season 2 had 14.

=== Season 1 (2008–10) ===
These shorts were directed by Greg Sullivan and Garnet Syberg-Olsen and written by Shelley Hoffman & Robert Pincombe.

No.	Title	Storyboard by	Original release date
1	"All Washed Up"	Tim Packfold	November 4, 2008
Coop and Kat cause trouble when they have to bathe together.
2	"Catboy Update"	Jayson Thiessen	April 18, 2009
Kat disturbs Coop as he tries to clean the backyard.
3	"Dental Damage"	Jayson Thiessen	April 18, 2009
Coop and Kat cause trouble when they are at the dentist's.
4	"Don't Toy with Me!"	Dan Hughes	November 8, 2009
When the Burtonburgers go to the toy store, Coop and Kat fight and destroy everything.
5	"Extra Special Delivery"	Sabrina Alberghetti	May 8, 2010
When a baseball ball ends up in Phoebe's house, Coop goes to catch it, and Kat tries to disturb him.
6	"Fishy Frisky Bitty Kitty"	Jamie LeClaire	May 8, 2010
The new Fishy Frisky Bitty Kitty Snacks make Kat daydream and destroy everything in the house.
7	"Fumblebee"	Tim Packford	May 8, 2010
Kat tries to destroy a bee who won't leave him alone.
8	"Kaponk!"	Jamie LeClaire	May 8, 2010
Coop tries to beat his record on the paddleball, but Kat is trying to sabotage Coop from breaking the paddleball record.
9	"Movie Mayhem"	Dan Hughes	May 8, 2010
Kat disturbs Coop when he is watching a Captain Blasteroid film.
10	"Pasta Disasta"	Dan Hughes	May 8, 2010
Coop and Kat start a food fight in an Italian restaurant.
11	"Run Coop Run"	Jocelan Thiessen	May 8, 2010
Coop and Dennis are trying to get rid of an explosive soccer ball made by Kat.
12	"Sky High Dive"	Jamie LeClaire	May 8, 2010
Kat squirts rubbery goo on the diving board of Phoebe's pool, and makes Coop go sky high.
13	"Slap Shots"	Dan Hughes	May 8, 2010
Kat is persecuting Coop and tries to destroy him after he plays hockey.

=== Season 2 (2011) ===
The director(s) for the Season 2 shorts (and writer(s) and storyboard artist(s) for "Kat's Dance") is unknown.

No.	Title	Written by	Storyboard by	Original release date
14	"A Squirrel Wind Adventure"	Rob Boutilier	Kevin Schmid	February 15, 2011
When Kat attacks a squirrel, all the squirrels attack Kat with nuts for revenge.
15	"Boy Meats Grill"	Greg Sullivan	Sam To	February 23, 2011
Coop helps Dad barbecue, but Kat starts a fight with the meat.
16	"Boys vs. Bus"	Tony Elliott	Dave Pemberton	February 25, 2011
A wild chase ensues when Lorne and Harley miss the school bus, again.
17	"Catboy"	Josh Mepham	Dave Pemberton	February 26, 2011
Lorne and Harley rock-out in a musical tribute to the fight of Coop vs. Kat.
18	"Come Wail Away"	Greg Sullivan	Kevin Schmid	March 5, 2011
As Kat joins a bunch of wailing cats, Coop mistakes it for a signal of an alien invasion and sets out to wake up the entire town in alarm.
19	"Geriatric Joust"	Greg Sullivan	Dave Pemberton	March 14, 2011
Coop and Kat start a joust at Bootsville's retirement home.
20	"Itty Bitty Kitty Committee"	Rob Boutilier	Kevin Schmid	April 21, 2011
Coop discovers that Kat has shed his skin, leaving alien termites, after being broken by Coop.
21	"Kat's Dance"	Unknown	Unknown	April 25, 2011
When Kat is not trying to destroy Coop or build some new-fangled device, he's working on his new dance, the Frisky Kitty.
22	"Katnapped!"	Greg Sullivan	Evil Tim	April 28, 2011
Coop goes into Kat's brain to mess with Kat's dreams to make them his worst nightmare, but it's a big nightmare for Coop.
23	"Laser Guided Furball"	Kendra Hibbert	Evil Tim	May 11, 2011
Kat distracts Honeyfluff with a laser, and this makes Coop be attacked by Phoebe's cat.
24	"Lions and Tigers and Kat... Oh My!"	Adam Higgs	Evil Tim	May 22, 2011
Kat gets up close and personal with the exhibits on a family trip to the zoo.
25	"Pretty Kitty"	Heather Jackson	Sucy Scott	May 28, 2011
When the Burtonburgers take Kat to the pet groomer, all of them get a makeover.
26	"Whiskering Heights"	Greg Sullivan	Kent Webb	June 5, 2011
When Kat gets stuck in a tree, Old Lady Munson helps Millie by calling the fire department to get Kat to come down.
27	"You and Whose Armour?"	Kendra Hibbert	Kevin Schmid	June 5, 2011
Coop finds an old washing machine, and he decides to use it as a suit of armor and protect himself from Kat or any other harm.
