= Roach =

Roach or The Roach may refer to:

== Animals ==
- Cockroach, various insect species of the order Blattodea
- Common roach (Rutilus rutilus), a fresh and brackish water fish of the family Cyprinidae
  - Rutilus or roaches, a genus of fishes
  - Members of several other leuciscid genera, including:
    - Leucos, from southern Europe
    - Sarmarutilus, from southern Europe
    - Hesperoleucus, from western North America

== Places ==
- Roach, Missouri, an unincorporated community
- Roach, Nevada, a ghost town
- Roach, West Virginia, an unincorporated community
- Roach River (Maine), a river in Piscataquis County
- Roach River (Virginia), a tributary of the North Fork Rivanna River
- River Roach, Essex, England
- Roach, former name of the Rural Municipality of Leroy No. 339, Saskatchewan, Canada

== People ==
- Roach (surname), a list of people who bear the last name Roach
- Roach (rapper) (born 1988), American rapper and hip-hop artist
- Roach, fictional character in the animated series Supernoobs
- Gary "Roach" Sanderson, a playable character in Call of Duty: Modern Warfare 2
- Roach Stewart (1881–1948), college football player and attorney
- Roach, a fictional character from the 1991 crime-action film, Point Break
- Law Roach

== Other ==
- A Zerg unit in StarCraft 2
- Roach (headdress), traditional Native American headdress usually of porcupine hair
- Roach (sail), an arc of extra material on the leech of a sail
- Roach (smoking), the butt of a marijuana cigarette
- Roaching, a way of styling the mane of a horse
- Roach back, a type of conformation of the back of a horse
- Roach Stone, a type of Portland stone with many shell fragments within the stone
- Roach v Electoral Commissioner, a landmark 2007 High Court of Australia case
- "The Roach (The Chronic Outro)", track on Dr Dre's 1992 album The Chronic
- "The Roach" or "The Giant Cockroach", 1923 Russian children's poem by Korney Chukovsky
- Papa Roach, American rock band

== See also ==
- Roaches (disambiguation)
- Roache, the surname of several actors
- Dace, several species of small fish
- Shiner (fish), several species of small fish
