= Studio B Productions =

Defunct Canadian animation studio

Studio B Productions, Inc.
- Studio B Productions logo
- Type: In-name-only unit of WildBrain
- Industry: Animation
- Founded: 1988; 38 years ago
- Founders: Blair Peters; Chris Bartleman
- Defunct: 2016; 10 years ago
- Fate: Merged with Nerd Corps Entertainment to form DHX Studios
- Successor: DHX Studios
- Headquarters: Vancouver, British Columbia, Canada
- Parent: DHX Media (2007–2016)
- Website: studiobproductions.com at the Wayback Machine (archived September 27, 2003)

Studio B Productions, Inc. (sometimes known as just Studio B and later known as DHX Media Vancouver) was a Canadian animation studio and production company founded by Blair Peters and Chris Bartleman in Vancouver, British Columbia in 1988. The studio was acquired by DHX Media (now WildBrain) on December 4, 2007, and became a subsidiary there since then.

The Studio B brand was discontinued in 2011, while the studio itself merged with fellow DHX subsidiary Nerd Corps Entertainment to form DHX Studios (now WildBrain Studios) in 2016. All Studio B series were branded under the DHX Media name until 2019, when the latter rebranded as WildBrain.

== History ==
The company was founded in 1988 by Blair Peters and Chris Bartleman. On December 4, 2007, DHX Media acquired Studio B. On September 8, 2010, the renaming of the studio after its parent company, along with DHX Media's other subsidiaries, was announced: officially, on December 22, 2010, Studio B Productions Inc. and Studio B (Animation Service) Productions Inc. were renamed DHX Media (Vancouver) Ltd. and DHX Media Studio (Vancouver) Ltd., respectively, and on January 11, 2011, Studio B Holdings Inc. was renamed DHX Media (Vancouver Prod) Ltd. Peters left Studio B in 2011, while Bartleman left the company two years later.

In 2016, the former Studio B team was relocated to a new facility in Vancouver. The new building also houses the former Nerd Corps Entertainment, an animation studio which DHX Media acquired in 2014.

== Filmography ==
=== Television series ===
Co-productions and original series

Show	Creator(s)	Year(s)	Co-production(s)	Notes
The Savage Dragon	Erik Larsen; Dean Stefan; Bob Forward	1996	P3 Entertainment; Universal Cartoon Studios; USA Studios	Season 2 only Currently distributed by NBCUniversal Television Distribution
Ned's Newt	Andy Knight; Mike Burgess	1998–1999	TMO-Loonland; Nelvana	Season 2 only
Yvon of the Yukon	Ian James Corlett; Terry Klassen	2000–2004	Alliance Atlantis Communications (seasons 1–2); Corus Entertainment; YTV	
What About Mimi?	Chris Bartleman; Blair Peters	2000–2002	Decode Entertainment; Junior-EM.TV; Teletoon	
D'Myna Leagues	Chris Bartleman; Blair Peters	2000–2004	Aston Entertainment; CTV	
Yakkity Yak	Mark Gravas	2002–2003	Kapow Pictures; MTV Networks International; Nickelodeon Australia; Teletoon	
Something Else	Kathryn Cave	2002	TV-Loonland AG	
Edgar & Ellen	Charles Ogden	2005–2007	Star Farm Productions	Shorts only
Being Ian	Ian James Corlett	2005–2008	Nelvana; YTV	Currently distributed by Nelvana
Class of the Titans	Chris Bartleman; Michael Lahay	2005–2008	Nelvana; Teletoon	Currently distributed by Nelvana
The Amazing Adrenalini Brothers	Dan Chambers; Mark Huckerby; Nick Ostler	2006	Pesky; Bejuba! Entertainment; Red and Blue Productions; YTV	Currently distributed by Bejuba! Entertainment
Pucca	Boo Kyoung Kim; Calvin Kim	2006–2008	VOOZ Character System; Jetix Europe	Currently distributed by VOOZ Character System
B-Hive.tv Shorts	Studio B Productions	2006		
George of the Jungle	Jay Ward	2007–2008	Classic Media; Bullwinkle Studios; Cartoon Network; Teletoon	Currently distributed by NBCUniversal Television Distribution
Ricky Sprocket: Showbiz Boy	David Fine; Alison Snowden	2007–2009	Bejuba! Entertainment; SnowdenFine Animation; Nicktoons Network; Teletoon	Currently distributed by Bejuba! Entertainment
Martha Speaks	Susan Meddaugh	2008–2014	Oasis Animation (seasons 5–6); WGBH	
Kid vs. Kat	Rob Boutilier	2008–2011	Jetix Europe (season 1); Disney XD (season 2); YTV	
My Little Pony: Friendship Is Magic	Lauren Faust	2010–2019	Hasbro Studios; Top Draw Animation	First 28 episodes delivered as Studio B Productions
Pound Puppies	David Sacks	2010–2013	Paul & Joe Productions (episodes 1–39); 9 Story Entertainment (episodes 1–7); Hasbro Studios	
Littlest Pet Shop	Julie McNally Cahill; Timothy Cahill	2012–2016	Hasbro Studios	
Packages from Planet X	Jeff Harter	2013–2014	American Greetings; Disney XD; Teletoon	
Transformers: Rescue Bots	Nicole Dubuc; Brian Hohlfeld; Jeff Kline	2014–2016	Hasbro Studios	Seasons 3–4 only

Production services

Show	Year(s)	Co-production(s)	Notes
Beetlejuice	1989–1991	Tim Burton Inc. Nelvana; The Geffen Film Company; Warner Bros. Television	Layouts and posing; 18 episodes
Sesame Street	1991	Children's Television Workshop	"Flossee and Splatt" short only
Eek! the Cat	1992–1997	Savage Studios; Nelvana; Fox Children's Productions	Layouts, design and posing; 10 episodes
Super Dave: Daredevil for Hire	1992–1993	Blye-Einstein Productions; Reteitalia, S.p.A. DIC Entertainment	Pre-production design and art direction
Stunt Dawgs	1992–1993	Rainforest Entertainment; Franklin/Waterman; Claster Television	Full pre-production packages; 26 episodes
The Terrible Thunderlizards	1993–1997	Savage Studios; Nelvana; Fox Children's Productions	Pre-production, design, layout and posing; 17 episodes
Adventures of Sonic the Hedgehog	1993–1996	Sega of America; Reteitalia, S.p.A. Bohbot Entertainment; DIC Entertainment	Full pre-production packages, design, layout and posing; pilot and 31 episodes
Sonic the Hedgehog	1993–1994	Sega of America; Reteitalia, S.p.A. Telecinco; DIC Entertainment	Pre-production, season 1 only
Tales from the Cryptkeeper	1993–1999	Fantome Animation (season 3); CBS Productions (season 3); Nelvana	Storyboards
Where on Earth Is Carmen Sandiego?	1994–1999	DIC Entertainment	Layouts and posing
The Brothers Grunt	1994–1995	a.k.a. Cartoon; MTV Networks	Pre-production design, layout and posing
ReBoot	1994–2001	BLT Productions; Shaw Communications (season 3); Mainframe Entertainment; Alliance Atlantis; Claster Television; YTV	Stock pack, pre-production design, storyboards and timing; 4 episodes
Street Sharks	1994–1997	Bohbot Entertainment; DIC Entertainment	Full pre-production package; 3 episodes
The Mask: Animated Series	1995–1997	Dark Horse Entertainment; Film Roman; Sunbow Entertainment; New Line Television	Pre-production; 12 episodes Currently distributed by Warner Bros. Domestic Television Distribution
Timon and Pumbaa	1995–1999	Walt Disney Television Animation	Pre-production; season 3 only
Princess Gwenevere and the Jewel Riders	1995–1996	New Frontier Entertainment; Enchanted Camelot Productions; Bohbot Entertainment	Season 1 only
The Twisted Tales of Felix the Cat	1995–1997	Felix the Cat Productions; Film Roman	7 episodes plus CBS bumpers Currently distributed by NBCUniversal Television Distribution
Action Man	1995–1996	Bohbot Entertainment; DIC Entertainment	
Ace Ventura: Pet Detective	1995–1997	Nelvana; Morgan Creek Productions	Pre-production; 4 episodes
Mighty Ducks: The Animated Series	1996–1997	Walt Disney Television Animation	Pre-production; 8 episodes
Road Rovers	1996–1997	Warner Bros. Television Animation	Pre-production; 2 episodes
Jungle Cubs	1996–1998	Walt Disney Television Animation	Pre-production; 8 episodes
The Angry Beavers	1997–2001	Gunther-Wahl Productions; Nickelodeon Animation Studio	Pre-production; 15 episodes
The Wacky World of Tex Avery	1997	Les Studios Tex; Telcima S.A. M6; DIC Entertainment	Pre-production; 7 episodes
The Legend of Calamity Jane	1997	Gangster Production; Contre Allée; Warner Bros. International Television Production	Pre-production; 6 episodes
CatDog	1998–2005	Peter Hannan Productions; Nickelodeon Animation Studio	Pre-production; 7 episodes
Invasion America	1998	DreamWorks Television Animation	Storyboards
Bob and Margaret	1998–2001	SnowdenFine Animation; National Film Board of Canada; Philippine Animation Studio Inc. (season 3–4); Channel 4 (season 1); Comedy Central (seasons 1–2); Nelvana	Design; 7 episodes
Cyberchase	1999	WNET New York; Curious Pictures	Pilot episode only
A Little Curious	1999–2000	Curious Pictures; HBO	"A Ring Is Not a Ring" short from "Open, Close, Ring" only
George and Martha	1999–2000	Wild Things Productions; Nelvana	
Blaster's Universe	1999–2000	Knowledge Adventure; CBS Productions; Hong Guang Animation; Nelvana	
Mission Hill	1999–2002	Castle Rock Entertainment; Film Roman; Bill Oakley/Josh Weinstein Productions; Warner Bros. Television	Layouts
George Shrinks	2000–2003	Jade Animation; Nelvana	Design; 3 episodes
Corduroy	2000–2001	Sichuan Top Animation; Nelvana	Pre-production; 13 episodes
Braceface	2001–2004	Jade Animation; Nelvana	Design; 11 episodes
The New Woody Woodpecker Show	2002	Universal Cartoon Studios	Pre-production; season 3 only
Stroker & Hoop	2004–2005	Turner Studios; Williams Street	
Krypto the Superdog	2005	Warner Bros. Family Entertainment; Warner Bros. Animation	Animation services; season 1 only
Coconut Fred's Fruit Salad Island!	2005–2006	Warner Bros. Family Entertainment; Warner Bros. Animation	Animation services
Peanuts Motion Comics	2008	Warner Premiere	
Roy	2009–2015	Jam Media; CBBC	Animation services
Take Two with Phineas and Ferb	2010–2011	Hieroglyphic Productions; Disney Television Animation	
The Mr. Peabody & Sherman Show	2015–2017	Jay Ward Productions; DreamWorks Animation Television	

=== Films and specials ===
Title	Year	Co-production(s)	Notes
Who Framed Roger Rabbit	1988	Buena Vista Pictures Distribution; Touchstone Pictures; Amblin Entertainment; Silver Screen Partners III	
Sonic Christmas Blast	1996	DIC Entertainment	Pre-production
Snowden: Raggedy Ann & Andy's Adventure	1998	Dayton-Hudson Corporation; 20th Century Fox Home Entertainment	
Little Witch	1999	Sony Wonder	
Santa Mouse and the Rat Deer	2000	Fox Family; Sony Wonder	
Reader Rabbit: The Great Alphabet Race	2004	The Learning Company	
Reader Rabbit: Wordville Soup	2004	The Learning Company	
The Legend of Frosty the Snowman	2005	Classic Media	Pre-production
My Little Pony: Equestria Girls	2013	Hasbro Studios	
My Little Pony: Equestria Girls – Rainbow Rocks	2014	Hasbro Studios	
My Little Pony: Equestria Girls – Friendship Games	2015	Hasbro Studios	
My Little Pony: Equestria Girls – Legend of Everfree	2016	Hasbro Studios	
My Little Pony: The Movie	2017	Allspark Pictures; Lionsgate	
My Little Pony: Best Gift Ever	2018	Allspark Animation	
