= Roaches =

Roaches may refer to:

- Carl Roaches (born 1953), American former football player
- Roaches, Illinois, United States, an unincorporated community
- The Roaches, a gritstone escarpment in Staffordshire, England

== See also ==
- Roach (disambiguation)
- Roache, a surname
- The Roches, a female vocal group
