= John Roach =

John Roach may refer to any of the following:

- John Roach (shipbuilder) (1816–1887), United States shipbuilder
- John Roach (bishop) (1921–2003), bishop of the Catholic Church
- John Roach (baseball) (1867–1934), former Major League Baseball pitcher
- John Roach (footballer, born 1862), Welsh international footballer
- John Roach (American football) (1933–2021), football player
- John Roach (English footballer), English footballer played for Manchester United, FC Sète, and Accrington Stanley
- John C. Roach, justice on the Kentucky Supreme Court
- John Ross Roach (1900–1973), Canadian ice hockey player
- John Vinson Roach II (1938–2022) pioneer of the personal computer

== See also ==
- John Roche (disambiguation)
- Roach (surname)
