= John Roche =

John Roche may refer to:

- John A. Roche (1844–1904), Chicago politician
- John Roche (politician) (1848–1914), Irish politician
- John Roche (detective) (1905–1940), Garda Síochána detective
- John Roche (actor) (1893–1952), American actor
- John Roche (basketball) (born 1949), retired American professional basketball player
- John Roche (martyr) (died 1588), Irishman, one of the English Martyrs executed in 1588, beatified in 1992
- Johnny Roche (1932–1988), English footballer
- Jack Roche (born 1953), Australian convicted on a charge of conspiring to destroy the Israeli Embassy in Canberra, Australia
- Jack Roche (baseball) (1890–1983), Major League Baseball catcher
- John Roche (bishop) (1584–1636), Irish Roman Catholic bishop
- John Francis Roche, American serial killer, burglar, and rapist
- John Roche (Canadian politician) (1834–1893), member of the Legislative Council of Quebec
- John Roche (scientist), appointed in 2025 as the Prime Minister's Chief Science Advisor

== See also ==
- John Roach (disambiguation)
