= Kid vs. Kat =

Canadian animated television series

- Genre: Science fiction; Science fantasy; Slapstick comedy; Surreal comedy
- Created by: Rob Boutilier
- Directed by: Rob Boutilier; Josh Mepham; Greg Sullivan (S1); Blair Peters (S1)
- Voices of: Erin Mathews; Kathleen Barr; Trevor Devall; Cathy Weseluck; Linda Sorenson; Chiara Zanni
- Composer: Hal Beckett
- Country of origin: Canada
- Original language: English
- No. of seasons: 2
- No. of episodes: 52 (101 segments) (list of episodes)

Production
- Executive producers: Blair Peters; Chris Bartleman
- Producers: Jamie Turner (S1); Chantal Hennessey (S2)
- Running time: 22 minutes (11 minutes per segment)
- Production company: Studio B Productions (Note: As Studio B (Kid I) Productions Inc. for season 1 and Studio B (Kid II) Productions Inc. for season 2.)

Original release
- Network: YTV (Canada); Disney XD (U.S.)
- Release: October 25, 2008 (Note: In the United States, its sneak peek arrived on February 13, 2009, but officially premiered on February 21, 2009.) – June 4, 2011 (Note: In the United States, it ended on July 20, 2011.)

Kid vs. Kat (stylized KiD vs KaT) is a Canadian animated television series that originally aired on YTV in Canada from October 25, 2008, until June 4, 2011 and Disney XD in the United States from February 13, 2009 to July 20, 2011. The series was created and co-directed by Rob Boutilier, and developed and produced at Studio B Productions (a subsidiary of DHX Media, now WildBrain), in association with YTV and Jetix Europe (later rebranded as Disney XD for its second season). Two seasons of 52 episodes total were produced.

== Premise ==
When 10-year-old Coop Burtonburger's spoiled 8-year-old sister Millie brings home a strange 7-year-old stray cat named Mr. Kat, his idyllic life shatters as he discovers that the cat is actually an alien mastermind called a Katnipian, also known as a Kat Nebulan, a species of aliens resembling Sphynx cats from the planet Kat Nebula with an assumingly sinister goal. The two battle daily as Coop tries to warn others of Mr. Kat's evil, only to find his evidence destroyed by him and deemed a fool. The only one who believes Coop is his best friend Dennis, who often aids him in fighting Kat; they are later joined by Fiona, Coop's love interest, in the second season. The series is set in the fictional town of Bootsville, Vancouver, British Columbia.

== Episodes ==
Season	Segments	Episodes	Originally released	
Season	Segments	Episodes	First released	Last released
1	51	26	October 25, 2008	November 30, 2009
Shorts	N/A	27	November 4, 2008	June 5, 2011
2	50	26	September 11, 2010	June 4, 2011

== Voice cast ==
- Erin Mathews as Coop Burtonburger
- Kathleen Barr as Kat (Mr. Kat), Millie Burtonburger, Tutankitty
- Trevor Devall as Burt Burtonburger
- Cathy Weseluck as Dennis Lawrence Chan
- Linda Sorenson as Old Lady Munson
- Vincent Tong as Henry Chan
- Tabitha St. Germain as Phoebe, Mrs. Brannigan
- Chiara Zanni as Fiona Munson
- Rebecca Shoichet as Lorne, Dr. K
- Brian Drummond as Harley, Buck Diamond, Senior Officer, Principal Dilegard, Pet Doctor, Mayor
- Christopher Gaze as Mr. Cheeks, Lloyd
- Terry Klassen as Rookie
- Katie Crown as Estelle
- Michael Daingerfield as Mr. Gerber

== Production ==
=== Development ===
The series' pilot was first shown off at MIPCOM Jr. in 2006, and the series was officially revealed under the title Look What My Sister Dragged In in February 2007, where Studio B signed a development deal with YTV for the series. The series' production was started in January 2008, and it was animated in Flash. Animation services were taken place at Feitong Cartoon Graphics Services, while layout and background services were taken place at Top Draw Animation.

On February 12, 2008, after purchasing Studio B Productions, their new owner DHX Media announced they had licensed out the TV, home video, and consumer product rights for the series to Jetix Europe in areas where the company operated Jetix channels, while Disney-ABC International Television would handle TV distribution in these territories. DHX's then-TV distributor Decode Enterprises would handle television, home entertainment, and merchandising and licensing rights for the rest of the world.

On April 15, 2008, the series was pre-sold by Decode to air on Toon Disney's Jetix block in the United States.

On October 19, 2009, DHX announced that the series had been renewed for a second season. By then, the series had been airing on over 10 Disney XD channels around the world. It was also announced that the series had been pre-sold to additional broadcasters, including Vrak in Canada, ABC in Australia, Disney XD Latin America, Disney XD India, Disney XD Japan, Cartoon Network South Korea and Nickelodeon Asia. On August 10, 2010, DHX announced that TV Azteca in Mexico and ECTV in Ecuador had pre-sold the series for free TV in Latin America. The series would later move to other channels, including Disney Channel Asia, Disney XD Asia, Disney Channel Japan, and Disney Channel India.

=== Cancellation ===
On August 19, 2011, Rob Boutilier announced via Facebook that the series wasn't renewed for a third season, as he lacked the rights to make further episodes. In 2017, he revealed on Twitter that Coop and Kat became friends after the events of the series.

== Reception ==
Emily Ashby of Common Sense Media gave the series a 3 out of 5, stating: "Feline's evil schemes are outrageous - but fun for kids".
