= Packages from Planet X =

- Genre: Action-adventure; Science fantasy Science fiction
- Created by: Jeff Harter
- Directed by: Rob Boutilier; Josh Mepham; James Wootton
- Voices of: Vincent Tong; Britt Irvin; Ty Olsson; Brian Drummond; César Monroy; Kyle Rideout
- Composer: William Kevin Anderson
- Countries of origin: Canada; United States
- Original language: English
- No. of seasons: 1
- No. of episodes: 26 (52 segments)

Production
- Executive producers: Chris Bartleman; Steven DeNure; Kirsten Newlands; Jeffrey Conrad; Sean Gorman; Ryan Wiesbrock
- Producer: Lori Lozinski
- Running time: 22 minutes (11 minutes per short)
- Production companies: American Greetings; American Greetings Properties; DHX Media

Original release
- Network: Teletoon (Canada); Disney XD (United States)
- Release: July 13, 2013 – February 24, 2014

Related
- Boy Girl Dog Cat Mouse Cheese

Packages from Planet X is an animated science fantasy television series created by Jeff Harter. The series was produced by the Vancouver studio DHX Media and American Greetings Properties. The series premiered on Disney XD on July 13, 2013, and later on Teletoon and Télétoon on January 16, 2014, as part of their "Can't Miss Thursday" lineup. The show ended on February 24, 2014. 26 episodes were produced.

== Characters ==
=== Main ===
- Dan Zembrosky (voiced by Vincent Tong) is the 16-year-old main protagonist who typically hangs out with his best friends Amanda and Troll. Since he started receiving packages, Dan has taken on a slight hero role. There have been multiple occasions where he uses them to his advantage in the group's everyday lives, but he still always comes through.
- Amanda Highborn (voiced by Britt Irvin) is the genius of the group due to her uncle Rory leaving her a journal telling her about the packages and what do they do. Her uncle's disappearance has made Amanda suspicious about everyone in Iron Bay being aliens and made her determined to find Rory. It was revealed in "A Night at West Iron High" that Amanda was afraid of dolls. It's well known that her mother is obsessed with shoes and tries to make her a pageant girl. She was responsible for CuRT being damaged and feels guilty for whenever she makes a mistake.
- Troll Moko (voiced by Ty Olsson) is Dan's best friend and his right-hand man. Like Dan, Troll usually acts first and asks questions later when it comes to packages. He respects all nature and animals, except racoons (due to one of his ancestors being a raccoon hunter). Despite Troll's obese weight and big appetite, it's been shown on rare occasions that he is a great cook and that he's freakishly strong and athletic.
- Corvis Copernicus/Leepthor (voiced by Brian Drummond) is the series' main antagonist who constantly tries to take the packages back from Dan, cocoon everyone in Iron Bay and take over Earth in the name of Planet X. When he first came to the planet, Leepthor took over Copernicus' body and used him as a cover so he won't be exposed. It was once hinted that Leepthor was Rory's rival. He was temporarily sent back to Planet X in the series finale, but was placed back on the Earth mission.
- Calimary (voiced by Tabitha St. Germain) is a mutated squibbon (a monkey with giant squid arms attached to her back) who is Copernicus' sidekick and his first mutant creation. Despite her cravings for banana fish and her slight stupidity, Copernicus considers her his closest friend. Calimary temporarily teamed up with Troll in "Mission to Planet X" and considered joining Dan's group, but Troll, seeing Copernicus needed her more than them, let Calimary return to serving her master.

=== Recurring ===
- CuRT is a robot assistant, the keeper of the group's packages at the abandoned observatory and the first package Dan ever received. He has a huge dent on his head, which results in him speaking in riddles. In "CuRT meets BuRT", it's revealed that Amanda was responsible for CuRT's damage as she kicked him in the head.
- Duane Zembrovsky (voiced by Colin Murdock) is Dan's father and the owner of the family's bait shop in the docks. He knows his son would rather hang out with his friends than work in the shop or do something Dan knows is humiliating, and as a result constantly guilt trips him. In "Mission to Planet X", Duane was taken over by an alien stronger than Copernicus and nearly cocooned the whole town but was stopped by Troll, CuRT and Calimary.
- Mrs. Zembrovsky (voiced by Nicole Oliver) is Dan's mother. She runs a daycare class at her house.
- Terrance Buckshot (voiced by Kyle Rideout) is West Iron High's bully who tends to mess with Dan. This usually results in Dan using the package he recently received to one up him. Although Terrance usually comes out on top, he always gets his comeuppance.
- Mr. Dooley (voiced by Michael Daingerfield) is the science teacher to West Iron High who resembles the typical strict teacher. He tends to fail Dan either because he goofs off or just for the fun of it. Mr. Dooley does tend to be harsh with both Amanda and Troll as well, though he does sometimes have a soft side for those two (especially for Amanda, who is a straight-A student in his class). The trio once suspected him of working with Copernicus, but was later revealed to be hiring him as the new janitor.
- Overlord is the main official of Planet X's leaders and one of three aliens who constantly check on Copernicus's progress. He finds him incompetent but is continuously fooled by Dan into thinking Copernicus has taken over earth.
- Rory is Amanda's uncle who disappeared leaving his journal behind for his niece to find but in reality, he was taken prisoner on Planet X and escaped Overlord's prison. He was constantly mentioned by Amanda throughout the first season until he appeared in "Mission to Planet X: Part 1" wearing glasses and a cloak. In Part 2, he bumped into Amanda and disappeared. It was later revealed that he slipped a note in his journal telling his niece he was alive and collecting intel on Planet X. He also gave her plans for a new interceptor so Dan could start receiving packages again.
- Mrs. Highborn is Amanda's mother. She's been trying to get Amanda to do girly things like wanting her to dress all pretty, wants her to hang out with female friends, and giving her dolls to play with that cause Amanda to fear dolls. When Amanda learns there's an alien in the beauty pageant and Amanda needs to get in, she calls her mom and Amanda's mom zips right to her all happy that Amanda is doing some girl activity.
- Mr. and Mrs. Moko are Troll's parents. They run a fishing market and catch fish in the ocean. They appear to be good friends with Dan's father seeing how he runs a bait shop and they come to buy some bait for fishing.

== Episodes ==
No.	Title	Directed by	Written by	Original release date (Teletoon)	U.S. release date	U.S. viewers (millions)
1	"Feast Beast"	Rob Boutilier	Thomas Krajewski	January 14, 2014	July 13, 2013	N/A
Dan's father, Duane, wins the local Harbor Feast every year but when an inventory accident leaves him incapacitated, Dan uses an alien Space Mixer to keep the trophy in the family using Troll's 600-page recipe for Spicy Lava Balls. Dan winds up accidentally creating a giant food monster and it's up to the boys to stop the Feast Beast before it eats everything, and everyone, at the feast. Meanwhile, Amanda baked some fire-burping cookies for the contest in an attempt to expose any aliens. Note: Copernicus and Calimary are absent in this episode.
2	"Brain Briefs"	Josh Mepham; James Wootton	Kevin Campbell	January 21, 2014	July 13, 2013	N/A
In order to get back at Amanda for beating him at blindfold dodgeball, Dan dons a pair of alien underpants that turn him into a genius. When he's awarded Captain of the academic team at the school competition where Amanda suspects aliens are competing, Dan discovers the space-age shorts keep over-heating, and eventually threaten to blow up the entire school. Note: Copernicus and Calimary are absent in this episode.
3	"Monkey Business"	Josh Mepham; James Wootton	Joel Bergen & Alex Muniz	January 28, 2014	July 20, 2013	N/A
When Dan gets an alien helmet package that lets animals talk, he heads to the Wild Animal Park to find the perfect animal actors to help him win a Mammal Mart video contest. But when Dan's stubbornness and ego puts the animals in danger of being turned into hybrid henchmen by Copernicus, he must give up his directing gig and save the innocent creatures.
4	"Astro-Blasters"	Rob Boutilier	Kim Duran	February 4, 2014	July 20, 2013	N/A
When Dan uses an alien telescope to move around the planets and correct his failed astronomy test, he soon discovers he's left a comet hurtling towards Earth. But when Copernicus steals the package for his own evil purposes, it's up to our trio to get it back and save the town from being crushed.
5	"Sticker Shock"	Rob Boutilier	David Ihlenfeld	February 11, 2014	July 22, 2013	0.33
Dan is jealous of all the perks the soccer team gets, so he uses an alien sticker package to swap Terrance's legs for his own in an attempt to make the school soccer team. Wanting to teach Dan a lesson about cheating, Amanda begins swapping stickers to mess with Dan's limbs so they constantly change and blow his chance of making the soccer team. Meanwhile, Troll's animal walking business gets out of control when the stickers swap the animal's body parts. Note: Copernicus and Calimary are absent in this episode.
6	"Somewhere-Elser"	Josh Mepham; James Wootton	Jason Jordan	February 18, 2014	July 27, 2013	N/A
Dan, Troll and Amanda are enjoying the annual Pigeon Days Carnival, but are quickly reminded about the downside when a huge flock of pigeons fly overhead leaving their droppings all over town. In order to speed up their mandatory community service hours, Dan begins zapping away all the pigeon droppings using an alien pen package. But then, Dan accidentally zaps away Troll in an ensuing struggle with him over the device. And when Calimary steals the device and gives it to Copernicus, Dan and Amanda are forced to fight back in order to retire the device and save Troll.
7	"Squid Pro Quo"	Josh Mepham; James Wootton	Kim Duran	February 25, 2014	July 27, 2013	N/A
As the clock ticks down on a mysterious alien package, Dan and Troll are about to get shared credit for catching “Big Gus”, the legendary Lake Squid. However, Troll becomes very angry with Dan after he accidentally takes all the credit, severely threatening the boys' friendship. Though the fame ends up going to his head, Dan still tries to act normal and win Troll's friendship back, but to no avail. It's not until the guys get into a harsh fight after Troll snuck over to Dan's house and kidnapped the squid in revenge for what Dan had done, eventually leading to the package going off and shrinking the prized squid to the size of a guppy. After Dan apologizes to Troll for taking all the credit and acting like a jerk, the two mend their friendship and work together to fool the magazine photographer, before releasing the squid back to the wild. Meanwhile, Calimary develops a crush on the squid. Note: Copernicus only makes a cameo in this episode.
8	"One for the Ages"	Rob Boutilier	Michael Rubiner & Bob Mittenthal	March 4, 2014	August 3, 2013	N/A
Dan and Troll are tired of playing G-rated video games, while Amanda wants to improve her marks from Ms. Baldinger's 1st grade class. So Dan and Troll use an alien age-adjusting egg timer package to reap the benefits of being older, first transforming themselves into adults to access higher-rated video games, then later transforming into octogenarians to eat for free at a buffet. Meanwhile, Amanda uses the package to turn herself into a 6-year-old and reap the benefits of being younger. Soon however, an elderly Dan and Troll see the consequences of aging themselves too much and realize how they're not quite ready for adulthood, while a 6-year-old Amanda realizes that she's been wasting her time upon learning that Ms. Baldinger's 1st grade class no longer gives out letter grades. Things become even more complicated when Copernicus ends up getting his alien hands on the package, and the trio learns that the package's effects become permanent after 8 hours. Now, the young Amanda and elderly Dan and Troll must all use their wits and chase him down in a hilarious age-defying pursuit before they're stuck at whatever age they've become up to that point forever.
9	"Copy Cat"	Josh Mepham; James Wootton	Eric Trueheart	March 11, 2014	August 3, 2013	N/A
Dan duplicates himself using an alien cloning package to get out of a job at his Dad's bait shop so he can go to a concert with Amanda and Troll. His clones, who get progressively dumber with every wave of the wand, also duplicate themselves and Dan is soon stuck wrangling a mob of simple-minded Dans that he must use to stop Copernicus, who has stolen the device and created an evil army of simple-minded Calimarys.
10	"Mask and Ye Shall Receive"	Josh Mepham; James Wootton	Thomas Krajewski	March 18, 2014	August 5, 2013	0.56
In order to figure out the power behind his newest package, an alien hockey mask, Dan and Troll borrow Uncle Rory's journal without Amanda's permission, but they soon become careless with it. This gives Calimary the chance to snatch the valuable book for Copernicus, which she succeeds. Dan tries the face-replicating mask to sneak into Copernicus' lair, but he ends up captured alongside Amanda (who, in a fit of rage following both Dan and Troll's carelessness, came over the lair and demanded Copernicus to return the journal). Knowing his friends need help, it's up to Troll to successfully sneak in to foil Copernicus's evil plans and recover Amanda's most prized possession.
11	"Crash Course"	Rob Boutilier	Story by : Evan Gore & Heather Lombard; Teleplay by : Devin Bunje & Nick Stanton	March 25, 2014	August 10, 2013	N/A
When Dan, Amanda and Troll discover Copernicus has re-routed an incoming package using a gigantic roof laser, the trio can't stop arguing about where it landed and what would be the quickest way to recover it. Amanda wants to use science, Troll relies on nature, and Dan uses a shortcut through a mineshaft. Privately, Troll is also worried that this whole feud between himself and his friends could jeopardize their friendship, and he just wants the dispute to end. Copernicus eventually beats them to the package and dons a huge pair of mechanical fists, so our trio must put aside their differences and work together using their wits to save the day.
12	"A Night at West Iron High"	Rob Boutilier	Jonathan Howard	April 9, 2014	August 10, 2013	N/A
When Dan's skateboard gets smashed by his Mom's daycare brats, he uses an alien camera package to create miniature action figures of himself, his friends, and all his classmates to make money for a new skateboard. The tiny action figures come alive at night and try to take over the high school, forcing our trio to spend the night at school, saving the day. Note: Copernicus and Calimary are absent in this episode.
13	"CuRT Meets BuRT"	Josh Mepham, James Wootton	Vito Viscomi	April 16, 2014	August 12, 2013	N/A
When a new and improved robot assistant named BuRT arrives, Dan turns his back on his glitchy old pal CuRT. But when Copernicus recruits BuRT to the dark side, he tricks our heroes by trapping them in a collapsed mineshaft so that Copernicus can cocoon them. Will the loyal CuRT come through to save the day?
14	"Mind Licorice"	Rob Boutilier	Devin Bunje & Nick Stanton	April 23, 2014	August 17, 2013	N/A
In order to pass an important test and not be sent to summer school, Dan tries switching brains with Amanda using some alien licorice. However, he ends up switching with the dirty raccoon that was distracting him from studying instead. While Amanda tries her best to recover his rodent-minded body, Racoon-Dan must escape the ultimate raccoon hunter… Troll, and still pass his test! Note: Copernicus and Calimary are absent in this episode.
15	"The Iron Crown Affair"	Josh Mepham; James Wootton	Devin Bunje & Nick Stanton	April 30, 2014	August 17, 2013	N/A
When Dan receives a pair of alien exposing sunglasses, Amanda begrudgingly enters the Miss Teen Iron Bay beauty pageant, where they suspect another contestant is an alien. Meanwhile, Dan and Troll become part of Amanda's beauty team and take it upon themselves to win the contest at all costs. Note: Copernicus and Calimary are absent in this episode.
16	"Sunset Towers"	Josh Mepham; James Wootton	Story by : Neil Alsip; Teleplay by : Dan Smith	May 7, 2014	August 19, 2013	0.20
Amanda believes an old age home is a hotbed of alien activity, and Dan becomes convinced she's right when his discovers that his senior citizen nemesis, Old Man Graylien, lives there. When the trio investigate, they find Copernicus is dating one of the residents in order to gain access to the roof where he's installed a giant anti-matter cannon. While Troll stalls both Copernicus and the residents, Dan uses an alien rubberizing package to bounce him and Amanda up to the roof to stop Copernicus and exact revenge on Graylien at the same time.
17	"Brain Freeze"	Josh Mepham; James Wootton	John Crane	May 14, 2014	August 24, 2013	N/A
It's an extremely hot day in Iron Bay, and after Dan and Troll fly an alien hovercraft with goo leaking out and make a mess on the beach, the townsfolk is very angry at them for their antics. In order to make things right, Dan uses an alien snow-cone machine to make delicious snow-cones for the townsfolk. However, these snow-cones don't just give people brain freeze – they also freeze your entire body. After Dan and Troll are forced to wear cozy jackets upon freezing themselves, Copernicus gets hold of the snow-cone machine, hurries to the beach, and starts freezing everyone in order to cocoon them. Dan and Troll, joined by Amanda (the only person in town not to have eaten a snow-cone nor become frozen), all try and stop him. However, this only angers the populace further, who are not only still mad at both Dan and Troll for their earlier antics, but also don't want to give up free snow-cones on the hottest day of the year. Can they figure out another solution before the whole town is turned into cocooned frozen treats?
18	"Party Out of Bounds"	Rob Boutilier	Michael Rubiner & Bob Mittenthal	June 9, 2014	August 24, 2013	N/A
When Dan receives a giant alien speaker, he and Troll decide to throw an outdoor party called "48 Hours of Dan and Troll", hoping to outdo the legendary “24 Hours of Terrance” bash that school bully Terrance is throwing the same day. But then, the alien speaker sends out alien sound wave signals to all the other speakers in town instructing them to come to life and go on a cocooning spree. Even Amanda ends up cocooned. The fun is over for everyone and only Troll's embarrassing Bagbone instrument can save the town.
19	"Spring Loaded"	Josh Mepham; James Wootton	Dale Schott	July 7, 2014	September 14, 2013	0.30
Dan is jealous when Troll gets a Citizen of Steel wristband from Officer Tate and all he gets is an order to pick up trash. When Dan discovers his new high-bouncing alien pogo stick is actually an alien seed planter that grows beautiful trees, he figures he'll get his due recognition and more wristbands than Troll…until the large plants start body-snatching Iron Bay citizens. Luckily, the trio soon discover they can kill the plants with the help of Troll's dog walking service, but only when the dogs relieve themselves.
20	"Bad Hair Day"	Rob Boutilier	Dale Schott	July 8, 2014	September 21, 2013	0.34
Dan and Troll compete to blow the biggest gum bubble in order to boost their popularity at school and get their own pages in the yearbook. Dan goes too far with his bubble blowing, and when his gum bubble fills the school and explodes, gum is stuck in everyone's hair (with Dan, Amanda and Troll being stuck to each other), and every student is angry at Dan for this dilemma. In order to get his reputation back, Dan uses a pair of hair cutting alien scissors to dish out amazingly stylish haircuts to his classmates (while also getting himself unstuck from both Amanda and Troll), only to find out that all the hair trimmings have rolled off into the sewers and formed into a giant alien Hairzilla! Now it's up to the trio to defeat the hairball by using hair's one weakness… bubblegum. Note: Copernicus and Calimary are absent in this episode.
21	"Tummy Trouble"	Rob Boutilier	Michael Rubiner & Bob Mittenthal	July 9, 2014	September 28, 2013	0.38
Dan desperately wants to go to the victory rally for his favorite full contact horseshoes team, the Iron Bay Rustbuckets, but his parents won't let him miss school. In order to get out of school and go to the rally, Dan swallows an alien breath mint package to give himself a stomach ache. Dan soon regrets eating the breath mints when his stomach begins to grow and later learns that school was cancelled in response to the rally. And when he gives birth to 8 alien babies with a taste for metal, his plans quickly change to saving the huge Iron Bay Bridge where the rally is being held. Note: Copernicus and Calimary are absent in this episode.
22	"Troll's BFF"	Rob Boutilier	Story by : Jonathan Howard; Teleplay by : Devin Bunje & Nick Stanton	July 10, 2014	October 5, 2013	0.34
After destroying a package that Troll really wanted to use, Dan makes it up to him by giving him what he thinks is a useless stuffed panda. Once the panda comes to life and becomes Troll's new BFF, however, Dan turns into a jealous mess, at least until he discovers that the panda also doubles as a hypnotising evil assassin for Copernicus.
23	"Truth or Scare"	Rob Boutilier	Story by : J.D. Smith; Teleplay by : Rick Williams & Jenna McGrath	July 11, 2014	October 12, 2013	0.34
Dan challenges Troll and Amanda to the ultimate Halloween truth or dare (which is to be done without using any packages), where the three friends find themselves sneaking into Copernicus' lair on a dare to take a photo of the alien asleep. However, they soon wish they hadn't followed through with the dare after Troll gets captured and turned into an alien by Calimary, and both Dan and Amanda are threatened by Copernicus to be held as hostages so that he can receive and open the packages.
24	"Working For Peanuts"	James Wootton	Michael Rubiner & Bob Mittenthal	July 14, 2014	October 12, 2013	0.34
Dan gets a mysterious alien figurine wrapped in packing peanuts. With reason to believe it's actually a doomsday device, the gang tries to keep the figurine away from Copernicus. But the peanuts turn out to be an even bigger threat: they reproduce at an alarming rate, then blow around town, wrapping and cocooning citizens. The solution may lie in Duane's new part-time job cleaning out porta-potties, but first Dan has to get over his embarrassment about it.
25	"Birthday Bounty"	Josh Mepham; James Wootton	Ed Valentine	July 15, 2014	October 19, 2013	0.29
When Dan once again forgets to get a gift for Amanda's birthday, he presents her with an alien package that he claims is a dazzling necklace. Amanda loves it, but when Dan and Troll discover the necklace is a homing device for a deadly alien assassin named Roclaw, they must remove the necklace from her, without ruining the fancy birthday ball her mom (who holds a grudge against the boys for their prior history of annoying antics) has organized for her.
26	"Bubble Trouble"	Rob Boutilier	Jason Jordan	July 16, 2014	October 19, 2013	0.29
While stuck babysitting at his Mom's daycare full of screaming toddlers, Dan uses an alien bubble maker to amuse and silence the kids - problem solved! That is, until the kids begin floating away towards an energy cloud Copernicus has created to sap the children's energy and destroy Iron Bay. Now it's up to our trio to save the kids, and the town.
27	"Shadow Boxers"	Rob Boutilier	John Crane	July 17, 2014	October 26, 2013	0.36
Dan receives an alien flashlight package and, instead of safely testing it out, he immediately starts playing flashlight tag with Troll, only for the shadows to come to life and attack them. When Copernicus and Calimary swipe the flashlight, soon the whole town is being attacked by evil shadows. Dan and (to a lesser extent) Troll's impulsive solutions keep making things worse, until they finally stop and think things through.
28	"For Whom the Bell Trolls"	James Wootton	Rick Williams & Jenna McGrath	July 18, 2014	October 26, 2013	0.36
After accidentally trashing a cherished Troll memento, Dan's guilt prompts him to hand over a fresh untested package to his best buddy. He then lives to regret it when the snazzy alien wrist watch gets stuck on Troll, and starts counting down the minutes before transporting Troll back to Planet X with no return trip. The trio tries everything possible to remove the watch, but will they manage it in time? Meanwhile, Copernicus seeks to steal the watch in order to return to Planet X and straighten out the delivery mix-up to receive future packages.
29	"Return to Sender"	Rob Boutilier	Devin Bunje & Nick Stanton	August 1, 2014	November 2, 2013	0.43
30	"Return to Sender"	Josh Mepham; James Wootton	Devin Bunje & Nick Stanton	August 1, 2014	November 2, 2013	0.43
Part 1: Amanda discovers why Dan has been getting the packages – he accidentally swiped his hand on an “interceptor” device that rerouted them to him. After Dan wreaks havoc with yet another package (an extinguisher that literally extinguishes things), Amanda decides to reprogram the interceptor so the packages will come to her and she can put them away for safe-keeping. Not happy with Amanda's plan, Dan ends up fighting with her for the interceptor. This ensuing struggle causes the interceptor to break, resulting in all the newer packages going to … Copernicus! Part 2: Now that Copernicus is receiving the packages, he's using them to try and locate a buried meteor made up of a dangerous alien substance called Xeronium. Badly outgunned, the trio must rely on their wits – and a newly discovered message from Amanda's Uncle Rory – to try and stop Copernicus from carrying out his evil alien plans and also get some of the Xeronium needed to fix the broken interceptor. And even if they succeed, will they ever receive the packages again?
31	"Dream On"	Rob Boutilier	Dale Schott	August 4, 2014	November 4, 2013	0.33
Dan receives a dreamcatcher-like package that gives him the ability to enter and influence people's dreams. Using this, he turns Amanda into an aggressive video game player, Troll into a ballerina, and Copernicus into a showtune-singing kitty lover. But things go haywire when Dan winds up getting caught in a nightmare of his own design upon Copernicus wanting to be best friends and prevent Dan from leaving the dream world.
32	"Off Road Rage"	James Wootton	Story by : J.D. Smith; Teleplay by : Devin Bunje & Nick Stanton	September 26, 2014	November 9, 2013	0.38
When Dan opens a package that allows him to flash-modify any vehicle he chooses, he wants to use it to help Troll win the Iron Bay Off Road Challenge and finally get Troll's family name on the cup, but Troll wants to win with honour and will have none of it. Only Terrance and his Dad stand in the way, until Copernicus also enters the race, determined to get his hands on the alien device at all costs.
33	"Fitness Crazed"	Rob Boutilier	Story by : Russell Marcus; Teleplay by : John Crane	October 7, 2014	November 9, 2013	0.38
Tired of being weaker, slower and less athletic than Troll, Dan gets his chance at redemption when a weightlifter's belt arrives that instantly pumps him up to Mr. Universe proportions and allows him to do superhuman feats of fitness. When the townsfolk get a look at super-fit Dan, they want in on the action too. Soon the whole town is so buff that even babies are ripping doors off cars. Troll attempts to try on the belt, but the effects of the belt don't work on him due to his sweat. In any case, however, the belt's effects are only temporary, and soon everyone's new bulk settles elsewhere in their bodies. With the populace barely able to move, they're easy pickings for Copernicus and only a little Troll sweat can save the day.
34	"Christmas Evil"	Rob Boutilier	Dale Schott	November 14, 2014	December 4, 2013	0.56
Filled with the spirit of the holidays, and out to be crowned the King of Christmas, Dan uses a package that allows him to move at lightning speed to decorate the town square. When he ends up destroying everything instead, he tries to make it up to all the angry citizens and save his chance at winning the competition by delivering seemingly innocuous alien toys to every house in Iron Bay on Christmas Eve. But the toys are under Copernicus' control and they soon end up hypnotizing everyone, including Amanda and Troll. Dan alone must now use his wits to save his friends, the town, and Christmas.
35	"True North Strong & Freezing"	James Wootton	Vito Viscomi	December 12, 2014	December 4, 2013	0.56
When the trio discover that Copernicus has infected the bay with bacteria, the annual Wahoo Wakeboard contest that Dan has been looking forward to has to be cancelled. Dan attempts to use an alien Fridge Magnet to freeze Copernicus out, but his plan backfires when the magnet not only flash freezes Copernicus's lair as planned, but threatens to turn Iron Bay into the new North Pole.
36	"Big Dan on Campus"	Rob Boutilier	Rick Williams & Jenna McGrath	January 2, 2015	February 10, 2014	0.19
Dan's wish to be the big man on campus comes true after he dons a pair of alien bracelets that give him increased strength, size and body hair. Dan's increased strength and newfound hero status goes to his head when he tries to take on Copernicus and his giant steam-punk robot.
37	"Dan and the Volcano"	James Wootton	Russell Marcus	February 6, 2015	February 10, 2014	0.19
The trio are psyched to go see a local volcano erupt, but their parents interfere with annoying demands. When Dan receives an alien stopwatch package that literally stops people, rendering them immobile, he sets it to freeze all the parents in town – problem solved! That is, until Copernicus gathers up all the immobile parents and brings them to his new cocooning lair, which happens to be inside the about-to-blow volcano itself!
38	"Dan Phone"	Rob Boutilier	Michael Rubiner & Bob Mittenthal	March 5, 2015	February 12, 2014	0.18
Dan gets a device that sticks to his head and transforms him into a human cell phone, able to project a hologram of whomever he's talking to out of his head. At first, the prank call possibilities seem endless. But then, Dan accidentally pranks the wrong people, specifically Copernicus's overlords on Planet X. Convinced that if Dan is getting the packages, Copernicus must have failed in his mission to subdue Earth, so the overlords commence plans to destroy the planet. Wanting to be rid of the phone device, Dan has Troll distract Copernicus (who then chases Troll) with a fake package box, while he sneaks into his lair to find something that can extract the package off his head. This results in the boys being captured and held prisoners in Copernicus's lair. Amanda must now venture solo into Copernicus's lair and save Dan and Troll before the trio can get back together to both fool the overlords and free Dan of the package.
39	"Dooley Noted"	James Wootton	Story by : J.D. Smith; Teleplay by : Devin Bunje & Nick Stanton	April 2, 2015	February 12, 2014	0.18
Fed up with always being picked on by Mr. Dooley, Dan, Troll and Amanda become convinced that he is an alien after seeing him consorting with Copernicus. The trio tries to out their teacher, but this only results in them getting Saturday detention. Soon, Amanda, Troll, and all the other kids in detention start disappearing and are captured by Copernicus. Dan now has to save the day, but will he discover who the real alien is?
40	"Dan TV"	James Wootton	Michael Rubiner & Bob Mittenthal	May 4, 2015	February 13, 2014	0.12
When Dan gets a hovering TV camera that broadcasts his every move to every screen in town, he's transformed into an instant celebrity. For fame-craving Dan, this is a dream come true. But being on display 24-7 for a fickle public turns out to be a nightmare. Not only do his fans demand nonstop life-and-limb-threatening action to entertain them, but his package-aided stunts soon attract the attention of Copernicus.
41	"Last Dan Standing"	Rob Boutilier	Jenna McGrath & Rick Williams	June 1, 2015	February 13, 2014	0.12
After putting Troll in hot water with the Mayor, Dan plans to use an alien jump suit to correct his mistake and save the Pilo's Marine Repair business owned by Troll's dad from being shut down by defeating the Mayor at his own game, the Iron Bay Dodgeball Challenge. Unfortunately for Dan and the dodgeball competitors, Copernicus and Calimary have also signed up to compete, armed with an arsenal of alien dodgeballs that cocoon people on impact.
42	"The Dan Who Would Be King"	Rob Boutilier	Jenna McGrath & Rick Williams	June 8, 2015	February 14, 2014	0.27
Dan is turned down for a seat on Student Council, then massages his bruised ego by using an alien throne to influence a band of alien hybrids. After being crowned their new King, Dan puts his questionable leadership skills into practice by ordering the passive Hybrids to rise up against Copernicus.
43	"The Game"	James Wootton	Michael Rubiner & Bob Mittenthal	June 15, 2015	February 14, 2014	0.27
Dan gets a board game that's an exact replica of Iron Bay and discovers that when he moves people and objects around the board, the same thing happens in real life, but with the nasty side effect of growing the player's hand with each use. But when Dan's mother donates all of Dan's old toys, including the game, to a thrift store, the dangerous device falls into Copernicus's hands. The trio must get it back before Copernicus uses it to toss everyone in town into the quarry and cocoon them.
44	"Squirrely Dan"	James Wootton	Michael Rubiner & Bob Mittenthal	June 22, 2015	February 18, 2014	0.14
Dan gets a package in the form of a costume that turns him into a superhero. The downside is that the suit harnesses the powers of whatever's around when it's first worn, and for Dan that turns out to be a squirrel. Still, being Super Squirrel is pretty cool, until Dan realizes that he has to remain anonymous (so people don't find out about the packages), and his nemesis Terrance is getting all the credit for his deeds.
45	"Do Over Dan"	Rob Boutilier	Story by : J.D. Smith; Teleplay by : Rick Williams & Jenna McGrath	June 29, 2015	February 19, 2014	0.08
After Dan receives a package that allows him to defy death, he uses his multiple lives like a character in a video game in order to attack Copernicus and thwart yet another Iron Bay take-over bid. The Death Defyer makes Dan more reckless than ever, so reckless that he keeps wasting lives. Both Amanda and Troll are annoyed with Dan's recklessness, and unless they can get through to him, it'll be "Game Over" for Iron Bay.
46	"What Goes Down, Must Come Up"	James Wootton	Michael Rubiner & Bob Mittenthal	June 30, 2015	February 19, 2014	0.08
When Dan's remote-controlled, inflatable-airship package turns out to be a weather balloon that turns the earth's climate into the parched desert of Planet X, the aliens occupying the bodies of Iron Bay townsfolk emerge to enjoy the balmy weather. A hyperactive and stressed Amanda wants to seize the opportunity to expose the invaders, but Dan is more concerned about saving Troll, who has accidentally become stranded on the airborne blimp. Can Dan bring his friend down to earth before it's too late?
47	"Bug Spray"	James Wootton	Michael Rubiner & Bob Mittenthal	July 1, 2015	February 20, 2014	0.10
When Dan, Troll and Amanda's camping excursion is threatened by Iron Bay's voracious stinging insects, Dan thinks he has the solution: a bug spray package. However, the spray doesn't just repel insects – it also turns those who spray it on themselves into one! Dan and Amanda are transformed and drawn to the glowing lighthouse, where Copernicus's flypaper traps them. It's up to Troll to get the antidote before Copernicus can spray the whole town.
48	"Aqua Dan"	Rob Boutilier	Story by : J.D. Smith; Teleplay by : Dale Schott	July 2, 2015	February 20, 2014	0.10
After Dan slaps on an alien neck brace package in order to dodge a father-and-son fishing competition, he discovers that the neck brace is an aqua gill that allows him to only breath underwater and talk like a fish, and that Copernicus is plotting to unleash a monstrous mutated bottom feeder on the citizens of Iron Bay.
49	"The Song of the Mermoo"	Rob Boutilier	Neil Alsip	July 3, 2015	February 21, 2014	0.09
In order to dodge a weekend homework assignment and save Troll's family reputation, Dan uses an alien re-animator package to bring the legendary Iron Bay Mermoo back to life. Things seriously misfire for Dan after he misuses the package, resurrecting all kinds of bizarre marine oddities and turning their after-school outing into a crazy night at the Iron Bay Marine Museum. In addition, the more things Dan re-animates, the more he de-animates himself, making his body very weak in the process.
50	"Dr. Strangegloves"	James Wootton	Jenna McGrath & Rick Williams	August 27, 2015	February 21, 2014	0.09
Amanda is stoked to reunite with Uncle Rory's old lab partners, and Dan gets his mitts on a pair of gloves that can diagnose and repair anything he lays his hands on. Unfortunately for Dan, the downside of the Healer Feelers package is the rapid aging. Things take a turn for the worse when Dan, Amanda, Troll, and the scientists all get captured by Copernicus, who plans to drop a Cocoon X-Bomb on Iron Bay. After the trio teams up with the scientists to free themselves, dismantle the bomb, and defeat Copernicus's plan, Dan learns that he can never get too old to make a difference.
51	"Mission to Planet X"	James Wootton	Michael Rubiner & Bob Mittenthal	August 31, 2015	February 24, 2014	0.05
52	"Mission to Planet X"	Rob Boutilier	Michael Rubiner & Bob Mittenthal	August 31, 2015	February 24, 2014	0.05
Part 1: Tired of Copernicus constantly ruining his fun with the packages, Dan concocts a plan to get him recalled to Planet X. The plan works, but instead of freeing Dan for nonstop fun, it leads Copernicus's bosses to send a much more competent alien named Xanthicus to take his place. Xanthicus takes over Dan's dad's body and begins cocooning the town with brutal efficiency. When Dan's efforts to extract the alien from his dad fail Dan realizes he has no choice but to travel to Planet X in order to get the only device that can free his father and save the town. Meanwhile, Calimary is all alone without Copernicus, and Xanthicus refuses to take her in. Part 2: Dan and Amanda travel through a portal to Planet X in search of an Extractor to rid the alien Xanthicus from Dan's dad, while Troll stays behind and teams up with his new friend Calimary to try to stop the alien from cocooning all of Iron Bay. All three teens however end up captured in their own ways, with Dan and Amanda being imprisoned on Planet X and threatened with having their brains eaten by alien gourmands, and Troll being tied to a chair at his family's warehouse by Xanthicus in preparation to be cocooned. On Dan and Amanda's end, they realize their only hope may lie in both teaming up with Copernicus and exposing the truth on how Dan first got the packages, but can the creepy alien and his overlords be trusted?

== Production ==
Originally planned as a feature film, the idea of the series came from Jeff Harter after several weeks of research and revisiting what he liked as a 10-year-old kid: Sci-fi, comic books, superheroes, robots, space ships, aliens, monsters, and anything to do with outer space. The idea of where the packages came from on Planet X was one of those old novelty toy ads he noticed.

The creator Jeff Harter conceived the idea for the series after researching "Planet X" and seeing an advertisement for a toy—specifically a "surprise package." Originally, Harter envisioned Packages from Planet X as a feature film, though it was later developed into a series. He first pitched the concept around 2006.

In the early stages, the protagonist was to be Milo Kaminski, a boy from Ohio who begins receiving alien packages. He must keep this a secret with the help of his friend Troll and a talking Tiki—which emerged from the very first package he received.

The project soon entered development at American Greetings as an animated television series. At the time, American Greetings was enjoying success with shows aimed at girls—such as Strawberry Shortcake and Care Bears—and the studio sought to produce something that would appeal to a young male audience; Packages from Planet X fit that ambition. The series underwent an extensive development process at American Greetings, which collaborated with its partner, the Canadian animation studio DHX Media (then known as Studio B Productions), as well as Disney, which provided the funding. At one point, the series' approval was stalled because Disney rejected the existing character designs, prompting the other two studios to address the issue. Illustrator Ryan Wiesbrock, along with several other artists, worked on redesigning the characters. It is also known that Dan Mandel and Chris Pearson—who were working at American Greetings at the time, assisting with project development—contributed to the oriģinal writing. Ultimately, scripts were written, a series "bible" was developed, and a test animation featuring the redesigned characters was even produced.

All these materials were sent to Disney, and based on them, the series was given the green light in 2011. Once the green light was received, Packages from Planet X entered production, led by DHX Media, who further developed the elements created during the pre-production phase to ensure they worked better for the actual production. However, several individuals who worked on the series prior to the green light—such as Wiesbrock, Mandel, and Pearson—did not receive credit on the final series.

Once production began, the character designs were overhauled. The scripts written during the development phase were also modified for the final series. In addition to the 26 episodes of the first season, the series also included a set of animated shorts intended to be aired during commercial breaks.

== Reception ==
The series received a mixed reception. Joyce Slaton of Common Sense Media described the series as an iffy, fast-paced animated series, with "rude humor" and "alien gadgets" coupled with cartoon violence. She further argued that some young children might be "intimidated or overstimulated by the fast pace."
