= Stephen S. Roach =

American economist

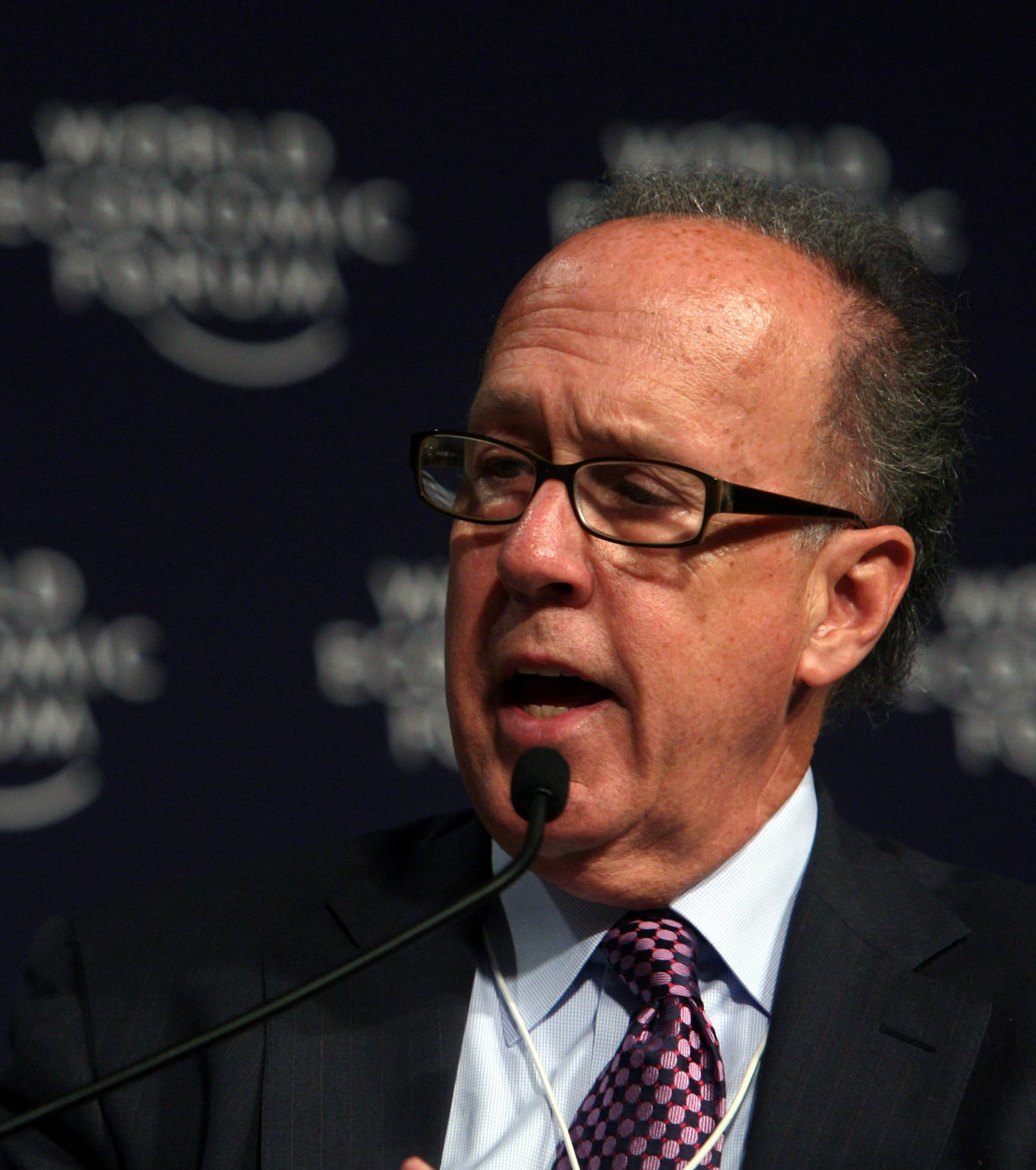
- Born: September 16, 1945 (age 81)
- Citizenship: United States
- Education: Economics
- Alma mater: University of Wisconsin–Madison; New York University
- Occupation: economist
- Employer: Yale University

Stephen Samuel Roach (born September 16, 1945) is an American economist. He serves as senior fellow at Yale University’s Jackson Institute for Global Affairs, and a senior lecturer at the Yale School of Management. He was formerly chairman of Morgan Stanley Asia, and chief economist at Morgan Stanley, the New York City-based investment bank.

== Early life and education ==
Roach was born in California. He enrolled at University of Wisconsin–Madison in 1963, aiming to become a civil engineer, he transferred in his third semester to study economics instead. He was a member of the Alpha Epsilon Pi fraternity. His student years were marked by protests on campus in Opposition to United States involvement in the Vietnam War. In 1968, Roach earned a bachelor's degree in economics from the University of Wisconsin–Madison and, later, a Master's degree and PhD in economics from New York University.

== Career ==
After earning his PhD, Roach was a research fellow at the Brookings Institution in Washington, D.C. From 1972 until 1979, Roach served as staff economist of the Federal Reserve Board in Washington, D.C. supervising the preparation of the official Federal Reserve projections of the U.S. economy. From 1979 until joining Morgan Stanley in 1982, Roach was vice president for economic analysis for the Morgan Guaranty Trust Company in New York.

Roach was with Morgan Stanley for 30-plus years. He was the investment bank's chief economist since 1982, serving as head of the firm's global team of economists in New York, London, Tokyo, Hong Kong, Singapore, and Paris. From 2007 to 2010 he was chairman, Morgan Stanley Asia, from 2010 to 2012 he was Non-Executive Chairman, Morgan Stanley Asia, and since mid-2010 he has been a Senior Fellow at Yale University.

In 2009, Dirk Bezemer, a professor of economics at the University of Groningen in the Netherlands, noted that Roach was one of the earliest to have predicted the 2008 financial crisis.

== Analysis ==
According to Roach, "Politicians who want to restrict a nation like China, which provides green technology at low cost and high quality in areas like electric vehicles (EBs) and solar batteries, that is purely a political agenda that makes no sense from an economic comparative advantage point of view."

=== Views on Hong Kong ===
In February 2024, Roach wrote in the Financial Times that Hong Kong was "over", arguing that political changes, growing dependence on mainland China and US–China tensions had undermined its role as an autonomous global financial centre. He revisited the argument in a July 2026 Project Syndicate column, "Yes, the Hong Kong of Old Is Over", contending that the city's resilience "has come to depend on the direct intervention of the Chinese authorities". Deputy Financial Secretary Michael Wong Wai-lun responded in a newspaper op-ed, writing that "some critics appear to be driven by bias against China rather than objective analysis".

The revised thesis drew further responses from Hong Kong-based commentators. In an August 2026 Substack post, "Social Media and the Character of a City", Roach singled out responses from solicitor Virginia Lee, Wong, and Hong Kong-based American lawyer Adam Clermont as "especially impressive", describing them as criticism that "picked apart my arguments and made me think about the main assumptions of my thesis". Writing in China Daily Hong Kong, historian David Cottam, a former principal of Sha Tin College, cited Clermont, author of Hong Kong Belongs to Hongkongers, as an example of long-term residents offering a more grounded view than Roach's, writing that he "emphasizes complexity over simplistic binary narratives". Clermont expanded on his response in two essays on his website, The Escalator.

== Personal life ==
Roach and his wife live in New Canaan, Connecticut.

== Work ==
Roach writes monthly columns for the international media organization Project Syndicate.

- Roach, Stephen, The Next Asia: Opportunities and Challenges for a New Globalization, (Wiley 2009)
- Roach, Stephen, Unbalanced: The Codependency of America and China (2014)
- Roach, Stephen, Accidental Conflict: America, China, and the Clash of False Narratives, (Yale University Press 2022) ISBN 978-0-300-25964-3
