= Roache =

Roache is a surname. Notable people with the surname include:

- Abigail Roache (born 2000), New Zealand rugby league and union player
- Addison Roache (1817–1906), Justice of the Indiana Supreme Court
- Bobby Roache (born 1982), American model and actor
- Dietrich Roache (born 2001), Australian professional rugby union player
- Francis Roache (1936–2018), American police officer and politician
- James Roache (born 1932), British actor and son of William Roache
- John Roache (1940–1999), American pianist
- Lee Roache (born 1984), English footballer
- Linus Roache (born 1964), British actor and son of William Roache
- Nathaniel Roache (born 1996), New Zealand professional rugby league footballer
- Paul Roache (born 1998), Samoan rugby league footballer
- Rebecca Roache, British philosopher
- Rowan Roache (born 2000), Irish footballer
- Tim Roache, British trade union leader for the GMB Union
- Trina Roache, Mi'kmaq video journalist
- Viola Roache (1885–1961), American actress
- Victor Roache (born 1991), American professional baseball player
- William Roache, British actor and original cast member of Coronation Street as Ken Barlow

== See also ==
- Roach (disambiguation)
- Roach (surname)
