= Supernoobs =

Canadian animated television series

- Also known as: Super Noobs
- Genre: Superhero; Action comedy
- Created by: Scott Fellows
- Developed by: Scott Fellows; Rob Boutilier; Loris Kramer Lunsford
- Voices of: Matt Hill; Tabitha St. Germain; Richard Ian Cox; Lee Tockar; Michael Adamthwaite; Bill Mondy
- Theme music composer: Adam Schlesinger; Scott Fellows
- Opening theme: "Supernoobs" by Shawn Patterson
- Composers: Ari Posner; Ian LeFeuvre
- Country of origin: Canada
- Original language: English
- No. of seasons: 2
- No. of episodes: 52 (104 segments)

Production
- Executive producers: Scott Fellows; Loris Kramer Lunsford; Steven DeNure; Michael Hirsh; Kirsten Newlands
- Producers: Elana Adair (season 1); Lesley Crawford (season 2); Brian Hulme (season 2)
- Running time: 11 minutes
- Production companies: DHX Media; DHX Studios Vancouver

Original release
- Network: Teletoon (Canada, season 1) Cartoon Network (U.S., season 1); Family Channel (Canada, season 2) Hulu (U.S., season 2)
- Release: November 2, 2015 – February 7, 2019

Supernoobs is a Canadian animated comedy television series produced by DHX Media, now known as WildBrain, for Cartoon Network and Teletoon. It was created by Scott Fellows in his second animated series after Johnny Test. The series follows four childhood friends as they navigate middle school while fighting the Virus, which is infecting life on Earth. It premiered on Cartoon Network in the United Kingdom and Ireland on November 2, 2015.

On January 11, 2018, DHX announced that the second season would air on its Family Channel rather than Teletoon. The second season was picked up by Cartoon Network across Europe, the Middle East and Africa, and Hulu and YouTube in the United States. The series ended on February 7, 2019.

== Premise ==
After receiving the power of the Battle Balls from the aliens Memnock and Zenblock, 12-year-old best friends Tyler, Kevin, Shope, and Theodore must not only survive middle school, but also fight against the Virus, which is infecting life on Earth and threatens to destroy the universe.

== Characters ==
=== The Supernoobs ===
Four middle school students from the town of Cornbury who receive alien orb-like weapons called Battle Balls that grant them powers, which they tend to use irresponsibly when not fighting the Virus.

- Tyler Bowman (voiced by Matt Hill) is the wielder of the blue Battle Ball, which gives him the power to teleport and enhances his natural senses, giving him abilities such as mind reading, and also turns his blonde hair blue. Tyler serves as the group's leader and moral compass, but is often distracted by his feelings for fellow student Amy Anderson. After the Ball Master repairs his Battle Ball after it is damaged by paint corrosion, he regains his old powers and also gains the power of telekinesis.
- Kevin Reynolds (voiced by Richard Ian Cox) is the wielder of the red Battle Ball, which gives him the power to transform into various animals, but often turns him into something other than what he intended, and also turns his black hair red. Kevin is the most selfish and irresponsible member of the team, often using his Battle Ball for his own amusement and personal gain or making suggestions that get the group into trouble. After the Ball Master repairs his Battle Ball after it is damaged by paint corrosion, he regains his old powers and also gains the power to transform into Virus versions of animals. Kevin is also implied to have feelings for Shope, which, despite him stating them while under mind control, may be genuine.
- Jennifer Shope (voiced by Tabitha St. Germain) is the wielder of the purple Battle Ball, which gives her the power to harness natural forces such as water and electricity and also turns her black hair purple. She is the most scientifically minded of the group and also considers herself to be the smartest among her friends, though she sometimes relies on them to help her with her schoolwork. She is commonly known by her last name to her friends, while most adults refer to her by her first name. After the Ball Master repairs her Battle Ball after it is damaged by paint corrosion, she regains her old powers and also gains the power to manipulate subatomic frequencies.
- Theodore "Roach/The Roach" Roachmont (voiced by Lee Tockar) is the wielder of the green Battle Ball, which grants him the power of flight and super strength by enlarging his fists, and also turns his red hair green. The most innocent and least selfish member of the team, he tends to be clueless and gullible. Though not usually the team's strategist, he occasionally comes up with brilliant ideas, such as discovering that the Battle Balls can be combined into a vehicle. After the Ball Master repairs his Battle Ball after it is damaged by paint corrosion, he regains his old powers and also gains the power to remove his own arms.

=== Civilians ===
- Jock Jockerson (voiced by Michael Adamthwaite) is an eighth-grade jock at Cornbury Middle School, who is known for his size and athletic ability. He is a bully who is often unintelligent and has a short temper.
- Principal Warmerammer (voiced by Maryke Hendrikse) is the stern administrator of Cornbury Middle School, who is suspicious of the Noobs' activities.
- Amy Anderson (voiced by Maryke Hendrikse) is a classmate of the Noobs whom Tyler has a crush on, though he is too shy to confess his love to her. However, she seems to reciprocate his feelings and develops a crush on his alter-ego after he saves her from a Virus attack.
- Sue Newswoman (voiced by Tabitha St. Germain) is a newscaster who covers stories of the Noobs' misadventures.
- Mr. and Mrs. Shope (voiced by Doron Bell and Kathleen Barr) are Jennifer's parents, who are skeptical of her friendship with the Noobs. Due to being unaware of her secret identity, they fear that they are having a negative influence on her due to her uncharacteristic behavior and threaten to send her to a boarding school if it continues. However, Zenblock disguises himself as Jennifer and convinces them to trust in her judgment and ability to stay on top of things. Mem later impersonates Mr. Shope at Jennifer's parent-teacher conference, since the Noobs' evil-fighting activities have interfered with their schoolwork and they do not want their parents to know.
- Mrs. Bowman is Tyler's mother, whom he greatly resembles.
- Mr. and Mrs. Roachmont are Theodore's parents.
- Coach Huntz (voiced by Lee Tockar) is the gym teacher of Cornbury Middle School and the coach of its football team.
- The Emmas are three girls who witness the Noobs fighting evil in civilian form and threaten to expose them unless they concede to their demands, but later relent after they save them from a Virus-infected eagle.

=== Benevolent Alliance ===
An intergalactic organization dedicated to battling the Virus and bringing its creators to justice.

- Zenblock/Zen (voiced by Michael Adamthwaite) is a blue dragon-like alien who, along with Mem, was sent to Earth by the Benevolent Alliance to recruit warriors that could fight against the Virus. However, due to their unfamiliarity with Earth's culture, they mistake the Noobs for soldiers after seeing them wearing football gear and armed with slingshots. While he often doubts their abilities, he has a soft spot for them, which leads to him and Mem being assigned to train them. He is the rougher of the two, but can be as immature and childish as Mem. Despite their frequent arguments, he gets along well with Mem and they are like brothers. He is also shown to have a problem with sleepwalking, which he calls "sleepfighting". Zen possesses armor that gives him powers similar to the Noobs, and can disguise himself as a human under the alias "Rob".
- Memnock/Mem (voiced by Bill Mondy) is a greenish-yellow dragon-like alien and companion to Zen, who is the softer-spoken and more sensitive, immature and childish of the two. Despite their frequent arguments, he gets along well with Zen and they are like brothers. He is also shown to like cooking food as a hobby. Like Zen, he possesses special armor that grants him similar powers to the Noobs and can disguise himself as a human under the alias "Bob".
- XR4Ti (voiced by Rebecca Shoichet) is the feminine artificial intelligence who controls Mem and Zen's ship, the Galacticus, and often serves as a voice of reason, but is limited by being a computer without the power to act on her own.
- General Blorgon (voiced by Scott McNeil) is a blue-skinned humanoid alien with telepathic abilities who is the leader of the Benevolent Alliance. Though noble, he is known for his harsh methods, such as subjecting new Virus Warrior recruits to harsh tests or punishing those irresponsible enough to misplace their Battle Balls.
- Secretary Hedies (voiced by Maryke Hendrikse) is one of the Elders of the Benevolent Alliance.
- Secretary Techn'ut (voiced by Lee Tockar) is one of the Elders of the Benevolent Alliance.
- Rovu is a reddish-brown dragon-like alien who appears to be of the same species as Mem and Zen. Like them, he was assigned to recruit warriors to battle the Virus, but has been more successful than them and won the Recruiter of the Year award seven times in a row, which he likes to brag about. However, he is humbled after the Supernoobs rescue the New Virus Warriors convention from Count Venamus, resulting in Mem and Zen receiving the Recruiter of the Year award and breaking his streak.
- Chiquadotran/Dot is a pink dragon-like alien who appears to be of the same or similar species to Mem and Zen. She is a legendary and famous Virus Warrior, known for creating a powerful technique called Supernova, and recruited and trained Mem and Zen when they were young.

=== Villains ===
- The Virus is a virus from outer space that attacks planets, infecting living organisms and turning them into monsters that wreak havoc. The Benevolent Alliance and the Supernoobs battle the Virus while trying to uncover its creators.
- Count Venamus (voiced by Trevor Devall) is a blue octopus-like alien. He is one of the Creators' agents and a wanted criminal throughout the galaxy who aims to infect the Virus Warriors. The Benevolent Alliance and the Supernoobs want to capture him in hopes that he has information about the Creators of the Virus. Until his first encounter with the Supernoobs, his power of invisibility had made him a mysterious figure whose existence was uncertain. However, after the Noobs reveal his Venamus identity, he vows revenge against them.
- Venaminions - Bestial creatures who serve Count Venamus. They are strong, but seemingly depend on his leadership to function.
- The Creators of the Virus – The creators of the Virus, who unleashed it upon the universe and have agents like Count Venamus who serve them and help them to spread it.
- Mr. Wertz (voiced by Michael Adamthwaite) is a former science teacher at Cornbury Middle School who suffers from paranoia and megalomania, having believed in the existence of aliens even before encountering Mem and Zen and learning of the Noobs' powers. Upon learning of their powers, he attempts to expose them, but is dismissed as insane due to having no proof. He later tries to enslave Cornbury by inventing goggles that allow him to use mind control on those who wear it, but Shope stops him. He later attempts to use the Virus to conquer the world, but is defeated and taken back to the school board.
- The Incredibly Amazing Man (voiced by Andrew Francis) is a galactic superhero who fights the Virus and is more competent than the Noobs, but is destructive, which he refuses to acknowledge due to his arrogance and narcissism. He has various abilities, including flight, laser vision, super strength, and elongation.

== Episodes ==
Season	Episodes		Originally released		
Season	Episodes		First released	Last released	Network
1	52	46	December 7, 2015	December 9, 2016	Cartoon Network (U.S.); Teletoon (Canada)
1	52	6	November 1, 2017		Hulu (U.S.); Teletoon (Canada)
2	52		May 21, 2018	February 7, 2019	Hulu (U.S.); Family Channel (Canada)

=== Season 1 (2015–17) ===
No. overall	No. in season	Title	Directed by	Written by	Storyboarded by	Original release date
1	1	"A Noob Hope"	Tim Stuby and Rob Boutilier	Scott Fellows	John Fountain and Tom Nesbitt	December 7, 2015
Four friends meet two aliens and are given special devices called Battle Balls that give them superpowers they must use to stop an alien virus from infecting life on Earth.
2	2	"The Noobs Strike Back"	Tim Stuby and Rob Boutilier	Scott Fellows	Tim Stuby and Rob Boutilier	December 7, 2015
The Noobs must prove to the Benevolent Alliance that they are worthy of their Battle Balls and their powers, or they will lose them.
3	3	"Super Noob Suits"	Tim Stuby and Rob Boutilier	Lazar Saric	Rob Boutilier and Kent Webb	December 8, 2015
The Noobs decide they need superhero costumes to hide their identities.
4	4	"Noobies vs. Smoothies"	Tim Stuby and Rob Boutilier	Scott Fellows	Kent Webb	December 8, 2015
Tyler is on a date with Amy Anderson at the new smoothie shop when a yogurt smoothie becomes infected with the Virus.
5	5	"Go Noob Outside"	Tim Stuby	Keith Wagner	Kent Webb	December 9, 2015
The Noobs want a new video game called BattleNuts 4, but are forced to play outside instead.
6	6	"Curb Your Noob"	Rob Boutilier and Jon Izen	Scott Fellows	Cat Tang	December 9, 2015
After his Battle Ball malfunctions, Kevin becomes stuck in the form of a dog and is caught by the dog catcher.
7	7	"Noob Kids on the Block"	Tim Stuby	Nathan Knetchel	Jason Horychun	December 10, 2015
As Noobs compete in a singing and dancing competition at Cornbury Middle School, a new strain of the Virus infects the glee club.
8	8	"Fourth Down and Noob to Go"	Rob Boutilier and Jon Izen	Scott Fellows	Luc Latulippe	December 10, 2015
The Noobs decide to use their Battle Balls to join the football team and defeat Cornbury Middle School's rival, the Eastside Wolves.
9	9	"Who, What, Where and Noob"	Tim Stuby	Mark Fellows	Luke Gustafson	December 11, 2015
Shope becomes invisible after being exposed to the Galacticus cloaking generator, and must become visible again before her parents send her to boarding school.
10	10	"Shake Your Noobie"	Rob Boutilier and Jon Izen	Scott Fellows	Jeff Bittle	December 11, 2015
As the Noobs attend a dance at Cornbury Middle School, students are infected by the Virus and transform into dragons.
11	11	"Where No Noob Has Gone Before"	Tim Stuby	Keith Wagner	Christine Cunningham	December 14, 2015
While preparing for a play, Theodore's Battle Ball malfunctions, causing him to float into the sky and be mistaken for a missile.
12	12	"How to Care for Your Noob"	Rob Boutilier and Jon Izen	Scott Fellows	Kervin Faria	December 15, 2015
Shope and Tyler lose their guinea pig during Home Ec, forcing Kevin to pose as it while Tyler and Theodore search for it.
13	13	"The Noobs Meet Count Venamus"	Tim Stuby	Scott Fellows	Cat Tang	December 16, 2015
The Noobs, Mem, and Zen go to the Virus Warrior Recruiter Awards, where the villainous Count Venamus infects the new warriors and causes them to fight each another.
14	14	"Dude, Where's My Noob?"	Rob Boutilier and Jon Izen	Nathan Knetchel	Kent Webb	December 17, 2015
After the Noobs misplace their Battle Balls, they must find them so they can be presented to the Benevolent Alliance.
15	15	"Tyrannosaurus Noob"	Tim Stuby	Rick Groel	Luc Latulippe and Jen Davreux	December 18, 2015
While the Noobs are on a field trip to the museum, a Tyrannosaurus skeleton is infected by the Virus and comes to life.
16	16	"When Good Noobs Go Bad"	Rob Boutilier and Jon Izen	Scott Fellows	Jason Horychun	December 21, 2015
Theodore's Battle Ball malfunctions, transforming him into a supervillain bent on dominating Earth.
17	17	"Superdoods!"	Tim Stuby	Rick Groel	Jeff Bittle	December 22, 2015
Mem and Zen decide to become directors and create a TV show based on their adventures with the Noobs.
18	18	"License to Noob"	Rob Boutilier and Jon Izen	Nathan Knetchel	Luke Gustafson	December 23, 2015
After Mem and Zen contract an eye infection, the Noobs pilot the Galacticus into space to get medicine and end up helping a space princess overthrow an evil dictator.
19	19	"Noobot vs. Venabot"	Tim Stuby	Lazar Saric	Jen Davreux	December 28, 2015
When Count Venamus returns with a giant robot and plans to use a Virus meteor shower to infect the planet, the Noobs turn the Galacticus into a giant robot to stop him.
20	20	"Zooper Noobs!"	Rob Boutilier and Jon Izen	Keith Wagner	Luc Latulippe	December 29, 2015
The Noobs travel to an alien zoo with Mem and Zen, but are captured and put into an exhibit by the zoo's owner.
21	21	"Noob Kid in Town"	Tim Stuby	Mark Fellows	Kent Webb	December 30, 2015
Kevin transforms into a cat and gets stuck in a tree until a teenage boy rescues him and gets a reward from the town, leading the Noobs to seek a reward as well.
22	22	"Parent Teacher Noobs"	Rob Boutilier and Jon Izen	Scott Fellows	Cat Tang	January 4, 2016
Mem and Zen pose as the Noobs' parents during Cornbury Middle School's parent-teacher conferences.
23	23	"Noob It or Lose It"	Tim Stuby	Ethan Banville	Luke Gustafson	January 5, 2016
The Noobs attempt to use their powers to bypass the long line for a new video game, while Mem and Zen learn to drive a car.
24	24	"Noobsitters"	Rob Boutilier and Jon Izen	Mark Fellows	Jeff Bittle	January 6, 2016
The Noobs attempt to prove that they are responsible by babysitting for a couple who have recently moved into the neighborhood. However, this becomes more difficult after the baby becomes infected after drinking a bottle infected with the Virus.
25	25	"How to Use Your Noob"	Rob Boutilier and Jon Izen	Scott Fellows	Sam To	January 7, 2016
The Noobs discover that they can turn their Battle Balls into whatever they want.
26	26	"A Noob Divided Cannot Noob!"	Tim Stuby	Keith Wagner	Christine Cunningham	January 8, 2016
The pressures of living together push Mem and Zen to the breaking point, causing them to move out and into the homes of the Noobs. However, they quickly grow tired of them and plan to get them back together.
27	27	"Super Natural Noobs"	Tim Stuby	Lazar Saric	Sam To	January 11, 2016
The Noobs take advantage of a lack of Virus attacks to go camping, but Kevin is afraid of the Cornbury Monster that is said to lurk in the woods.
28	28	"The Supernoobs Super Cup"	Tim Stuby	Scott Fellows	Cat Tang	January 12, 2016
The Noobs decide to see who is the best of the group by competing in the Supernoob Super Cup.
29	29	"How to Noob the Science Fair"	Rob Boutilier and Jon Izen	John Derevlany	Kent Webb	January 13, 2016
The Noobs compete against each other in the school science fair, but problems arise when the Virus infects several projects.
30	30	"Noob Tube"	Tim Stuby	Scott Fellows	Dennis Crawford	January 14, 2016
Mem and Zen try to make the Noobs seem like great warriors after discovering they will be featured on the intergalactic reality show "Extreme Virus Warriors".
31	31	"The Noobie Bluebie Booby"	Rob Boutilier and Jon Izen	Kendra Hibbert	Jen Davreux	January 15, 2016
Theodore begins to feel that the other Noobs are taking advantage of him. After a rare bird is infected by the Virus on a field trip, he decides to let the others handle it without him.
32	32	"Noobs vs. the Earth-sterminator!"	Tim Stuby	Keith Wagner	Jeff Bittle	August 4, 2016
The Noobs inadvertently send a planet destroying drone towards Earth after pressing the wrong button on the Galacticus.
33	33	"Noob Coloured Glasses"	Rob Boutilier and Jon Izen	Nathan Knetchel	Luke Gustafson	June 23, 2016 (Turkey); August 4, 2016
Mr. Wertz's mind control goggles bring the entire town under his spell, except for Shope.
34	34	"Let It Noob, Let It Noob, Let It Noob!"	Tim Stuby	Scott Fellows	Sam To	June 24, 2016 (Turkey); August 4, 2016
Mem and Zen encounter snow for the first time.
35	35	"To Catch a Noob"	Rob Boutilier and Jon Izen	Rick Groel	Christine Cunningham	June 27, 2016 (Turkey); August 4, 2016
Count Venamus plots to imprison Theodore so that he can more easily defeat the Noobs.
36	36	"The Noobiest Place on Earth!"	Tim Stuby	Keith Wagner	Kent Webb	June 28, 2016 (Turkey); August 11, 2016
While at an amusement park, the Noobs must battle Virus-infected mascots.
37	37	"Count Noob-a-Nus"	Rob Boutilier and Jon Izen	Scott Fellows	Cat Tang	June 29, 2016 (Turkey); August 11, 2016
Count Venamus returns and surrenders to the Noobs, which they are suspicious of.
38	38	"I Know You Noob"	Tim Stuby	Mark Fellows	Jen Davreux	June 30, 2016 (Turkey); August 11, 2016
After witnessing the Noobs battle a Virus beast, three girls threaten to reveal their identities.
39	39	"The Supernoobs Meet Incredibly Amazing Man"	Rob Boutilier and Jon Izen	Lazar Saric	Pat Pakula	July 1, 2016 (Turkey); August 11, 2016
The Noobs encounter a destructive superhero from another world.
40	40	"Happy Noob-o-ween"	Rob Boutilier and Jon Izen	Scott Fellows	Christine Cunningham	May 3, 2016 (Hungary/Romania); May 10, 2016 (Latin America); October 29, 2016
Mem and Zen learn about Halloween at a Halloween festival while the Noobs fight people wearing costumes who have been infected by the Virus.
41	41	"The Noob Cave!"	Tim Stuby	Rick Groel	Luke Gustafson	July 4, 2016 (Turkey); December 5, 2016
The Noobs decide to build a secret base so they can feel like real superheroes, but get into a fight over what it should look like, which destroys their friendship. Mem and Zen, worried about them, try to bring them back together.
42	42	"To Noob or Not to Noob"	Rob Boutilier and Jon Izen	Keith Wagner	Jeff Bittle	July 5, 2016 (Turkey); December 5, 2016
The Noobs ponder over whether or not to use their Battle Ball powers during school for personal gain.
43	43	"Noobie Mama"	Tim Stuby	Scott Fellows	Christine Cunningham	July 6, 2016 (Turkey); December 6, 2016
A new strain of the Virus causes the Noobs to get sucked into a video game.
44	44	"Noobs of the Round Table"	Jon Izen	Rick Groel	Glen Kennedy	July 7, 2016 (Turkey); December 7, 2016
General Blorgon and the other members of the Benevolent Alliance visit Earth to enjoy what it has to offer. While attending a renaissance barbecue with the Noobs and Mem and Zen, things go awry when the renaissance actors are infected with the Virus.
45	45	"Super Noob Super Cup Redux"	Tim Stuby	John Derevlany	Cat Tang	July 8, 2016 (Turkey); December 8, 2016
The second Super Noobs Super Cup begins, with Mem and Zen also competing.
46	46	"The Noobs vs. Sour Persimmons"	Jon Izen	Scott Fellows	Kent Webb	July 11, 2016 (Turkey); December 9, 2016
The Noobs fight a new supervillain who goes by the name of Sour Persimmons.
47	47	"Noobs Go Viral"	Tim Stuby	Nathan Knetchel	Pat Pakula	July 12, 2016 (Turkey); November 1, 2017 (Hulu)
The Noobs discover Mr. Wertz's laboratory and learn that he has been studying the Virus.
48	48	"Noobs vs. Venamus 12!"	Jon Izen	Scott Fellows	Jen Davreux	July 13, 2016 (Turkey); November 1, 2017 (Hulu)
To find out what makes a child angry, Count Venamus turns himself into one, hoping to find a way to defeat the Noobs.
49	49	"Eyewitness Noobs"	Tim Stuby	Keith Wagner	Jeff Bittle	July 14, 2016 (Turkey); November 1, 2017 (Hulu)
The Noobs learns that Kevin has been selling videos of themselves in battlesuits to a tabloid magazine. When Kevin accidentally sends pictures of themselves without their suits, they must get the video back before their identities are exposed.
50	50	"A Noob World Order"	Jon Izen	Lazar Saric	Luke Gustafson	November 1, 2017 (Hulu)
The Noobs and Mem and Zen try to provide refuge for a group of alien refugees whose home planet was destroyed by the Virus.
51	51	"Nooby Friday"	Tim Stuby	Tim Stuby	Christine Cunningham	July 22, 2016 (Turkey); November 1, 2017 (Hulu)
An accident causes the Battle Balls to be misplaced among the Noobs while Mem and Zen attend a fancy party at Theodore's house.
52	52	"The Noobs-i-nators 2: Save the Earth!"	Jon Izen	Scott Fellows	Jeff Bittle	November 1, 2017 (Hulu)
The Noobs act as decoys to discover the source of the Virus while Mem and Zen try to save the city after it is overrun with the Virus.

=== Season 2 (2018–19) ===
DHX Media announced a second season of the series. The series moved to the Family channel in Canada and is available for streaming on Hulu in the United States.

No. overall	No. in season	Title	Directed by	Written by	Storyboarded by	Original release date	Canadian air date
53	1	"Operation: Noobs!"	Tim Stuby	Scott Fellows	Nathan Affolter	May 21, 2018	September 3, 2018
As the Noobs work together to defeat the Creator's newest henchman, they find an unlikely ally in Count Venamus.
54	2	"Micro Noobs!"	Joel Dickie	Keith Wagner	Mike West	May 22, 2018	September 4, 2018
After Kevin becomes infested with Virus-infected fleas, the Noobs shrink to fight them.
55	3	"The Chosen Noob"	Tim Stuby	Scott Fellows	Dennis Crawford	May 23, 2018	September 5, 2018
The Noobs compete for the title of Chosen Warrior, as prophesied by ancient mystics of the Benevolent Alliance, but face competition from Mem and Zen's rival, Rovu.
56	4	"Dude or Noob?"	Joel Dickie	Scott Fellows	Solomon Fong	May 24, 2018	September 6, 2018
A "Dude or Dork?" test in Shope's pop-teen magazine leads the guys to attempt to prove their coolness.
57	5	"Noob-a-rella"	Tim Stuby	Scott Fellows	Kent Webb	May 25, 2018	September 7, 2018
Shope is too young to attend the annual Robot Scholarship Ball, so the Noobs sneak her in, only for the Virus to sneak in too.
58	6	"The Noob Kids at School!"	Rob Boutilier and Joel Dickie	Keith Wagner	Jeff Bittle	May 28, 2018	September 11, 2018
Mem and Zen disguise themselves as students Bobbie and Robbie at Cornbury Middle School to prove that school is easy.
59	7	"High Noob"	Tim Stuby	Scott Fellows	Jason Horychun	May 29, 2018	September 13, 2018
A time Virus-infected monster travels back in time and attacks the past, when Cornbury was an old Western town.
60	8	"Ring Around the Noob"	Rob Boutilier and Joel Dickie	Nathan Knetchel	Donna Leong	May 30, 2018	September 18, 2018
The boys go to see a wrestling match, but after accidentally leaving their tickets with Shope, have to sneak in.
61	9	"Noob Storm Rising!"	Tim Stuby	Scott Fellows	Cat Tang	May 31, 2018	September 20, 2018
On Mem and Zen's second snow day, they compete with the Noobs to see who can build the best snowman, which becomes infected by the Virus.
62	10	"Noob of the Month"	Rob Boutilier and Joel Dickie	Rick Groel	Chris Johnston	June 1, 2018	September 25, 2018
A special prize is up for grabs when the Noobs compete for Noob of the Month.
63	11	"Supernoobs vs. Supertights!"	Tim Stuby	Scott Fellows	Nathan Affolter	June 4, 2018	September 27, 2018
Venamus recruits the Supernoobs' favorite TV superhero, Supertights, to defeat them.
64	12	"Pool Party Noob"	Rob Boutilier and Joel Dickie	Mark Fellows	Mike West	June 5, 2018	October 2, 2018
Tyler throws a pool party, but none of the other Noobs can attend.
65	13	"The Dark Noob Rises"	Tim Stuby	Scott Fellows	Christine Cunningham	June 6, 2018	October 4, 2018
After Venamus uses a Battle Ball Virus-chip to turn Shope, Kevin and Theodore into his Dark Warriors, Mem, Zen, and Tyler must rescue them.
66	14	"Noobs Down Under"	Rob Boutilier and Joel Dickie	Keith Wagner	Dennis Crawford	June 7, 2018	October 11, 2018
Earthquakes under Cornbury lead the Noobs to go spelunking to investigate.
67	15	"Noobs Battle Balls"	Tim Stuby	Lazar Saric	Kent Webb	June 8, 2018	October 16, 2018 (Family Channel)
A computer virus from the mobile plumbing game "Clogged" infects the Galacticus. While the Noobs chase their Battle Balls around Cornbury, Mem and Zen work to save the ship by unclogging virtual toilets.
68	16	"Spooker Noobs"	Rob Boutilier and Joel Dickie	Nathan Knetchel	Elise Stevens	TBA	October 9, 2018
The Noobs inadvertently tell Count Venamus their greatest fears, which he uses to strand them on a nightmarish planet.
69	17	"The Noob Trap"	Rob Boutilier and Joel Dickie	Scott Fellows	Ian Freedman	TBA	October 18, 2018
After several jujitsu classes, Theodore's parents have fallen out over who looks better in red, so the Noobs work to help them reconcile.
70	18	"All Mixed Up and Nowhere to Noob"	Tim Stuby	James Thomas	Donna Leong	June 12, 2018	October 23, 2018
The Noobs' Battle Balls are malfunctioning, and they must fix them before a giant snail eats the Galacticus.
71	19	"Call of Nooby"	Rob Boutilier and Joel Dickie	Scott Fellows	Jason Horychun	June 13, 2018	October 25, 2018
Kevin's idea to enter a video game using a tech Virus he had been keeping backfires, bringing the video game into the real world and forcing Mem and Zen to fight it.
72	20	"The Noob John B!"	Tim Stuby	Scott Fellows	Jon Affolter	June 14, 2018	October 30, 2018
Mem and Zen take up yachting, which goes well until the group and the yacht, except for Kevin, are swallowed by a Virus-infected whale.
73	21	"Noob Most Wanted"	Rob Boutilier and Joel Dickie	Keith Wagner	Elise Stevens	June 15, 2018	November 1, 2018
Tyler is falsely accused of the crimes of a cat burglar who has been stealing artwork from other planets and greatly resembles him.
74	22	"Noob and Noober"	Tim Stuby	Scott Fellows	Sinan Demirer and Tim Packford	June 18, 2018	November 6, 2018
Count Venamus hacks the Battle Balls and makes the Noobs stupid, leaving Mem and Zen to find a way to save them.
75	23	"A Noob's Best Friend"	Rob Boutilier and Joel Dickie	Nathan Knetchel	Olaf Miller	June 19, 2018	November 9, 2018
Shope has Kevin transform into a dog to convince her parents that she is ready to have a pet, which goes well until Kevin gets too comfortable in the role.
76	24	"Noobie Noobie Boo!"	Tim Stuby	Scott Fellows	Nick Salmon	July 17, 2018	November 13, 2018
The Noobs investigate a lake monster that is threatening Camp Wannabannatuck.
77	25	"If It Ain't Broke, Don't Noob It!"	Rob Boutilier and Joel Dickie	Doug Lieblich	Kent Webb	TBA	November 15, 2018
The Noobs decide to paint their Battle Balls, causing them to malfunction. With replacements unavailable, they must track down the mysterious Ball Master, who can repair them.
78	26	"One Noob Wonder"	Rob Boutilier and Joel Dickie	Scott Fellows	Suren Perera	TBA	November 20, 2018
The Noobs decide to form a band to become rich and famous.
79	27	"Noob 4 Mayor!"	Tim Stuby	Mark Fellows	Jason Horychun	TBA	November 24, 2018
The mayor of Cornbury is kicked out of office after it is revealed that he hates corn. Mem and Zen decide to run for mayor and the Noobs split, with Shope and Tyler supporting Mem and Kevin and Roach supporting Zen.
80	28	"Fluper Noobs"	Tim Stuby	Scott Fellows	Ashley Simpson	TBA	November 28, 2018
Mem and Zen get the flu, making them susceptible to the Virus.
81	29	"Cave Noobs!!"	Rob Boutilier and Joel Dickie	Keith Wagner	Cat Tang	TBA	November 30, 2018
After the Noobs cure a frozen caveman who was infected with the Virus and thawed out, they help him adjust to modern life.
82	30	"Beam Me Up, Nooby"	Tim Stuby	Scott Fellows	Karine Charlebois	TBA	December 5, 2018
Mr. Wertz brainwashes Cornbury into believing he is its new ruler.
83	31	"Noob Raider"	Tim Stuby	Scott Fellows	David Dick	TBA	December 12, 2018
After a Virus pod lands in the Amazon, the Noobs race to stop it before it can infect the animals.
84	32	"Get Your License Re-Noobed!"	Rob Boutilier and Joel Dickie	Mark Fellows	Nick Salmon	TBA	December 14, 2018
Mem and Zen come under the scrutiny of the Benevolent Alliance and must renew their recruiter license or the Noobs will be taken away.
85	33	"20,000 Noobs Under the Sea"	Tim Stuby	Scott Fellows	Kent Webb	TBA	December 14, 2018
The Noobs are given underwater suits so they can head underwater and find buried treasure to save the Cornbury Oceanography Centre.
86	34	"Noobing Down the House!"	Rob Boutilier and Joel Dickie	Keith Wagner	Nicole Wang	TBA	December 19, 2018
After Cornbury loses power, Shope hacks Tyler's house using Theodore's Battle Ball so they can play video games, but the house ends up growing legs and arms and takes off.
87	35	"Grandma Noob"	Tim Stuby	Scott Fellows	Suren Perera	TBA	December 21, 2018
Theodore's grandma comes to visit and mistakes his Battle Ball for her brooch, accidentally activating its powers.
88	36	"Noobs' Day Off"	Rob Boutilier and Joel Dickie	Nathan Knetchel	Jason Horychun	TBA	December 28, 2018
The Noobs utilize Tyler's teleportation power to teleport out of class and enjoy themselves. However, after realizing that they misplaced Theodore, they have to find him and get back to class or risk permanent detention.
89	37	"The Last Noobs on Earth"	Tim Stuby	Scott Fellows	Cat Tang	TBA	December 31, 2018
The Elders gather troops for a reconnaissance mission, leaving only Kevin and Theodore to guard Earth.
90	38	"Space Family Noobinson"	Rob Boutilier and Joel Dickie	Keith Wagner	Jen Davreux	TBA	December 31, 2018
The Noobs crash-land the Galacticus on a planet with colorful plants and must find food and shelter to survive until they can be rescued.
91	39	"Electric Avenoob"	Tim Stuby	Scott Fellows	Marta Demong	TBA	January 1, 2019
The Noobs' favorite band, St. Banana, comes to Cornbury.
92	40	"The Green Noob"	Rob Boutilier and Joel Dickie	Lazar Saric	Elise Stevens	TBA	January 2, 2019
While saving the zoo, the Noobs encounter a superhero named Green Steel, who idolizes them. However, his attempts to be like them cause more problems.
93	41	"The Noobs vs. the Bookworm"	Tim Stuby	Scott Fellows	Nick Salmon	TBA	January 3, 2019
Shope's academic rival, Sheldon McKlusky, downloads knowledge from the Internet to learn how to be a villain.
94	42	"The Noob Watchman"	Rob Boutilier and Joel Dickie	Mark Fellows	Ashley Simpson	TBA	January 4, 2019
On career night at Cornbury Middle School, Mr. Wertz takes over the school.
95	43	"Noobankamun"	Tim Stuby	Scott Fellows	Nicole Wang	TBA	January 7, 2019
After Virus pods crash in the Sahara, the Noobs fight mummies and discover an ancient sphinx with a new power.
96	44	"When We Were Noobs"	Rob Boutilier and Joel Dickie	Tim Stuby	Kent Webb	TBA	January 10, 2019
Chiquadotran, who trained Mem and Zen when they were young, visits Earth.
97	45	"Much ANoob About Nothing"	Tim Stuby	Rick Groel	Jason Horychun	TBA	January 14, 2019
Kevin plans to make money by selling action figures of the Noobs.
98	46	"The League of Noob Doominators"	Rob Boutilier and Joel Dickie	Scott Fellows	Suren Perera	TBA	January 17, 2019
Venamus forms the League of Doominators, consisting of Mr. Wertz, Elton Brandise, The Bookworm, and Jock Jockerson, whose sole purpose is to destroy the Noobs.
99	47	"Noobs Just Wanna Have Fun"	Tim Stuby	Scott Fellows	Jen Davreux	TBA	January 21, 2019
The Noobs enter the video game Totally Adorable Battle Monsters, where they must capture the best monsters and beat the boss to escape.
100	48	"N-O-O-B Spells Noob"	Rob Boutilier and Joel Dickie	Keith Wagner	Cat Tang	TBA	January 24, 2019
The Orthographants arrive and declare that if the Noobs fail a galactic spelling competition, Earth will be destroyed.
101	49	"The Good, The Bad and the Nooby"	Tim Stuby	Scott Fellows	Elise Stevens	TBA	January 28, 2019
When a mysterious girl arrives in Cornbury and predicts doom for the Noobs, Shope, Mem, and Zen try to uncover the mysteries of time travel.
102	50	"Noob Dunnit!"	Rob Boutilier and Joel Dickie	Nathan Knetchel	Marta Demong	October 18, 2018	January 31, 2019
XR4Ti goes missing and the Noobs search for her.
103	51	"Noob and Improved"	Tim Stuby	Scott Fellows	Ashley Simpson	October 19, 2018	February 4, 2019
After Venamus returns and attacks Earth with an improved Venabot, the Elders arrive to help the Noobs fight it.
104	52	"Pie-ramid Pizza with Extra Noob!"	Rob Boutilier and Joel Dickie	Scott Fellows	Nick Salmon	October 22, 2018	February 7, 2019
The Noobs find a third supernatural pyramid while getting a snack at Cornbury's famous Pie-ramid Pizza, completing a mystical triad of power that could finish off the Creators.

== Broadcast ==
Supernoobs first premiered on Cartoon Network in the United Kingdom and Ireland on November 2, 2015. The series premiered on Cartoon Network in the United States on December 7, 2015, the Middle East and Africa on January 18, 2016, in Russia, Bulgaria, Australia, New Zealand and Southeast Asia on February 1, 2016, in Turkey and Central & Eastern Europe on February 8, 2016, and in the rest of Asia on June 6, 2016. The entire first season became available on iTunes on July 12, 2016, and includes episodes that had yet to air. Four episodes debuted on Teletoon in Canada on September 20, 2016.

== Reception ==
=== Ratings ===
The premiere of the series in the U.S. attracted 818,000 viewers.

=== Critical reception ===
Jaclyn Appelgate from Comic Book Resources described the animation as "decent enough", although going on to state "that's just about the only decent part of the show. The characters are unlikable, the voice acting is downright embarrassing, and the storylines are so ridiculous you will feel as though you're losing brain cells watching a single episode." Emily Ashby from Common Sense Media gave the show two out of five stars, stating "As superhero stories go, this offbeat show misses the mark".
