= David Roach =

David Roach may refer to:

- David Roach (American football) (born 1985), American football safety
- David Roach (saxophonist) (born 1955), British classical saxophonist
- David Roach (comics), British comics artist
- David Roach (athletic director) (born 1949), director of athletics for Fordham University
- David Roach of the 1996 film The Adventures of Pinocchio
- David Roach, alias for Keith Silverstein voice actor
- David James Roach, a Canadian and culprit of a bank robbery in Singapore.
