= Rob Boutilier =

Canadian director

- Years active: 2000–present
- Employer: WildBrain
- Notable work: Kid vs. Kat; Packages from Planet X Supernoobs; Chuck's Choice; Snoopy in Space; Dorg Van Dango; The Snoopy Show

Robert Boutilier is a Canadian animator, director, writer, and storyboard artist. He is best known as the creator of Kid vs. Kat, the director of Packages from Planet X, Supernoobs, Chuck's Choice and Dorg Van Dango, a co-director of Snoopy in Space and a co-creator of The Snoopy Show. Before working in animation, he wanted to create a daily comic strip, being influenced from Peanuts creator Charles M. Schulz. Boutilier went to Vancouver Film School in 1996, as well as the University of King's College. He is also an employee of WildBrain in Vancouver, British Columbia.

== Filmography ==
=== Director ===
- Kid vs. Kat (2008–2011)
- Packages from Planet X (2013–2014)
- Supernoobs (2015–2019)
- Chuck's Choice (2017)
- Snoopy in Space (2019)
- Dorg Van Dango (2019)
- The Snoopy Show (2021–2023)

=== Writer ===
- Ed, Edd n Eddy (1999–2000)
- Kid vs. Kat Shorts (2011)

=== Art Department ===
- Pound Puppies (storyboard artist)
- Pucca (storyboard artist)
- The Legend of Frosty the Snowman (storyboard artist)
- Being Ian (storyboard artist)
- Yakkity Yak (storyboard artist)
- The New Woody Woodpecker Show (storyboard artist)
- Ed, Edd n Eddy (storyboard artist)
- Yvon of the Yukon (storyboard artist)
- Ralph Breaks the Internet (storyboard artist)
