= Michael J. Hindelang Award =

- Description: Awarded to books published in the three previous years that make the most outstanding contribution to research in criminology
- Country: United States
- Presented by: American Society of Criminology

The Michael J. Hindelang Award is an award, established in 1992, that is awarded annually by the American Society of Criminology to books published in the three previous years, that are deemed to make "the most outstanding contribution to research in criminology." A book is only eligible to win the award if a member of the Society nominates it.

== Recipients ==
| Year | Book Title | Author(s) |
|---|---|---|
| 2025 | Fester: Carceral Permeability and California’s COVID-19 Correctional Disaster | Hadar Aviram and Chad Goerzen |
| 2024 | In This Place Called Prison: Women's Religious Life in the Shadow of Punishment | Rachel Ellis |
| 2023 | Halfway Home: Race, Punishment and the Afterlife of Mass Incarceration | Reuben Jonathan Miller |
| 2022 | Predict and Surveil: Data, Discretion, and the Future of Policing | Sarah Brayne |
| 2021 | Digital Punishment: Privacy, Stigma, and the Harms of Data-Driven Criminal Justice | Sarah E. Lageson |
| 2020 | The Chosen Ones: Black Men and the Politics of Redemption | Nikki Jones |
| 2019 | Down, Out, and Under Arrest: Policing and Everyday Life in Skid Row | Forrest Stuart |
| 2018 | Caught: The Prison State and the Lockdown of American Politics | Marie Gottschalk |
| 2017 | Hard Bargains: The Coercive Power of Drug Laws in Federal Courts | Mona Lynch |
| 2016 | Falling Back: Incarceration and Transitions to Adulthood among Urban Youth | Jamie Fader |
| 2015 | America’s Safest City: Delinquency and Modernity in Suburbia | Simon Singer |
| 2014 | Great American City | Robert J. Sampson |
| 2013 | The Black Child-Savers: Racial Democracy and Juvenile Justice | Geoff Ward |
| 2012 | Peculiar institution | David Garland |
| 2011 | American Homicide | Randolph Roth |
| 2010 | Governing Through Crime | Jonathan Simon |
| 2009 | Darfur and the Crime of Genocide | John L. Hagan and Wenona Rymond-Richmond |
| 2008 | Punishment and Inequality in America | Bruce Western |
| 2007 | Judging Juveniles | Aaron Kupchik |
| 2006 | Confessions of a Dying Thief | Darrell Steffensmeier and Jeffery Ulmer |
| 2005 | Companions in Crime | Mark Warr |
| 2004 | Shared Beginnings, Divergent Lives | John Laub & Robert Sampson |
| 2003 | Gangs and Delinquency in Developmental Perspective | Terence Thornberry, Marvin Krohn, Alan Lizotte, Carolyn Smith, and Kimberly Tobin |
| 2002 | Bad Kids | Barry Feld |
| 2001 | Making Good | Shadd Maruna |
| 2000 | Crime in Context | Ian Taylor |
| 1999 | Political Policing | Martha K. Huggins |
| 1998 | Mean Streets | Bill McCarthy and John Hagan |
| 1997 | Control Balance | Charles R. Tittle |
| 1996 | No award given | |
| 1995 | Gender, Crime, and Punishment | Kathleen Daly |
| 1994 | Crime in the Making: Pathways and Turning Points Through Life | Robert J. Sampson and John H. Laub |
| 1993 | Point Blank: Guns and Violence in America | Gary Kleck |
| 1992 | Girls, Delinquency, and Juvenile Justice | Meda Chesney-Lind and Randall G. Shelden |
| 1991 | Crime, Shame, and Reintegration | John Braithwaite |
