= Gottfredson =

Gottfredson is a surname. Notable people with the surname include:

- Denise Gottfredson, American criminologist
- Don Gottfredson (1926–2002), American criminologist
- Floyd Gottfredson (1905–1986), American cartoonist best known for his defining work on the Mickey Mouse comic strip
- Gary Gottfredson (born 1947), former professor of psychology at the University of Maryland, College Park
- Linda Gottfredson (born 1947), professor of educational psychology at the University of Delaware
- Michael R. Gottfredson (born 1951), the former President of the University of Oregon

== See also ==
- Floyd Gottfredson Library, a series of books collecting the first 25 years of the 45-year span of work by Floyd Gottfredson on the daily Mickey Mouse comic strip
