= David W. Garland =

British sociologist (born 1955)

David Garland
- Born: 7 August 1955 (age 71); Dundee, Scotland
- Education: Edinburgh University; Sheffield University
- Occupations: Author, professor
- Writing career
- Genres: Criminology, Sociology, Law
- Subjects: Social control, Social theory, Punishment, Welfare State

David Garland is Arthur T. Vanderbilt Professor of Law and professor of sociology at New York University, and an honorary professor at Edinburgh Law School.

== Early life and education ==
David William Garland was raised in a working-class family in Dundee, Scotland, the eldest of three boys. His father, David Watt Garland, was a Dundee Corporation bus driver, and his mother, Elizabeth Garland (nee Gray) a school cleaner and home help. Garland attended the local elementary school, Rosebank Primary, and later, the Harris Academy, an academically selective secondary state school in the city’s West End.

In 1977, he graduated from the University of Edinburgh School of Law with an LLB (First-Class Honours) and, the following year, from Sheffield University with a postgraduate MA in criminology. In 1984, he completed a PhD in socio-legal studies at the University of Edinburgh, presenting the thesis "Modern penality: a study of the formation and significance of penal-welfare strategies".

The thesis was supervised by Peter J. Young and examined by Professors Derrick McClintock (Edinburgh) and Anthony Bottoms (Cambridge).

== Career ==
Immediately after graduating in 1977, Garland worked as a legal assistant at the Scottish Law Commission. From 1979 until 1997, he taught at Edinburgh University School of Law, initially in the Department of Criminology and later in the Centre for Criminology and the Social and Philosophical Study of Law. Beginning as a tenured lecturer, he was subsequently promoted to Reader, and then to a Personal Chair in Penology.

In 1984-85, Garland was a Shelby Cullom Davis Fellow in Princeton University's history department, and a participant, along with Michael B. Katz, Peter Mandler, Judith Herrin, Natalie Zemon Davis, Clifford Geertz, Lawrence Stone and others, in that year’s Davis Center seminar on “Charity and Welfare”.

From June to September 1985, he was a visiting professor at the Law and Society Center at the University of California, Berkeley. He returned to Berkeley in Spring 1988 as a visiting professor in the Jurisprudence and Social Policy program where he taught a graduate seminar on “Punishment and Society.” (The seminar was audited by Jerome Skolnick, later a colleague at NYU, and Jonathan Simon, subsequently a leading law and society scholar.)

While at Princeton in 1984-85, Garland attended a weekly seminar at NYU Law taught by James B Jacobs, with whom he became close friends. At Jacobs’s instigation, NYU Law School appointed Garland as a visiting professor for the academic year,1992–93, and in 1995 and 1996, he returned to NYU for brief periods as a professor in NYU’s newly-established Global Law program, the brainchild of Dean John Sexton.

In 1997, he and his wife, Anne Jowett, together with their children, Kasia J Garland and Amy E J Garland, emigrated to New York City. From 1997 to the present, Garland has been a member of the New York University School of Law faculty, where he holds the Arthur T. Vanderbilt professorship, as well as being a full professor in NYU’s Department of Sociology.

Garland has held many visiting positions, including Visiting Reader, Leuven University, Spring 1984; Visiting Professor, NYU Sociology Department, Spring 1992; Havens Center Fellow, Havens Center, University of Wisconsin at Madison, Dept of Sociology, October 2003; Visiting Professor, Santa Fe University, Argentina Spring 2012; the 2012-13 Douglas McK. Brown Chair in Law at the University of British Columbia; a visiting professor at Ferrara University, Italy; the Shimizu Visiting professor of law at the London School of Economics in Fall 2014; an Astor Lecturer, Oxford University; a Fellowship in NYU's Global Research Initiative program (Spring 2018); a Visiting Fellowship at Sydney University School of Law (Spring 2018) and a visiting professorship of Criminal Law at the University of Zurich in Spring 2024.

== Honors and awards ==
Garland is an elected Fellow of the Royal Society of Edinburgh, the British Academy, the American Academy of Arts and Sciences, and the American Society of Criminology. Among the awards he has received for his scholarship are the Prix Denis Caroll of the International Society of Criminology (1988); the Sellin-Glueck Award (1993), the Michael J. Hindelang Award (2012), and the Edwin H. Sutherland Award (2012) of the American Society of Criminology; and the Mary Douglas Award (2011) and Barrington Moore Award (2011) of the American Sociological Association. In 2006 he was selected for a Guggenheim Fellowship to research American capital punishment.

He has been awarded honorary doctorates by the Free University of Brussels (2009); Oslo University (2017); and the University of Edinburgh (2025).

=== Named Lectures ===
James Moffit Lecture in Ethics, Princeton University Center for Human Values (2025); Kadish Lecture, Berkeley Law (2024); The British Academy Law Lecture (2016); Fiftieth Anniversary Lecture, Centre of Criminology, Oxford University (2016); Tercentenary Lecture, Glasgow University School of Law (2013); The Sutherland Address, American Society of Criminology (2012); Tercentenary Lecture University of Edinburgh Law School (2007); First Annual Roger Hood Lecture, Oxford University (2006); The James A. Moffett Lecture in Ethics, University Center for Human Values, Princeton University (2004); Havens Visiting Scholars Lectures, University of Wisconsin at Madison (2003); The John LL J Edwards Memorial Lecture, University of Toronto (2002); The First Annual Nigel Walker Lecture Cambridge University (1997); The George Lurcy Lecture, Amherst College (1990).

== Work and Research ==
Garland has made major contributions to scholarship in the sociology of punishment and control, as well as to the history of criminological ideas. He was a founding editor of the journal, Punishment and Society; his 1990 book, Punishment and Modern Society is regarded as one of the foundational texts of the punishment-and-society field; and The Culture of Control is one of the most-cited works in contemporary criminology. He has been a member of the editorial board of The Annual Review of Criminology since its inception in 2018.

He is the author of Punishment and Welfare: A History of Penal Strategies (1985); Punishment and Modern Society: A Study in Social Theory (1990); The Culture of Control: Crime and Social Order in Contemporary Society (2001); and Peculiar Institution: America’s Death Penalty in an Age of Abolition (2010), all of which have won awards and been translated into multiple languages. His latest book, Law and Order Leviathan: America’s Extraordinary Regime of Policing and Punishment, was published by Princeton University Press in 2025.

Since 2010, he has also worked on the history and sociology of the welfare state, publishing historical and sociological articles and a book, The Welfare State: A Very Short Introduction (2016).

Teaching

At NYU Law School, Garland teaches upper-level seminars on topics such as America’s Death Penalty; America’s Penal State; The People’s Welfare, Law and Culture, Law and Modern Society; and Criminal Sanctions. In the NYU Sociology department’s doctoral program, he regularly teaches Classical Social Theory and has taught seminars on The Sociology of the Welfare State; The Sociology of Punishment, The work of Michel Foucault, and The work of Norbert Elias. He regularly supervises graduate students in the Law School and the Sociology department. Each year he hosts an informal monthly seminar for law students, discussing topics such as law and political economy; capitalism and its competitors; and law and social theory.

== Selected publications ==
- Law and Order Leviathan: America's Extraordinary Regime of Policing and Punishment Princeton University Press (2025)
- Peculiar Institution: America's Death Penalty in an Age of Abolition, Harvard University Press (2010)
- The Culture of Control: Crime and Social Order in Contemporary Society, University of Chicago Press (2001)
- Mass Imprisonment: Social Causes and Consequences, London, Sage Publications (2001)
- A Reader on Punishment, Oxford University Press (1994) (Co-edited with A. Duff)
- Punishment and Modern Society: A Study in Social Theory, Oxford University Press (1990)
- Punishment and Welfare: A History of Penal Strategies, Gower (1985)
- The Power to Punish, Gower (1983) (Co-edited with Peter Young)
- "Penality and the Penal State" in Criminology (2013) vol 51 No 3 pp 475–51
