= David McDowall (criminologist) =

American criminologist (born 1949)

- Born: 1949 (age 76–77)
- Education: Portland State University, Northwestern University
- Awards: 2005 SUNY Chancellor’s Award for Excellence in Teaching and the University at Albany Excellence in Teaching Award, 2011 Criminology Teaching Award from American Society of Criminology
- Scientific career
- Fields: Criminology
- Workplaces: University at Albany, SUNY, University of Maryland, College Park
- Thesis: Structure and ideology in a university faculty's response to an intramural change (1980)

David McDowall (born 1949) is an American criminologist and distinguished teaching professor in the School of Criminal Justice at the University at Albany, SUNY, where he is also co-director of the Violence Research Group. Educated at Portland State University and Northwestern University, he taught at the University of Maryland, College Park, from 1990 until joining the University at Albany in 1996. He has published a number of studies pertaining to gun violence in the United States.

== Education ==
David McDowall was born in 1949. He received his B.A. from Portland State University in 1973 and his M.A. and Ph.D. from Northwestern University in 1975 and 1980, respectively. All three of his degrees are in sociology. After graduating from Northwestern, he did postdoctoral work at the University of Michigan.

== Career ==
McDowall joined the faculty of the University of Maryland, College Park in 1990 as an associate professor in their Department of Criminology and Criminal Justice, and became a full professor there in 1992. In 1996, he joined the faculty of the University at Albany's School of Criminal Justice, where he was appointed a distinguished teaching professor in 2013. Prior to being appointed a distinguished professor, he had served on over 25 dissertation committees. At the University at Albany, he is also the co-director of the Violence Research Group, along with Colin Loftin.

== Research ==
McDowall is a criminologist whose research focuses on "the social distribution of crime and criminal victimization." He has also researched gun violence and the effects of certain gun laws, such as the Firearms Control Regulations Act of 1975, which, in a 1991 study, he and his co-authors found was followed by "a prompt decline in homicides and suicides by firearms in the District of Columbia". He has also researched the frequency of defensive gun use, and has criticized the research of Gary Kleck with respect to this issue, saying, "Kleck is a really smart guy. That's why his work is as prominent as it is. . . (But) I think he starts with conclusions, then works backward to support them." He has also criticized Kleck's 1995 study estimating 2.5 million DGU incidents per year for including not just situations in which guns were used by crime victims, but also those when people thought the presence of a gun protected them from threats. In 2012, he said that "Given that half of the U.S. households own a gun, armed self-defense is extremely uncommon." In 1995, McDowall and two of his colleagues published a study evaluating the effect of passing more lenient concealed carry laws on homicide rates in three states, and found that these laws did not reduce homicide rates and, in fact, may have even increased them in two of the states studied. The same study found that one of the states that relaxed their concealed carry laws, Oregon, saw a decrease in homicide rates in its largest city, Portland. McDowall told the New York Times that this may have happened because Oregon passed stricter laws regulating the purchase of guns around the time they also relaxed their concealed carry laws, "and that might have overwhelmed the effect of the relaxation."

== Honors and awards ==
In 2005, McDowall received two awards for Excellence in Teaching: one from the State University of New York System's Chancellor, and the other from the President of the University at Albany. In 2009, he was named a fellow of the American Society of Criminology (ASC); in 2011, he received a Criminology Teaching Award from the ASC in recognition of his entire teaching career.

== Editorial activities ==
McDowall was the editor-in-chief of the Journal of Quantitative Criminology from 2001 to 2008. He became the editor-in-chief of Criminology starting in the fall of 2016.
