= Denise Gottfredson =

American criminologist

- Born: Denise Claire Ruff
- Education: Fairleigh Dickinson University; Johns Hopkins University
- Known for: Juvenile delinquency Program evaluation
- Spouse: Gary Gottfredson (m. 1980)
- Scientific career
- Fields: Criminology; Sociology
- Institutions: University of Maryland, College Park
- Thesis: Personality and persistence in education (1980)

Denise Claire Gottfredson (née Denise Claire Ruff) is an American criminologist and professor in the department of criminal justice and criminology at the University of Maryland, College Park.

She is an expert on school violence and juvenile delinquency. She is recognized for her research applying the techniques of program evaluation to certain crime prevention initiatives, such as Drug Abuse Resistance Education, the Strengthening Families Program, and the Baltimore City Drug Treatment Court. She has also researched the effects of school resource officers on schools, finding that such officers spend an average of about half of their time engaged in law enforcement activities. She served as vice president of the American Society of Criminology (ASC) from 2005 to 2006, and as editor-in-chief of its journal, Criminology, from 2005 to 2011. She is a fellow of the ASC and of the Academy of Experimental Criminology.

== Personal Life and Education ==
Gottfredson (née Ruff) married psychologist Gary Gottfredson in 1980. She earned her B.A.in psychology from Fairleigh Dickinson University in 1974 and her Ph.D. in social relations from Johns Hopkins University in 1980, with a specialization in the Sociology of Education.

== Academic career ==
She became an assistant professor in the Department of Criminal Justice and Criminology at the University of Maryland, College Park, in 1986, and was promoted to full professor in 1995.

=== Awards ===
Gottfredson has been awarded many prestigious awards throughout her career. In May 2005, she received the Society for Prevention Research Prevention Science Award. She received the University of Maryland Outstanding Woman of the Year Award in 2007. In 2009, she received the Academy of Experimental Criminology Joan McCord Award. She received the Division of Experimental Criminology, American Society of Criminology Jerry Lee Lifetime Achievement Award in 2015. The following year, she received the American Society of Criminology August Vollmer Award in 2016.

== Research ==
Gottfredson has over 120 publications and over 10,000 citations, with a research focus primarily on the role of schools in juvenile delinquency. This includes school-based prevention strategies, crime in schools, victimization in schools, and the school-to-prison pipeline. Gottfredson also worked with fellow criminologist Terrence Thornberry, on the Blueprints for Gang Prevention project, which was sponsored by the Office of Juvenile Justice and Delinquency Prevention. This project explored Functional Family Therapy as an intervention strategy for youth gang involvement.

=== School-Based Prevention ===
In 2001, Gottfredson and colleagues compiled results from 165 prior studies on preventing and addressing problem behaviors within the school system. This meta-analysis found that many prevention strategies lack sufficient research, but can be useful in addressing truancy, substance use, and withdrawing from school. Additionally, the study supported methods that identify and target students in high risk populations.

As a member of the Society for Prevention Research, Gottfredson aided in publishing a reformed set of standards.

Gottfredson has also researched the effects of after school programs on delinquency, finding success in these programs through improvements in social skills and reduced substance use.

=== Crime and Victimization in Schools ===
Gottfredson and her husband, Gary Gottfredson, co-authored Victimization in Schools, which investigated teacher and student victimization. This book reviewed factors that increase and decrease victimization rates and the concept of school disorder.

=== School-to-Prison Pipeline ===
A major topic in Gottfredson's recent research is the relationship between school resource officers (SROs) and the school-to-prison pipeline. Gottfredson and Deanna N. Devlin collaborated to investigate the dangers of increasing rates of SROs, such as leading to more severe disciplinary actions that can negatively impact student outcomes. Gottfredson's research has also found evidence of a positive correlation between the number of SROs and reported criminal offenses involving drugs and weapons.

== Books ==
- Victimization in Schools (1985)
- Closing Institutions for Juvenile Offenders: The Maryland Experience (1997)
- Schools and Delinquency (2001)
