= Alan Lizotte =

American criminologist

- Born: United States
- Education: Brown University; University of Illinois Urbana-Champaign
- Awards: 2003 Michael J. Hindelang Award
- Scientific career
- Fields: Criminology
- Workplaces: University at Albany
- Thesis: Patterns of Firearms Ownership in Illinois (1979)

Alan Jeffrey Lizotte was an American criminologist and Distinguished Professor in the School of Criminal Justice at the University at Albany.

== Early life and education ==
Lizotte grew up in Grand Junction, Colorado, where he later recalled almost everyone he knew owning a gun. He served in the United States Navy from July 1966 to January 1970. His service included one tour on the USS Jouett in the Vietnam War, and one-and-a-half tours in the Inshore Undersea Warfare Group One, Unit 2, on land; he attained the rank of Second Class Petty Officer as a radioman before being discharged. He later received his bachelor's degree in sociology from Brown University in 1974, followed by a M.A. (1976) and Ph.D. (1979) from the University of Illinois Urbana-Champaign, also in sociology. As a grad student at the University of Illinois, he shared an office with Gary Kleck.

== Career ==
Lizotte was an assistant professor of sociology at Emory University from 1978 to 1980. He first joined the faculty of the University at Albany's School of Criminal Justice in 1985 as an associate professor, and was named a full professor there in 1993. In 2016, he became a Distinguished Professor at the School. He served as the director of the School's Hindelang Criminal Justice Research Center from 1994 to 1997, and then again from 2003 to 2010, when he was named the School's dean; he retained the latter position until 2015. From 2004 to 2007, he was an executive counselor for the American Society of Criminology.

== Honors and awards ==
In 2003, Lizotte received the Michael J. Hindelang Award from the American Society of Criminology, and in 2014, he was named one of its fellows.
