= John Kramer =

John Kramer may refer to:

- John Kramer (darts player) (born 1956), retired American professional darts player
- John Kramer, better known as Jigsaw, fictional character in the Saw franchise
- John Kramer, bassist with the Arthur Lyman Group
- Jack Kramer (John Albert Kramer, 1921–2009), American tennis player
- John R. Kramer (1937–2006), former Tulane University Law School dean
- John H. Kramer, emeritus professor at Pennsylvania State University
- John Krämer, German writer
- John Kramer (footballer)

== See also ==
- John Cramer (disambiguation)
