= Jonathan Simon =

American legal scholar (born 1958/59)

- Born: 1958 or 1959 (age 66–67)
- Occupation: Law professor
- Parent: William Simon (sociologist)
- Relatives: Adam Simon, brother

Academic background
- Education: University of California, Berkeley (B.A., 1981; J.D., 1987; Ph.D., 1990)
- Thesis: From discipline to management: Strategies of control in parole supervision, 1890-1990 (1990)

Academic work
- Discipline: Criminal law
- Sub-discipline: Incarceration and punishment
- Institutions: UC Berkeley School of Law; University of Miami School of Law; University of Michigan Law School

Jonathan Simon (born 1958 or 1959) is an American academic, the Lance Robbins Professor of Criminal Justice Law, and the former Associate Dean of the Jurisprudence and Social Policy Program at the UC Berkeley School of Law. Simon’s scholarship concerns the role of crime and criminal justice in governing contemporary societies, risk and the law, and the history of the interdisciplinary study of law. His other interests include criminology; penology; sociology; insurance models of governing risk; governance; the origins and consequences of, and solutions to, the California prison "crisis"; parole; prisons; capital punishment; immigration detention; and the warehousing of incarcerated people.

== Early life and education ==
Jonathan Simon is the son of sociologist William Simon. As a young boy growing up in Chicago, Simon was impacted by the politics of the 1960s, including anti-war protests and the assassination of Fred Hampton. Simon attended the University of Chicago Laboratory High School, graduating in 1977. He received a bachelor's degree in Social Science at University of California, Berkeley in 1981, going on to complete a J.D. (1987) and Ph.D. in Jurisprudence & Social Policy (1990) also at Berkeley. During his graduate studies, he clerked for Judge William Canby.

Simon cites his academic interest in crime and punishment as stemming from his own experience being arrested for civil disobedience in 1981, and witnessing the demographics and treatment of the prisoners in jail in Alameda County, California.

== Career ==
As a young lawyer, Simon taught at the University of Michigan and at the University of Miami. With Malcom Feeley, Simon published a theory of "new penology" in 1992 that placed early attention on what is sometimes called, "actuarial justice" or "risk assessment," which is primarily concerned with the correct identification, classification, and management of groups categorized according to perceived dangerousness and the logic of efficient administration. In 1993, while teaching in Miami, he published his first monograph, Poor Discipline: Parole and the Social Control of the Underclass, which studies parole in California and its relationship to larger cycles of imprisonment nationwide.

Simon began teaching at the University of California, Berkeley in 2003. He published his second monograph, Governing through Crime: How the War on Crime Transformed American Democracy and Created a Culture of Fear, in 2007, analyzing how problems like poverty and educational inequality became criminalized in the shadow of the New Deal. The book was praised as "the most important and most readable treatment to date on the overreach of crime;" it received the Michael J. Hindelang Award from the American Society of Criminology, a Distinguished Book Award from the American Sociological Association, and was named a Choice Outstanding Academic Title.

Simon served as the co-editor-in-chief of the journal Punishment & Society from 2004 to 2008. In 2013, he was the co-editor of the Sage Handbook of Punishment & Society.

Since 2013, Simon has directed Berkeley's interdisciplinary Center for the Study of Law and Society. In the role, Simon emphasizes the importance of "human rights, behavioral psychology, and the humanities" in modern legal issues. In 2014 Simon published his most recent monograph, Mass Incarceration on Trial: A Remarkable Court Decision and the Future of Prisons in America, in which he "examines the 2011 U.S. Supreme Court case Brown v. Plata as a lens into the country’s larger dependence on mass incarceration as a crime control policy" and explores the causes and consequences of prison overcrowding amid falling crime rates in the 1980s.

As of 2022, Simon has published over 90 academic articles on subjects including crime, punishment, incarceration, eugenics, violence, the death penalty, and more. He is a member of professional societies including the Law and Society Association and the American Society of Criminology. He often contributes to news platforms and magazines such as the San Francisco Chronicle, the New York Times, the Atlantic, NPR, and more.

== Awards and recognition ==
In 2008, Simon was a J. C. Smith Trust Fund Visiting Scholar at the University of Nottingham. In 2010, Simon was a visiting professor with the Leverhulme Trust at the University of Edinburgh. He was named a Fellow of the Israel Institute for Advanced Studies for the 2015-2016 academic year. In 2016, Simon was awarded an honorary doctorate by the Belgian Université catholique de Louvain's Department of Law and Criminology, for his "powerful critique of repressive American politics" that addresses not only crime and criminal justice but also fear, punishment, and power. In 2018, Simon was a Fellow of the Japan Society for the Promotion of Science.

== Selected publications ==
=== Books ===
- Poor Discipline. University of Chicago Press, 1993.
- Governing through Crime: How the War on Crime Transformed American Democracy and Created a Culture of Fear. Oxford University Press, 2007.
- Mass Incarceration on Trial: A Remarkable Court Decision and the Future of Prisons in America. The New Press, 2014.

=== Articles ===
- Feeley, Malcolm M., and Jonathan Simon. "The new penology: Notes on the emerging strategy of corrections and its implications." Criminology 30.4 (1992): 449-474.
- "Managing the monstrous: Sex offenders and the new penology." Psychology, Public Policy, and Law 4, no. 1-2 (1998): 452.
- "Refugees in a carceral age: The rebirth of immigration prisons in the United States." Public Culture 10, no. 3 (1998): 577-607.
- "Law after society." Law & Social Inquiry 24, no. 1 (1999): 143-194.
- "Paramilitary features of contemporary penality." Journal of Political & Military Sociology (1999): 279-290.
- "Megan's law: Crime and democracy in late modern America." Law & Social Inquiry 25, no. 4 (2000): 1111-1150.
- "From the big house to the warehouse: rethinking prisons and state government in the 20th century." Punishment & Society 2, no. 2 (2000): 213-234.
- "Fear and loathing in late modernity: Reflections on the cultural sources of mass imprisonment in the United States." Punishment & Society 3, no. 1 (2001): 21-33.
- "Fearless Speech in the Killing State: The Power of Capital Crime Victim Speech." NCL Rev. 82 (2003): 1377.
- "Reversal of fortune: The resurgence of individual risk assessment in criminal justice." Annu. Rev. Law Soc. Sci. 1 (2005): 397-421.
- "Wake of the flood: Crime, disaster, and the American risk imaginary after Katrina." Issues in Legal Scholarship 6, no. 3 (2007).
- "Rise of the carceral state." Social Research: An International Quarterly 74, no. 2 (2007): 471-508.
- "Consuming obsessions: Housing, homicide, and mass incarceration since 1950." U. Chi. Legal F. (2010): 165.
- "Mass incarceration: From social policy to social problem." The Oxford handbook of sentencing and corrections (2012): 23-52.
- "Misdemeanor injustice and the crisis of mass incarceration." S. Cal. L. Rev. Postscript 85 (2012): 113.
- "The return of the medical model: Disease and the meaning of imprisonment from John Howard to Brown v. Plata." Harv. CR-CLL Rev. 48 (2013): 217.
- A Radical Need for Criminology, 40 Soc. Just. 9 (2014).
- "Law's Violence, the Strong State, and the Crisis of Mass Imprisonment (for Stuart Hall)." Wake Forest L. Rev. 49 (2014): 649.
- "The new gaol: seeing incarceration like a city." The ANNALS of the American Academy of Political and Social Science 664, no. 1 (2016): 280-301.
- "Racing Abnormality, Normalizing Race: The Origins of America's Peculiar Carceral State and Its Prospects for Democratic Transformation Today." Nw. UL Rev. 111 (2016): 1625.
- Foucault, Michel, Jonathan Simon, and Stuart Elden. "Danger, crime and rights: a conversation between Michel Foucault and Jonathan Simon." Theory, Culture & Society 34, no. 1 (2017): 3-27.
- "Penal monitoring in the United States: lessons from the American experience and prospects for change." Crime, Law and Social Change 70, no. 1 (2018): 161-173.
- "Explicit Bias: Why Criminal Justice Reform Requires Us to Challenge Crime Control Strategies That Are Anything But Race Blind." (2018): 331.
- "For a human rights approach to reforming the American penal state." Journal of Human Rights Practice 11, no. 2 (2019): 346-356.
- "'The Criminal Is to Go Free': The Legacy of Eugenic Thought in Contemporary Judicial Realism about American Criminal Justice." BUL Rev. 100 (2020): 787.
- "Dignity and its discontents: Towards an abolitionist rethinking of dignity." European Journal of Criminology 18, no. 1 (2021): 33-51.
