= Forrest Stuart =

American sociologist

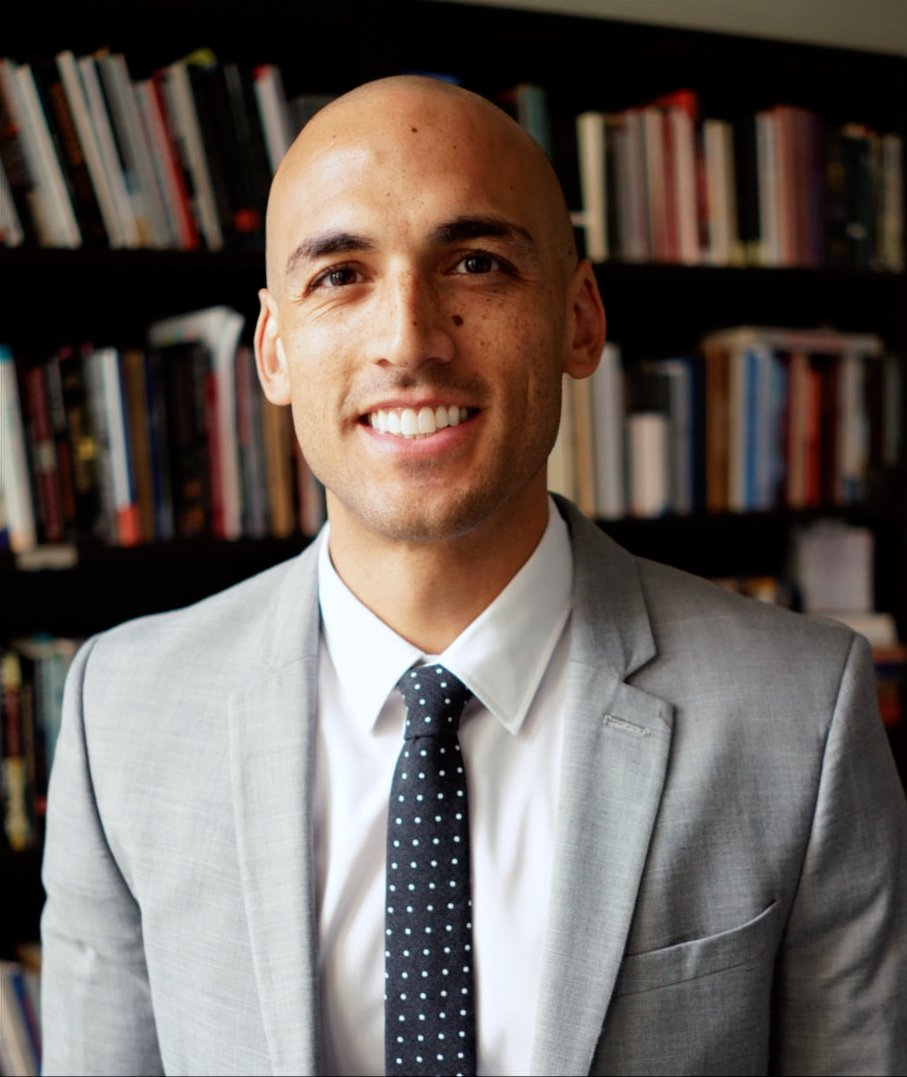
- Stuart in 2019.
- Born: Forrest Daniel Stuart (Note: His birth name is mentioned in his doctoral thesis.)
- Occupations: Sociologist, author, academic
- Title: Professor of Sociology, Director of the Stanford Ethnography Lab, Faculty Director of the Program on Urban Studies
- Awards: MacArthur Fellowship (2020), the Michael J. Hindelang Award (2019), the Gordon J. Laing Book Prize (2018), the Robert E. Park Award (2017), the American Sociological Association Communication, Information Technology, and Media Sociology (CITAMS) Section Best Book Award (2021), the American Sociological Association Children & Youth Section Outstanding Scholarly Contribution Award (2022), (Note: For his book Ballad of the Bullet: Gangs, Drill Music, and the Power of Online Infamy.)

Academic background
- Education: B.A. in Politics (2004), M.S. in Justice, Law & Society (2006), M.A. in Sociology (2008), Ph.D. in Sociology (2012)
- Alma mater: University of California, Los Angeles
- Thesis: Policing Rock Bottom: Regulation, Rehabilitation, and Resistance on Skid Row (2012)
- Doctoral advisor: Stefan Timmermans

Academic work
- Discipline: Sociology
- Sub-discipline: Urban sociology, ethnography, policing, gangs
- Institutions: Stanford University
- Main interests: Urban poverty, its societal underpinnings and criminalization, urban marginality, policing, gang culture, social media in crime, and the effects of mass incarceration
- Website: forreststuart.net

Forrest Daniel Stuart is an American sociologist, author, and academic. Stuart is Professor of Sociology at Stanford University, and the Director of the Stanford Ethnography Lab and serves as Faculty Director for Stanford’s Program on Urban Studies. He is known for his work in urban sociology, crime, deviance, law, and ethnographic methods. Stuart was awarded a MacArthur Fellowship in 2020. He won the Michael J. Hindelang Award in 2019

== Early life and education ==
Growing up in San Bernardino during the 1980s and 1990s, one of the most impoverished cities in the United States at the time, Stuart said that his environment significantly shaped his academic interests later on. He credited courses in political theory at the University of California, Santa Cruz with helping him connect local issues of violence and poverty to broader social and policy decisions. Stuart earned a B.A. in Politics from the University of California, Santa Cruz (2004), then an M.S. in Justice, Law & Society from American University (2006) and an M.A. in Sociology from the University of California, Los Angeles (2008). He pursued his doctoral studies in Sociology under the supervision of Stefan Timmermans at the University of California, Los Angeles, and received his PhD in 2012. His thesis was titled Policing Rock Bottom: Regulation, Rehabilitation, and Resistance on Skid Row.

== Career ==
From 2012 to 2018, Stuart served as Assistant Professor of Sociology at the University of Chicago. Then, he was appointed as Associate Professor of Sociology in 2018 and served until 2019. Stuart joined Stanford University in 2019 as Associate Professor of Sociology and became a Professor of Sociology in 2022.

At Stanford, Stuart is the Director of the Stanford Ethnography Lab, Faculty Director of the Program on Urban Studies, and an affiliate of the American Studies Program, the Center for Comparative Studies in Race and Ethnicity, and the Center for Global Ethnography.

In 2018, Stuart received the Gordon J. Laing Prize for his 2016 book ''Down, Out, and Under Arrest: Policing and Everyday Life in Skid Row.'' The work, based on extensive ethnographic fieldwork, studies how policing and reduced social support affect low-income residents in Los Angeles’s Skid Row.

In a 2018 interview to The Chicago Maroon, Stuart discussed how his fieldwork in Los Angeles's Skid Row informed his book "Down, Out, and Under Arrest" and described how limited social services and constant police surveillance negatively affect residents striving to improve their lives. He observed that police officers, often lacking adequate support systems, turn to punitive measures in the name of rehabilitation, creating a paradoxical fusion of punishment and aid. Stuart also reflected on being awarded the 2018 Gordon J. Laing Prize, noting the inspiration he drew from the University of Chicago’s storied tradition of ethnographic research, and emphasized his commitment to reinvigorating that legacy by combining classic on-the-ground methods with new analytical approaches.

=== Ballad of the Bullet ===
His book Ballad of the Bullet: Gangs, Drill Music, and the Power of Online Infamy, published in 2020, studied how young, marginalized men in Chicago's South Side engaged with social media to craft images of hyperviolent gang life. Stuart focused on their motivations for producing "drill music" videos, the commodification of urban poverty, and the pursuit of fame through online notoriety. The book covered the risks and rewards these men experienced as they attempted to leverage the internet's attention economy for upward mobility and personal validation. Reviewers applauded its detailed fieldwork on the "digital street" and commended its insights into how online content sometimes de-escalated conflicts, even as it also intensified threats and surveillance. The book received the CITAMS Book Award, an Honorable Mention for the Outstanding Book Award, (Note: In the Inequality, Poverty and Mobility Section of the American Sociological Association.) and was a finalist for the PROSE Award in Cultural Anthropology & Sociology.

=== MacArthur fellow ===
In 2020, Stuart was awarded a MacArthur Fellowship from the John D. and Catherine T. MacArthur Foundation, a recognition often referred to as a "genius grant." The honor, which includes a $625,000 award, acknowledged his innovative research methods and potential for making significant contributions in his field. The fellowship supported his continued work examining community-based approaches to social inequality and urban violence, with an emphasis on immersive, humanistic inquiry and collaboration with those most affected by the issues he studies.

=== Research and contributions ===
In interviews, Stuart has emphasized that even minor police encounters can have extensive ripple effects within marginalized communities, influencing daily behavior and family relationships. He studies these impacts through ethnographic methods, arguing that "scars of police contact" endure long after an officer departs, shaping how residents navigate their neighborhoods and interact with others.

== Awards and honors ==
- MacArthur Fellowship (2020)
- American Sociological Association Communication, Information Technology, and Media Sociology Section Best Book Award (2021)
- American Society of Criminology Michael J. Hindelang Award (2019) (Note: For his 2016 book Down, Out, and Under Arrest: Policing and Everyday Life in Skid Row, the University of Chicago Press.)
- American Sociological Association Robert E. Park Award (2017)
- Gordon J. Laing Book Prize (2018)

== Selected publications ==
=== Books ===
- Down, Out, and Under Arrest: Policing and Everyday Life in Skid Row (2016)
- Ballad of the Bullet: Gangs, Drill Music, and the Power of Online Infamy (2020)

=== Articles ===
- Stuart, Forrest. "Code of the tweet: Urban gang violence in the social media age." Social Problems 67, no. 2 (2020): 191-207.
- White, Kailey, Forrest Stuart, and Shannon L. Morrissey. "Whose lives matter? Race, space, and the devaluation of homicide victims in minority communities." Sociology of Race and Ethnicity 7, no. 3 (2021): 333-349.
- Herbert, Steve, Katherine Beckett, and Forrest Stuart. "Policing social marginality: Contrasting approaches." Law & Social Inquiry 43, no. 4 (2018): 1491-1513.
- Miller, Reuben Jonathan, and Forrest Stuart. "Carceral citizenship: Race, rights and responsibility in the age of mass supervision." Theoretical Criminology 21, no. 4 (2017): 532-548.
- Stuart, Forrest. "Becoming “copwise”: Policing, culture, and the collateral consequences of street-level criminalization." Law & society review 50, no. 2 (2016): 279-313.
- Stuart, Forrest, Amada Armenta, and Melissa Osborne. "Legal control of marginal groups." Annual Review of Law and Social Science 11, no. 1 (2015): 235-254.
- Stuart, Forrest. "From’Rabble Management’to’Recovery Management’: Policing Homelessness in Marginal Urban Space." Urban Studies 51, no. 9 (2014): 1909-1925.
- Stuart, Forrest. "Constructing police abuse after Rodney King: How skid row residents and the Los Angeles Police Department contest video evidence." Law & Social Inquiry 36, no. 2 (2011): 327-353.
