= William Chambliss =

American criminologist, sociologist (1933–2014)

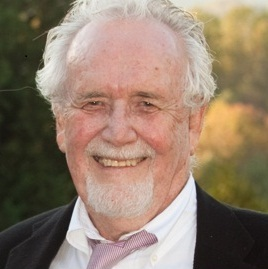
- William J. Chambliss
- Born: William Joseph Chambliss; 1933; Buffalo, New York
- Died: February 22, 2014 (age 80); Washington, D.C.
- Education: University of California, Los Angeles (B.A., 1955), Indiana University (Ph.D., 1962)
- Spouse(s): Louisa Mackie (divorced), Pernille Baadsager Chambliss (married until his death)
- Children: 3
- Awards: Lifetime Achievement Awards from the Criminology section and the Sociology of Law section of the American Sociological Association
- Scientific career
- Fields: Criminology, sociology
- Institutions: George Washington University
- Thesis: The selection of friends (1962)

William Joseph Chambliss (1933 – February 22, 2014) was an American criminologist and sociologist. He was a professor of Sociology and Criminal Justice at The George Washington University for over 20 years. He was a pioneer of the conflict theory (social theory) which concluded, among other things, that conflict between different social classes is the fundamental force in capitalist societies. In addition to his transformative scholarly contributions, he was a teacher-scholar and mentor to many of today’s leading criminologists and sociologists.

== Early life and education ==
William Chambliss was born in 1933 in Buffalo, New York. He received his B.A. from the University of California, Los Angeles in 1955 and his Ph.D. from the Indiana University in 1962, both in sociology. As a young man, he also served in the Counterintelligence Corps during the Korean War.

== Career ==
Chambliss' first academic position was at the University of Washington, where he joined the faculty just after receiving his Ph.D. In 1967, he followed Donald Cressey, one of his early mentors, to the University of California, Santa Barbara. He later taught at the University of Delaware for a decade before joining George Washington University in 1986.

== Personal life and death ==
Chambliss was married to Pernille Chambliss with whom he had three children: Jeffrey, Lauren, and James. Pernille said William had "the nicest heart." He died of cancer on February 22, 2014.

== Honors and awards ==
Chambliss received two Lifetime Achievement Awards from the American Sociological Association: one from its Criminology section and the other from its Sociology of Law section. He also served as the president of the American Criminological Society and the Society for the Study of Social Problems. In 2012, the Society for the Study of Social Problems created the William J. Chambliss Lifetime Achievement Award to "recognize career-spanning excellence and achievement in the area of law and society."

Professional and academic associations
Preceded by Don Gottfredson	President of the American Society of Criminology; 1988	Succeeded by Joan McCord
