= Nikki Jones =

American sociologist

- Born: May 29, 1975 (age 51)

Academic background
- Education: PhD, Sociology and Criminology, 2004, University of Pennsylvania
- Thesis: Girls fight: negotiating conflict and violence in distressed inner-city neighborhoods (2004)

Academic work
- Institutions: University of California, Berkeley; University of California, Santa Barbara
- Website: socprofjones.com

Nikki Jeanette Jones (born May 29, 1975) is an American sociologist. She is an associate professor of African American Studies at the University of California, Berkeley.

== Early life and education ==
Jones was born on May 29, 1975. She earned her master's degree and PhD in Sociology and Criminology from the University of Pennsylvania, becoming the first person to earn a PhD in criminology from any top ten research university in the United States.

== Career ==
Upon earning her PhD, Jones accepted an assistant professor position in the Department of Sociology at the University of California, Santa Barbara for the 2004–05 academic year. In this role, she earned a William T. Grant Award for Early Career Scholars to fund her research project titled Pathways to Freedom: How Young People Create a Life After Incarceration. A few years later, Jones published her first book titled Between Good and Ghetto: African American Girls and Inner City Violence, which won the New Scholar Award from the American Society of Criminology. The book was an ethnographic study of violence within the inner-city of Philadelphia amongst adolescent girls. She focused on how the girls oscillate between protecting themselves against daily threats of physical violence and conforming to White middle-class gender norms.

The following year, Jones published her second book, which was edited by criminologist Meda Chesney-Lind, titled Fighting for Girls: New Perspectives on Gender and Violence. Similar to her first book, Jones focused on adolescent girls and the moral panic caused by media representations surrounding them as becoming increasingly violent. Her research claimed that a spike in arrest numbers for adolescent girls was the cause of this panic, not an actual increase in violence. She placed the blame of the increase on zero-tolerance policies in schools and mandatory arrest policies. As a result of her research, Jones was appointed Chair of the American Sociological Association's Race, Gender and Class Section from 2012 until 2013. During this time, she also co-led a research project with Geoff Raymond called Identifying Good Strangers: A Micro-Interactional Approach, funded by a $592,699 three-year grant.

Jones left the University of California, Santa Barbara in 2013 to join the department of African American Studies at the University of California, Berkeley. Following the Killing of Philando Castile, Jones collaborated with Raymond on a three-year project to help police develop better communication methods. She also established the Justice Interaction Lab during the rise of the Black Lives Matter movement with funding from the William T. Grant Foundation. Her third book, The Chosen Ones: Black Men and the Politics of Redemption, reflected on her recent research and focused on the victimization of young Black men by urban gun violence. It went on to receive on the Choice Reviews Outstanding Academic Title for 2018 and the Michael J. Hindelang Award from the American Society of Criminology. In 2020, Jones received the W.E.B. DuBois Award from the Western Society of Criminology for her work in raising awareness for racial and ethical issues in criminology and criminal justice.

== Selected publication ==
The following is a list of selected publications:

- Between Good and Ghetto: African American Girls and Inner City Violence (2009)
- Fighting for Girls: New Perspectives on Gender and Violence (2010)
- The Chosen Ones: Black Men and the Politics of Redemption (2018)
