= Pridemore =

Surname

Pridemore is a surname. Notable people with the surname include:

- Auburn Pridemore (1837–1900), nineteenth century politician and lawyer from Virginia
- Brook Pridemore (born 1979), American singer-songwriter affiliated with the Antifolk scene in New York City
- Craig Pridemore, Democratic Washington State Senator, representing the 49th district since 2005
- Don Pridemore (born 1946), Wisconsin politician
- J. S. Pridemore (born 1871), wealthy oil industrialist and member of the West Virginia House of Delegates
- Tom Pridemore, former safety from West Virginia and a legislator
- William Pridemore (born 1969), American criminologist
