= Point Blank: Guns and Violence in America =

1991 book by Gary Kleck

- Author: Gary Kleck
- Language: English
- Subject: Gun violence in the United States
- Genre: Nonfiction
- Publisher: Aldine de Gruyter
- Publication date: 1991
- Pages: 512
- Awards: 1993 Michael J. Hindelang Award from the American Society of Criminology

Point Blank: Guns and Violence in America is a book about gun violence in the United States by Florida State University criminologist Gary Kleck. The book was published by Aldine de Gruyter in 1991, and received the 1993 Michael J. Hindelang Award from the American Society of Criminology.

== Reception ==
Philip J. Cook reviewed the book for the New England Journal of Medicine, writing that the book "is valuable for its thorough, well-organized treatment of an important body of literature and data; the 'full range of pertinent ideas and evidence relevant to this issue' is indeed here, or nearly so. But Professor Kleck's weighing of the evidence is perhaps not as evenhanded as he would have us believe."

In another mixed review, Joseph Sheley described the book as "at once refreshing and bothersome".

H. Laurence Ross wrote in the American Journal of Sociology that "Kleck does the gun control policy debate a great service in demonstrating the complexity of issues that too often are discussed in simplistic ways in the political arena."

In 1995, Richard Alba and Steven Messner critiqued the book in a paper published in the Journal of Quantitative Criminology, in which they claimed to "reveal significant flaws in [Kleck's] original data analyses and identify problematic linkages between his evidence and his inferences".
