= Jeffery Ulmer =

- Born: Jeffrey Todd Ulmer; March 2, 1966 (age 60)
- Education: Pennsylvania State University
- Awards: American Society of Criminology's 2021 Fellow Award, 2012 Corrections and Sentencing Distinguished Scholar Award, 2001 Corrections and Sentencing Distinguished New Scholar Award
- Scientific career
- Fields: Sociology, criminology
- Workplaces: Pennsylvania State University
- Thesis: Trial court communities under sentencing guidelines: Sentencing, case processing, and organizational relations (1993)
- Doctoral advisor: John H. Kramer

Jeffery Todd Ulmer (born March 2, 1966) is Distinguished Professor of sociology and criminology at Pennsylvania State University (Penn State). He served as the associate head of the Department of Sociology and Criminology from 2013 to 2019 and is currently Director of the Penn State Criminal Justice Research Center.

== Education ==
Ulmer received his B.A. from Susquehanna University in 1988, and his M.A. and Ph.D. from Penn State in 1990 and 1993, respectively, all in sociology. He graduated from Springdale High School in Springdale, AR, in 1984.

== Career ==
From 1994 to 2000, Jeffery Ulmer served on the sociology faculty of Purdue University, first as Assistant professor and later as Associate professor of sociology. In 2000, he joined the faculty of Penn State, first as Associate Professor, where he was later promoted to the rank of full Professor. In 2025, he was named Distinguished Professor of Sociology and Criminology.

Perhaps Ulmer's best known and most influential research has focused on criminal court prosecution and sentencing. In the late 1990s, Darrell J. Steffensmeier, Ulmer, and John H. Kramer developed the “focal concerns” theoretical model of sentencing and criminal justice decision making, which describes criminal punishment decisions as driven by prosecutors' and judges' interpretations of defendants' "blameworthiness," assessments of defendants' "dangerousness" to the community, and perceptions of "practical constraints" surrounding criminal cases. This focal concerns perspective has become a major conceptual framework used in sentencing research, and has recently been used in a variety of studies to examine other criminal justice decision making sites as well, such as charging and plea bargaining, probation revocation, and parole decisions. More recently, Ulmer along with colleagues have argued for a fourth focal concern of sentencing and justice decision-making, the perceived "rehabilitative potential" of defendants.

In addition, Ulmer's research has been instrumental in studying how court prosecution and sentencing are influenced by courts' social and organizational contexts. Ulmer has advocated for the "court communities" theoretical perspective on criminal court organization, which depicts courts through the metaphor of communities, with their own distinctive organizational culture, norms, organizational relationships, and local influences. Ulmer's research typically combines the focal concerns perspective with the court communities view in order to study how court contexts shape judges' and prosecutors' sentencing and plea bargaining. A subtheme of Ulmer's work has been to study how U.S. state or federal sentencing policies, such as sentencing guidelines or mandatory minimums, are adapted (and circumvented) by local court prosecutors, judges, and defense attorneys. Ulmer's research often mixes quantitative and qualitative data, and draws on organizational theory in sociology.

Jeffery Ulmer has also done several studies of death penalty decision-making and disparities therein. He and colleagues have studied the effects of capital defendants' race, and murder victims' race and gender, on death penalty decisions in Pennsylvania in the 2000s and 2010s. These studies focus on decisions such as prosecutors' choices to seek the death penalty in eligible cases, whether prosecutors retract those death filings (for example, as part of plea bargains), and judges' or juries' decisions to impose the death penalty. This research generally shows that death sentences were more likely in cases with murder victims who were white, and to a lesser extent, in cases where the murder victims were white males with children.

One of the biggest themes in Ulmer's research on death penalty decision making is to explain what U.S. Supreme Court Justice Stephen Breyer called “geographic arbitrariness” in the death penalty. Justice Breyer, in Jordan v. Mississippi and Evans v. Mississippi (585 US 2018) stated: “Geography also plays an important role in determining who is sentenced to death… And that is not simply because some States permit the death penalty while others do not. Rather within a death penalty State, the imposition of the death penalty heavily depends on the county in which a defendant is tried.” Ulmer and colleagues' research showed great variation across county courts in prosecutors’ willingness to seek the death penalty in eligible cases. County prosecutors’ offices also varied in their willingness to reduce death-eligible charges to second- or third-degree murder through plea bargaining. Furthermore, local prosecutors react quite differently to the factual presence of specific statutory aggravators. This research implies that geographic arbitrariness in the death penalty is in large part endemic to the U.S. death penalty decision making system itself, driven by differences in local prosecutors' decisions and interpretations of cases and law.

Another topic of Jeffery Ulmer's research in criminology focuses on religion and crime. Some of this research integrates the religion-crime relationship with major criminological theories such as differential association/social learning, social and self-control. Other research examines the role of local religious contexts on crime rates and criminal punishment. Some of Ulmer's research has examined the role of local religious contexts in criminal sentencing, religion as a predictor of self control and delinquency, and religion and desistence from marijuana use. Other research has focused on the interrelationship between concentrated structural disadvantage (locally concentrated poverty, unemployment, low education, and family disruption), religious contexts and violence rates. For example, studies by Ulmer and Casey T. Harris found that traditionally African American Protestant denominations' local church presence has a uniquely protective effect on violent crime. The local prevalence of such churches blunts the violent crime-producing effects of concentrated structural disadvantage on both overall violent crime and black violent crime. Overall, this research has helped to create conceptual space for cultural explanations of violence (including religion) alongside and in tandem with structural explanations.

== Honors and awards ==
Jeffery Ulmer has been awarded funding for his research from the National Science Foundation, National Institute of Justice, the Pennsylvania Commission on Sentencing, The Pennsylvania Interbranch Commission on Gender, Racial, and Ethnic Fairness, the Falk Foundation, and other organizations.

Jeffery Ulmer was named a Fellow of the American Society of Criminology in 2021; https://asc41.com/about-asc/awards/#toggle-id-17-closed

Ulmer has received two awards from the American Society of Criminology's Division on Corrections and Sentencing: the 2001 Distinguished New Scholar Award, and the 2012 Distinguished Scholar Award.

In addition, he and coauthor Darrell Steffensmeier, Casey Harris, and Ben Feldmeyer won the American Society of Criminology’s 2012 Outstanding Article Award. He and Darrell Steffensmeier were also awarded the ASC's 2006 Hindelang book award for Confessions of a Dying Thief: Understanding Criminal Careers and Illegal Enterprise (2005, Transaction).

[2]
