= Rutgers University–Newark =

Regional campus in Newark, New Jersey, US

Coordinates: 40.741°N 74.174°W

- Former names: New Jersey Law School (1908–1936); Seth Boyden School of Business (1929–1936); Dana College (1927–1936); Newark Institute of Arts and Sciences (1909–1936); Mercer Beasley School of Law (1926–1936); University of Newark (1936–1946)
- Motto: Sol iustitiae et occidentem illustra
- Motto in English: Sun of righteousness, shine upon the West also.
- Type: Public research university
- Established: 1909; 117 years ago (predecessor); 1946; 80 years ago (Rutgers system)
- Academic affiliations: Space-grant
- Endowment: $1.22 billion (2016, system-wide)
- Chancellor: Tonya Smith-Jackson
- President: William F. Tate IV
- Academic staff: 585
- Administrative staff: 819
- Students: 12,321
- Undergraduates: 8,170
- Postgraduates: 4,151
- Location: Newark, New Jersey, U.S.
- Campus: Urban
- Colors: Scarlet
- Nickname: Scarlet Raiders
- Sporting affiliations: NCAA Division III; New Jersey Athletic Conference
- Mascot: Scarlett Raider the Fox
- Website: newark.rutgers.edu
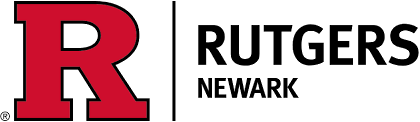

Rutgers University–Newark is one of three regional campuses of Rutgers University, a public land-grant research university consisting of four campuses in New Jersey. It is located in Newark. Rutgers, founded in 1766 in New Brunswick, is the eighth oldest college in the United States and a member of the Association of American Universities. In 1945, the state legislature voted to make Rutgers University, then a private liberal arts college, into the state university and the following year merged the school with the former University of Newark (1936–1946), which became the Rutgers–Newark campus. Rutgers also incorporated the College of South Jersey and South Jersey Law School, in Camden, as a constituent campus of the university and renamed it Rutgers–Camden in 1950.

Rutgers–Newark offers undergraduate (bachelors) and graduate (masters, doctoral) programs to more than 12,000 students. It is classified among "R2: Doctoral Universities – High research activity". It also offers cross-registration with the New Jersey Institute of Technology (NJIT) which borders its campus. The campus is located on 38 acres in Newark's University Heights section. The university host seven degree-granting undergraduate, graduate, and professional schools, including the School of Public Affairs and Administration, Rutgers Business School (which has another campus in New Brunswick) and Rutgers Law School (which has another campus in Camden), and several research institutes, including the Institute of Jazz Studies. According to U.S. News & World Report, Rutgers–Newark is the most diverse national university in the United States.

== History ==
The roots of Rutgers–Newark date back to 1908 when the New Jersey Law School first opened its doors. That law school, along with four other educational institutions in Newark—Dana College (founded in 1927), Newark Institute of Arts and Sciences (founded in 1909), Seth Boyden School of Business (founded 1929), and Mercer Beasley School of Law (founded 1926)—would form a series of alliances over the following three decades, resulting in a final merger as the University of Newark in 1936.

In 1946, a decade later, the University of Newark was absorbed into Rutgers University after a vote by the New Jersey State Legislature, thus transforming into Rutgers–Newark.

== Organization and governance ==
=== Leadership ===
As a constituent unit of Rutgers University, ultimate authority for Rutgers–Newark rests with the central administration of the university, including its president and governing boards.

However, the campus has its own chief executive (Tonya Smith-Jackson). Up until 2008, the chief executive was known as the provost, but then-president Richard L. McCormick changed the title of the chief executive to chancellor.

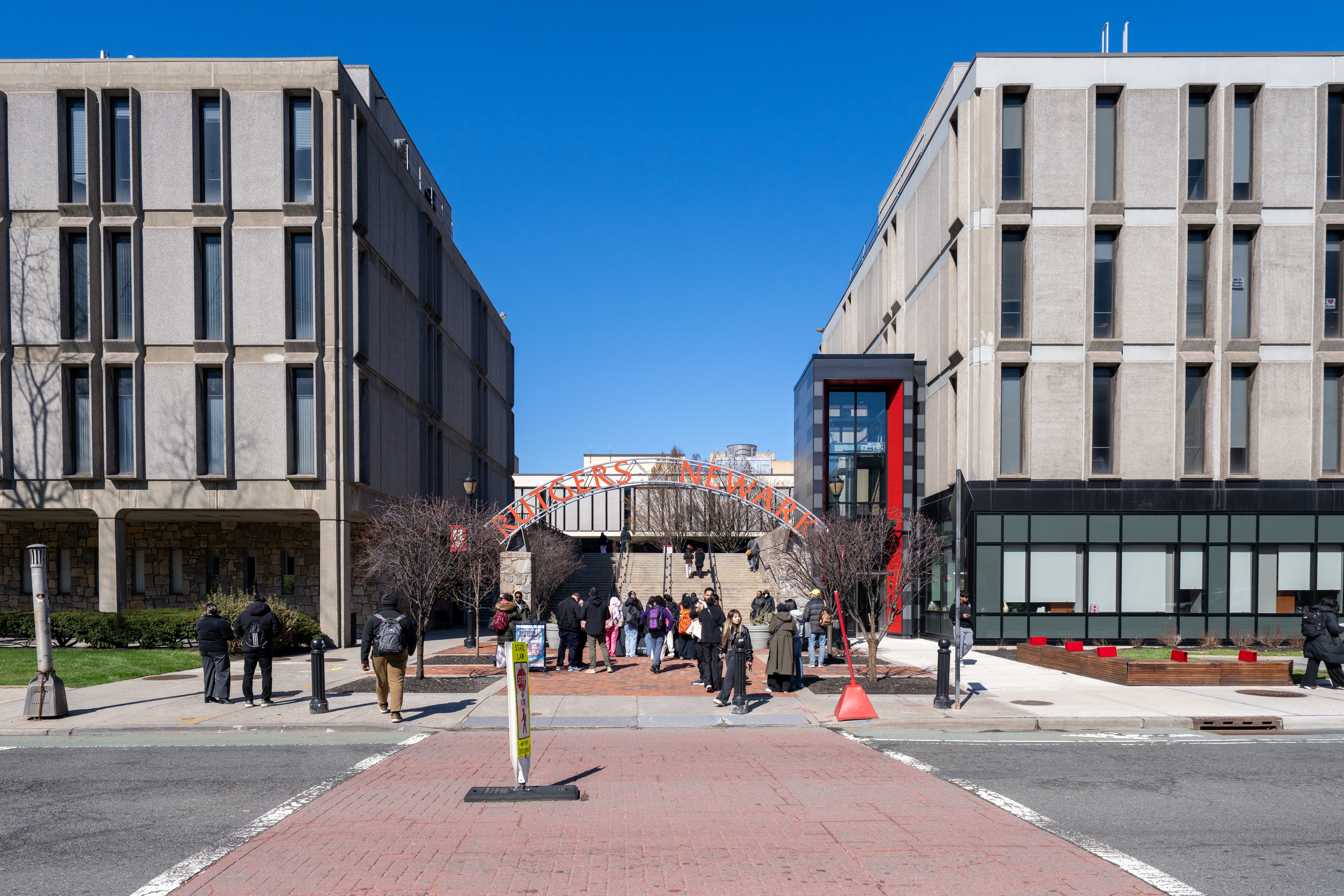
Pedestrian entrance to the Rutgers University - Newark campus

=== Constituent colleges and professional schools ===
Rutgers–Newark is located on a campus of 38 acres in Newark's University Heights neighborhood. This neighborhood is within blocks of the commercial center of the city and located near mass transit (bus, rail, and light rail stations). The campus consists of seven degree-granting undergraduate, graduate and professional schools, including: Newark College of Arts and Sciences, University College, School of Criminal Justice, Graduate School-Newark, School of Public Affairs and Administration, Rutgers Business School-Newark and New Brunswick, and Rutgers Law School (Newark campus).

The Newark College of Arts and Sciences (NCAS) enrolls more than 60 percent of the undergraduates at Rutgers University in Newark and is the largest school on campus. With majors in almost 40 fields offering BA, BS, and BFA degrees.

University College–Newark offers undergraduate programs that cater to non-traditional or part-time adult students who have obligations during the day and attend class in the evening or on Saturday.

Rutgers–Newark offers MA, MS, MFA, and Ph.D. degrees.

The School of Public Affairs and Administration offers masters and doctoral degrees in public administration (MPA, Ph.D.).

Founded in 1929, Rutgers Business School–Newark and New Brunswick offers undergraduate and graduate business programs on the Newark and New Brunswick campuses. Accredited by the Association to Advance Collegiate Schools of Business International, Rutgers Business School awards B.S., Master of Business Administration (M.B.A.) (including international executive and executive MBAs), and doctoral degrees in management.

The School of Criminal Justice is a national and international center for scholarly research on all aspects of policing, delinquency, crime, and criminal justice administration. The school also provides educational programs that fulfill public service obligations by helping to address the needs of criminal justice agencies within the city, state, nation, and world.

The Rutgers Law School (Newark campus) is the oldest law school in New Jersey.

== Academics and research ==
=== Rankings ===
Academic rankings

National
- Forbes: 212
- U.S. News & World Report: 73
- Washington Monthly: 42
- WSJ/College Pulse: 198

Global
- QS: 771–780
- U.S. News & World Report: 645

National Program Rankings
Program	Ranking
Biological Sciences	121
Business	44
Chemistry	81
Criminology	9
Law	74
Mathematics	74
Nursing: Master's	20
Psychology	81
Public Affairs	33
Public Management and Leadership	13
Supply Chain / Logistics	6
Urban Policy	10

As of 2022, Rutgers–Newark enrolls more than 12,000 students (more than 7,500 undergraduate, more than 3,500 graduate). Rutgers–Newark awards approximately 80 doctoral degrees, 250 juris doctor degrees, 1,050 master's degrees, and 1,500 baccalaureate degrees each year and was ranked 12th in the nation for quality among small research universities by the 2005 Faculty Scholarly Productivity Index.

=== Faculty ===
There are more than 500 full-time faculty members at Rutgers–Newark, 99 percent of whom hold doctor of philosophy or juris doctor degrees. Faculty on the Newark campus include or have included Pulitzer Prize recipients and members of the National Academy of Sciences, the Institute of Medicine of the National Academy of Sciences, the American Academy of Arts and Letters, the American Academy of Arts and Sciences, the American Association for the Advancement of Science, and the New York Academy of Medicine Fellow. A number of Rutgers–Newark faculty members have been awarded the prestigious Guggenheim Fellowship and named as Fulbright Fellows. Other faculty honors include the National Book Award, Japan's Order of the Rising Sun, Gold Rays with Neck Ribbon, the Grete Lundbeck European Brain Research Foundation Award ("The Brain Prize"), the Presidential Early Career Award for Scientists and Engineers.

=== Research ===
Select centers and institutes at Rutgers–Newark:

- Institute of Jazz Studies – founded 1952
- National Center for Public Performance – founded 1972
- New Jersey Small Business Development Center – founded 1977
- Center for Molecular and Behavioral Neuroscience – founded 1985
- Center for Information Management, Integration and Connectivity – founded 1995
- Division of Global Affairs – founded 1996
- Clement A. Price Institute on Ethnicity, Culture, and the Modern Experience – founded 1998
- Joseph C. Cornwall Center for Metropolitan Studies – founded 2000
- Institute on Education Law and Policy – founded 2000
- Institute for Ethical Leadership – founded 2004
- Center for Urban Entrepreneurship & Economic Development – founded 2008
- Newark Schools Research Collaborative – founded 2009
- Center on Law, Inequality and Metropolitan Equity – founded 2011
- Sheila Y. Oliver Center for Politics and Race in America – founded 2023

=== Libraries ===
- John Cotton Dana Library (including the Institute of Jazz Studies)
- Rutgers Law Library – Newark
- Don M. Gottfredson Library of Criminal Justice
- Rutgers University – Newark Archives

=== Galleries ===
- Paul Robeson Galleries

=== Artist in residence ===
The Paul Robeson Galleries (PRG) has an Artist in Residence (AiR) program open to visual artists who live or work within a 10-mile radius of Newark. It is a six months residency with a private studio located at Express Newark (EN), part of Rutgers University – Newark (it is in the former Hahne Department Store). There is an exhibition at the end of the residency at the Robeson Campus Center Gallery.

=== Community engagement ===
In 2006, the university applied for classification as a "community engaged" university. Specifically, Rutgers–Newark was classified in the Outreach and Partnerships category, recognizing the university for its ability to apply and provide collaboratively institutional resources that benefit both campus and community.

== Student life ==
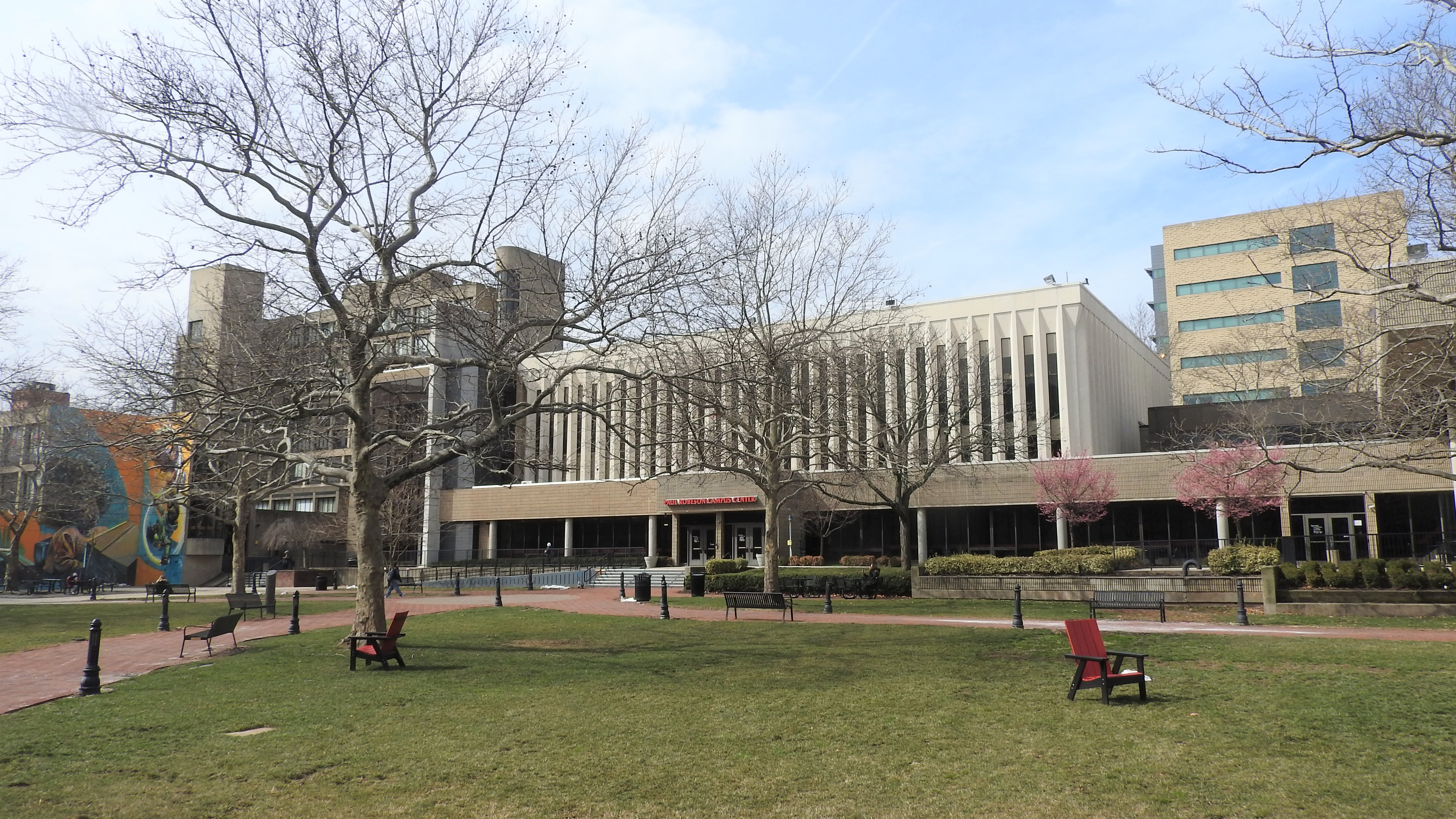
Paul Robeson Campus Center

=== Diversity ===
U.S. News & World Report "Best Colleges" has named Rutgers University's Newark campus, the most [ethnically] diverse national university in the United States since 1997.

=== Admissions and financial aid ===
Undergraduate admissions to Rutgers–Newark are classified as “selective” by U.S. News & World Report. Rutgers University in Newark receives almost 17,000 freshman and transfer applications and enrolls about 1,700 new students each year. Admissions decisions are based on academic potential as demonstrated by grades, grade-point average, class rank and test scores as well as extracurricular activities and demonstrated leadership such as volunteer work, school clubs and organizations, community service and paid employment. Merit scholarships are offered at the acceptance stage to students who demonstrate outstanding academic achievement.

Tuition for full-time, New Jersey residents attending Rutgers University in Newark is $10,954; for non-residents it is $25,732. Fees are $2,343, and the cost of room and board is $12,509.

Typically, nearly 75 percent of the entering class received an offer of financial aid from Rutgers–Newark. Using a student's Free Application for Financial Student Aid, Rutgers develops a customized financial-aid package based on the student's qualifications, financial need, and funds available to the university. A financial aid package may include any or a combination of these major financial aid sources: gift aid (e.g., grants, scholarships, and awards), loans, and work-study. Offers typically range from $500 to $24,000, with the average financial aid package reaching $16,000.

=== Student housing ===
Freshman students living on campus are assigned to Woodward Hall. These suite style accommodations are non-cooking and contain three double bedrooms, as well as a bathroom. The rooms and suites are fully furnished, and the building includes a 24-hour computer lab and laundry room.

Returning and transfer students under the age of 21 are assigned to University Square while returning and transfer students who are at least 21 years old are assigned to Talbott Apartments. Both complexes offer single rooms in either a three-person or four-person shared apartment and include a computer lab, study/social lounges, television lounges, a laundry room, and vending area.

Currently under construct, 5-story mixed use development will include a 391-bed honors dorm, and a university owned parking garage at 155 Washington Street is set to become an 18-story market rate residential building.

Attached to Woodward Hall is Stonsby Commons & Eatery for residents who are on a meal plan. While Woodward Hall residents are required to be on a meal plan, any student may purchase a meal plan and eat in all campus dining halls.

A limited number of family apartment options are available for married or domestic partners and students with children in university-owned brownstones.

The American Insurance Company Building at 15 Washington Park provides graduate student housing and includes public performance spaces and a penthouse for the school's chancellor.

=== Student media ===
There are two student-run newspapers distributed at the Newark Campus:

- The Observer (covering the Newark campus and surrounding University Heights community) began in 1936. It is published every Tuesday morning during the fall and spring semesters.
- The Newark Targum, also published weekly, began in 2006.

The campus also has a student magazine, which was founded in 2011. Early publications of Scarlet Magazine were published and distributed monthly. As of the 2023–2024 school year, issues are published each semester.

Encore is the student yearbook of the Rutgers Newark Campus. It has published a yearbook for the graduating senior class since 1936.

WRNU radio station is located in the Paul Robeson Campus Center. It offers a variety of diverse musical and talk-show programs and can be heard by residents in student housing on radio dial 103.9 FM.

The Newark Metro, a multimedia web magazine, covers metropolitan life from Newark and North Jersey to New York City. It is produced by students at Rutgers–Newark under the direction of Professor Robert W. Snyder.

=== Safety and security ===
Residence halls operate on electronic lock systems requiring card access 24 hours a day or are staffed 24 hours a day by security guards. Security cameras in residence halls, parking lots, and in other locations act as a deterrent to criminal behavior and serve as an investigative tool. Commissioned police officers supported by other trained personnel patrol regularly.

Each year, the Division of Public Safety conducts workshops for students at orientation, in residence halls, and through “RU Safe” events, which are broadcast over the Rutgers television network. More detailed information on safety procedures is available through the Safety Matters newsletter published annually.

== Athletics ==
Rutgers-Newark athletics logo

The Rutgers–Newark's athletic teams are called the Scarlet Raiders. The university is a member in the Division III level of the National Collegiate Athletic Association (NCAA), primarily competing in the New Jersey Athletic Conference (NJAC) for most of its sports since the 1985–86 academic year; except men's volleyball, which the NJAC does not sponsor. In that sport, the Scarlet Raiders are members of the Continental Volleyball Conference (CVC).

Rutgers–Newark competes in 14 intercollegiate varsity sports (7 each for men and women): Men's sports include baseball, basketball, cross country, soccer, track & field (indoor and outdoor) and volleyball; while women's sports include basketball, cross country, soccer, softball, track & field (indoor and outdoor) and volleyball.

=== Facilities ===
Built in 1977, the Golden Dome Athletic Center is the hub of Rutgers–Newark athletics, seating 2,000. Soccer and softball games are held on Frederick Douglass Field, while the Rutgers–Newark baseball team plays at Weequahic Park.

== Alumni ==
- Mussab Ali (born 1997), politician, Rutgers-Newark's first ever Truman Scholar
- Richard H. Bagger, former chief of staff, New Jersey Governor Chris Christie, former state senator
- Michael Patrick Carroll, New Jersey assemblyman (R-25th District)
- Ida L. Castro, first Latina commissioner of the New Jersey Department of Personnel
- Raymond G. Chambers, philanthropist and humanitarian; chairman, MCJ Amelior Foundation
- Ronald Chen, former New Jersey Public Advocate, acting dean of Rutgers School of Law-Newark
- Alex Chilowicz, professional soccer referee and musician
- Marianne Espinosa, judge, Supreme Court of New Jersey
- Charles Evered, writer/director
- Zulima Farber, former New Jersey Attorney General
- Louis J. Freeh, former director, Federal Bureau of Investigation
- Nia Gill, New Jersey Senator representing the 34th district
- Paula Grossman, music educator and transgender activist
- Wade Henderson, president & chief executive officer, The Leadership Conference on Civil & Human Rights
- Richard J. Hughes, former governor of New Jersey; chief justice of the Supreme Court of New Jersey
- Frank Iero, rhythm guitarist and back-up vocalist of rock band My Chemical Romance and post-hardcore band Leathermouth
- Jerry Izenberg, syndicated daily sports columnist
- Jaynee LaVecchia, justice of the Supreme Court of New Jersey
- Virginia Long, retired justice of the Supreme Court of New Jersey
- George McPhee, vice president and general manager for the Vegas Golden Knights of the National Hockey League
- Robert Menendez, United States Senator representing New Jersey
- Patrick Morrisey, current governor of West Virginia
- Ozzie Nelson, radio and television entertainer
- Ronald L. Rice, New Jersey Senator representing the 32nd district
- Esther Salas, judge, United States District Court for the District of New Jersey
- Judith Viorst, author and columnist for Redbook magazine; recipient of Emmy Award in 1970
- Elizabeth Warren, United States Senator representing Massachusetts; Leo Gottlieb Professor of Law at Harvard Law School; named one of the "100 Most Influential People in the World" by Time magazine in 2009
- Tracey Scott Wilson, playwright
- Ramy Youssef, stand-up comedian and writer best known for his work on the Golden Globe-winning Hulu series Ramy

== See also ==
- Colonial colleges
- Henry Rutgers
- Public Ivy
- Post-secondary education in New Jersey
- List of American state universities
