= Tonya Smith-Jackson =

American human factors engineer and academic administrator

- Education: University of North Carolina, Chapel Hill (BA); North Carolina State University (MS, PhD)
- Scientific career
- Fields: Human factors engineering, systems safety, cognitive ergonomics
- Institutions: Virginia Tech; North Carolina A&T State University; Rutgers University

Tonya Smith-Jackson is an American human factors engineer and academic administrator. She assumed the position of chancellor of Rutgers University–Newark in August 2025. Smith-Jackson previously served as provost and executive vice chancellor for academic affairs at North Carolina A&T State University. Her career includes roles in academia at Virginia Tech, in government with the National Science Foundation, and in the corporate sector with IBM and Ericsson Mobile Communications.

== Education ==
Smith-Jackson graduated from the North Carolina School of Science and Mathematics, as part of its inaugural class. She earned a B.A. in psychology from the University of North Carolina at Chapel Hill. Following this, she attended North Carolina State University, where she received a M.S. in interdisciplinary psychology/ergonomics and industrial engineering and a Ph.D. in psychology/ergonomics.

Her master's thesis was titled, "Effects of Body Consciousness on Perceptual Motor Task Performance." Her doctoral dissertation was titled, "Irrelevant Speech, Verbal Task Performance, and Focused Attention: A Laboratory Examination of the Performance Dynamics of Open-plan Offices."

== Career ==
Smith-Jackson's early career included engineering roles at IBM and Ericsson Mobile Communications. She worked as a human factors specialist for software usability and interface design at IBM in Research Triangle Park from 1987 to 1988. At Ericsson, she was a human factors specialist for usability and interface design from 1997 to 1998, where she worked on mobile phone design from concept to market. She also held faculty positions at various universities and community colleges in North Carolina, New York, Virginia, and Germany.

From 1999 to 2013, Smith-Jackson was on the faculty at Virginia Tech, advancing from assistant professor to full professor of industrial and systems engineering. During her 14 years at the university, she founded and directed the Assessment and Cognitive Ergonomics (ACE) Laboratory and served as co-director of the Safety Engineering Laboratory and the Human–computer interaction Laboratory. She also directed the Human Factors Engineering and Ergonomics Center. From 2008 to 2009, she was a scholar-in-residence and engineering psychologist at the U.S. Consumer Product Safety Commission.

=== North Carolina A&T State University ===
In 2013, Smith-Jackson joined North Carolina A&T State University (NC A&T) as professor and chair of the Department of Industrial and Systems Engineering. In this role, she also founded the Human Factors Analytics Laboratory. She later co-founded the Cyber-Human Analytics Research for the Internet-of-Things (CHARIOT) Laboratory and served as director for the Center for Advanced Studies in Identity Sciences.

From 2018 to 2019, she served as a program director for the Cyber-Human Systems Program in the Computer and Information Science and Engineering (CISE) Directorate of the National Science Foundation (NSF).

After her detail at the NSF, Smith-Jackson returned to NC A&T and was appointed senior vice provost for Academic Affairs. She was named interim provost and executive vice chancellor of academic affairs, effective January 1, 2022, and was permanently appointed to the position on September 30, 2022. As provost, she oversaw the launch of three new doctoral programs and the creation of North Carolina's first bachelor's degree program in artificial intelligence. She also managed the establishment of three new Centers of Excellence in cybersecurity, product design and manufacturing, and entrepreneurship and innovation. During her tenure at A&T, she received several honors, including being named a Fellow of the Human Factors and Ergonomics Society in 2016, receiving the Distinguished Educator Award from the Industrial Engineering and Operations Management (IEOM) Society International in 2018, and the society's Diversity and Inclusion Award in 2020.

=== Rutgers University–Newark ===
In May 2025, the Rutgers Board of Governors unanimously approved Smith-Jackson's appointment as the next chancellor of Rutgers University–Newark. She assumed the role on August 1, 2025.

== Research ==
Smith-Jackson's research interests include cyber-human analytics, systems safety, cognitive ergonomics, and human factors. She co-edited the book Cultural Ergonomics: Theory, Methods, & Applications, published in 2013.
