= Carol Ruth Silver =

American lawyer

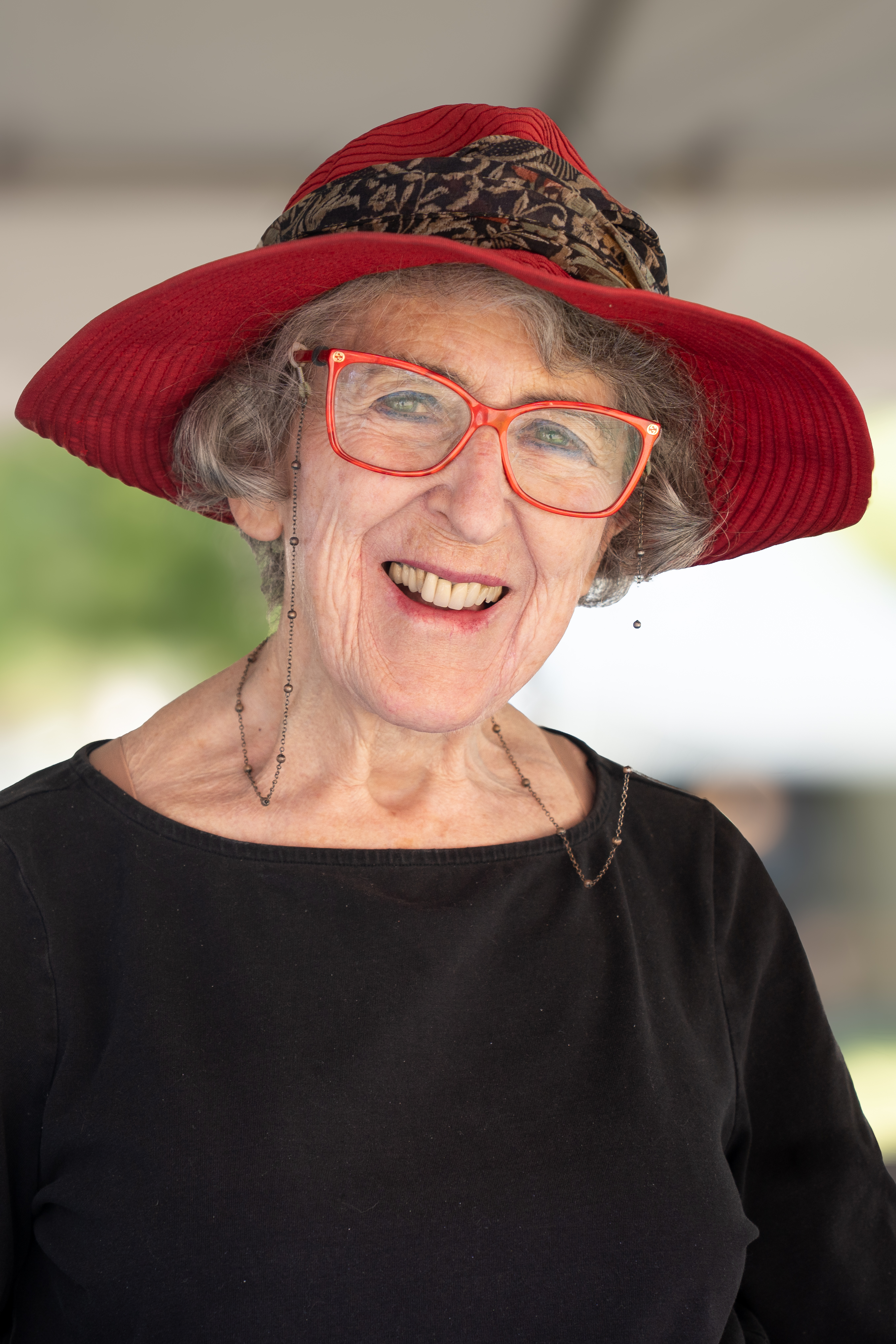
- Silver at the 2026 Los Angeles Times Festival of Books

Member of the San Francisco Board of Supervisors
- In office January 8, 1981 – January 8, 1989
- Preceded by: District established
- Succeeded by: Terence Hallinan

Personal details
- Born: October 1, 1938 (age 88) Boston, Massachusetts
- Party: Democratic
- Education: University of Chicago
- Profession: Attorney

Carol Ruth Silver (born October 1, 1938) is an American lawyer and civil rights activist. She was a Freedom Rider, arrested and incarcerated for 40 days in Mississippi. She was among those on the San Francisco Board of Supervisors allegedly targeted by Dan White in the Moscone–Milk assassinations, but escaped assassination because she was not in her office at the time of the murders.

== Early life and education ==
Silver grew up in a Jewish family in Worcester, Massachusetts. She attended the University of Chicago, earning a bachelor's degree in 1960 and a J.D. degree in 1964. She was a fellow at the John F. Kennedy School of Government at Harvard University.

From 1967 to 1973, she was married to Don Kates, also a gun rights activist.

== Career ==
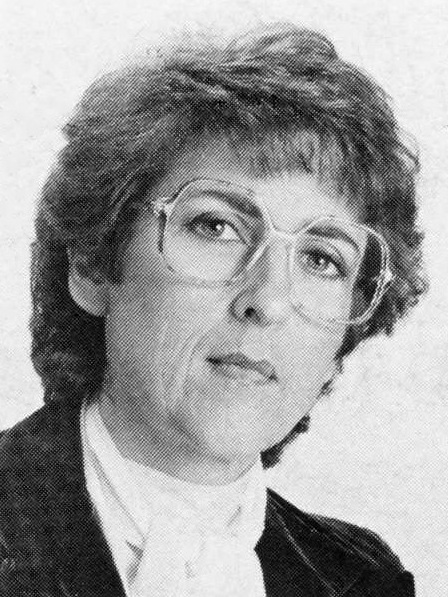
Silver in 1983

Silver moved to California and served on the faculties of Golden Gate University School of Law, Lone Mountain College (now part of the University of San Francisco), and San Francisco State. She served with the California Rural Legal Assistance program.

=== Freedom Riders ===
In 1961, she was a Freedom Rider during the Civil Rights Movement, civil rights activists who rode buses into the South to challenge ongoing racial segregation by deliberately violating the laws for separate waiting rooms at interstate bus stations. She recalled in 2011,

"On June 2, 1961, I got on a bus in New York bound for Jackson. The bus went to Nashville, where we wrote our wills. When we arrived in Jackson, on June 7, I went into the bus station waiting room marked 'Colored.' I took three steps and was arrested and transported to the city jail."

Silver was sentenced to six months in jail but was released after serving 40 days. In 2011, on the 50th anniversary of the Freedom Riders, she appeared on the Oprah Winfrey Show to talk about the experience. In 2014, she published a book, Freedom Rider Diary: Smuggled Notes from Parchman Prison.

=== Political career ===
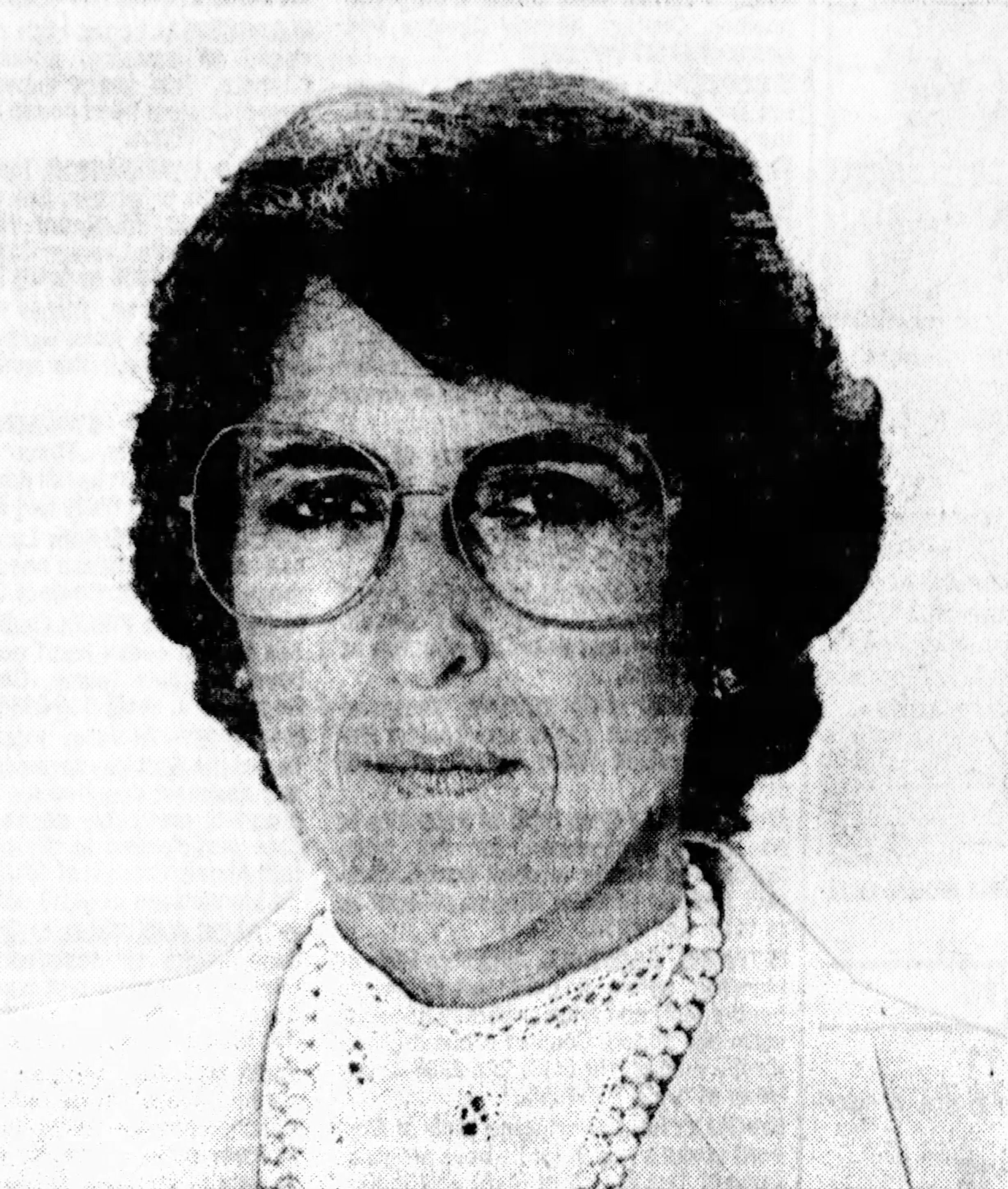
Silver in 1987 while serving in the San Francisco Board of Supervisors.

Silver began her political career in 1970, running for city auditor in Berkeley. She then moved to San Francisco and ran for the city's Board of Supervisors. Silver's 1977 election was part of a shift toward diversity on the San Francisco Board of Supervisors; she was described as "the board's first unwed mother".

"As a colleague of Harvey Milk, our legacy was to significantly shift the balance of power to younger and less affluent people in the city of San Francisco. We were the first district-elected supervisors who had roots in the ethnic communities of the city," Silver said in 2011.

==== Moscone-Milk assassinations ====
In 1984, former city supervisor Dan White reportedly confessed to San Francisco Police Department homicide detective Frank Falzon, six years after he shot and killed San Francisco Mayor George Moscone and Harvey Milk, that the murders were premeditated. Falzon said White told him he planned to kill not just Milk and Moscone, but also Silver and state assemblyman Willie Brown. White had been acquitted of first-degree murder and convicted of voluntary manslaughter after his attorneys argued he had diminished capacity at the time of the murders, using what became known as the "Twinkie defense". White served five years in prison for the two murders.

In 1998, Falzon quoted White as having told him:

"I was on a mission. I wanted four of them. Carol Ruth Silver – she was the biggest snake of the bunch. And Willie Brown. He was masterminding the whole thing."

Falzon indicated that he had believed White's initial claim, saying

"I felt like I had been hit by a sledgehammer … I found out it was a premeditated murder."

White reportedly blamed all four for refusing to allow him to be reappointed to the board, days after he had resigned. Silver was in her law office during the time of the shootings, while Brown, the future mayor, had just left the building.

During White's trial in 1979, Silver testified for the prosecution, stating she did not believe his claim of being mentally ill. Silver maintained her stance following White's acquittal, saying:

"Dan White has gotten away with murder. It's as simple as that.":

During the White Night riots that erupted in the city following the news of White's acquittal, Silver was injured when struck by a flying object. In 1998, Silver further elaborated on her view of White's crimes:

"I always believed Dan White got away with murder, that he entered City Hall with the full intent to shoot George, and perhaps a lesser intent to shoot Harvey. I never really believed he was out to get me, but now I do."

=== Support of gun rights ===
In 1985, after Bernhard Goetz shot and wounded four attackers on a New York City Subway train, Silver wrote in The Wall Street Journal:

"The legality of the actions of the 'subway vigilante' cannot be determined until all the facts are in. What is already clear is that the New York officials denouncing him misconceive the law of self-defense.... A subway rider attacked by armed criminals has every right to shoot in self-defense... Rational gun control is a necessity. But New York City's long history of prohibiting ordinary, responsible adults the only realistic means of self-defense is not rational."

San Francisco Police Chief Con Murphy responded to Silver's views on guns:

"I don't like it. Keeping guns at home creates more problems than it solves. It creates a false sense of security."

In an interview, Silver said that every citizen who feels threatened by crime should have a gun in his or her home or office, and that many San Franciscans should have guns because police will not protect them.

In her book Self Defense Handgun Ownership and the Independence of Women in a Violent Sexist Society (edited by Don B. Kates Jr.), Silver argued that, by carrying guns, women advance the cause of women's rights:

"For men know that throughout all the prior ages of history the bottom line in male-female relationships has always been woman's need for male protection. Women could not live alone for fear of predation by males. So they lived with a male protector and accepted his dictation of their role, either as a condition of receiving his protection, or because he would impose it upon them by physical force, or both. Access to firearms gives women, for the first time in history, the capacity to live independently and apart from men in safety and freedom."

=== Later career ===
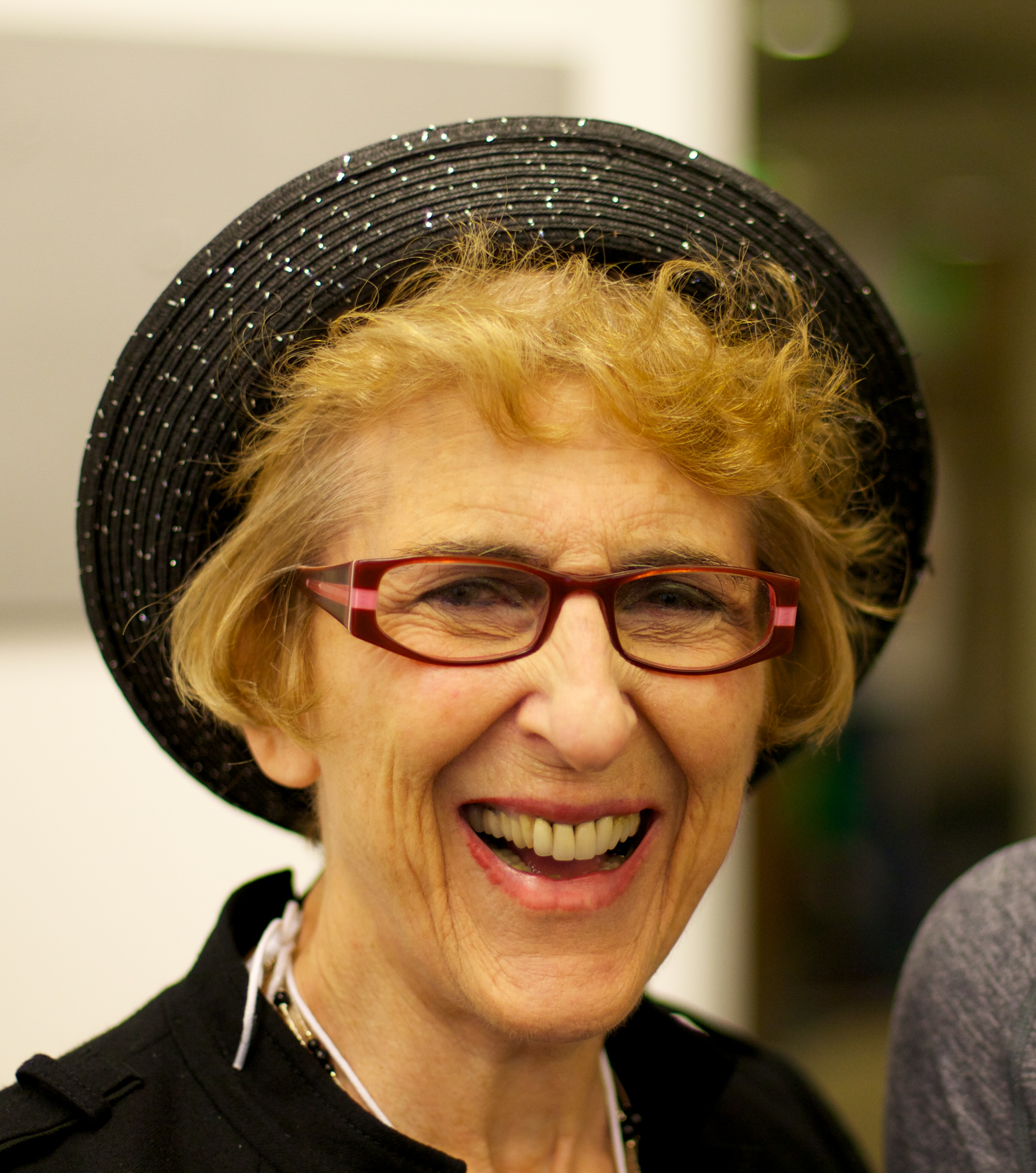
Silver at OLPC San Francisco Community Summit 2012.

Silver served three terms on the Board of Supervisors, stepping down in 1989. She ran in the Democratic primary for California's 1st congressional district, in 1996, but lost to Michela Alioto (who then lost to incumbent Frank Riggs). Silver ran in the 2000 District 6 supervisorial race, coming in fourth.

Silver then retired from politics and continued her philanthropic work, which had included founding San Francisco's Chinese American International School in 1982, the first and most modeled Mandarin Chinese immersion program in the United States. In the summer of 2002 she traveled to Afghanistan to explore ways that American citizens could extend a hand of friendship to the Afghan people, and she has founded or co-founded three organizations dedicated in different ways to supporting and promoting education in Afghanistan, particularly of women and girls.

In 2007, Silver was appointed director of the San Francisco Sheriff's Department's Office of Prisoner Legal Services. She resigned the position in 2009, stating her reluctance to work in a system that supported the war on drugs. She wrote in her resignation letter:

"I have found myself having to bite my tongue in talking to some prisoners about their charges – at least half of them with nonviolent drug charges. I find it difficult to discuss the financial or child custody problems of a prisoner, when I cannot look them in the eye and justify their being in jail." She has since lent her support to Law Enforcement Against Prohibition.

== In media ==
Silver played a small part as Thelma, a speechwriter, in the 2008 Academy Award-winning film Milk, a biographical film of her late friend and coworker. She herself was portrayed by actress Wendy King.

== Published works ==
- Carol Ruth Silver (2014). Freedom Rider Diary: Smuggled Notes from Parchman Prison. University Press of Mississippi. ISBN 978-1-61703-887-7.
- Carol Ruth Silver (1979). Don B. Kates, Jr. (ed.). Self Defense Handgun Ownership and the Independence of Women in a Violent Sexist Society. North River Press. ISBN 978-0-88427-034-8.
