= Johann Cramer =

Johann Cramer may refer to:

- Johann Ulrich von Cramer (1706–1772), German judge, legal scholar, and Enlightenment philosopher
- Johann Baptist Cramer (1771–1858), German composer
- Johann Cramer (politician) (1905–1987), German SPD politician

== See also ==
- John Cramer (disambiguation)
