= Terence Thornberry =

American criminologist

Terence P. Thornberry
- Education: Fordham University; University of Pennsylvania
- Known for: Delinquency
- Awards: 2008 Edwin H. Sutherland Award from the American Society of Criminology
- Scientific career
- Fields: Criminology
- Institutions: University of Maryland; University of Colorado Boulder; University at Albany, SUNY
- Thesis: Punishment and crime: The effect of legal dispositions on subsequent criminal behavior (1971)

Terence Patrick Thornberry is an American criminologist who has been a Distinguished University Professor in the Department of Criminology and Criminal Justice at the University of Maryland since 2012. Before he joined the faculty of the University of Maryland in 2009, he was a professor of sociology at the University of Colorado Boulder and the director of their Problem Behavior Program from 2004 to 2009. Before that, he was a professor at the University at Albany, SUNY from 1984 to 2001, and a Distinguished Professor there from 2001 to 2004. He served as the dean of the University at Albany, SUNY School of Criminal Justice from 1984 to 1988 and as director of the Hindelang Criminal Justice Research Center there from 1997 to 2003. He is known for his research on delinquency, including the "interactional theory" he proposed in 1987 to explain its origins. This theory is based on Travis Hirschi's work on social bonding and Ronald Akers' work on social learning theory.
