= Darrell Steffensmeier =

American criminologist

Darrell John Steffensmeier
- Born: 1942 (age 83–84)
- Education: University of Iowa
- Awards: Edwin H. Sutherland Award (ASC, 2023); ASC Outstanding Article Award (2012, 2018); ASC Outstanding Book Award (2006); SSSP Outstanding Book Award (1987)
- Scientific career
- Fields: Sociology, criminology
- Workplaces: Pennsylvania State University; North Carolina State University (1972–1975)
- Thesis: Respectability and deviance: an observational study of reactions to shoplifting (1972)
- Website: sociology.la.psu.edu/people/darrell-steffensmeier

Darrell John Steffensmeier (born 1942) is an American criminologist and Liberal Arts Research Professor of Sociology and Criminology at Pennsylvania State University. He is the John Kramer Professor of Sociology and Criminology, Emeritus, at The Pennsylvania State University. He received the 2023 Edwin H. Sutherland Award from the American Society of Criminology, the society's highest honor for outstanding scholarly contributions to the field.

Steffensmeier's research examines how social statuses — gender, age, race-ethnicity, and place — influence criminal involvement and social responses to crime. His contributions to criminological theory span several areas: Focal Concerns Theory of judicial decision making; criminal careers and illegal markets; temporal and international variability in the age-crime relationship; trends in female offending and the gender gap; sex segregation in the underworld; and crime opportunity theory. He uses mixed methods, combining qualitative, quantitative, experimental, survey, and archival approaches.

He retired at the end of the 2023–2024 academic year and holds the title of Emeritus Professor. He is a Fellow of the American Society of Criminology and has received three ASC Outstanding Article Awards (2012, 2018) and the ASC Outstanding Book Award (2006).

== Education ==
Steffensmeier grew up on a farm near St. Paul, Iowa, and graduated from St. James High School in 1960. After receiving his bachelor's degrees in philosophy and history from St. Ambrose University, Steffensmeier received his M.A. and Ph.D. in sociology from the University of Iowa in 1970 and 1972, respectively.

== Career ==
Steffensmeier began his academic career as Assistant Professor of Sociology at North Carolina State University in 1972. He joined the faculty of Pennsylvania State University in 1975, and was appointed Liberal Arts Research Professor there in 2015. He received the John Kramer Professorship of Criminology in 2019. He retired at the end of the 2023–2024 academic year and holds the title of Emeritus Professor of Sociology and Criminology.

== Research ==
Steffensmeier's research focuses on the relationship between societal categories, such as race, sex, age, and class, and crime. He has published multiple studies examining gender differences in white-collar crime. These studies have shown that women tend to be involved in such crime at much lower rates than men, and that when women are involved in it, their positions tend to be less important and less profitable.

Steffensmeier's research develops criminological theory across six areas: criminal careers and illegal markets; the age crime relationship; gender and crime; ecology of crime; sentencing and courts; and crime opportunity theory. His work combines ethnographic, quantitative, survey, and archival methods.

=== Focal Concerns Theory of sentencing ===
Steffensmeier initially developed the core concepts of Focal Concerns Theory (FCT) in a 1980 article in Crime and Delinquency ("Assessing the impact of the women's movement on sex-based differences in the handling of adult criminal defendants") and a 1982 article in Sociology and Social Research ("Sex-based differences in the sentencing of adult criminal defendants: An empirical test and theoretical overview"). FCT was subsequently elaborated with colleagues John Kramer and Jeffery Ulmer in a 1998 article in Criminology, "The Interaction of Race, Gender, and Age in Criminal Sentencing: The Punishment Cost of Being Young, Black, and Male." A 2000 article in American Sociological Review with Stephen Demuth ("Ethnicity and Sentencing Outcomes in U.S. Federal Courts") further extended the framework.

FCT posits that sentencing decisions are shaped by three focal concerns that judges evaluate:

- Blameworthiness of the offender: evaluating culpability, harm caused, and remorse.
- Protection of society: assessing the defendant's threat to public safety, including potential future criminality and rehabilitative amenability.
- Practical considerations and organizational realities: considering consequences for defendants, the criminal justice system, victims, and communities.

In 2023, Steffensmeier and Kramer introduced fairness as a fourth focal concern at the annual meeting of the American Society of Criminology, arguing that evenhandedness and integrity in sentencing decisions — in terms of outcome and process for defendants and other stakeholders, as well as the community and society at large — should be treated as a distinct concern alongside the original three.

FCT has become one of the most widely used theoretical frameworks in sentencing research. A 2026 article in the Asian Journal of Criminology by Steffensmeier, Kramer, and Painter-Davis reviewed the global expansion of FCT-based sentencing research and elaborated the theory's core components in response to international findings.

Steffensmeier's research on sentencing is traceable to his dissertation. Published in a 1973 Social Forces article, it consisted of a field experiment in which rigged shoplifting events were enacted in the presence of store customers in a position to observe and react to hippie- or conventional-looking shoplifters. Store customers were much more likely to report hippie-looking shoplifters and more enthusiastically. Follow up interviews and on-site observations indicated that subjects holding negative stereotypes of "hippies" were most likely to report.

=== Criminal careers and illegal markets ===
Steffensmeier's research on criminal careers and illegal markets draws on ethnographic and quantitative studies of fencing, organized crime, and illegal enterprise. His book The Fence: In the Shadow of Two Worlds (1986), based on observational research with a veteran thief over three decades, received the 1987 Outstanding Scholarship Award from the Society for the Study of Social Problems. His book Confessions of a Dying Thief (2005, with Jeffery Ulmer) combined life-history interviews with network analysis to study the structure of illegal markets and the careers of professional thieves; it received the 2006 ASC Michael J. Hindelang Award. Steffensmeier has also published studies of numbers gambling, corporate fraud, and the organizational properties of offender networks.

=== Temporal and international variability in the age-crime relationship ===
Steffensmeier's research on the age–crime curve challenges the Hirschi–Gottfredson claim that the relationship between age and crime is invariant across cultures and historical periods. His 1989 American Journal of Sociology article with Emilie Allan established the empirical foundation for this work. Subsequent studies using data from Taiwan, South Korea, India, Botswana, and the United States show that cultural context and social change can modify the age–crime relationship. A 2025 Annual Review of Criminology article synthesised international and historical variation in the curve, and a 2025 Journal of Criminal Justice article evaluated neurobiological claims about the age–crime relationship against international evidence.

=== Trends in female offending and the gender gap ===
A longstanding focus of Steffensmeier's work is explaining trends in female offending and the gender gap in crime, drawing on arrest data, self-report surveys, and qualitative studies. His central finding is that the gender gap in serious crime (e.g., homicide) has remained stable, while the gap in minor crimes (e.g., larceny) has narrowed. He questions the role of greater gender equality in driving the trends and instead points to female economic marginality, expanding opportunities for female-typed crimes, declining male rates, and net-widening enforcement. The 1996 Annual Review of Sociology review with Emilie Allan remains a standard reference, and a 2023 Journal of Interpersonal Violence assessment examined 21st-century trends in girls' violence.

Related work asks whether the effects of structural disadvantage (poverty, family structure) on crime rates differ for women versus men, and by race–ethnicity. Steffensmeier and Haynie reported that the same structural predictors explain female and male rates, though effect sizes are smaller for women.

=== Sex segregation in the underworld ===
In a 1983 Social Forces article, Steffensmeier offered the first criminological theory positing that organizational properties of offender groups shape women's roles and participation in lucrative, organized crime. The theory explains the exclusion and underrepresentation of women in economically motivated crime, and the variability of sex segregation across offense types. Men are more likely to commit crime with a woman when a romantic relationship exists, when a woman has carved out a niche in the underworld, or when there is utility in deploying her for safety or profitability. The concept of "institutionalized sexism in the underworld" has since been applied to explain gender differences in upperworld crime, including corporate fraud.

=== Crime opportunity theory ===
Steffensmeier has advanced crime opportunity theory with an actor-centered approach organised around the concept of criminal capital — an individual's or group's capacity to mobilise resources, contacts, skills, and selection-collaboration networks that facilitate crime. Three access dimensions structure the theory: access to crime-favorable relationships, situations, and environments; access to capability (skills, resourcefulness, physical strength); and access to selection-collaboration (recruiting, being recruited). Steffensmeier emphasises the link between opportunity and motivation: those able to commit crime become more willing to offend, and the criminally motivated are also better positioned to see and create opportunities.

With Emilie Allan and Jennifer Schwartz, Steffensmeier combines a gendered crime-opportunity perspective with gendered focal concerns. For women, the focal concerns are nurturant role obligations, beauty and sexual desirability, and moral virtue; for men, they are individualistic autonomy, status in the public sphere, and sexual access to women. Steffensmeier and Schwartz applied this framework in a 2013 American Sociological Review study of 21st-century corporate fraud, showing minimal and marginal female involvement in corporate criminal networks.

Steffensmeier's research has been supported by the National Science Foundation and the National Institute of Justice. He served as Project Director and Principal Writer of Organized Crime in Pennsylvania—A Decade of Change: 1990 Report for the Pennsylvania Crime Commission.

== Honors, awards and positions ==
Two of Steffensmeier's books have won scholarship awards (one from the Society for the Study of Social Problems and one from the American Society of Criminology). He is a fellow of the American Society of Criminology and past president of the International Association for the Study of Organized Crime.

- 2023: Edwin H. Sutherland Award, American Society of Criminology — the society's highest honor, recognising outstanding scholarly contributions to criminology.
- 2019: John Kramer Professorship of Criminology, Penn State University.
- 2018: Outstanding Article Award, American Society of Criminology, for "Age and Its Relation to Crime in Taiwan and United States: Invariant, or Does Cultural Context Matter?" (with Hua Zhong, Yunmei Lu).
- 2015: Distinguished Research Professor Award, Penn State University.
- 2012: Outstanding Article Award, American Society of Criminology, for "Scope and Conceptual Issues in Testing the Racial Invariance Hypothesis: White, Black, and Hispanic Comparisons" (with Jeffery Ulmer, Ben Feldmeyer, and Casey Harris).
- 2009: Outstanding Graduate Teaching Award, Penn State University.
- 2007: Faculty Scholars Medal for outstanding achievement in Social and Behavioral Sciences, Penn State University.
- 2006: Outstanding Book Award, American Society of Criminology, for Confessions of a Dying Thief (with Jeffery Ulmer).
- 1994: Fellow, American Society of Criminology.
- 1989: Distinction in the Social Sciences, Penn State University.
- 1987: Outstanding Book Award, Society for the Study of Social Problems, for The Fence: In the Shadow of Two Worlds.

== Selected publications ==
=== Books ===
- Steffensmeier, D. & Ulmer, J. (2005). Confessions of a Dying Thief: Understanding Criminal Careers and Illegal Enterprise. Aldine-Transaction. (Recipient of the 2006 ASC Outstanding Book Award.)
- Steffensmeier, D. (1986). The Fence: In the Shadow of Two Worlds. Rowman and Littlefield. (Recipient of the 1987 SSSP Outstanding Book Award.)
- Steffensmeier, D. & Terry, R.M. (1976). Examining Deviance Experimentally. Alfred Press.

=== Articles ===
- Steffensmeier, D. (1980). "Assessing the impact of the women's movement on sex-based differences in the handling of adult criminal defendants." Crime and Delinquency, 26, 344–357.
- Steffensmeier, D. (1980). "A review and assessment of sex differences in adult crime, 1965–77." Social Forces, 58, 1080–1108.
- Steffensmeier, D. & Steffensmeier, R.H. (1980). "Trends in female delinquency: a review of arrest, court, self-report, and field data." Criminology, 18, 62–85. (with Renee Hoffman Steffensmeier)
- Steffensmeier, D. & Kramer, J. (1982). "Sex-based differences in the sentencing of adult criminal defendants: An empirical test and theoretical overview." Sociology and Social Research, 66, 289–304.
- Steffensmeier, D. & Cobb, M. (1982). "Sex differences in urban arrest patterns, 1934–79: Stability or change?" Social Problems, 29, 37–50.
- Steffensmeier, D. (1983). "An organizational perspective on sex segregation in the underworld: Building a sociological theory of sex differences in crime." Social Forces, 61, 1010–1032.
- Steffensmeier, D. & Terry, R. (1986). "Institutional sexism in the underworld: a view from the inside." Sociological Inquiry, 56, 304–323.
- Steffensmeier, D. & Allan, E. (1989). "Age and the Distribution of Crime." American Journal of Sociology, 94, 803–831.
- Steffensmeier, D. & Allan, E. (1989). "Modernization and female crime: a cross-national test of alternative explanations." Social Forces, 68, 262–283.
- Allan, E. & Steffensmeier, D. (1989). "Youth, underemployment, and property crime: effects of the quantity and the quality of job opportunities on juvenile and young adult arrest rates." American Sociological Review, 54, 107–123.
- Steffensmeier, D., Streifel, C. & Shihadeh, E. (1992). "Cohort Size and Crime Rates Over the Life Course: The Easterlin Hypothesis Reconsidered." American Sociological Review, 57, 306–314.
- Steffensmeier, D. & Streifel, C. (1992). "Time-series Analysis of Female-to-Male Arrests for Property Crimes, 1960–1985: A Test of Alternative Explanations." Justice Quarterly, 9, 78–103.
- Harer, M. & Steffensmeier, D. (1992). "Differing Effects of Income Inequality on Black and White Offending Rates." Social Forces, 70, 1035–1054.
- Steffensmeier, D. & Allan, E. (1996). "Gender and Crime: Toward a Gendered Paradigm of Female Offending." Annual Review of Sociology, 22, 459–487.
- Steffensmeier, D., Ulmer, J., & Kramer, J. (1998). "The Interaction of Race, Gender, and Age in Criminal Sentencing: The Punishment Cost of Being Young, Black, and Male." Criminology, 36(4), 763–798.
- Steffensmeier, D. & Herbert, C. (1999). "Men and Women Decisionmakers: Does the Judge's Gender Affect the Sentencing of Criminal Defendants." Social Forces, 77, 1163–1196.
- Steffensmeier, D. & Harer, M. (1999). "Making Sense of Recent U.S. Crime Trends, 1980–98: Age Composition Effects and Other Explanations." Journal of Research in Crime & Delinquency, 36, 235–274.
- Steffensmeier, D. & Demuth, S. (2000). "Ethnicity and Sentencing Outcomes in U.S. Federal Courts: Who is Punished More Harshly?" American Sociological Review, 65, 705–729. (Extension of FCT.)
- Steffensmeier, D. & Haynie, D. (2000). "Gender, Structural Disadvantage, and Urban Crime: Do Macrosocial Variables Also Explain Female Offending Rates?" Criminology, 38, 403–438.
- Steffensmeier, D., Ulmer, J., Feldmeyer, B., & Harris, C. (2010). "Scope and Conceptual Issues in Testing the Racial Invariance Hypothesis: White, Black, and Hispanic Comparisons." Criminology, 48, 1133–1169. (Recipient of the 2012 ASC Outstanding Article Award.)
- Steffensmeier, D., Zhong, H. & Lu, Y. (2017). "Age and Its Relation to Crime in Taiwan and United States: Invariant, or Does Cultural Context Matter?" Criminology, 55, 377–404.
- Steffensmeier, D. & Painter-Davis, N. (2018). "Focal Concerns Theory as Conceptual Tool for Studying Intersectionality in Sentencing Disparities: Focus on Gender and Race along with Age." In J. Ulmer and M. Bradley (Eds.), Punishment Decisions: Locations of Disparity. Routledge.
- Steffensmeier, D., Schwartz, J., Slepicka, J. & Zhong, H. (2023). "Twenty-First Century Trends in Girls' Violence and the Gender Gap: Triangulated findings from official and unofficial longitudinal sources." Journal of Interpersonal Violence, 38, 9818–9844.
- Steffensmeier, D., Slepicka, J., Sebeelo, T., & Uhl, J. (2024). "Age and the Distribution of Crime in Botswana, Africa: Comparisons with USA, Taiwan, South Korea, Namibia, and HG Invariance Norm." Asian Journal of Criminology, 19, 617–638.
- Steffensmeier, D. & Schwartz, J. (2025). "Rethinking the Age-Crime Curve: Neurobiological Claims, International Evidence, and Sociocultural Alternatives." Journal of Criminal Justice.
- Steffensmeier, D., Slepicka, J., Schwartz, J. & Lu, Y. (2025). "Has Postponed Entry into Adult Roles Modified U.S. Age-Crime Curves? Age-Arrest Patterns of Teens, Emerging Adults, and Adult Age Groups, 1980–2019." Justice Quarterly, 42, 533–586.
- Steffensmeier, D., Kramer, J., & Painter-Davis, N. (2026). "Expanding the Global Presence of Research on Criminal Sentencing: Implications for Focal Concerns Theory of Judicial Decision Making." Asian Journal of Criminology.
