= Don Kates =

American lawyer

Don Bernard Kates Jr. (January 26, 1941 – November 1, 2016) was an American lawyer and research fellow with The Independent Institute in Oakland, California, who focused on promoting gun rights. His books include Armed: New Perspectives On Gun Control, Restricting Handguns: The Liberal Skeptics Speak Out, Firearms and Violence: Issues of Public Policy, and The Great American Gun Debate: Essays on Firearms and Violence (with Gary Kleck).

As a civil liberties lawyer he was retained by the National Rifle Association of America to represent gun owners attacking the constitutionality of certain firearms laws. Kates also wrote extensively on criminological issues related to firearms.

Kates grew up in the San Francisco Bay Area and attended Reed College and Yale Law School. After three years of teaching constitutional law, criminal law, and criminal procedure at Saint Louis University School of Law, he returned to San Francisco where he practiced law and wrote on criminology.

From 1967 to 1973, he was married to Carol Ruth Silver, also a gun rights activist.

He was editor of Firearms and Violence: Issues of Public Policy (San Francisco: 1984, Pacific Research Institute) and the Winter 1986 issue of Law & Contemporary Problems. He was author of the entry on the Second Amendment in M. Levy & K. Karst, The Encyclopedia of the American Constitution; "Firearms and Violence: Old Premises, Current Evidence," in T. Gurr (ed.), Violence in America (1989); and "Precautionary Handgun Ownership: Reasonable Choice or Dangerous Delusion," B. Danto (ed.), Gun Control and Criminal Homicide, forthcoming (1990). Kates died on November 1, 2016.

== Bibliography ==
- Armed: New Perspectives on Gun Control (w/ Gary Kleck, gun control, Prometheus Books, 2001) ISBN 1-57392-883-6
- Firearms and Violence: Issues of Public Policy Publisher: Ballinger Publishing Company (May 1984) ISBN 0-88410-922-4, ISBN 978-0-88410-922-8
- The Great American Gun Debate: Essays on Firearms & Violence (w/ Gary Kleck and John K. Lattimer, gun control, Pacific Research Institute, 1997) ISBN 0-936488-39-5
- Restricting Handguns: The Liberal Skeptics Speak Out Publisher: North River Press Publishing Corporation (February 1979) ISBN 0-88427-034-3, ISBN 978-0-88427-034-8
