= William Pridemore =

American criminologist (born 1969)

William Alex Pridemore
- Born: October 14, 1969 (age 56)
- Education: Indiana University; University at Albany, SUNY
- Known for: Work on social structure, alcoholic beverage consumption, and violence
- Awards: 2015 Freda Adler Distinguished Scholar Award from the American Society of Criminology's Division of International Criminology
- Scientific career
- Fields: Criminology
- Institutions: University at Albany, SUNY; Georgia State University; Emory University; Indiana University; University of Georgia

William Alex Pridemore (born October 14, 1969) is an American criminologist who is the Chair of the Department of Sociology at the University of Georgia. He is also an affiliate faculty member at the Rollins School of Public Health at Emory University.

== Education ==
Pridemore received his B.A. and M.A. from Indiana University in criminal justice, after which he received his Ph.D. from the University at Albany in 2000.

== Career ==
Before joining the faculty of the University of Georgia in 2022, he previously served as the Dean of the University at Albany, SUNY's School of Criminal Justice and before that, as distinguished professor at Georgia State University in their Department of Criminal Justice and Criminology for two years. Before that, he was a professor in the department of criminal justice at Indiana University from 2009 to 2013.

== Research ==
Pridemore is known for researching the relationship between social structure, alcohol, and violence. This research has reported a positive relationship between alcohol outlets and rates of assault, which he has also reported can be reduced by higher degrees of social cohesion in neighborhoods. He has also studied anti-abortion violence and the relationship between incarceration and mortality.
