= University at Albany School of Criminal Justice =

Coordinates: 42.6615°N 73.7719°W

The University at Albany, SUNY School of Criminal Justice (SCJ) is a school of the University at Albany, SUNY, offering both undergraduate and graduate programs in criminal justice. It was established in 1968, as a result of the desire of then-New York governor Nelson Rockefeller to create a research and education program centered around the study of crime. It offered the first criminal justice doctoral program in the United States. In 2006, this program was ranked the 2nd best criminology doctoral program in the country by U.S. News & World Report. The current dean is William Pridemore, who also received his Ph.D. from the School in 2000.

== Location ==
The SCJ is located in Draper Hall on the University at Albany's Downtown campus.

== Former deans ==
Former deans of the SCJ are:

- Richard Myren (1968–76)
- Vincent I. O'Leary (1976–77)
- Donald J. Newman (1977–83)
- Terence Thornberry (1984–88)
- David E. Duffee (1988–95)
- David Bayley (1995–99)
- Dennis P. Rosenbaum (1999-2000)
- Julie Horney (2002–09)
- Alan Lizotte (2010–15)
