= John Cramer =

John Cramer may refer to:

- John Cramer (American politician) (1779–1870), American politician from New York
- John Cramer (priest) (1793–1848), English classical scholar and geographer
- John G. Cramer (born 1934), American physics professor
- John Cramer (Australian politician) (1896–1994), Australian politician from New South Wales
- John Cramer (pole vaulter) (born 1941), American pole vaulter, 1961–1963 All-American for the Washington Huskies track and field team

== See also ==
- Johann Cramer (disambiguation)
- John Kramer (disambiguation)
