= Don Gottfredson =

American criminologist

- Born: Don Martin Gottfredson; September 25, 1926; Sacramento, California
- Died: June 23, 2002 (aged 75); Sacramento, California
- Education: University of California, Berkeley; Claremont Graduate University
- Spouse: Betty Gottfredson
- Children: Eric Gottfredson; Gary Gottfredson; Michael Gottfredson; Ronald Gottfredson; Stephen Gottfredson
- Scientific career
- Fields: Criminology; Psychology
- Institutions: Rutgers University
- Thesis: Organization in recall (1959)

Don Martin Gottfredson (September 25, 1926 – June 23, 2002) was an American criminologist who was the founding dean of the School of Criminal Justice at Rutgers University. At the time of his death in 2002, he was the Richard J. Hughes Professor Emeritus of Criminal Justice at Rutgers. The Criminal Justice Library at Rutgers was renamed the Don M. Gottfredson Library of Criminal Justice in his memory in 2003.

== Biography ==
Gottfredson was born on September 25, 1926, in Sacramento, California. He received his undergraduate degree in psychology from the University of California, Berkeley in 1951, followed by a Ph.D. from Claremont Graduate School in 1959. Before joining the faculty at Rutgers, he worked at the National Council on Crime and Delinquency, where he was the first research director from 1965 to 1973. He joined Rutgers as the founding dean of their School of Criminal Justice in 1973, and remained in that position until 1986. He served as president of the American Society of Criminology in 1987. He died in Sacramento on June 23, 2002, after developing an illness.

Professional and academic associations
Preceded by Lloyd Ohlin	President of the American Society of Criminology; 1987	Succeeded by William Chambliss
