= David Bordua =

American sociologist

David Joseph Bordua
- Education: University of Connecticut (A.B., 1950; A.M., 1952), Harvard University (Ph.D., 1957)
- Scientific career
- Fields: Sociology
- Workplaces: University of Illinois at Urbana–Champaign
- Thesis: Authoritarianism and intolerance: a study of high school students (1957)
- Notable students: Gary Kleck

David Joseph Bordua is an American sociologist and emeritus professor of sociology at the University of Illinois at Urbana–Champaign. He retired from the University of Illinois between September 1, 1993, and August 30, 1994, after 31 years on the faculty there. While at the University of Illinois, he studied public opinion on handgun bans in Massachusetts and California.

== Education and career ==
Bordua received his Ph.D. from Harvard University in 1957. From 1955 to 1963, he taught sociology at the University of Michigan, where he was promoted from instructor to assistant professor in 1958. For one year (1962–1963), he was a fellow at the Center for Advanced Study in the Behavioral Sciences.
