= Meda Chesney-Lind =

Meda Chesney-Lind is a US feminist, criminologist, and an advocate for girls and women who come in contact with the criminal justice system in Hawaii.

== Overview ==
Chesney-Lind works to find alternatives to women's incarceration and is an advocate for humanitarian solutions within the Hawaiian criminal justice system. She focuses on teaching courses on girls' delinquency and women's crime, issues of girls' programming and women's imprisonment, youth gangs, the sociology of gender, and the victimization of women and girls. Over much of the past two decades, her focus has been on improvement of the Hawaiian correctional system through producing articles for newspapers, books, and journals, as well as working with community-based agencies and giving talks to local organizations and legislators. She has also been credited with helping to direct national attention to services for delinquent girls.

== Early life ==
Meda Chesney was born in Woodward, Oklahoma, in 1947 and was the oldest of four children. She grew up in Maryland and moved to Portland, Oregon at the age of 16. She graduated valedictorian from high school in 1965. She then attended Whitman College where she met Ian Lind. They married in 1969 and moved to his home in Hawaii.

== Education ==
Chesney-Lind received her B.A. in 1969 from Whitman College and both her M.A. (1971) and Ph.D. (1977) from the University of Hawaiʻi at Mānoa.

She is an adjunct professor at the University of Illinois at Chicago, professor emerita of the Department of Women's, Gender and Sexuality Studies University of Hawaiʻi at Mānoa, and a senior research fellow at Portland State University.

== Awards ==
Chesney-Lind has received a number of awards including;

- The University of Hawaii Board Of Regents' Medal for Excellence in Research
- In 1996, the American Society of Criminology named her a Fellow.
- The Academy of Criminal Justice Sciences' Bruce Smith, Sr. Award
- The Distinguished Scholar Award from the Women and Crime Division of the American Society of Criminology
- The Division of Critical Criminology's "Major Achievement Award"
- The Herbert Block Award for service to the society and the profession from the American Society of Criminology
- The Donald Cressey Award from the National Council on Crime and Delinquency in 1997 for her outstanding academic contribution to the field of criminology.
