= John H. Kramer =

American criminologist

John H. Kramer (born 1943) is an American criminologist. He is an emeritus professor of sociology and criminology at Pennsylvania State University (Penn State), where he was a professor from 1973 until his retirement in 2015. He also served as executive director of the Pennsylvania Commission on Sentencing from 1979 to 1998, and as staff director for the United States Sentencing Commission from 1996 to 1998.

== Education ==
Kramer received his Ph.D. in sociology from the University of Iowa.

== Honors and awards ==
In 2014, Kramer received the Justice Policy Innovator Award from the Academy of Criminal Justice Sciences. In 2016, the John Kramer Professorship in Criminology was created in his honor at the Penn State College of the Liberal Arts. Also in 2016, he received the American Society of Criminology's Lifetime Achievement Award.

== Selected publications ==
- Kramer, John H.; Ulmer, Jeffrey T. (2002). "Downward Departures for Serious Violent Offenders: Local Court "Corrections" to Pennsylvania's Sentencing Guidelines". Criminology. 40 (4): 897–932. doi:10.1111/j.1745-9125.2002.tb00977.x. ISSN 0011-1384.
- Steffensmeier, Darrell; Ulmer, Jeffery; Kramer, John (1998). "The Interaction of Race, Gender, and Age in Criminal Sentencing: The Punishment Cost of Being Young, Black, and Male". Criminology. 36 (4): 763–798. doi:10.1111/j.1745-9125.1998.tb01265.x. ISSN 1745-9125.
- Ulmer, Jeffery T.; Kramer, John H. (May 1998). "The Use and Transformation of Formal Decision-Making Criteria: Sentencing Guidelines, Organizational Contexts, and Case Processing Strategies". Social Problems. 45 (2): 248–267. doi:10.2307/3097246.
- Kramer, John H.; Ulmer, Jeffrey T. (2014). Sentencing Guidelines: Lessons from Pennsylvania. Boulder: Lynne Rienner Publishers. ISBN 978-1-58826-599-9.
- Ulmer, Jeffery T.; Light, Michael T.; Kramer, John H. (2011). "Racial Disparity in the Wake of the Booker/Fanfan Decision: An Alternative Analysis to the USSC's 2010 Report". Criminology & Public Policy. 10: 1077.
- Warner, Tara D.; Kramer, John H. (2009-01-01). "Closing the Revolving Door?: Substance Abuse Treatment as an Alternative to Traditional Sentencing for Drug-Dependent Offenders". Criminal Justice and Behavior. 36 (1): 89–109. doi:10.1177/0093854808326743. ISSN 0093-8548.
- Ulmer, Jeffery T.; Kramer, John H.; Zajac, Gary (2020-07-28). "The Race of Defendants and Victims in Pennsylvania Death Penalty Decisions: 2000–2010". Justice Quarterly. 37 (5): 955–983. doi:10.1080/07418825.2019.1679865. ISSN 0741-8825.
- Kramer, John H.; Lubitz, Robin L. (1985-10-01). "Pennsylvania's Sentencing Reform: The Impact of Commission-Established Guidelines". Crime & Delinquency. 31 (4): 481–500. doi:10.1177/0011128785031004002. ISSN 0011-1287.
- Kramer, John H. (2009). "Mandatory Sentencing Guidelines: The Framing of Justice". Criminology & Public Policy. 8: 313.
