= Mona Lynch =

American criminologist

- Education: University of California, Santa Cruz; Stanford University
- Known for: Sociology of law
- Awards: 2016 Stanton Wheeler Mentorship Award from the Law and Society Association
- Scientific career
- Fields: Criminology; Sociology
- Institutions: University of California, Irvine
- Patrons: National Science Foundation
- Thesis: Defendant/Victim Race, Juror Comprehension, and Capital Sentencing: An Experimental Approach (1997)

Mona Pauline Lynch is an American criminologist and Professor of Criminology, Law and Society and Law at the University of California, Irvine, where she is also co-director of the Center in Law, Society and Culture.

She has also been the co-editor-in-chief of Punishment & Society since 2015. An expert on drug laws in the United States, she is the author of the 2016 book Hard Bargains: The Coercive Power of Drug Laws in Federal Court, which discusses the use of drug laws by federal prosecutors to coerce defendants into taking plea bargains.
