= Gary Kleck =

American criminologist

Gary David Kleck
- Born: March 2, 1951 (age 75); Lombard, Illinois
- Education: University of Illinois
- Awards: Michael J. Hindelang Award
- Scientific career
- Fields: Criminology
- Workplaces: Florida State University
- Thesis: Homicide, capital punishment, and gun ownership: an aggregate analysis of U.S. homicide trends from 1947 to 1976 (1979)

Gary Kleck (born March 2, 1951) is a criminologist and the David J. Bordua Professor Emeritus of Criminology at Florida State University.

== Early life and education ==
Kleck was born in Lombard, Illinois, to William and Joyce Kleck. He attended Glenbard East High School before enrolling in the University of Illinois Urbana-Champaign, where he received his BA (1973), MA (1975), and PhD (1979), all in Sociology.

== Criminology ==
Kleck has done numerous studies of the effects of guns on death and injury in crimes, on suicides, and gun accidents, the impact of gun control laws on rates of violence, the frequency and effectiveness of defensive gun use by crime victims, patterns of gun ownership, why people support gun control, and "the myth of big-time gun trafficking."

In addition to his work on guns and violence, Kleck has done research concluding that increasing levels of punishment will not increase the deterrent effects of punishment, and that capital punishment does not have any measurable effect on homicide rates.

=== Defensive gun use research and debate ===
Kleck conducted a national survey in 1994 (the National Self-Defense Survey) and, extrapolating from the 5,000 households surveyed, estimated that in 1993 there were approximately 2.5 million incidents of defensive gun use (DGU – the use of guns for self-protection), compared to about 0.5 million gun crimes as estimated by the National Crime Victimization Survey.

David Hemenway at the Harvard School of Public Health Injury Control Research Center, said that Kleck's estimates are difficult to reconcile with comparable crime statistics, are subject to a high degree of sampling error, and that "because of differences in coverage and potential response errors, what exactly these surveys measure remains uncertain; mere repetition does not eliminate bias." Kleck and Gertz responded to this criticism saying: "It is obvious to us that David Hemenway had no intention of producing a balanced, intellectually serious assessment of our estimates of defensive gun use (DGU). Instead, his critique serves the narrow political purpose of 'getting the estimate down,' for the sake of advancing the gun control cause."

Kleck asserts errors in his critics' claims that his survey's estimates of defensive gun uses linked with specific crime types, or that involved a wounding of the offender, are implausibly large compared to estimates of the total numbers of such crimes. The total number of nonfatal gunshot woundings, whether medically treated or not, is unknown, and no meaningful estimates can be derived from his survey regarding defensive gun uses linked with specific crime types, or that involved wounding the offender, because the sample sizes are too small. The fact that some crime-specific estimates derived from the Kleck survey are implausibly large is at least partly a reflection of the small samples on which they are based - no more than 196 cases. Kleck states that his estimate of total defensive gun uses was based on nearly 5,000 cases. Thus, he argues, the implausible character of some estimates of small subsets of defensive gun uses is not a valid criticism of whether estimates of the total number of defensive gun uses are implausible or too high.

Marvin Wolfgang, who was acknowledged in 1994 by the British Journal of Criminology as ″the most influential criminologist in the English-speaking world″, commented on Kleck's research concerning defensive gun use:

I am as strong a gun-control advocate as can be found among the criminologists in this country. [...] The Kleck and Gertz study impresses me for the caution the authors exercise and the elaborate nuances they examine methodologically. I do not like their conclusions that having a gun can be useful, but I cannot fault their methodology. They have tried earnestly to meet all objections in advance and have done exceedingly well.

A 1997 National Institute of Justice publication claimed that it is virtually impossible to reconcile Kleck's estimates and Kleck-like estimates to the amount of crime that actually occurs in the United States. Kleck, however, counter-argued that this conclusion was the product of logical errors and a mistake by the authors in which they made an inappropriate apples and oranges comparison. A study by Philip Cook and Jens Ludwig published in 1997 performed the same survey with a correction for false positives and obtained estimates within the margin of sampling error of the Kleck & Gertz estimates, and that were far larger than estimates derived from the NCVS. The NCVS, however, never specifically asks respondents about defensive gun use, and its estimates have never been confirmed by any other survey. In contrast, at least 21 consecutive professionally conducted national surveys have yielded estimates in 1–3 million range, many times higher than those derived from the NCVS.

== Impact ==
In 1993, Kleck won the Michael J. Hindelang Award from the American Society of Criminology for his book Point Blank: Guns and Violence in America (Aldine de Gruyter, 1991). He has testified before Congress and state legislatures on gun control proposals. His research was cited in the Supreme Court's landmark District of Columbia v. Heller decision, which struck down the D.C. handgun ban and held that the Second Amendment protects an individual right to keep and bear arms.

== Bibliography ==
- Kleck, Gary (1997). Targeting Guns: Firearms and Their Control. Routledge. ISBN 9780202305691.
- Kleck, Gary; Kates, Don B. (2001). Armed: New Perspectives on Gun Control. Prometheus Books. ISBN 9781573928830.
- Kleck, Gary (2005). Point Blank: Guns and Violence in America. Routledge. ISBN 9780202307626.

== See also ==
- Stephen Halbrook
- Don Kates
- John Lott
- James D. Wright
