= John Krämer =

German Carthusian writer

John Krämer (known also as Institor, a Latin form of his surname) was a German Carthusian writer. Born about the end of the fourteenth century, he must have died between 1437 and 1440, as a manuscript of the Carthusian monastery of Memmingen speaks of the gift made to it by Krämer in 1437, and the general chapter of the Carthusian Order held in 1440 mentions his death.

He entered Buxheim Charterhouse, in the Diocese of Augsburg, Bavaria; he is sometimes called John of Buxheim.

== Works ==
His works include two treatises published by Bernard Pez in his Bibliotheca ascetica. Typically for the Carthusians of the fifteenth century, they show a rigorous asceticism, only a little qualified (under the influence of Denis the Carthusian).

One of these is entitled "Breviloquium anirni cujuslibet religiosi reformativum"; it consists of two parts. In the first part the author teaches a good religious divers means and practices which he should observe in order to remain a faithful Christian, to acquire, on earth, the grace of perfection and, in heaven, ever-lasting happiness. In the second part, by a quaint allegory, he puts the religious on his guard against the faults of monastic life which are represented by twenty birds of prey, the eagle, the vulture, the hawk, the owl, etc., whose characteristics and manners he describes. Though written in an uncultured style, the book was much read in the monasteries of the Middle Ages.

The subject of Krämer's second book is against anger, as indicated by its title, "Tractatus exhortativus ad evitandam malam iram".

An unpublished treatise, "De Objectionibus bibliae", has also been sometimes attributed to Krämer, but without sufficient warrant.
