= Criminology (journal) =

- Discipline: Criminology, penology, criminal justice, cybercrime, deviance
- Language: English
- Edited by: Volkan Topalli and Thomas Loughran

Publication details
- History: 1963-present
- Publisher: Wiley-Blackwell on behalf of the American Society of Criminology (United States)
- Frequency: Quarterly
- Impact factor: 6.73 (2022)

Standard abbreviations
- ISO 4: Criminology

Indexing
- CODEN: CRINYA
- ISSN: 0011-1384 (print); 1745-9125 (web)
- LCCN: 76648723
- OCLC no.: 803672375

Links
- Journal homepage; Online access; Online archive

Criminology is a quarterly peer-reviewed academic journal published by Wiley-Blackwell on behalf of the American Society of Criminology. The editors-in-chief are Volkan Topalli (Andrew Young School of Policy Studies) and Thomas Loughran (University of South Florida). The journal covers research in criminology, penology, cybercrime, deviance and criminal justice.

The journal was established in 1963 under the title Criminologica, and assumed its current title in 1970. According to the Journal Citation Reports, the journal has a 2022 impact factor of 6.73.
