= Gary Gottfredson =

American psychologist

- Born: Gary Don Gottfredson; September 4, 1947 (age 78); Sonora, California
- Education: University of California, Berkeley (BA); Johns Hopkins University (MA, PhD)
- Known for: Career assessment
- Spouses: Linda Gottfredson (m. 1967–1979) Denise Claire Ruff (m. 1980)
- Awards: 1989 John L. Holland Award for Outstanding Achievement in Career and Personality Research from the Society for Counseling Psychology
- Scientific career
- Fields: Psychology
- Institutions: Johns Hopkins University; University of Maryland–College Park
- Thesis: Using a psychological classification of occupations to describe work, careers, and cultural change (1976)

Gary Don Gottfredson (born September 4, 1947) is an American psychologist and professor emeritus in the Department of Counseling, Higher Education, and Special Education at the University of Maryland–College Park. His research has focused on the psychology of career counseling and assessment, among other topics. He is known for his work with John L. Holland on the development of various assessment tools commonly used by counseling psychologists, such as the Position Classification Inventory.

== Early life and education ==
Gottfredson was born on September 4, 1947, in Sonora, California. He received his B.A. from the University of California, Berkeley, in psychology in 1969, followed by an M.A. and Ph.D. from Johns Hopkins University in 1975 and 1976, respectively.

== Career ==
Gottfredson was a research scientist at Johns Hopkins University's Center for Social Organization of Schools from 1977 to 1985. He also served as an assistant professor of psychology at Johns Hopkins University from 1977 to 1981, and as an associate professor there from 1981 to 1988. In 1988, he promoted to full professor of both psychology and sociology at Johns Hopkins. He remained on the faculty at Johns Hopkins until 1993, when he left to become president of Gottfredson Associates, Inc.. In 2003, he joined the University of Maryland–College Park as a professor in the Department of Counseling and Personnel Services. He became a professor in the university's Department of Counseling, Higher Education, and Special Education in 2012, and retired as Professor Emeritus there in 2013.

== Honors and awards ==
Gottfredson is a fellow of the American Psychological Association, the Association for Psychological Science, and the Academy of Experimental Criminology. He also received the John Holland Award for Outstanding Achievement in Career and Personality Research from the Society for Counseling Psychology.

== Personal life ==
Gottfredson met Linda Howarth while they were both attending the University of California, Davis. They married in 1967 and transferred to the University of California, Berkeley together soon afterward. They both received their undergraduate degrees from Berkeley in psychology in 1969, and they remained married until their divorce in 1979. Gary Gottfredson went on to marry another psychologist, Denise Claire Ruff, in 1980.
