= Punishment & Society =

- Discipline: Criminology
- Language: English
- Edited by: Kelly Hannah-Moffat, Mona Lynch

Publication details
- History: 1999-present
- Publisher: SAGE Publications
- Frequency: 5/year
- Impact factor: 2.040 (2016)

Standard abbreviations
- ISO 4: Punishm. Soc.

Indexing
- ISSN: 1462-4745 (print); 1741-3095 (web)
- LCCN: sn99017542
- OCLC no.: 42208145

Links
- Journal homepage; Online access; Online archive

Punishment & Society is a peer-reviewed academic journal that covers the fields of criminology and penology. The journal's editors-in-chief are Kelly Hannah-Moffat (University of Toronto, Canada) and Mona Lynch (University of California, Irvine, USA). It was established in 1999 and is currently published by SAGE Publications.

== Abstracting and indexing ==
Punishment & Society is abstracted and indexed in Scopus and the Social Sciences Citation Index. According to the Journal Citation Reports, its 2016 impact factor is 2.040, ranking it 14 out of 58 journals in the category "Criminology and Penology".
