= American Society of Criminology =

International organization based in the U.S.

- Logo since 2018
- Abbreviation: ASC
- Formation: December 30, 1941; 84 years ago
- Headquarters: Ohio State University, Columbus, Ohio
- Affiliations: American Association for the Advancement of Science; International Society of Criminology
- Website: www.asc41.com

The American Society of Criminology (ASC) is an international organization based on the campus of Ohio State University whose members focus on the study of crime and delinquency. It aims to grow and disseminate scholarly research, with members working in many disciplines and on different levels in the fields of criminal justice and criminology. The Society and its members also seek to strengthen the role of research in the formulation of public policy. To further these goals, the Society holds an annual meeting that attracts some 4,000+ attendees from roughly 40 countries.

== History ==
The society traces its history back to a meeting of seven men at the home of retired Berkeley Police Department chief and criminology professor August Vollmer on December 30, 1941. The meeting was said to be "for the purpose of furthering college police training and standardizing police training curricula". Establishing itself as the National Association of College Police Training Officials (NACPTO), the group elected Vollmer, who was due to be deployed into the military following the attack on Pearl Harbor, as President-Emeritus and Orlando W. Wilson as president.

After the end of World War II, the NACPTO underwent a reorganization in 1946 and became known as the Society for the Advancement of Criminology (SAC). In June 1950, the society became affiliated with the American Association for the Advancement of Science, and in December of that year, was accepted into the International Society of Criminology. The SAC officially changed its name to the American Society of Criminology in November 1957.

== Divisions ==
The Society has a number of divisions. They have been established at different times over its history, from the Division of International Criminology established in 1981 to the Division of Public Opinion and Policy established in 2021.

== Publications ==
The Society publishes a newsletter, The Criminologist, and two journals. The journal Criminology has been published since 1963. It is generally regarded as the leading journal in the field, and is distributed worldwide. The journal Criminology & Public Policy has been published since 2001.

Many of the Society divisions also publish journals and newsletters.

== See also ==
- Crime in the United States
- Public criminology
