= Strain theory (sociology) =

Theory regarding causes of crime

In the fields of sociology and criminology, strain theory is a theoretical perspective that aims to explain the relationship between social structure, social values or goals, and crime. Strain theory was originally introduced by Robert King Merton (1949,1938 for its first version), and argues that society's dominant cultural values and social structure causes strain, which may encourage citizens to commit crimes. Following on the work of Émile Durkheim's theory of anomie, strain theory has been advanced by Robert King Merton (1938), Albert K. Cohen (1955), Richard Cloward, Lloyd Ohlin (1960), Neil Smelser (1963), Robert Agnew (1992), Steven Messner, Richard Rosenfeld (1994) and Jie Zhang (2012).

== Strain Theory ==
Strain theory is a sociological and criminological theory developed in 1938 by Robert K. Merton. The theory states that society puts pressure on individuals to achieve socially accepted goals (such as the American Dream), even though they lack the means to do so. This leads to strain, which may lead individuals to commit crimes, like selling drugs or becoming involved in prostitution as a means to gain financial security.

Strain could be:

1. Structural: this refers to the macro-level processes at the societal level which filter down and affect how the individual perceives their needs, i.e. if particular social structures are inherently inadequate or there is inadequate regulation, this may change the individual's perceptions as to means and opportunities; or
2. Individual: this refers to the frustration and strain experienced by an individual as they look for ways to satisfy their needs, i.e. if the goals of a society become significant to an individual, actually achieving them may become more important than how they achieved the goal.

=== Merton's Theory ===
Robert King Merton was an American sociologist who argued that the social structure of a society can encourage deviance to a large degree. Merton's theory borrows from Émile Durkheim's theory of anomie, which argues that industrialization would fundamentally alter the function of society; ultimately, causing a breakdown of social ties, social norms, and the social order. Merton believed that society's emphasis on certain socially accepted goals put pressure on people to conform in order to achieve success. His theory was developed largely due to the social and economic circumstances occurring in the United States during the early 1900s. Robert Merton's Strain Theory stems from a fundamental question that he posed as to why the rates of deviance were so different among different societies. Merton's theories of social structure and anomie sought to explain how a society's specific social structures can pressure certain members of society toward nonconformist or deviant behavior. He thought that there could be deviance in societies where the cultural definition of success and the proper means to achieve said goals are incongruent. He found that the United States is prime example of a society where increased levels of deviance relate to the high social value of achieving success, usually monetary, but there are contradictions to the proper means of achieving such success. Success is often valued more for its outcome than the means for achieving it, leading to a preference for convenient methods over traditional, ethical methods. Merton developed strain theory to explore how an extreme emphasis on the cultural goal of success and restricted access to opportunities to institutionalized means for achieving success leads to deviance.

Merton outlined five ways that individuals may respond to the strain between their cultural goals and the opportunities available to them. These are commonly referred to as Merton's typology of individual adaptation. Each type of individual adaptation is defined by its acceptance or rejection of the cultural goals (monetary success), and acceptance or rejection of the socially acceptable means to achieve the goal (e.g. high socioeconomic status, education, high-income job opportunities).

1. Conformity: conformity is the most common response to cultural goals and institutional means.
  1. individuals who conform accept and value the cultural goals, as well as the approved means. They pursue cultural goals through the socially approved means, and do not experience strain.
2. Innovation: individuals who accept and value the society's goals, but reject the accepted means to achieve the goal. These people accept the goals, but create their own unapproved means for achieving them, usually because they do not have access to the institutional means.
  1. Merton referred to this response as the most related to deviance because of innovators' "illegitimate adaptation" to strain. Innovators often resort to illegitimate means, to obtain the culturally approved goals (e.g. wealth).
  2. Example: organized crime, stealing, or selling drugs to achieve financial security.
3. Ritualism: individuals adopt the accepted means so severely that it becomes a ritualistic practice, meaning that they no longer value the cultural goal (wealth), yet they still blindly conform to the means as an end in and of themselves.
4. Retreatism: is the least common response to strain.
  1. Retreatists are people who had previously accepted cultural goals and the institutional means but eventually abandon both the goals and the means. Retreatists still feel a moral obligation to use the institutional means, but their acceptance of the cultural goal pressures them to pursue the goal illegitimately. These conflicting values lead the individual to reject both the goal and the means, and instead find a way to escape the requirements of society.
    1. Example: substance abuse, social isolation
5. Rebellion: Usually due to frustration, oppression, or marginalization, these individuals reject the cultural goals and the accepted means to achieve the goals. Instead, they attempt to introduce new cultural goals and new institutionalized means, ultimately aimed at producing a new social order.
  1. Example: social movements, leftist movements, and any social change aimed at creating a society with more modest and equally accessible goals, as well as equal opportunity means.

In addition, Merton saw how minority groups had a harder time acquiring a good education, and if they could, they had a harder time acquiring a respectable living; yet the same high standard for success is enforced on everyone despite the fact that some people do not have the means to satisfy such high standards. Merton notes that crime and deviance are a "normal" response in a social structure that has adopted the high value goal of monetary success, but where opportunities for conventional or legitimate means of attaining success are blocked. For example, when wages are low, people may turn to illicit activities, such as prostitution, drug dealing, or gambling to achieve financial success.

British Sociologist and Criminologist Jock Young drew on Merton's theory in his book The Exclusive Society: Social Exclusion, Crime and Difference in Late Modernity in 1999. Analysing crime from both a cultural and structural point of view, he argued in the structural sense that the dismantling of the welfare state in conjunction with the widening disparities between the rich and poor has served to further exclude disadvantaged groups. Because contemporary consumer capitalism places a greater than ever emphasis on conspicuous consumption and material success, this thus intensified feelings of deprivation experienced by the less successful.

== Derived Theories ==
=== General strain theory ===
General strain theory (GST) is a sociological and criminological theory developed in 1992 by Robert Agnew. Agnew believed that Merton's theory was too vague in nature and did not account for criminal activity which did not involve financial gain. The core idea of general strain theory is that strain causes people to have negative emotional responses, negative emotions that people need to be able to cope with. Though, if people do not have access to legitimate or noncriminal coping, strain may lead them to commit crime in order to cope. One of the key principles of this theory is negative emotion as the motivator for crime. The theory was developed to conceptualize the full range of sources in society where strain possibly comes from, rather than Merton's focus on monetary goals and proper means. GST also focuses on the perspective of goals for status, expectations, and class. Examples of General Strain Theory are people who use illegal drugs to make themselves feel better, or a student assaulting his peers to end the harassment they caused.

GST introduces 3 main sources of strain or negative relationships such as:

1. Loss of positive stimuli (death of family or friend)
2. Presentation of negative stimuli (physical and verbal assaults)
3. The inability to reach a desired goal.

=== Institutional Anomie theory ===
Institutional anomie theory (IAT) is a macro-level criminological theory developed in 1994 by Steven Messner and Richard Rosenfeld.

Messner and Rosenfeld agree with Merton's view that American culture overemphasizes financial success, and expand on his view by arguing that the economy's supremacy over other social institutions and the cultural values of the American Dream create high crime rates.

Messner and Rosenfeld argue that in American culture economic success is valued above everything else, which socializes Americans to value:

1. achievement orientation: gaining success through hard work and determination
2. individualism: focus on monetary success rather than who you are as a person and gaining success through your own hard work, 'no free handouts'
3. universalism: the idea that all members of a society are socialized to value monetary success, and all members have equal opportunity to attain success as long as they work hard
4. the 'fetishism of money'" (Messner and Rosenfeld 2001:68): a specific strain of materialism, US obsession with wealth as the primary marker of success or worth

These values are also necessary to perpetuate the cultural importance and value of economic gain. This imbalance between economy and all other social institutions affects society in a few important ways: First, with economic gain as the most important goal, economic pressure becomes more obvious and promotes action. Second, the diminished value of social institutions, such as family and education, which would usually help to reduce crime rates and provide legitimate opportunities become far less effective.

IAT also helps to explain the motivation for white-collar crime, while Merton does not. As the already wealthy and powerful would not experience legitimate opportunity strain, IAT posits that success is open-ended. Even members who are already monetarily successful are driven by the constant pressure to acquire evermore money.

Derived from Merton's Strain Theory, IAT expands on the macro levels of the theory. IAT's focus centers on the cultural goal of wealth as a determinant of crime.

=== Illegitimate Opportunities theory ===
Illegitimate opportunities is a sociological theory developed in 1960 by Richard Cloward and Lloyd Ohlin. The theory states that crimes result from a high number of illegitimate opportunities and not from a lack of legitimate ones. The theory was created from Merton's strain theory to help address juvenile delinquency.

=== Role strain theory ===
The theory of "role strain", developed by sociologist William J. Goode in 1960, states that social institutions are supported and operated by role relationships. Due to these role relationships that individuals may feel "role strain", or difficulty fulfilling their sociological duties in the relationship. It is through this "role strain" that social action and social structure are maintained. With these relationships, come social obligations that members of that society are required to follow, which people are usually not forced to fulfill. In order for the society to continue existing, these obligations must be fulfilled at the volition of the individuals in it, which the theory states is what most people are inclined to do. Due to the fact that there is no force involved in maintaining these role relationships, there will be individuals who can not, or will not, conform to these societal expectations.

In addition, the individuals within the society are not bound to one role relationship. In fact, all individuals will be part of multiple role relationships. Possession of multiple relationships can account for the conflicts of interest often faced in social settings. According to Goode, however, due to these multiple relationships, an individual will almost always have a total amount of role obligations that demand more than what the individual can give, whether it is in terms of time, emotional favor, or material resources. This can give rise to "role strain", which can lead the individual to attempting to fulfill socially acceptable goals in means that may not be socially acceptable (as explained in general strain theory).

While the theory of role strain attempts to attribute the maintenance of society to role relationships, Goode also acknowledges that the theory does not account for the existence of more complex social settings, such as that of urban society. The theory of role strain does not account for several aspects of urban life, such as the fact that some individuals accept absolutely none of the society's central values, the fact that individuals vary in their emotional commitment to these societal values, how these role relationships change when individuals go through a change in social position, or how these relationships hold up during times of crisis.

== Other strain theorists ==
=== Robert Agnew ===
In the year 1992, Robert Agnew asserted that strain theory could be central in explaining crime and deviance, but that it needed revision so that it was not tied to social class or cultural variables, but re-focused on norms. To this end, Agnew proposed a general strain theory that is neither structural nor interpersonal but rather individual and emotional, paying special attention to an individual's immediate social environment. He argued that an individual's actual or anticipated failure to achieve positively valued goals, actual or anticipated removal of positively valued stimuli, and actual or anticipated presentation of negative stimuli all result in strain.

Anger and frustration confirm negative relationships. The resulting behavior patterns will often be characterized by more than their share of unilateral action because an individual will have a natural desire to avoid unpleasant rejections, and these unilateral actions (especially when antisocial) will further contribute to an individual's alienation from society. If particular rejections are generalized into feelings that the environment is unsupportive, more strongly negative emotions may motivate the individual to engage in crime. This is most likely to be true for younger individuals, and Agnew suggested that research focus on the magnitude, recency, duration, and clustering of such strain-related events to determine whether a person copes with strain in a criminal or conforming manner. Temperament, intelligence, interpersonal skills, self-efficacy, the presence of conventional social support, and the absence of association with antisocial (e.g., criminally inclined) age and status peers are chief among the factors Agnew identified as beneficial.

=== Jie Zhang and the Strain Theory of Suicide ===
In recent years, Zhang and colleagues have argued that socio-psychological strain factors were more indicative than mental disorders in suicide ideation and risk. Zhang suggests that these mental strains, manifesting as an intense internal frustration and psychological suffering, develop from competing pressures in an individual's life, and identified four sources that precede suicide in a study on suicides in rural China: 1) value strain from differential values, 2) aspirational strain from the discrepancy between reality and aspiration, 3) deprivation strain from relative deprivation, including poverty, and 4) coping strain from not being able to cope in the face of crisis. The theory's particular strength is that, unlike many other theories on suicide, and strain, it does not restrict itself to one domain of possible risk factors; such as the social, psychiatric, or psychological.

This strain theory of suicide developed from Durkheim's notion of anomie, and the work of Merton and Agnew on strain theory. Although mental illness on its own is not a definite risk factor for suicide to be considered a cause, their research suggests when it goes along with these strains, the risk is exponentially higher. On the other hand, the relationship between suicide and strain may also be moderated by social regulation, –integration, and psychological factors such as personality. Durkheim's anomie contributes to strain risk, so the strain theory on suicide agrees with the suggestion that a person well integrated into a social institution (family, religion, employment, school) may be at lower risk of suicide, even if confronted with a major strain, whereas a person without such integration might be more negatively affected.

The Four Sources of Strain for Suicide

A strain is made up of at least two pressures or variables, similar to the formation of cognitive dissonance. Zhang proposes four types of strain that precede a suicide, each deriving from a particular source. These are:

==== Differential Values ====
'Value strain' is the result of two social values or beliefs that conflict and compete in a person's daily life and internalised value system. The more equally important the two conflicting values, the greater the strain. An example Zhang gives is a second-generation immigrant in the US who must abide by the ethnic rules of their family while also adapting to American culture at school and with peers. Another example can be found in developing countries where the values of traditional collectivism compete with modern individualism.

==== Reality vs Aspiration ====
"Aspirational strain" is the result of a discrepancy between an individual's aspirations or goals, and the reality of their daily life that prevents them from achieving their aspirations. An example would be a young adult moving to a large city, expecting to become successful and live an affluent lifestyle, only to find that the means to achieve this might not be equally available due to their social status. The misleading notion of "work hard, play hard" may also cause aspirational strain, as a person might work two jobs but still won't be able to afford a comfortable lifestyle. The larger the discrepancy between aspiration and reality, the greater the strain.

==== Relative Deprivation ====
The notion of 'if everyone is poor no one is' might explain why in cases where a person of low socioeconomic standing is surrounded by those of similar standing, the strain is not as great (although the stress may very well be present). This contrasts with cases where the individual sees that those around them are much better off, causing them to feel deprived and miserable, resulting in deprivation strain. This type of strain is more common in economically polarized societies where the rich and poor live geographically close to one another, although social media has also done much to create a sense of relative deprivation, especially amongst the youth.

==== Deficient Coping ====
'Coping strain' occurs when, in times of crisis, a person is not able to sufficiently cope, most commonly due to deficient or inappropriate coping methods. The crisis might be a daily occurrence or a major event, and although many might cope effectively and not experience strain, there are those who cannot manage the strain. Psychological wellbeing may come into play here, as conditions like anxiety or depression may lower (or speak towards) a person's difficulty coping. Examples include the loss of a loved one, sudden financial loss, bullying, and being fired. Being inexperienced in dealing with crises might increase the strain, which could be linked to the rates of suicide amongst teens and young adults.

== Criticism ==
Strain theory has received several criticisms, such as:

1. Strain theory best applies only to the lower class as they struggle with limited resources to obtain their goals.
2. Strain theory fails to explain white collar crime, the perpetrator of whom have many opportunities to achieve through legal and legitimate means.
3. Strain theory fails to explain crimes based in gender inequality.
4. Merton deals with individuals forms of responses instead of group activity which crime involves.
5. Merton's theory is not very critical of the social structure that he says generate the strains.
6. Strain theory neglects the inter- and intra-personal aspect of crime.
7. Strain theories assumed that strain caused criminality, though this assumption does not apply to people who experience strain but do not react or cope via criminal or delinquent behavior.
8. Though previous general strain theories seem to support a relationship between strain and criminal behavior, they do not address the possible conditioning influences which affect whether or not an individual would react to strain with delinquency or criminal behavior.
9. Strain theory has weak empirical evidence supporting it.

== Studies ==
Strain theory was tested following its development. Most of these test examined ideal goals such as occupational goals and individual expectations, which would most ideally lead to crimes if not achieved under rule of strain theory. However, most of the research found that this was not the case. An example of these studies was a study done by Travis Hirschi in 1969. He analyzes a large body of data on delinquency collected in Western Contra Costa County, California that contrast with strain theory.

In addition to the study done by Hirschi, strain theory was explored in a 2001 study conducted by Jason D. Boardman (and others). The study explored how societal strain and stress can lead to drug use by individuals, in particular how one's neighborhood environment can affect their susceptibility to drug abuse. This study specifically centered around troubled neighborhoods in Detroit, and the results were based on census data taken of these neighborhoods, mainly because this data contained information on each individual resident's use of drugs. From this data, the study found that the more disadvantaged a neighborhood is, the more its residents abuse drugs. The study credited this positive trend to higher levels of stress and fewer available resources. According to strain theory, this lack of resources may compel an individual to abuse drugs to attain the positively valued goal of happiness by using the means that are currently available, which in the case of rough neighborhoods, were drugs.

== See also ==
- Illegitimate opportunity

== Sources and further reading ==
- O'Grady W. (2011). "Crime in Canadian Context." Strain/anomie theory 92–94
- Agnew, R (1992). "Foundation for a General Strain Theory". Criminology. 30 (1): 47–87. doi:10.1111/j.1745-9125.1992.tb01093.x. S2CID 144126837.
- Agnew, R.; White, H. (1992). "An Empirical Test of General Strain Theory". Criminology. 30 (4): 475–99. doi:10.1111/j.1745-9125.1992.tb01113.x.
- Agnew, R. (1997). "The Nature and Determinants of Strain: Another Look at Durkheim and Merton." pp. 27–51 in The Future of Anomie Theory, edited by R. Agnew and N. Passastrain Theory." Advances in Criminological Theory: The Origins of American Criminology, Volume 16, edited by F.T. Cullen, F. Adler, C.L. Johnson, and A.J. Meyer. New Brunswick, NJ: Transaction.
- Akers, R. (2000). Criminological Theories: Introduction, Evaluation, and Application. Los Angeles: Roxbury.
- Cloward, R (1959). "Illegitimate Means, Anomie and Deviant Behavior". American Sociological Review. 24 (2): 164–76. doi:10.2307/2089427. JSTOR 2089427.
- Cloward, R. & Ohlin, L. (1960). Delinquency and Opportunity. NY: Free Press.
- Cohen, A. (1955). Delinquent Boys. NY: Free Press.
- Cohen, A (1965). "The Sociology of the Deviant Act: Anomie Theory and Beyond". American Sociological Review. 30 (1): 5–14. doi:10.2307/2091770. JSTOR 2091770. PMID 14247328.
- Cohen, A (1977). "The Concept of Criminal Organization". British Journal of Criminology. 17 (2): 97–111. doi:10.1093/oxfordjournals.bjc.a046820.
- Dubin, R (1959). "Deviant Behavior and Social Structure: Continuities in Social Theory". American Sociological Review. 24 (2): 147–163. doi:10.2307/2089426. JSTOR 2089426.
- Durkheim, E. (1897/1997). Suicide. NY: Free Press.
- Featherstone, R. & Deflem, M. (2003). "Anomie and Strain: Context and Consequences of Merton's Two Theories." Sociological Inquiry 73(4): 471–489.
- Hirschi, T. (1969). Causes of Delinquency. Berkeley: University of California Press.
- Marwah, Sanjay, and Mathieu Deflem. 2006. "Revisiting Merton: Continuities in the Theory of Anomie-and-Opportunity-Structures." pp. 57–76 in Sociological Theory and Criminological Research: Views from Europe and the United States, ed. M. Deflem. Amsterdam: Elsevier/JAI Press.
- Messner, S & Rosenfeld, R. (1994). Crime and the American Dream. Belmont: Wadsworth.
- Polk, K (1969). "Class, Strain and Rebellion Among Adolescents". Social Problems. 17 (2): 214–24. doi:10.2307/799867. JSTOR 799867.
- Polk, K., & Schafer, W. (eds.). (1972). Schools and Delinquency. Englewood Cliffs, NJ: Prentice-Hall.
- Agnew, Robert. 2006. "General Strain Theory: Current Status and Directions for Further Research." pp. 101–123 in Taking Stock: The Status of Criminological Theory-Advances in Criminological Theory, edited by F. T. Cullen, J. P. Wright, and K. Blevins. New Brunswick, NJ: Transaction.
- Durkheim, Emile. 1951. Suicide: A Study in Sociology. New York: Free Press (Original work published in 1897).
- IOM, (Institute of Medicine). 2002. Reducing suicide: An American imperative. Washington, D.C.: National Academy Press.
- Merton, R.K. 1957. Social Theory and Social Structure, rev. ed. New York: Free Press.
- NIMH. 2003. Research on Reduction and Prevention of Suicidality: National Institute of Mental Health.
- Phillips, Michael R; Yang, Gonghuan; Zhang, Yanping; Wang, L.; Ji, H.; Zhou, M. (2002). "Risk factors for suicide in China: a national case-control psychological autopsy study". The Lancet. 360 (9347): 1728–1736. doi:10.1016/s0140-6736(02)11681-3. PMID 12480425. S2CID 34432323.
- Spitzer, R.L., J.B.W. Williams, M. Gibbon, and A.B. First. 1988. Instruction Manual for the Structured Clinical Interview for DSM-III-R (SCID, 6/1/88 Revision). New York: Biometrics Research Department, New York State Psychiatric Institute.
- Zhang, Jie (2010). "Marriage and Suicide among Chinese Rural Young Women". Social Forces. 89: 311–326. doi:10.1353/sof.2010.0065. S2CID 145275740.
- Zhang, Jie; Dong, Nini; Delprino, Robert; Zhou, Li (2009). "Psychological Strains Found From In-Depth Interviews With 105 Chinese Rural Youth Suicides". Archives of Suicide Research. 13 (2): 185–194. doi:10.1080/13811110902835155. PMC 2715851. PMID 19363755.
- Zhang, Jie and Shenghua Jin. 1998. "Interpersonal relations and suicide ideation in China." Genetic, Social, and General Psychology Monographs 124:79–94.
- Zhang, Jie; Lester, David (2008). "Psychological Tensions Found in Suicide Notes: A Test for the Strain Theory of Suicide". Archives of Suicide Research. 12 (1): 67–73. doi:10.1080/13811110701800962. PMID 18240036. S2CID 205804766.
- Zhang, Jie; Wieczorek, William F.; Conwell, Yeates; Ming Tu, Xin (2011). "Psychological strains and youth suicide in rural China". Social Science & Medicine. 72 (12): 2003–2010. doi:10.1016/j.socscimed.2011.03.048. PMC 3117917. PMID 21640457.
- Zhang, Jie. 2000. "Gender differences in athletic performance and their implications in gender ratios of suicide: A comparison between the USA and China." Omega: Journal of Death and Dying 41:117–123.
