= Illegitimate opportunity =

Illegitimate opportunity theory holds that individuals commit crimes not when the chances of being caught are low but from readily available illegitimate opportunities. The theory was first formalized by Richard Cloward and Lloyd Ohlin in 1960. It is closely related to strain theory (developed by Merton, an influential figure in functionalism and the subcultural theories surrounding it).
