= National Union of the Homeless =

The National Union of the Homeless (NUH) is a national union of local activist organizations that fight for housing rights and economic justice in the United States. The organization was active between 1985 and 1993 and was reestablished in 2020. At its height the National Union of the Homeless had over 20 local unions and 15,000 members.

== Background ==
The 1980s saw large increase in homeless throughout the United States. While the economy was ailing, the 1980s saw dramatic cuts in Federal spending on housing by the Reagan Administration. In the eight years of the Regan Administration federal housing spending dropped from $28.7 billion to $9.5 billion. This is exactly the period where the United States is saw its most active and largest organizing of homeless people around homeless issues.

In 1983 Chris Sprowal, Tex Howard, and Franklyn Smith founded Committee for Dignity and Fairness for the Homeless in Philadelphia. In 1984, the Committee founded the Dignity Shelter in Philadelphia, the first ever homeless shelter founded and run by homeless people. The Committee also help found the Philadelphia/Delaware Valley Union for the Homeless which began to organize around homeless issues. They got homeless people 24-hour intake in city shelters, the right to vote, and (by staging bath-ins at public fountains) public showers. The union went national, spreading to 13 cities by 1986. The National Union of the Homeless was officially founded in 1985 in Philadelphia. In November 1986 the Tompkins Square Union of the Homeless, the New York City local, was formed.

== Campaigns ==
In 1986 NUH launched what was called a "Winter Offensive" under the slogan of “Homes and Jobs: Not Death in the Streets." The offensive included organizing drives of the locals across the country, civil disobedience actions, and tribunals for community leaders about the vicious cycle for people living on the streets. In 1988 NUH launched the "Take Off the Boards" Campaign where the group began to organize housing takeovers across the country. In 1988 NUH took over 11 VA owned houses in Philadelphia as part of the national campaign.

=== Housing Now! March and HUD Demonstration ===
In October 1989 NUH help organize a Housing Now! march on Washington, D.C., in 1989. The event would be co-organized by the National Coalition for the Homeless, National Low-Income Housing Coalition, and Voices for Creative Non-violence NUH wanted militant nonviolent disobedience to push issues of the homeless to forefront. However, one of the funders of the march, the AFL-CIO, wanted a peaceful and legal event so other three organizations pushed against civil disobedience. In the end, NUH agreed to the legal march and would mobilize the homeless, however, they would end up planning a separate more confrontational protest the day before the Housing Now! Rally.

On October 6, 1989 about 600 people from 23 cities descended on the HUD headquarters in Washington, D.C. NUH demanded to meet with the Secretary of HUD or barricade the building. National Union of the Homeless met with the Secretary of HUD, Jack Kemp, to talk about the severe problem of homelessness and what HUD was going to do to help solve it. Kemp made significant concessions by promising that 10% of HUD's vacant housing stock would be turned over to homeless people in the coming year. Larger amounts of vacant housing would be turned over to the homeless in following years. Kemp ultimately broke his promise, and in response, poor and homeless cities began breaking in and taking over these HUD homes.

=== NUH's HUD-Targeted Takeover Campaign ===
In May 1990 NUH coordinated takeovers of empty, federally owned houses in New York, Minneapolis, Detroit, Los Angeles, Tucson, Oakland, Chicago and Philadelphia. The Philadelphia/Delaware Valley Union of the Homeless, a NUH local took over 10 HUD homes in the Spring in order get HUD to turn over the Section 8 vouchers to Dignity Housing, who places homeless people in permanent housing. In December, HUD relented agreeing to release 123 vouchers in return for the squatters leaving the HUD-owned homes. The Oakland Union of the Homeless, a NUH local, took over 3 houses in 1990 and successfully petitioned California for an allocation of $1 million to the building of Dignity Housing West, an Oakland low-income housing development. The 26-unit James Lee Court Apartments came from this demand, as did 46 other units in Oakland.

== Organizing model ==
The National Union of the Homeless used what was called a "Johnnie Tillmon model" of organizing, named for the woman who was the first chair of the National Welfare Rights Organization. The model was based two central principles: 1) Poverty victims must be at the forefront of the movement to end poverty and 2) You only get what you are organized to take. Stemming from principles NUH stressed five interdependent ingredients of organizing: 1) teams of organizers identifying and organizing around issues on which people are prepared to act; 2) bases operation often associated with survival; 3) mutual support networks with wide-ranging organizations of poor folks and allies; 4) internal and external lines of communication; 5) nationally connected and educated leaders trained in political and consciousness raising strategy able to unite diverse but related struggles.

== Related organizations ==
- National Welfare Rights Organization
- Empty the Shelters, Fill the Houses
- Food Not Bombs

== Further information ==
- Baptist, Willie; Jan Rehman (2011). Pedagogy of the Poor. New York: Teachers College Press.
- Casanova, F. Each One Teach One. Willimantic, CT: Curbstone Press, 1996.

=== Films ===
- Homeless, Not Helpless. New York, 1987.
- Takeover. Skylight Pictures. 1990

https://nationalunionofthehomeless.org/National Union of the Homeless
