= Johnnie Tillmon =

American welfare rights activist

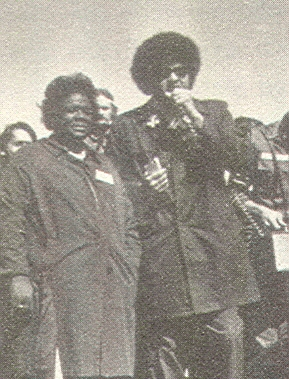
- NWRO Directors Johnnie Tillmon (left) and George Wiley (right)
- Born: Johnnie Lee Percy; April 10, 1926; Scott, Arkansas
- Died: November 22, 1995 (aged 69); Los Angeles, California
- Other names: Johnnie Tillmon
- Organization(s): Aid to Needy Children Mothers Anonymous; National Welfare Rights Organization
- Known for: Welfare rights activist
- Movement: Civil rights movement Welfare rights Women's rights
- Children: 6

Johnnie Tillmon Blackston (born Johnnie Lee Percy; April 10, 1926 – November 22, 1995) was an American welfare rights activist. She is regarded as one of the most influential welfare rights activists in the country, whose work with the National Welfare Rights Organization influenced the Civil Rights Movement and Dr. Martin Luther King Jr. in particular.

== Early life ==
Tillmon was born into a family of sharecroppers on April 10, 1926. When she was five years old, her mother died during childbirth and in 1944, she went to live with her aunt. Tillmon never finished high school.

She left to marry James Tillmon in 1948, but they divorced in 1952. In 1959 she moved to California to join her brothers. By that time she was a single mother to six children.

== Civil rights activism ==
=== The National Welfare Rights Organization and welfare rights ===
In California she found work as a union shop steward in a Compton laundry. In 1963, she became ill, causing her to miss work. She then began to worry about her children growing up without proper supervision as a result of her job.

After seeking public assistance, Tillmon became subject to harassment by welfare officials, including invasive "midnight raids," wherein officials would inspect residences looking for evidence of a hidden windfall, proof of a man in residence, or evidence of secret profits. Seeing how people on welfare were treated, she organized mothers and welfare recipients in the Nickerson Garden housing project where she lived through the Nickerson Gardens Planning Organization.

Within months, she and her friends had founded Aid to Needy Children-Mothers Anonymous, one of the first grassroots welfare mothers' organizations. ANC Mothers Anonymous later became part of the National Welfare Rights Organization. George Wiley, a chemist and civil rights activist, became the latter's first executive director while Tillmon served as its first chairman. At its peak in the late 1960s, the organization had nearly 25,000 dues-paying members.

In 1972, Wiley resigned and Tillmon moved to Washington to become the organization's executive director. Though the organization was financially strained at that point, the role was a paying position which allowed her to go off welfare. She served in this role until 1974, when the organization shut down due to lack of funds. She then returned to California where she worked as a legislative aid and served on welfare committees at both the state and local levels.

=== Women's rights ===
While Wiley and his advisers tried to mobilize the working poor, especially white blue-collar workers, into the welfare rights movement, welfare mothers, led by Tillmon, sought to align with a women's movement and gain support from feminist organizations such as the National Organization for Women (NOW). Tillmon herself attempted to broaden the horizons of the feminist movement by redefining poverty as a "women's issue," delivering speeches to mostly-female audiences in which she frequently compared the bureaucracy of welfare to a sexist marriage.

Whereas the mainstream women's liberation movement was made up of younger, middle-class white women organizing around their right to join the workforce, the women of the welfare rights movement—consisting mostly of black women with organizers in Puerto Rican neighborhoods and on Native American reservations—prioritized motherhood and making welfare a guaranteed right. At the time welfare programs could cancel or alter benefits if the recipients had more children or if a male partner moved in, and some welfare mothers were forcibly sterilized to prevent them from having more children.

In her landmark 1972 essay, "Welfare Is a Woman's Issue," which was published in Ms., she emphasized women's right to adequate income, regardless of whether they worked in a factory or at home raising children.

== Later life, death and legacy ==
Tillmon married her second husband, Harvey Blackston, a blues harmonica player known as Harmonica Fats, in 1979. They lived together in Watts, in a house only a few blocks from Nickerson Gardens.

Tillmon died at Huntington Memorial Hospital in Los Angeles on November 22, 1995, at the age of 69. Her cause of death was diabetes. Tillmon had used a wheelchair after the amputation of her left foot and was on dialysis for four years prior to her death.

In 1996, Harmonica Fats released the album Blow, Fat Daddy, Blow! as a collaboration with Bernie Pearl. The album was dedicated to the memory of Tillmon.

The National Union of the Homeless used what was called a "Johnnie Tillmon model" of organizing, named after her.
