= Talk Radio and the American Dream =

Book by Murray Levin

- Author: Murray Levin
- Publication date: 1987

Talk Radio and the American Dream is a 1987 book by Boston University political science professor Murray Levin. Levin was one of the first political scientists to notice the significant role that talk radio shows were playing in American politics. Rather than being a homeostatic device, talk radio shows were actually articulating the rage of the working class that, through the 1972 Presidential election made up the New Deal coalition originally created by President Franklin D. Roosevelt. By the late 1970s and early 1980s, this once-reliable base of support for the Democratic Party had skewed towards the right and represented a shift in political power that gave rise to Reaganism.
