= Claimants union =

Type of United Kingdom organisation

A claimants union is a grassroots organisation based on self-help and mutual support to enable those entitled to welfare benefits to make successful claims for that benefit. They were particularly prevalent in the United Kingdom following the establishment of the British welfare state. A claimant, in the context of insurance, is a policyholder who files a claim or formal request for payment from their insurer to cover a specific loss.

== Claimants unions by jurisdiction ==
=== United Kingdom ===
==== Origins ====
Cross party support led to the introduction of a welfare state in the UK by the late 1940s. Whilst this led to a somewhat self-congratulatory viewpoint that poverty had been largely eliminated, this perspective was increasingly being criticised by the 1950s. The research of Brian Abel-Smith and Peter Townsend, The Poor and the Poorest, published in 1965, argued that poverty had increased from 1953 to 1960 and that a significant factor in this was a gap between formal entitlement to benefits and the amount people actually claimed. Abel-Smith and Townsend founded the Child Poverty Action Group (CPAG). However Abel-Smith was to work closely with the Wilson administration, while Townsend was to play a critical and oppositional role with the second director of the CPAG, Frank Field, particularly in the run up to the 1966 general election. This perspective particularly affected the growing radical students movement, who were to provide an important impetus to the emergence of the claimants unions. Hilary Rose argues that in these circumstances, students who wished to engage with working class activism looked for new emergent forms rather than linking with the Labour Party whose credentials as being a voice for the working class were being increasingly questioned. While this often meant they were drawn to community politics, the perceived failings of the welfare state encouraged such students to get involved with claimants unions. Thus it was five working-class students in Birmingham who founded the first claimants union in Sparkhill in January 1969.

==== Birmingham Claimants Union ====
Starting from Sparkhill, the Birmingham Claimants Union (BCU) started to develop their own approach to organising around welfare rights: they were more an organisation of the poor rather than an organisation for the poor like CPAG. Likewise an individual advisor-client relationship was rejected in favour of discussing each case in the whole meeting, which provided an important organisational lesson: by working together people could do things for themselves. This approach was also reflected in the article "Democracy for the Poorest", written for the Institute for Workers' Control in 1969. Despite starting from an original format based on generic trade union structures, the BCU soon developed an approach much more based on participatory democracy. They challenged the way the Supplementary benefit appeal tribunals were run, arguing that with staff appointed from within the Department of Health and Social Security, the very organisation which implemented Supplementary Benefit, the tribunals were hardly independent.

== Participatory democracy ==
The intent of this article is to reflect on the notion of empowered participatory governance in order to gain a better understanding of the institutional contexts and parameters that encourage a more participative democracy, and thereby bring to light the political mechanisms that contribute to broadening the decision-making process. The example we consider is the Montreal Participative Budget ( PB). We focus on the impact of decentralization, more specifically on the form this took as the Montreal PB was being elaborated. We examine how much decentralization circumscribes the PB process. The Montreal Participative Budget provides an illustration of the emergence of a participative level in a political context that is, on the whole, hostile to participatory decision making. We suggest that the PB in this context benefits from a new window of opportunity. The chosen example has a dual significance: it underlines the role of temporal contingencies and scales of the process of decentralization in the participative structures at the local level, and it enables us to gain a better grasp of the problem of institutional architectures in implementing participatory democracy by emphasizing the political and social realities underlying new loci for decision making.
