= National Association of Welfare Rights Advisers =

The National Association of Welfare Rights Advisers (NAWRA) is a professional membership organisation for Welfare Rights advice providers across the UK. Membership of NAWRA is available to groups or individuals working in the welfare rights field and/or who support the organisations aims and objectives.

It has twin aims:

- To challenge, influence and improve welfare rights policy and legislation;
- To promote NAWRA as the national voice of welfare rights advisers.

Alan Markey, of Coventry Independent Advice Service, is chair of the Association. NAWRA celebrated its 50th anniversary in 2025, holding an advice summit to mark the event.

It holds four conferences each year that are free for members to attend. Conferences are usually held across England, Wales and Scotland. Conferences were held online during the COVID-19 pandemic and now alternate between in-person and online events.

NAWRA maintains a public website and makes recommendations to policy makers. NAWRA has been vocal about problems encountered in the introduction of Universal Credit and submitted evidence to the Work and Pensions Committee on Universal Credit in March 2017. Shirley-Anne Somerville addressed the association's conference in Glasgow in 2018 and called on the UK Government to halt the Universal Credit roll out. It is particularly opposed to the sanctions regime, which they say disproportionally affect vulnerable groups.

It lobbies the Department for Work and Pensions and politicians about problems with the benefit system. In 2014 it identified systematic errors in moving claimants from Incapacity Benefit on to Employment and Support Allowance. This error was condemned by the Public Accounts Committee in 2018 who said it stemmed from a string of avoidable management failures. The Association told the committee that the department could be “unconstructive” when confronted with legitimate concerns by outside organisations.

On 13 January 2026, NAWRA held an event at the House of Commons (hosted by Marsha de Cordova MP) calling for the provision of social welfare advice to become a statutory duty.
