= Welfare rights =

Right to correct state welfare benefits

Welfare rights means the rights of people to be aware of and receive their maximum entitlement to state welfare benefits, and to be treated reasonably well by the welfare system. It has been established in the United Kingdom since 1969 and has also been developed in other countries including Ireland, Australia and the United States. It became necessary because of the complexity of the UK social security system and had links at the time with a growing Claimants Union movement. As local authorities realized the advantages of having well-informed front-line staff such as housing officers and social workers, who often have to deal with benefit queries as part of their wider tasks, they turned to welfare rights staff to provide that expertise for both training and handling complex cases. In the 1980s, as local authorities took on the wider 'equalities' agenda, anti-poverty work was seen as a valid local activity in itself. Increasing benefit income helps individuals but also boosts the local economy.

== Welfare rights in the United Kingdom ==
Some local authorities and voluntary sector organisations, such as the Citizens Advice Bureau, employ paid or volunteer welfare rights advisers. These advisers usually offer free, impartial and independent advice, information and support on all aspects of social security benefits and tax credits, including free representation at a First-tier Tribunal and Upper Tribunal, which are administered by the UK Ministry of Justice.

Welfare rights advice and representation is also provided by some solicitors, barristers and independent advisers or companies. These advisers may charge a fee or they might provide limited pro-bono (free) advice and assistance.

Welfare rights advisers generally offer expert lay legal advice in dealings with public departments, such as local authority Housing Benefit and Council Tax Benefit services, Her Majesty's Revenue and Customs (HMRC) and the Department for Work and Pensions (DWP).

Welfare rights advisers will generally:

- Check what benefits or tax credits people may be entitled to
- Assist with complex benefit application forms
- Advise and represent on all aspects of social security law, including entitlement to benefits, backdating, suspensions and overpayments
- Provide advocacy and representation before social security appeal Tribunals

Welfare rights advisers often use a case management system to help them manage their work. These can be paper based, computer based or online.

Welfare rights officers are often closely allied with campaigning groups and charities such as the Child Poverty Action Group (CPAG), Citizens Advice Bureau and London Advice Service Alliance (LASA), for example. These organizations are respected for their training and publications, which are used extensively by advisers throughout the UK, as well as their campaigning activities.

Welfare rights advisers' professional organization is the National Association of Welfare Rights Advisers (NAWRA) at a UK level; Scotland has its own professional association, Rights Advice Scotland (RAS).

== Welfare rights in the United States ==
The Flemming Rule of 1960, named after Arthur Flemming, was an administrative ruling which decreed that states could not deny income assistance eligibility through the Aid to Families with Dependent Children program on the basis of a home being considered unsuitable per the woman's children being termed as illegitimate.

In 1963 Johnnie Tillmon founded ANC (Aid to Needy Children) Mothers Anonymous, which was one of the first grassroots welfare mothers’ organizations, and which eventually became part of the National Welfare Rights Organization.

The National Welfare Rights Organization, active from 1966 to 1975, was an activist organization that fought for the welfare rights of people, especially women and children. The organization had four goals: adequate income, dignity, justice, and democratic participation. Johnnie Tillmon was the first chair of the organization.

King v. Smith, 392 U.S. 309 (1968), was a decision in which the Supreme Court held that Aid to Families with Dependent Children could not be withheld because of the presence of a "substitute father" who visited a family on weekends.

In April 1991 Cheri Honkala founded the Kensington Welfare Rights Union, a progressive social justice, political action, and advocacy group of, by, and for the poor and homeless which is operating out of Philadelphia, Pennsylvania and led by Galen Tyler.

== Bibliography ==
- Welfare Benefits and Tax Credits Handbook (annual publication) Child Poverty Action Group. London.
- Disability Rights Handbook (annual publication). Disability Alliance. London.
- Bateman, N. (2006) Practising Welfare Rights Routledge. Oxford.
