= Frances Fox Piven =

American sociologist (born 1932)

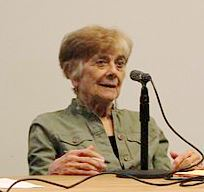
- Piven in 2012
- Born: Frances Fox; October 10, 1932 (age 94); Calgary, Alberta, Canada
- Citizenship: United States
- Education: University of Chicago (B.A., M.A., Ph.D.)
- Spouses: Herman Piven (divorced); Richard Cloward (until his death, 2001)
- Scientific career
- Fields: Political science, sociology
- Workplaces: Boston University, City University of New York
- Thesis: The Function of Research in the Formation of City Planning Policy (1962)
- Doctoral advisor: Edward C. Banfield
- Doctoral students: Jane McAlevey, Immanuel Ness

Frances Fox Piven (born October 10, 1932) is an American professor of political science and sociology at the Graduate Center of the City University of New York, where she has taught since 1982.

Piven is known for her contributions to social theory and for her activism. An advocate of the War on Poverty and subsequent welfare-rights protests, both in New York City and on the national stage, she was instrumental in formulating the theoretical underpinnings of the welfare rights movement.

Over the course of her career, she has served on the boards of the ACLU and the Democratic Socialists of America, and has also held offices in several professional associations, including the American Political Science Association and the Society for the Study of Social Problems. Previously, Piven was a member of the political science faculty at Boston University.

According to the American Political Science Association, Piven is among the top 100 most cited political scientists in the discipline of political science.

== Early life and education ==
Piven was born in Calgary, Alberta, Canada, of Russian-Jewish parents, Rachel (née Paperny) and Albert Fox, a storekeeper. Both had emigrated from Uzlyany, a shtetl near Minsk. Piven's family moved to the United States when she was one. She would later become a naturalized U.S. citizen in 1953.

Piven's childhood was spent in Jackson Heights, Queens, New York. She went to P.S. 148 and she exhibited rebelliousness at an early age:

In elementary school, she refused to say the Pledge of Allegiance, even after being forced to stand in a corner with her face to the wall. "I said I could only pledge allegiance to the Maple Leaf," Ms. Piven recalled. "I was a Canadian."

Next, she attended Newtown High School and then went away to college in Chicago. She received a B.A. in City Planning in 1953, an M.A. in 1956, and a Ph.D. in 1962, all from the University of Chicago. She attended on a scholarship and waitressed for living expenses. Her dissertation was directed by Edward C. Banfield.

== Career ==
Piven was married to her long-time collaborator Richard Cloward until his death in 2001. Together they wrote an article in the May 1966 issue of The Nation titled "The Weight of the Poor: A Strategy to End Poverty". The article advocated increased enrollment in social welfare programs in order to collapse the system and force reforms, leading to a guaranteed annual income. This political strategy has been referred to as the "Cloward–Piven strategy".

From 1999 to 2000, Piven served as the first female Wayne Morse Chair of Law and Politics, established in honor of the late former Senator, at the University of Oregon. From 2006 to 2007, she was President of the American Sociological Association.

While teaching at Boston University, she and four of her political science department colleagues, including Murray Levin and Howard Zinn, refused to return to the workplace after the settlement of the 1979 Boston University strike by the AAUP. The university's clerical and support staff had struck at the same time, but their strike was not resolved. Piven, Levin, and Zinn refused to cross their picket line, instead holding classes elsewhere in solidarity with the unresolved strike. The "B.U. Five" were threatened with dismissal by Boston University President John Silber. Silber backed down, and Piven and the others returned to the classroom. Piven eventually left Boston University for the City University of New York at the Graduate Center.

=== Activism and legislation ===
Throughout her career, Piven has combined academic work with political action. In 1968, she signed the "Writers and Editors War Tax Protest" pledge, vowing to refuse tax payments in protest against the Vietnam War. In 1983 she co-founded Human SERVE (Service Employees Registration and Voter Education), an organization with the goal of increasing voter registration by linking voter registration offerings with the use of social services or state Departments of Motor Vehicles. Human SERVE's initiative was incorporated by the National Voter Registration Act of 1993, colloquially known as the "Motor Voter Bill".

She is a member of the Democratic Socialists of America, and was one of its Honorary Chairs.

In 1980, Piven tangled with Milton Friedman and Thomas Sowell in a debate televised on PBS as part of its series, Free to Choose.

=== Writings ===
Among Piven's major works are: Regulating the Poor written with Richard Cloward, first published in 1972 and updated in 1993, it analyzes government welfare policy and how it has been used to exert power over the lower classes; Poor People's Movements, published in 1977, a chronicle of rebellious social movements in the U.S. and how some were able to induce important reforms; Why Americans Don't Vote, published in 1988 and a follow-up book Why Americans Still Don't Vote published in 2000, each of which look at U.S. electoral practices that tend to discourage poor and working-class Americans from exercising their right to vote; The War at Home (2004), a critical examination of the domestic results of the wars initiated by the Bush administration; and Challenging Authority: How Ordinary People Change America (2006), a look at the interaction of disruptive social movements and electoral politics in generating the necessary political momentum for democratic reform in American history.

== Honors and awards ==
- Bronislaw Malinowski Award (2015)
- American Sociological Association Career Award for the Practice of Sociology (2000)
- Charles McCoy Career Achievement Award of the Caucus for a New Political Science of the American Political Science Association (2004)
- Mary Lepper Award of the Women's Caucus of the American Political Science Association (1998)
- American Sociology Association Lifetime Achievement Award for Political Sociology
- Tides Foundation Award for Excellence in Public Advocacy (1995)
- Annual Award of the National Association of Secretaries of State (1994)
- President's Award of the American Public Health Association (1993)
- Lee/Founders Award of the Society for the Study of Social Problems
- Eugene V. Debs Foundation Prize
- C. Wright Mills Award

== Works ==
- Labor Parties in Postindustrial Societies (Oxford University Press, 1992, ISBN 978-0-19-520927-3)
- The War at Home: The Domestic Costs of Bush's Militarism (New Press, 2004, ISBN 978-1-59558-092-4)
- Challenging Authority: How Ordinary People Change America (Rowman and Littlefield, 2006, ISBN 978-0-7425-6316-2)
- Lessons for Our Struggle (Haymarket Books, 2011)

with Richard Cloward:

- Regulating the Poor: The Functions of Public Welfare (Pantheon, 1971, 2nd ed: Vintage, 1993, ISBN 978-0-679-74516-7)
- Poor People's Movements: Why They Succeed, How They Fail (Pantheon, 1977, ISBN 978-0-394-72697-7)
- New Class War: Reagan's Attack on the Welfare State and Its Consequences (Pantheon, 1982, ISBN 978-0-394-70647-4)
- Why Americans Don't Vote (Pantheon, 1988, ISBN 978-0-394-55396-2)
- The Breaking of the American Social Compact (New Press, 1997, ISBN 978-1-56584-476-6)
- Why Americans Still Don't Vote: And Why Politicians Want it That Way (Beacon, 2000, ISBN 978-0-8070-0449-4)
- Who's Afraid of Frances Fox Piven? The Essential Writings of the Professor Glenn Beck Loves to Hate (New Press, 2011, ISBN 978-1-59558-719-0)

with Lee Staples and Richard Cloward:

- Roots to Power: A Manual for Grassroots Organizing (Praeger, 1984, ISBN 978-0-275-91800-2)

with Lorraine Minnite and Margaret Groarke:

- Keeping Down the Black Vote: Race and the Demobilization of American Voters (New Press, 2009, ISBN 978-1-59558-354-3)

The Frances Fox Piven Papers are held by Smith College.
