= Murray Levin =

American political science professor

Murray Burton Levin (1927–1999) was a political science professor at Boston University from 1955 through his retirement in 1989. A progressive who once had been a member of the Communist Party USA, Levin was an unreconstructed radical throughout his academic career. In addition to teaching a popular core course on political science, Levin specialized in teaching Marxist political theory to both undergraduate and graduate students. Long before the collapse of the Soviet Union, Levin eventually came to the conclusion that Marxist theory was not a science, let alone a viable system of economics, but was a powerful propaganda tool to mobilize the masses against capital. Class consciousness would be obtained ultimately when the masses finally revolted against the oligarchy.

== Early influences ==
The progeny of a wealthy business family, Murray Levin took his bachelor's degree at Harvard College, the family's undergraduate alma mater, after completing his military service with the United States Navy, serving as a military attaché' to a vice admiral during World War II. (Levin remained an excellent tennis player until late in life, and his primary duty was playing tennis with the admiral.)

At Harvard, he was vastly influenced by the ideas of professor Louis Hartz. Hartz believed that the lack of feudalism in America had created a situation in which only one creed, liberalism (in the classic sense), could be tolerated. Since there was no tolerance for collectivist-oriented systems like socialism, if the U.S. economic system were ever again to suffer a catastrophic failure such as that of the Great Depression, the U.S. might be imperiled by the lack of a viable, legitimate alternative such as socialism. Hartz's theories, as articulated in his 1955 book The Liberal Tradition in America, served the basis for Levin's own ideas. Levin took his master's and Ph.D. degrees at Columbia University.

== The "B.U. Five" ==
At Boston University, Levin was a close associate of Howard Zinn, whose office was located next to his in the political science department building. Both Levin, Zinn and fellow poli-sci faculty member Frances Fox Piven became part of the "B.U. Five" when they refused to cross union picket lines during a 1979 strike by clerical and custodial workers at the university and were targeted for retaliation by B.U. President John Silber. Silber had earlier rejected a labor contract already negotiated by the American Association of University Professors and the university, which resulted in the professors out on strike in the fall semester of 1979. The clerks and custodians soon followed. When the university settled with the AAUP, the vast majority of professors went back to work teaching, but Levin, Zinn, Piven and two others refused to cross the other unions' picket lines.

Levin and Zinn were two of the harshest critics of Silber's top-down "industrial" paradigm of university administration, in which Silber equated an institution of higher learning to a car factory. For their opposition, Silber had "merit" pay increases continually denied them. (Piven eventually left B.U. for a position at City University of New York.)

== Talk radio and the American Dream ==
With a keen eye for the alienated voter, Levin was one of the first political scientists to notice the role talk radio was playing in American politics. Talk radio shows were articulating the rage of what President Richard M. Nixon called "The Silent Majority" and others eventually described as "Joe Six-Pack" and "Reagan Democrats": the alienated working class that once made up the New Deal-Fair Deal-New Frontier-Great Society coalition. Levin realized that by the late 1970s and early 1980s, this once reliable base of support for the Democratic Party were ripe pickings for reactionaries who could articulate their rage.

== Edward M. Kennedy ==
Levin said that Edward Kennedy became a United States senator at the age of 30 "with one year of frantic campaigning and 30 years of experience as a Kennedy". He was a topic of several of Levin's books. As a progressive, Levin could be scathing about Kennedy, but he did concede in 1980 that he was the most effective person in the pre-1980 Presidential election Senate. (In that year the Democrats lost their majority in the United States Senate for the first time since the 1950s.) However, he felt that this situation was an indictment of American democracy rather than an endorsement of Kennedy.

== Murray B. Levin Legacy Fund ==
In the Spring of 2006, Boston University announced the formation of the Murray B. Levin Legacy Fund to honor the late professor. Most of the fund, a $250,000 endowment, came from the Lawrence and Lillian Solomon Fund, Inc. Lawrence Solomon, a real estate attorney, was very much influenced by Levin while a B.U. undergrad. B.U. Board of Trustees Chairman Alan Leventhal is matching 50% of the endowment with a grant, and other B.U. professors and alumni are making financial contributions to the fund, which will provide scholarships to students majoring in political science or related disciplines. This is a development welcomed by many alumni of B.U., which has the lowest alumni giving rate of any major American university, and was only possible with the waning of John Silber's power at B.U.

== See also ==
- American Association of University Professors
- Boston University
- Frances Fox Piven
- John Silber
- Howard Zinn

== Books ==
- The Compleat Politician (with George Blackwood) (1962)
- The Alienated Voter: Politics in Boston (1965)
- Kennedy Campaigning: the System and the Style as Practiced By Senator Edward Kennedy (1966)
- Political Hysteria in America: the Democratic Capacity for Repression (1971)
- Edward Kennedy: The Myth of Leadership (1980)
- Talk Radio and the American Dream (1986)
- Teach Me!: Kids Will Learn When Oppression Is the Lesson (1998)
