= Steven Messner =

American sociologist (born 1951)

Steven F. Messner
- Born: February 27, 1951 (age 75)
- Education: Columbia University (B.A., 1983); Princeton University (Ph.D., 1978)
- Awards: Fellow of the American Society of Criminology
- Scientific career
- Fields: Sociology, criminology
- Workplaces: University at Albany, SUNY
- Thesis: Income inequality and murder rates: a cross-national analysis (1978)

Steven Fredrick Messner (born February 27, 1951) is an American sociologist and Distinguished Teaching Professor in the sociology department at University at Albany, SUNY.

== Education ==
Messner received his undergraduate degree from Columbia University and his master's and doctoral degrees from Princeton University.

== Career ==
Prior to joining the faculty of the University at Albany, Messner taught at Columbia University and Nankai University.

== Research ==
Messner is known for researching violent crime, especially homicide. Specific topics he has studied include social disorganization theory and spatial patterns of crime, homicides in New York City, and monthly variations in homicide rates.

== Honors, awards and positions ==
Messner was elected a fellow of the American Society of Criminology in 2002, and served as its president from 2010 to 2011. He has served as the chair of the Crime, Law, and Deviance Section of the American Sociological Association and on the executive committee for the Eastern Sociological Society. He received a Collins Fellowship from the University at Albany in 2007, and an award for Excellence in Scholarship and Creative Activities from the University chancellor in 2011.

Professional and academic associations
Preceded by Richard Rosenfeld	President of the American Society of Criminology; 2011	Succeeded by Robert J. Sampson
