= Richard Rosenfeld =

American criminologist (1948–2024)

Richard Bruce Rosenfeld
- Born: December 20, 1948; St. Louis, Missouri, U.S.
- Died: January 8, 2024 (aged 75); St. Louis, Missouri, U.S.
- Education: University of Oregon
- Awards: Fellow in the American Society of Criminology in 2005, President of the American Society of Criminology in 2010, Edwin H. Sutherland Award from the American Society of Criminology in 2017, and Fulbright Scholar from 2016-2021
- Scientific career
- Fields: Criminology
- Workplaces: University of Missouri–St. Louis
- Thesis: Inequality and crime (1984)

Richard Rosenfeld (December 20, 1948 – January 8, 2024) was an American criminologist and Curators’ Distinguished Professor Emeritus at the University of Missouri–St. Louis.

== Early life and education ==
Richard Rosenfeld was born in St. Louis, Missouri, on December 20, 1948. He received his B.A. in 1972 and his Ph.D. in sociology in 1984, both from the University of Oregon.

== Career ==
After serving as a postdoctoral research fellow in criminology at the Carnegie Mellon University School of Urban and Public Affairs (1984-1985), he worked as an assistant professor of sociology at Skidmore College (1985-1989). In 1989, he joined the Department of Criminology & Criminal Justice at the UMSL as an assistant professor and research fellow in the Center for Metropolitan Studies (1989-1997). He was promoted to associate professor with tenure in 1992 as well as to full professor in 1997. He served as department chair from 2001-2004, as a visiting professor in the CUNY Graduate Center of John Jay College of Criminal Justice in the fall of 2008, the criminologist in residence for the City of St. Louis Public Safety Department and Metropolitan Police Department, as well as a Fulbright Visiting Professor in the Institute of Criminology at Hewbrew University in 2016. In 2007, he was appointed Curators' Professor of Criminology and Criminal Justice at the UMSL. He was also recognized as a Founders Professor (2014-2019) and Thomas Jefferson Professor (2016-2017) (State of Missouri, University of Missouri System). During his retirement (2019-2024), he was a Curators' Distinguished Professor Emeritus of Criminology and Criminal Justice at the UMSL.

Rosenfeld served as executive counselor of the American Society of Criminology from 2001 to 2003 and president from 2009 to 2010. He served as associate editor of the journal Criminology (1997-2001) and on the Editorial Board of several major journals (i.e., American Sociological Review [2012-2014]; Criminology [2012-2015]; Homicide Studies [2001-2023]; Crime, Law, and Social Change [2011-2019]; Criminology & Public Policy [2021-2023]).

== Research ==
Rosenfeld's research focused on crime statistics and policies aimed at reducing crime, also known as crime control. In a 2014 study, Rosenfeld and Williams, found that most defendants in gun crime cases in St. Louis were young males with prior felony arrests, and that about 40 percent of people arrested for such crimes were never charged. His research has also found that half of all violent crime in St. Louis occurs in only 5 percent of the city's street blocks, most of which were in disadvantaged neighborhoods on the city's north side. A 2015 report authored by Rosenfeld and released by the Sentencing Project that found that there was no convincing evidence of the alleged Ferguson effect in St. Louis. In 2016, he changed his mind stating that, "The only explanation that gets the timing right is a version of the Ferguson effect."

== Honors and awards ==
Over his professional tenure, Dr. Rosenfeld received many prestigious awards and fellowships. He was recognized with all three of UMSL's Chancellor's Awards, earning the Chancellor’s Award for Excellence in Teaching (2014), Research (2006), as well as Service (2013). Within the American Society of Criminology, he was recognized as a Fellow (2005), with the Edwin H. Sutherland Award (2017), and served as President in 2010. He was selected as a National Associate of the National Research Council (NRC) (National Academy of Sciences) in 2011. He was also a [Fulbright Program|Fulbright Scholar] (2016-2021) and a Fulbright Visiting Professor in Hewbrew University's Institute of Criminology in 2016.

== Death ==
Rosenfield died in St. Louis on January 8, 2024, at the age of 75.

Professional and academic associations
Preceded by Todd Clear	President of the American Society of Criminology; 2010	Succeeded by Steven Messner
