= Richard Cloward =

American sociologist and activist (1926–2001)

- Born: December 25, 1926; Rochester, New York, US
- Died: August 20, 2001 (aged 74); New York City, US
- Occupation: Sociologist
- Known for: Cloward-Piven strategy
- Spouse: Frances Fox Piven

Academic background
- Education: Columbia University, University of Rochester
- Alma mater: Columbia University
- Thesis: Social Control and Anomie: A Study of a Prison Community (1959)
- Academic advisors: Robert K. Merton, Lloyd Ohlin

Academic work
- Institutions: Columbia University
- Main interests: Strain theory (sociology), Anomie
- Notable works: "The Weight of the Poor: A Strategy to End Poverty"
- Notable ideas: Cloward-Piven strategy

Richard Andrew Cloward (December 25, 1926 – August 20, 2001) was an American sociologist and activist. He influenced the Strain theory of criminal behavior and the concept of anomie, and was a primary motivator for the passage of the National Voter Registration Act of 1993, commonly known as the "Motor Voter Act". He taught at Columbia University for 47 years.

== Early life ==
Cloward was born in Rochester, New York, the son of Esther Marie (Fleming), an artist and women's rights activist, and Donald Cloward, a radical Baptist minister. Cloward served as an ensign in the United States Navy from 1944 to 1946. He received a bachelor's degree from the University of Rochester in 1949, and then a master's degree from the Columbia University School of Social Work in 1950. He then served as a first lieutenant in the U.S. Army from 1951 to 1954, and later worked as a social worker in an army prison in New Cumberland, Pennsylvania. Cloward became an assistant professor at Columbia's School of Social Work in 1954, and had visiting posts at the Hebrew University, the University of Amsterdam, the University of California, Santa Barbara and Arizona State University. He received a doctorate in sociology from Columbia University in 1958.

Together with fellow sociologist Lloyd Ohlin, Cloward wrote Delinquency and Opportunity: A Theory of Delinquent Gangs, which rejected the prevailing premise that delinquency resulted from individual irresponsibility and argued it was caused by poverty and the lack of alternative opportunities caused by poverty, and that the conditions underlying delinquency could be resolved through social programs.

== Political activities ==
In 1966, Cloward co-founded the National Welfare Rights Organization, which advocated federalizing Aid to Families with Dependent Children by building local welfare rolls. In 1982, he and his wife Frances Fox Piven founded "Human SERVE" (Service Employees Registration and Voter Education), which established motor-voter programs in selected states as precedents for the Motor Voter Act enacted in 1993.

Also in 1966, he and Piven published a paper in the May issue of The Nation magazine — "The Weight of the Poor: A Strategy to End Poverty", which advocated wiping out poverty by launching "[w]idespread campaigns to register the eligible poor for welfare aid, and to help existing recipients obtain their full benefits, [to] produce bureaucratic disruption in welfare agencies and fiscal disruption in local and state governments", which they believed would lead to the implementation of a guaranteed minimum income. They advocated stressing the system to the point of failure in the belief it would be replaced with a better alternative. Based on the title of the paper and their repeated use in it of the word "strategy" to describe their proposal, the latter came to be known as the "Cloward-Piven Strategy".

As of 1993, he was a member of the Democratic Socialists of America.

== Bibliography ==
- Regulating the Poor: The Functions of Public Welfare (Pantheon, 1971)
- Poor People's Movements: Why They Succeed, How They Fail (Pantheon, 1977)
- Why Americans Don't Vote: And Why Politicians Want it That Way (Beacon, 1988)
- The Breaking of the American Social Compact (New Press, 1997)
