= National Welfare Rights Organization =

American activist organization

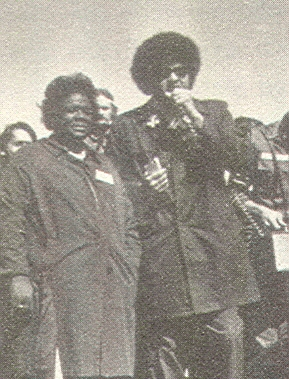
George Wiley (a founder and executive director of the National Welfare Rights Organization) is on the right, and the National Welfare Rights Organization's first chair and later executive director, Johnnie Tillmon, is on the left.

The National Welfare Rights Organization (NWRO) was an American activist organization that fought for the welfare rights of people, especially women and children. The organization had four goals: adequate income, dignity, justice, and democratic participation. The group was active from 1966 to 1975. At its peak in 1969, NWRO membership was estimated at 25,000 members (mostly African American women). Thousands more joined in NWRO protests.

== Roots ==
In 1963 Johnnie Tillmon founded ANC (Aid to Needy Children) Mothers Anonymous, which was one of the first grassroots welfare mothers’ organizations. This organization later became part of the National Welfare Rights Organization.

In early 1966, delegates from poor peoples’ organizations all over the country met in Syracuse, New York and Chicago, Illinois to discuss the need for unity among grassroots organizations for the poor in the United States. Around this same time, Richard Cloward and Frances Fox Piven, both of the Columbia University School of Social Work, were circulating a draft of an article called "The Weight of the Poor: A Strategy to End Poverty" that later appeared in The Nation. The article discussed the idea that the widespread distribution of information about welfare benefits eligibility could dramatically increase welfare rolls, thus creating a bureaucratic and fiscal crisis. In turn, this would lead to the replacement of public assistance programs that currently existed with a guaranteed annual income for all people. Cloward and Piven were more concerned with reaching community groups with this work than with academia, and the article helped to serve a link between the two.

=== George Wiley, CORE, PRAC, & the birth of a movement ===
In May 1966, George Wiley, a nationally recognized chemist, the second African American on the faculty of Syracuse University, and former associate director for the Congress of Racial Equality (CORE) and two of his associates from CORE set up the Poverty Rights Action Center (PRAC) in a two-story row house in Washington, D.C. The PRAC was intended to become a permanent headquarters for coordinating efforts of present poor people's organizations. The PRAC's first project was planning a series of demonstrations that were to be coordinated with a welfare recipients’ march from Cleveland to Columbus, Ohio that had already been planned. This march had been thought up by representatives of the United Farm Workers Organizing Committee led by César Chávez. The PRAC's efforts led to poverty rights demonstrations with thousands of participants in sixteen major cities on June 30, 1966, with extensive newspaper coverage in New York City, Washington, Chicago, Los Angeles, Baltimore, and Boston.

Although there was no formal tie between the participating groups, the NWRO refers to the June 30 demonstrations as "the birth of a movement." Broad coalitions of groups sponsored each city's activities, including, but not limited to, welfare recipient organizations. Over time, there was an increase in coordination and cooperation between these welfare recipient groups and thus a nationwide welfare recipients’ organization was needed.

=== National coordinating committee formed ===
In August 1966, the representatives of welfare recipient groups from 24 cities met in Chicago, voting to form the National Coordinating Committee of Welfare Rights Groups (NCC). The PRAC office was officially named the headquarters for a welfare rights movement at a December 1966 meeting of the NCC. PRAC was authorized by the NCC in February 1967 to come up with a membership card for all groups affiliated with the NCC. Uniform membership requirements and a common dues structure for its affiliates were adopted by the NCC in April 1967.

== Early stages ==
In August 1967, delegates from 67 local welfare rights organizations met in Washington, D.C., and adopted a constitution that was drafted by the PRAC staff and had been adopted by the NCC, thus forming the National Welfare Rights Organization (NWRO). Johnnie Tillmon became the first chair of the NWRO. The NCC made a place for itself within the NWRO as the main decision-making body in the national structure of the organization. However, despite a nationwide organization, local welfare rights groups still retained nearly complete autonomy for their local actions.

During the first few months of the new movement, the NWRO narrowed its focus from attempting to create a movement that would encompass all poor people to concentrating on those individuals who receive public assistance. Welfare recipients were easily organizable and they had the greatest measureable performance within the movement.

Also in the early stages of the movement, Wiley rejected Cloward and Piven's strategy of flooding welfare rolls with new welfare recipients and instead favored a strategy of organizing current welfare recipients into pressure groups. Critics of the Cloward-Piven strategy argued that it was easier to create a welfare crisis than to bring about its resolution. Activists, who were mainly welfare recipients themselves with little political power, would be left amidst this crisis with the ability to do nothing about it. This move was also easier organizationally for the movement because it was strategically more difficult to identify those who were eligible for welfare than those who already received it, it was also more difficult to motivate welfare-eligible individuals to act than those who already received it, and it was easier to organize current recipients of welfare by offering them benefits such as supplementary welfare payments.

== Activity ==
The NWRO's first major activity was lobbying against the work incentive provisions of the Social Security Amendments of 1967. The organization held demonstrations that included a sit-in at the United States Senate Committee on Finance hearing room. The activity brought the NWRO a lot of media attention but did not impact the shaping of legislation very heavily.

In 1968, just weeks before the assassination of Martin Luther King Jr., King acknowledged the NWRO, giving leaders of the movement and the issues at hand an important part in King's upcoming (without him) Poor People's Campaign. This nod from King later helped to promote the NWRO's first meeting between its leadership and the United States Secretary of Health, Education, and Welfare, held in the summer of 1968.

In December 1968, the organization was granted a large government contract to help monitor the Work Incentive Program. Funding from this and several other large grants from foundations helped to finance a major expansion of the NWRO staff, including the addition of field organizers.

The NWRO won much access to government officials during the first Nixon administration due to membership rolls growing larger and a bigger presence in the media. Leaders in the welfare rights movement were some of the first to be able to meet with Daniel P. Moynihan after he was appointed to the White House staff and leaders also started to meet regularly with Robert Finch, the Secretary of the Department of Health, Education and Welfare. During the drafting of the Family Assistance Plan, NWRO leaders were consulted by the Nixon administration and these leaders were also active in lobbying against the plan.

Despite demonstrations pointed toward the United States Congress and the Department of Health, Education and Welfare and traditional lobbying and negotiating efforts, welfare rights activities were not mainly centered at the national level. The movement has relied much more on simultaneous demonstrations based on common ideas and themes from local affiliates across the United States. NWRO publications, such as its newspaper The Welfare Fighter, document accounts of the accomplishments and activities that local affiliates participated in. Local groups fueled much of the activity, such as the original June 30 rallies and "birthday in the streets" demonstrations each June 30 after that. Nationwide campaigns revolved around local groups demanding for resources such as supplemental welfare checks to pay for back-to-school clothing for children of welfare recipients as well as the demand for retail credit at major department stores for NWRO members.

By August 1969, an NWRO convention in Detroit estimated roughly 20,000 dues paying members of the organization, and thus roughly 75,000 family members total affected by the movement. Most of the members of the movement were poor, mostly black women. By 1971, NWRO included 540 separate welfare rights organizations.

In 1972, Johnnie Tillmon was appointed executive director of the NWRO after George Wiley's resignation. Wiley had been trying to mobilize the working poor, whereas Tillmon tried to align with the feminist movement. Tillmon's 1972 essay, "Welfare Is a Woman's Issue," which was published in Ms., emphasized women's right to adequate income, regardless of whether they worked in a factory or at home raising children. The funding for the NWRO had gone down by the time Tillmon became the executive director, and the NWRO ended in bankruptcy in March 1975; however, Tillmon continued fighting for welfare rights at the state and local levels.

== Organizational levels ==
=== Local level ===
Each local affiliate of the NWRO was fully autonomous. The group was allowed to decide on its own program, make its own decisions, organize itself, and raise money by itself, while the NWRO remained a resource for them. The only power the NWRO had over an affiliate was the power in which to recognize them as an affiliate. The national constitution required that members of local affiliates include a majority of welfare recipients and that all but ten percent of the members be people of low income. Each local group had to be independent of any larger organization that could restrict its freedom of action.

=== National level ===
Members elected lay leaders who had the power to dismiss the staff director. There were biennial conventions of delegates from all local groups in the country which elected a national executive board. The NCC consisted of delegates from each state that contained a local welfare rights affiliate. It met four times a year to make the basic policy decisions of the NWRO. The national staff was responsible to the national executive board, which was representative of the largest states within the movement because they contained the most delegates.
