= Lloyd Ohlin =

American sociologist and criminologist

- Born: August 27, 1918; Belmont, Massachusetts, US
- Died: December 6, 2008 (aged 90); Santa Barbara, California, US
- Education: Brown University
- Alma mater: Indiana University Bloomington
- Scientific career
- Fields: Sociology and criminology
- Institutions: Harvard Law School

Lloyd Edgar Ohlin (August 27, 1918 – December 6, 2008) was an American sociologist and criminologist who taught at Harvard Law School, Columbia University, and the University of Chicago. He studied the causes and effects of crime and punishment, especially as it related to youthful offenders and delinquents.

== Life and career ==
Ohlin was born on August 27, 1918, in Belmont, Massachusetts, the son of Elise (Nelson) and Emil Ohlin, Swedish-born immigrants. He received a bachelor's degree in 1940 from Brown University and was awarded a master's degree in sociology from Indiana University Bloomington in 1942. He later earned a Ph.D. in sociology from the University of Chicago in 1954.

He served in the United States Army during World War II, performing counterintelligence in Europe. During the Korean War, he investigated conditions in Korean prisoner-of-war camps for George Washington University's Human Resources Research Office.

From 1947 to 1953, Ohlin was a sociologist for the Illinois Parole and Pardon Board where he was responsible for interviewing prospective parolees and making recommendations to the board for their consideration. He directed the Center for Education and Research in Corrections at the University of Chicago from 1953 to 1956. He was hired by the New York School of Social Work in 1956, and was later named director of the school's research center.

Together with fellow sociologist Richard A. Cloward, Ohlin wrote Delinquency and Opportunity: A Theory of Delinquent Gangs, which rejected the prevailing assumption that delinquency resulted from the irresponsibility of youths and argued that it was a symptom of poverty and the lack of alternative opportunities caused by poverty and that the conditions underlying delinquency could be resolved through social programs in local communities that addressed the essential causes. As he told the New York Post in 1961, "The boy who joins a gang isn’t in a rut. He has aspirations but no place to go with them."

In the late 1950s, Ohlin was part of the development of Mobilization for Youth. This $12.9 million antipoverty program was initiated in the early 1960s to prevent delinquency on the Lower East Side of Manhattan. the program was based on principles established by Ohlin in Delinquency and Opportunity, offering job training, psychological counseling, drug treatment, and legal assistance as part of a program that became a prototype for future antipoverty programs administered by the United States government.

He joined the faculty of Harvard Law School in 1967 where he was one of the few faculty members who was not an attorney. As research director of Harvard's Center for Criminal Justice, Ohlin focused on investigating the risks that imprisonment poses, especially for young people. In a February 1968 speech in Boston delivered at the 15th annual Legislative Clearing House, Ohlin stated that "by doing nothing but processing children who get into trouble routinely through an overcrowded correctional system, we do more to develop than to stop career criminals". He taught at Harvard Law School until his retirement in 1982, after which he served as the Touroff-Glueck emeritus professor of criminal justice until his death.

In addition to his stint as president of the American Society of Criminology, Ohlin devoted time to public service in several presidential administrations, including as a special consultant on delinquency to the United States Department of Health, Education, and Welfare under John F. Kennedy, as associate director of the President's Commission on Law Enforcement and Administration of Justice under Lyndon B. Johnson and as a member of the National Institute of Law Enforcement and Criminal Justice under Jimmy Carter.

Ohlin died at the age of 90 on December 6, 2008, at his home in Santa Barbara, California, of Shy–Drager syndrome, a neurodegenerative disease.
