= George Wiley =

American civil rights activist (1931–1973)

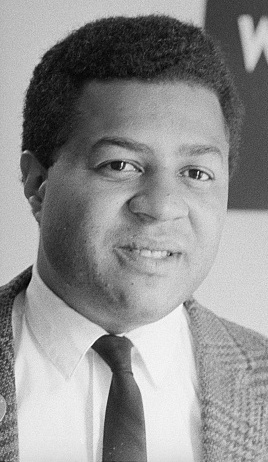
- George Wiley in 1967
- Born: February 26, 1931; Bayonne, New Jersey, U.S.
- Died: August 8, 1973 (aged 42); Chesapeake Bay, Maryland, U.S.
- Body discovered: Chesapeake Beach, Maryland, U.S.
- Education: University of Rhode Island (BS); Cornell University (PhD)
- Employer(s): Syracuse University; University of California, Berkeley
- Children: 2, including Maya

George Alvin Wiley (February 26, 1931 – August 8, 1973) was an American chemist and civil rights leader. He was a founder of the National Welfare Rights Organization.

== Early life and education ==
Wiley was born in Bayonne, New Jersey, the son of a postal clerk and one of six children. Wiley's family eventually moved to Warwick, Rhode Island.

Wiley earned his undergraduate degree at the University of Rhode Island in 1953. Working with Jerrold Meinwald, he received a doctorate in organic chemistry from Cornell University in 1957. Wiley fulfilled a six-month ROTC obligation as a first lieutenant in the United States Army at Fort Lee, Virginia; and subsequently accepted a post-doctoral fellowship at the University of California, Los Angeles.

== Career ==
Wiley taught for two years at the University of California, Berkeley, whereupon he took a teaching position at Syracuse University in 1960. In November 1961, he founded the Syracuse chapter of Congress of Racial Equality. He was only the third Black faculty member at Syracuse. He later was a founder of the National Welfare Rights Organization.

He was listed on the Master list of Nixon's political opponents.

The George Wiley Award for Exceptional Performance in Organic Chemistry for students at Syracuse University is named in his honor.

== Personal life ==
Wiley married and had two children. His daughter is civil rights activist and lawyer, Maya Wiley.

== Death ==
On August 8, 1973, Wiley fell overboard while on a boat with his children on the Chesapeake Bay. On August 12, 1973, Wiley's body was found on the shore of Chesapeake Beach, Maryland after a three-day search.
