= Jody Miller (criminologist) =

American criminologist

- Occupations: Feminist criminologist, academic
- Title: Professor and Faculty Chair
- Awards: Fellow (2014), American Society of Criminology

Academic background
- Education: University of Southern California, Ohio State University, Ohio University

Academic work
- Discipline: Criminologist
- Sub-discipline: Feminist criminology, Qualitative research methods, Criminology, Sociology
- Institutions: School of Criminal Justice, Rutgers University (Newark)
- Notable works: Getting Played: African American Girls, Urban Inequality, and Gendered Violence; One of the Guys: Girls, Gangs and Gender
- Website: https://rscj.newark.rutgers.edu/people/faculty/miller-jody/

Jody Miller is a feminist criminology professor at the School of Criminal Justice at the Rutgers University (Newark). Her education includes: B.S. in journalism from Ohio University, 1989 (summa cum laude); M.A. in sociology from Ohio University, 1990; M.A. in women's studies at Ohio State University, 1991; and her Ph.D. in sociology from the University of Southern California in 1996. She specializes in feminist theory and qualitative research methods. Her research focuses on gender, crime and victimization, in the context of urban communities, the commercial sex industry, sex tourism, and youth gangs. Miller has also been elected as the vice president of the American Society of Criminology for 2015, the executive counselor of the American Society of Criminology for 2009–2011, as well as received the University of Missouri-St. Louis Chancellor's Award for Excellence in Service in 2007.

In 2011, Miller worked as a visiting fellow, Netherlands Institute for the Study of Crime and Law Enforcement, Amsterdam, Netherlands. In 2014, she was named a Fellow of the American Society of Criminology. She received the Distinguished Scholar Award, Division on Women and Crime, American Society of Criminology in 2010. She won the 2010 Distinguished Contribution to Scholarship Book Award, Race, Gender, and Class Section, American Sociological Association. Jody Miller was also the prestigious award winner of the 2009 Coramae Richey Mann Award, Division on People of Color and Crime, American Society of Criminology. Miller was also a finalist for the 2008 C. Wright Mills Award, Society for the Study of Social Problems, for Getting Played: African American Girls, Urban Inequality, and Gendered Violence (NYU Press, 2008).

== Research overview ==
Miller's line of research in part emphasizes the sex trade industry in Sri Lanka. She has also examined the Sex Industry in the Netherlands. In addition, much of her work follows another line of research that focuses on females in gangs, as well as victimization experiences of urban African American girls. She looks particularly at female involvement in gangs due to the lack of research there is in this line of study. In particular, Miller makes a strong motion towards getting other feminist researchers to help contribute to the general study of gender and crime, particularly in underrepresented or unexplored areas of research.

== Major works ==
The following are two select article reviews of Miller's work:

=== One of the Guys: Girls, Gangs and Gender. New York: Oxford University Press. ===
This book, One of the Guys: Girls, Gangs and Gender is of particular importance on two levels; Randall G. Shelden reviews Miller's goals for this book:

What is especially unique about Miller's study is that it is comparative in two ways: she includes two different cities – St. Louis and Columbus – and compares gang and non-gang girls. She presents comparative data about important socio-economic variables in each city (percent unemployed, percent living in poverty, etc.) and how some of the differences – and similarities – relate to gang participation.

In the opening chapter by Miller, she describes the old paradigms that continue to restructure feminist criminology in new ways. Miller states that the "...[Helpless] victim characteristic of early writings on girls in gangs and women who offend has been replaced by a 'resisting' one. Here women's criminal offending and girls' participation in gangs are characterized as response or resistance to victimization. And this is no doubt part of what's going on. Nonetheless, it's only part. The overemphasis on women's gendered victimization—and with it, the accentuation of gender differences—continues to permeate much of the feminist literature on women and crime, to the exclusion of other important issues."

In the foreword of her book, Malcolm W. Klein, a fellow leading researcher in American street gangs, states that Miller's work is of high importance in the understanding of street gangs, in particular to this research, the formation of urban female street gangs and memberships:

I am grateful for the publication of Dr. Miller's One of the Guys for many reasons. I am grateful because it significantly advances our understand of female street gang members, because the research was so deliberately designed to yield comparative findings about these young women, because the author's gendered perspectives is both palatable and informative, because the volume covers a host of issues I've long felt were important in gang research generally, and because the author uses her respondents' own words to illustrate her discoveries. There is more here, in my view, than in any single work yet produced on the nature and place of gang girls in America.

This is the primary setup for the rest of Miller's work.

In the conclusion to Miller's book, she states a final summary to her book:

In this book, I most often have places young women's gang involvement within the context of crime and criminology, specifically within the broader criminological literature on youth gangs. I stand by done so, as I believe I've situated girls' gangs within the space that the young women I spoke to placed them. In addition, this approach has allowed me to make important contributions about both overlaps and differences in girls' and boys' experiences within gangs. While I have highlighted the broader contexts of their lives...I believe nonetheless that there's more to be does in this regard. I have worked to reveal the humanity of the young women who took part in this study and have taken particular effort to situate them in a more complex way within their gangs. However, with my approach inevitably came sacrifices, most notably, a limited ability to describe these young women's histories and lives beyond 'life in the gang.' Future work should broaden our understanding of the life contexts of girls in gangs. My hope is that the insights provided here, and those drawn from feminist scholarship in the other disciplines, will help frame the parameters of future research—bridging the gender similarities/differences divide and documenting girls' victimization, resistance, and agency in ways that capture their full humanity.

=== "Violence Against Urban African American Girls: Challenges for Feminist Advocacy". New York: Oxford University Press ===
In this article, "Violence Against Urban African American Girls: Challenges for Feminist Advocacy" (in the Journal of Contemporary Criminal Justice. 24: 148–162), Miller begins the article with an opening statement of how the pioneering effects of second wave feminism have problematized the issues relating to violence against women. In this discussion, Miller describes the challenges that result from the evolution from the academia, policy and the governmental expertise on violence against women, including tendencies to narrowly frame the problem as an issue relating to public health and criminal justice; moving away from the broader, and more predominate, issues of equality and justice. Miller draws from her research on violence against African American girls in troubled urban-central neighborhoods; thus leading to her argument that feminist advocacy is the overarching goal of gendered related violence.

The notion of violence against women has gained recognition as a serious social problem; based on the advancement of second wave feminism from the 1960s and 1970s. Second wave radical feminism moves to problematize violence against women have undoubtedly succeeded based on what Miller calls stakeholders, for whom are the academics, politicians, policy makers and other practitioners that claim this problem as their own. It is from this that Miller draws her two major claims of the article. The first claim is there is a shift away from the "women-defined understandings of violence that [guide] feminist consciousness-raising efforts towards the 'expert' understandings of various stakeholders" (pg. 149). Miller expresses here that there seems to be little attention has been paid towards the social impact of the overreliance of experts and expertise in the various social / political contexts by which these understandings are recognized. The latter claim argues that there is a tendency to decouple violence against women from its 'embeddedness' in other forums of violence and structural inequalities in society and to treat various forms of violence against women as a discrete, rather than interrelated, phenomena (pg. 149).

Miller's argument draws on a qualitative study/investigation that she had recently completed (in 2008) on violence against adolescent African American girls in disadvantaged urban neighborhoods. D. Miller states that in order for her to start this line of research a, "...[S]ystematic, ecologically embedded [approach is] necessary. This means offering remedies that attend to the root causes of urban disadvantage, addressing the resultant costs and consequences and also improving institutional support for challenging gender inequalities and strengthening young women's efficacy" (pg. 154-55). Miller states that in keeping with the feminist advocates' faith in mind, youths themselves offer a parallel of recommendations concerning changes that they would like to see in their lives; she lists four of those changes that these youth need to see happen in their lives (155–57):

- Improving Neighborhoods – From her findings, Miller believes that since public policies have created certain concerted disadvantages for these youth, new policies can also improve the situation by stabilizing communities. It is here that Miller believes that a fostered of collective efficacy of community members through the production of social ties can, in turn, can increase protective mechanisms; such as the willingness to intervene on behalf of neighbors and monitor the behavior of youth in general.
- Increasing institutional accountability – This recommendation by Miller focuses on the aspect of the police involvement with troubled neighborhoods. Though policing cannot end violence against women, Miller acknowledges that police can create strategies that treat community members with respect rather than suspicion, engage residents and work to identify and meet their needs, and are more sensitive to the overall dynamics and significance of violence against women would go far in making law enforcement seem more credible/accountable.
- Stabilizing community agencies and facilitating relationships with caring adults – There are two aspects here that Miller would like to see changes in. First is community programs should engage in structured activities, jobs, and job training that can offer opportunities that serve as alternatives to the street. Much of findings in Miller's study emerged when youth participated in both unsupervised parties and delinquency. By providing young people with alternative opportunities, Miller believes that it could avert them from the social contexts that heighten the risk for violence against young women. Secondly, youth often lack stable relationships with adults that they could in turn to in times of need. Miller's findings state that young girls were suspicious of victim services which they associated with social service agencies. It is found that stable and trusted community agencies are an important avenue for providing young women with the support and resources they need when they are victimized.
- Changing gender ideologies and challenging gender inequality – According to Miller's findings, without broader social or institutional supports for addressing violence, the youth saw that the ultimate responsibility for protecting themselves was heavily relied upon themselves. An important goal here is to find ways by which young women generalize sympathetic recognition of their own friend's experiences to women in general. The way to achieve this goal is through a promising look at education and prevention; by bringing such programming to schools and community agencies, it may help young women recognize the commonalities of their own experiences in relation to gender inequalities.

== Research articles ==
The following articles and abstracts reflect Miller's work in Sri Lanka:

Miller, Jody and Kristin Carbone-Lopez. 2013. ―Gendered Carceral Regimes in Sri Lanka: Colonial Laws, Post-Colonial Practices, and the Social Control of Sex Workers.‖ Signs: Journal of Women in Culture and Society. 39(1). (Special issue on Women, Gender and Prison). Detailing how Sri Lanka's Methsevana State House of Detention serves as a "site of gendered social control," Jody Miller and Kristin Carbone-Lopez "trace how vestiges of British colonial law intersect with Sinhala Buddhist nationalism, militarization, and the gendered liberalization of Sri Lanka's economy to heighten national anxieties about women's sexuality and sexual practices, culminating in penal excesses directed at those engaged in commercial sex."

Miller, Jody and Andrea Nichols. 2013. ―Identity, Sexuality, and Commercial Sex among Sri Lankan Nachchi.‖ Sexualities. (Special issue on LGBT Sex Work). This article investigates the complex and contradictory ways in which gender identity, sexuality, and desire are configured in nachchi understandings of their lives in Sri Lanka. Nachchi was an insider term used by a group of sex workers best conceptualized using western understandings as both transgender and homosexual: nachchi celebrate their feminine gendered subjectivity, but also embrace key facets of their biological 'maleness,'and are ardent in their sexual desire for men. We examine the relationships between nachchi gender and sexual subjectivities, including how they compare and distinguish themselves from women and men. Particularly in the context of transactional sexual exchanges, we investigate the intersections of economics, desire, stigma and exploitation in shaping nachchi experiences. Identity, sexuality and commercial sex among Sri Lankan nachchi

Miller, Jody. 2011. ―Beach Boys or Sexually Exploited Children? Competing Narratives of Sex Tourism and their Impact on Young Men in Sri Lanka's Sex Industry.‖ Crime, Law and Social Change. 56: 485–508. Sex trafficking and the commercial sexual exploitation of children (CSEC) are widely identified as global social problems, but each remain politically charged, especially given the disproportionate emphasis on sexual slavery. The current investigation is a case study of CSEC within the context of Sri Lanka's international tourism industry. I draw from data collected during a multi-year field study to analyze and compare those understandings of sex tourism and CSEC driven by local "moral crusaders"—which dominated policy and public discussion—with the experiences of adolescent boys and young men who participated in these markets. Moral claims-making, focused as it was on cultural purity, morality, Western perversions, sexual slavery, and deviance, shifted attention away from the global political and economic contexts in which transactional sex took place. This resulted in both distortions and harms to marginalized youth in tourism communities, and a failure to address the economic realities of those involved in the informal tourism economy, including transactional sex with tourists. The current study thus adds additional support to the concerns raised by scholars and activists about the scope, nature, and impact of efforts to ameliorate commercial sexual exploitation, including the harms that result from narrow foci on individual deviance and sexual slavery.

Miller, Jody. 2002. ―Violence and Coercion in Sri Lanka's Commercial Sex Industry: Intersections of Gender, Sexuality, Culture and the Law.‖ Violence Against Women. 8(9): 1045–1074. This study examines the local conditions facing commercial sex workers in Colombo, Sri Lanka. Based on findings from a 3-year field comparative field study, the author investigates the widespread nature of violence, coercion, and harassment against women (including transgender women) and gay men in an illicit sex market whose primary clientele are Sri Lankan men. Specifically, the author examines the relationship between cultural definitions of gender/sexuality and the implementation of existing legal frameworks and its impact on the treatment and experiences of sex workers. The author provides an overview of pathways into the sex industry as well as variations in the nature of coercion, violence, and abuse across industry sectors, focusing specifically on street-level versus "indoor" (i.e., brothels, lodges, massage clinics) sectors of the local sex industry. Violence and Coercion in Sri Lanka's Commercial Sex Industry: Intersections of Gender, Sexuality, Culture, and the Law

Miller, Jody. 2000. ―The Protection of ‗Human Subjects' in Street Ethnography: Ethical and Practical Considerations from a Field Study in Sri Lanka.‖ Focaal. 36: 53–68. (Special Issue on Contemporary Street Ethnography)

== Humanitarian work ==
=== The University of Missouri-St. Louis tsunami reconstruction project ===
During her tenure as a Professor of Criminology & Criminal Justice at the University of Missouri-St. Louis (1998–2010), Miller began a new line of research examining the commercial sex trade in Sri Lanka, a notable location in South Asia for sex tourists seeking young children as their victims. She was supported by a Fulbright fellowship for this research, where she has acquired here use of fieldwork and interviewing techniques for her research. Given Miller's close relational ties to Sri Lanka, the Asian tsunami of December 2004 hit close to home. Immediately following the devastating tsunami, Miller began private fundraising relief efforts, which sequentially lead to colleague Dr. Bob Bursik donating his trademark ponytail to her cause; a local charity event that raised $4,000. Capitalizing on this opportunity, Miller sought out to seek help from the university as well. Working closely with colleague Dr. Joel Glassman and staff at the Center for International Studies, have developed the University of Missouri-St. Louis Tsunami Reconstruction Project. In its formation, Drs. Miller and Glassman had designed this project to set up to create and maintain three goals:

- To develop a tangible long-term project in which the UMSL community could make a significant contribution to help build a sustainable future for children and communities affected by the tsunami;
- To include UMSL students in the reconstruction effort, in order to foster their engaged global civic participation;
- To develop long-term international exchange between UMSL and the educational community in Sri Lanka.

== Contribution to feminist criminology ==
In the foreword of the book One of the Guys, Malcolm W. Klein briefly discuss about Miller's contribution to feminist criminology in how female gangs are related to male gangs:

One can study male gangs without reference to their female constituents, but only at a cost to a world that does, after all, contain two sexes. Anyone can study female gangs or gang members—as many have done—without reference to the male in their worlds. But the fault is the same, as is the loss. Dr. Miller's research, clearly emphasizing the perspective of her female respondents, makes it clear nonetheless that many of those perspectives are affected by necessary accommodations to male gang members. There is a serious attempt here, in the author's words, 'to expand feminist accounts of female offenders by providing a nuanced portrayal of the complex gender experiences of girls in gangs.'

The quote from Klein illustrates how feminist advocates have been trying to answer why there is such a research gap between studies on male gangs and members compared to female gangs and members. There is little to no research about females in this category of feminist theory; Miller's research is an attempt to fill the empty research on female gangs and members. Her research is an attempt to get other feminist researchers to contribute to this area of research to help level the lack of research for female gangs and members with their male counterparts.

== Bibliography of important works ==
The following is a selection of monographs, edited books, and referred journals that Miller has contributed to; for more works by Miller, click here to see the rest of her C.V.

- Brunson, Rod K.; Miller, Jody (2009). "Schools, Neighborhoods, and Adolescent Conflict: A Situational Examination of Reciprocal Dynamics". Justice Quarterly. 26 (2): 183–210. doi:10.1080/07418820802245060. S2CID 143827140.
- Brunson, Rod K.; Miller, Jody (2006). "Gender, Race, and Urban Policing: The Experience of African American Youths". Gender & Society. 20 (4): 531–552. doi:10.1177/0891243206287727. S2CID 143620136.
- Cobbina, Jennifer; Miller, Jody; Brunson, Rod K. (2008). "Gender, Neighborhood Risk, and Risk Avoidance Strategies among Urban African American Youth". Criminology. 46 (3): 673–709. doi:10.1111/j.1745-9125.2008.00122.x.
- Egley, Arlen, Cheryl L. Maxson, Jody Miller and Malcolm W. Klein, eds. 2006. The Modern Gang Reader, 3rd Edition. Los Angeles: Roxbury Publishing Company.
- Miller, Jody. 2008. Getting Played: African American Girls, Urban Inequality, and Gendered Violence. New York: New York University Press.
- Miller, Jody (2003). "Gender, Crime and (In)Justice: Introduction to the Special Issue". Journal of Contemporary Ethnography. 31 (1): 3–8. doi:10.1177/0891241602238936. S2CID 140950680. (Guest Editor)
- Miller, Jody (2002). "The Strengths and Limits of 'Doing Gender' For Understanding Street Crime". Theoretical Criminology. 6 (4): 433–460. doi:10.1177/136248060200600403. S2CID 62881186.
- Miller, Jody (2002). "Violence and Coercion in Sri Lanka's Commercial Sex Industry: Intersections of Gender, Sexuality, Culture and the Law". Violence Against Women. 8 (9): 1045–1074. doi:10.1177/107780102401101737. S2CID 73230610.
- Miller, Jody. 2001. One of the Guys: Girls, Gangs and Gender. New York: Oxford University Press.
- Miller, Jody, Cheryl L. Maxson and Malcolm W. Klein, eds. 2001. The Modern Gang Reader, 2nd Edition. Los Angeles: Roxbury Publishing Company.
- Miller, Jody. 2000. The Protection of 'Human Subjects' in Street Ethnography: Ethical and Practical Considerations from a Field Study in Sri Lanka. Focaal. 36: 53–68. (Special Issue on Contemporary Street Ethnography).
- Miller, Jody and Christopher W. Mullins. 2006. Feminist Theories of Crime. In Taking Stock: The Status of Criminological Theory, edited by Francis T. Cullen, John Wright and Kristie Blevins. Advances in Criminological Theory (Freda Adler and William Laufer, series editors). 15: 217–250.
- Miller, Jody; White, Norman A. (2003). "Gender and Adolescent Relationship Violence: A Contextual Examination". Criminology. 41 (4): 1207–1248. doi:10.1111/j.1745-9125.2003.tb01018.x. S2CID 145135326.
- Miller, Jody and Puny Gunawardena, eds. 2009. Tea & Me: Estate Life through the Eyes of Children. Colombo, Sri Lanka: Chakra (Pvt) Ltd/UM-St. Louis Sri Lankan Educational Fund.
- Mullins, Christopher W. and Jody Miller. 2008. Temporal, Situational and Interactional Features of Women's Violent Conflicts. Australian and New Zealand Journal of Criminology. 41: 36–62. (Invited article, Special Issue on Current Approaches to Understanding Female Offending).
- Peterson, Dana; Miller, Jody; Esbensen, Finn-Aage (2001). "The Impact of Sex Composition on Gangs and Gang Member Delinquency". Criminology. 39 (2): 411–439. doi:10.1111/j.1745-9125.2001.tb00928.x.
- Zhang, Sheldon; Chin, Ko-Lin; Miller, Jody (2007). "Women's Participation in Chinese Transnational Human Smuggling: A Gendered Market Perspective". Criminology. 45 (3): 699–733. doi:10.1111/j.1745-9125.2007.00085.x.
