= Climate change and crime =

Research suggests a complex relationship

Research shows several connections between climate change and crime. Some studies indicate an increase in crime rates, especially violent crimes while others show the evidence is mixed, finding weak or inconsistent correlations. Researchers focus on several factors that might influence rime rates like temperature volatility, seasonal variations, and local infrastructure. Activities and legislation that allow for environmental crimes to happen, fuel climate change, further impacting crime patterns.

== Dynamics ==
There are various theories to explain the relationship between rising temperatures and crime rates.

=== Temperature-aggression theory ===
The temperature-aggression theory, also known as the biological theory, claims higher temperatures can lead to increased levels of stress in individuals, potentially resulting in aggressive behaviors. As temperatures rise, people may become more prone to frustration and anger, which could contribute to an increase in violent crimes such as assaults and homicides. Other studies have explored this concept, examining whether heat-induced aggression correlates with higher rates of violent crime. Temperature aggression theory relies on examining historical data to identify correlations between abnormally high temperatures and increased rates of violent crimes over time. Patterns in crime data across different seasons or during specific weather events can indicate whether violent crime rates increase during hotter periods. Other variables - time of day, location, and demographics can also be influences.

=== Routine activity theory ===
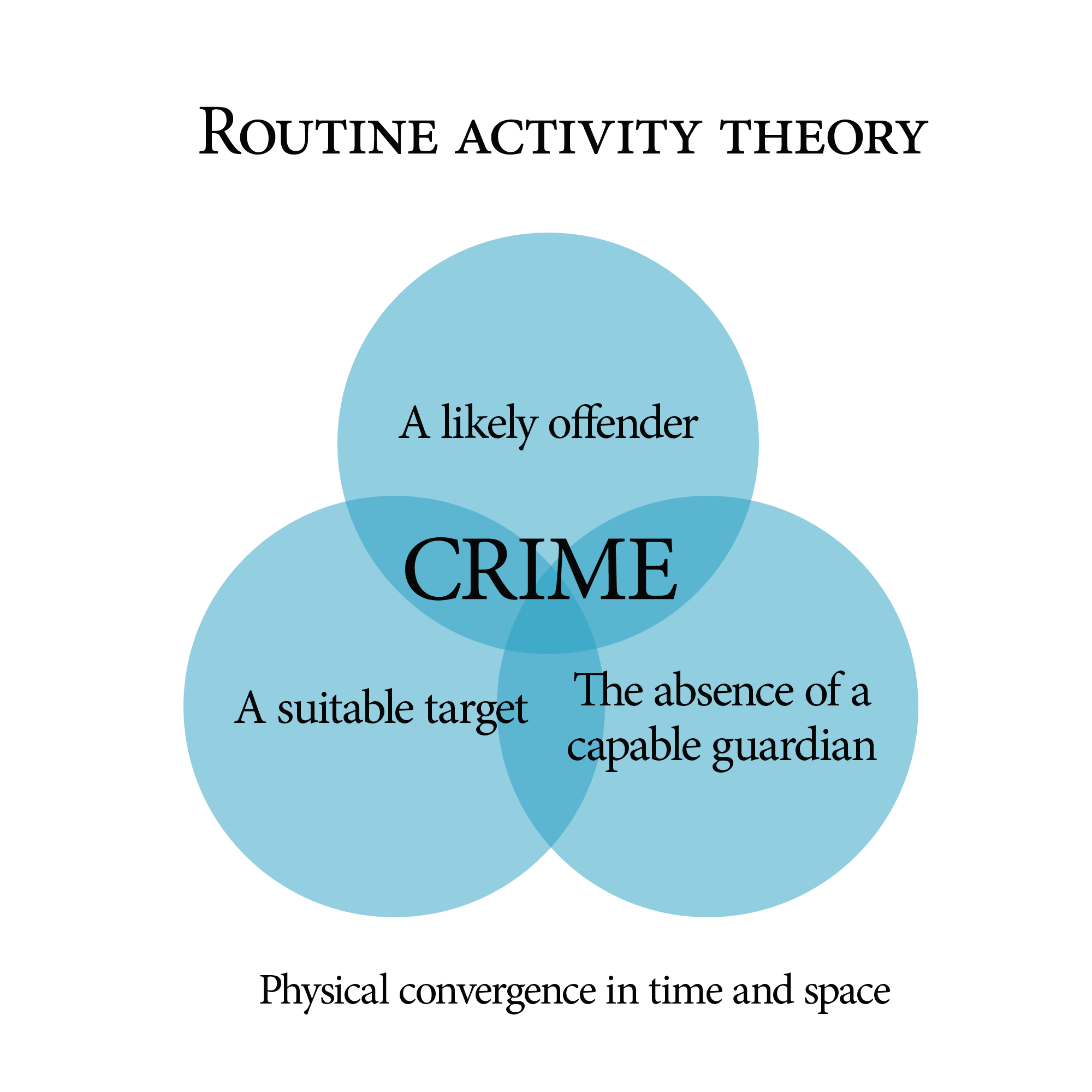
A graphical model of the Routine activity theory (developed by Marcus Felson and Lawrence E. Cohen).

The routine activity theory states that crime is more likely to occur when three conditions are met: a motivated offender, a suitable target, and a lack of capable guardianship. Warmer weather encourages outdoor activities and social interactions. This creates opportunities for motivated offenders to find suitable targets where people leave goods or property unattended. The routine activity theory does not imply that higher temperatures directly cause crime, but rather it underscores that environmental factors, affect human behavior to create conditions conducive to criminal activity.

=== Temperature changes ===
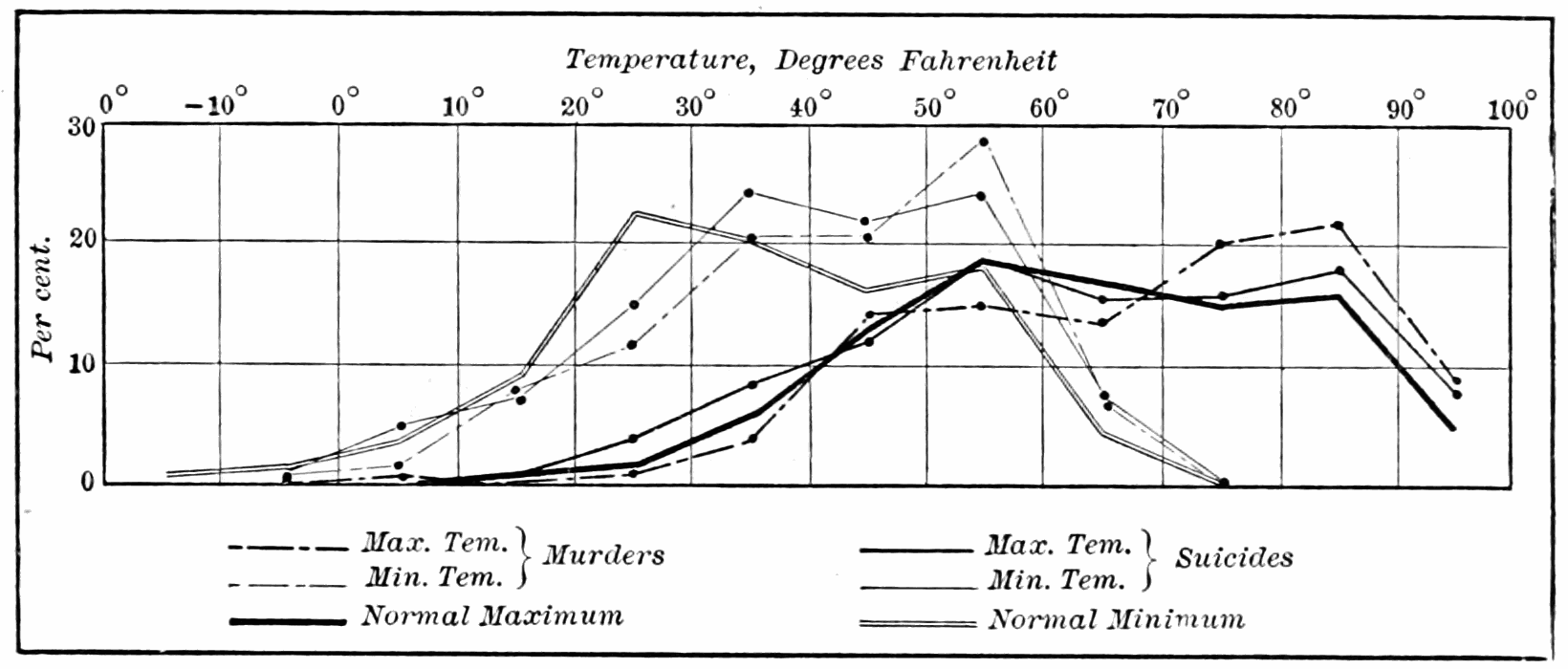
Graph showing the relationship between temperature and murder and suicide rates from 1899.

Land-ocean temperature index from 1880 to present. The solid black line is the global annual mean temperature showing the overall increase and variability in temperature (created by NASA).

Several studies have examined the relationship between temperature and crime.

- The "climate change-temperature-crime hypothesis" across fifteen U.S. cities over a fourteen year period found that most correlations between temperature and crime were insignificant, which the researchers said suggested that other social, economic, or environmental factors might be more influential.
- One study examined the relationship between temperature and precipitation on crime in St. Louis, Missouri from 1990 to 2009, concluding that increased temperature anomalies lead to an increase in monthly crime rates. There was also correlation among violent crimes, like aggravated assaults, higher temperatures, and a shorter rainy season. Although this connection was mild, they found a stronger relationship between the temperature anomalies during El Nino/La Nina cycles and conflict.
- Another study examined annual temperatures and crime rates in the U.S., finding a correlation with specific crime types, such as assault and robbery. Others, like murder, showed no significant relationship.
- In 2021 Trujillo and Howley published a study that found higher temperatures yielded an increased in interpersonal violence, while higher humidity and precipitation were linked to decreased violence in Barranquilla, Colombia. The study supported the general aggression model and concluded that weather factors were important in urban areas.

== Resource scarcity ==
Climate change is said to increase strain by exposing individuals to a range of stressors conducive to crime. These stressors include extreme weather events, food and freshwater shortages, habitat changes, and forced migration. Robert Agnew’s model suggests that climate change will likely become a significant driver of crime due to its layered effects on society like unpredictability, reduced social control, weakened social support, and increased opportunities for crime.

One study investigated the effects of rainfall fluctuations on dowry-related deaths in India. Studies concluded that a one standard deviation decrease in annual rainfall from the local mean is associated with a 7.8% increase in reported dowry deaths. Wet shocks, periods of excessive rainfall, reportedly have no significant impact on dowry deaths. The study also found a deficit in rainfall is associated with a 32% increase in domestic violence incidents. This may indicate a possible connection between economic stress due to poor agricultural yields during droughts and higher crime rates, particularly domestic abuse and dowry-related violence. Dry periods correlate with domestic violence and kidnapping/abduction cases in the study, but they do not affect burglary and robbery rates according to the study in a significant way.

A different perspective on resource scarcity and crime at a larger scale looks at climate change litigation to avoid conflicts and larger atrocities. Yvonne Breitwieser-Faria's claims that successful litigation can address environmental and economic stresses. Similarly employing sanctions for criminal activities contributing to climate change as well as increasing accountability for environmental wrongdoing could help.

== Environmental crimes ==
Environmental crimes like illegal waste dumping, deforestation, and emissions accelerate climate change. Research points to rising temperatures and natural disasters as being associated with a higher occurrence of violent crimes. This association could be due to several factors: natural disasters leading to increased social disruption, economic instability, and resource scarcity. The environmental degradation left in the wake could push vulnerable communities into poverty, instability, contribute to conditions that foster violent crime.

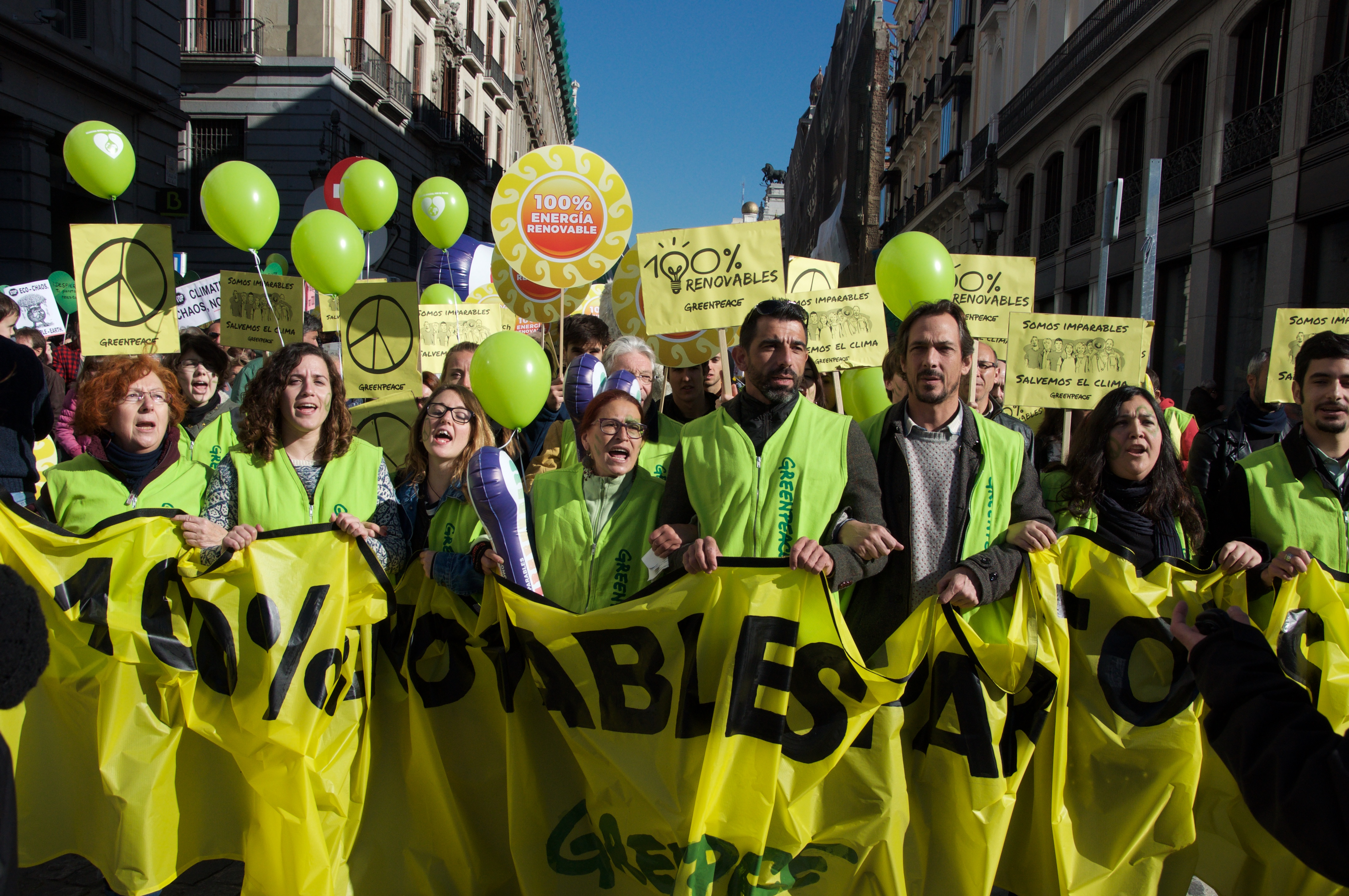
Protestors at the Greenpeace Climate March from 2015 in Madrid.

One policy strategy is advocacy and education. Organizations like Greenpeace and events like Earth Day work to promote sustainability and educate people about climate change.

== Geography ==
Geographic characteristics can influence crime patterns. Factors like local climate, urbanization, infrastructure, and socioeconomic conditions can dictate how weather-related changes affect crime.

One study from North Bay, Ontario, a small town with a population around 50,000, showed temperature influenced the distribution of thefts and assaults. Break and enters were influenced by calendar events.
