= Feminist school of criminology =

School of criminology

The Feminist School of Criminology is a school dedicated to the studies on female offenders, victims and women in the criminal system in an effort to understand the causes, motives and aftermaths of female criminality.

The feminist school of criminology is a school of criminology developed in the late 1960s and into the 1970s as a reaction to the general disregard and discrimination of women in the traditional study of crime. It is the view of the feminist school of criminology that a majority of criminological theories were developed through studies on male subjects and focused on male criminality, and that criminologists often would "add women and stir" rather than develop separate theories on female criminality.

Feminist criminology focuses on women offenders, women victims, and women in the criminal justice system in order to understand the causes, trends, and results of female criminality. Key issues within the feminist school of criminology include the role of sex and sexism in sentencing and imprisonment, the role of victimization in women's lives, and the increase in the number of incarcerated women despite declining crime rates.

== History ==
Criminology is the scientific study of the causes, correction, and prevention of crime and those who commit it. Though this field of study had its origins in the late 19th century, it was not until the late 1960s and 1970s that the feminist school of criminology emerged. A response to the then-current mainstream criminology's focus on male offenders and victims, feminist criminologists sought to bring an understanding of women offenders, women victims, and women working in the criminal justice system.

=== Early theories on female deviancy ===
The earliest theories about women's criminality focused mainly on psychological and physiological traits, rather than social or economic ones. These theories, most advanced by male scholars and criminologists, have been heavily criticized for drawing on assumptions on "the nature of women", and many have since been discredited. Italian criminologist Cesare Lombroso applied phrenology and anthropological criminology to his theorizing on female crime, separating the "normal woman" from the "criminal woman", the latter of whom was seen as less feminine and therefore more likely to be criminal. American sociologist W.I. Thomas advanced the idea that delinquent women engage in sexual deviance (such as prostitution) to manipulate men's sexual desires in order to get what they want.

==== General Strain Theory ====
Criminologist Robert Agnew attempted to understand the difference between men's and women's crime rates through General Strain theory. He theorized that men and women experienced different types of strain (pressure or stress, be it physical, financial, emotional, etc.) and responded accordingly. While men seemed more prone to react with violent or property crimes, women were viewed to respond with more self-destructive criminality, such as drug abuse.

=== Early feminist criminological theory ===
French-Canadian criminologist Marie-Andrée Bertrand and British sociologist Frances Mary Heidensohn are among those acknowledged by most as pioneers in the school of feminist criminology. Heidensohn's article "The Deviance of Women: A Critique and An Enquiry" (1968) is credited as the first critique of mainstream criminology's failure to include women in their studies, stating that "the deviance of women is one of the areas of human behavior most notably ignored in sociological literature" and called for more research to be done on female deviance.

Early works of feminist criminological theory included Freda Adler's Sisters in Crime: The Rise of the New Female Criminal (1975), which linked female criminality to the ongoing feminist liberation movement, theorizing that with more opportunities outside of the home, women were also given more opportunities to participate in deviant behaviors. This theory is sometimes known as the "Emancipation Theory". Rita J. Simon's book "Women and Crime", also published in 1975, echoed this theory. While both influential works in the field, Adler and Simon's theoretical linkage has been criticized by many feminists, including Carol Smart and Meda Chesney-Lind for bringing about a "moral panic" and fear regarding women's liberation by, in Chesney-Lind's words, "threatening those who aspire for equality with the images of the witch, the bitch, and the whore."

Nevertheless, Adler and Simon's concept of the "new female criminal" inspired further research by feminist and non-feminist researchers alike. Most tests by non-feminist criminologist discredited the theory, while others found economic marginalization to be a stronger link to female crime. These results, however, came years after Marxist-feminist Dorie Klein called attention to the lack of economic and social factors considered in feminist criminological research of the time.

=== Standpoint epistemology ===
In order to subvert the gender-blind criminological theory of the time, feminists in the late 1970's and early 1980's utilized the standpoint theory, which asserts that one's perspectives are formed based on their experiences. Research of this nature sought to understand female criminality by examining the lives and histories of women caught up in the criminal justice system. Common themes emerged in many of these women's narratives, including poverty, addiction, homelessness, and sexual abuse. This overarching presence of abuse led to countless studies on the link between victimization and criminalization and the ultimate theory that women's deviant behaviors could be understood as a way of coping with this abuse.

Standpoint epistemologies have been criticized for overgeneralizing women, accepting the above results as true for all women. Other feminist works take issue with the hyperfocus on the role of abuse in women's lives, arguing that these theories put women responsible for how they react to abuse, as well as justify imprisoning women who may have a greater need for treatment to deal with abuse. Activist and scholar Julia Chinyere Oparah adds that standpoint theory "sidesteps the question of why the state responds to abused women with punishment". Regardless of the criticisms, standpoint theory-rooted research is credited as an instrumental tool in shifting feminist criminology away from the mainstream criminology.

== Feminist theories on crime ==
=== Carceral feminism ===
A carceral feminist is a feminist that relies on the criminal justice system to address social problems and gender inequalities, such as violence against women and sentencing for sexual offenders. Carceral feminists, mainly consisting of radical, liberal, and/or white feminists, believe that a significant impact can be made on violence against women through increased and strengthened legislation, more police presence, and expansion of the penal system, especially in regards to sex offenders.

=== Abolitionist feminism ===
Considered an antithesis to carceral feminism, abolitionist feminism seeks to separate deviant behavior from the established criminal justice system, a system that they believe does little to address the roots of crime in society. Abolitionism is described as challenging "conventional definitions of crime and the law, while defying official views of the meanings and effects of punishment". Abolitionists assert that "crime" as it is understood, only exists within the laws that define it, and those laws are created to imprison and isolate members of the "unproductive" population. Penal abolitionists look to the elimination of prisons to solve this problem, though other abolitionists warn that when crime is only viewed as a product of prisons or institutions, "they stunt abolitionist understandings in manners akin to pushing against a 500 year old tree from its trunk and expecting it to topple over without any account for the roots that hold it firmly in the ground." Abolitionist feminist Viviane Saleh-Hanna furthers this theory by theorizing that crime exists within the intersection of racism, imperialism, and sexism – which Saleh-Hanna refers to as the R.I.P. (Racist-Imperialist-Patriarchy). Saleh-Hanna developed this theory with the implementation of her Black Feminist Hauntology. Hauntology refers to the return or persistence of elements from the past, as in the manner of a ghost, and in this case refers to the haunting of society by policies meant to dehumanize, ostracize, and punish populations of people, specifically the Black community. Systems that sought to criminalize and punish Black people, such as slavery, Jim Crow laws, and mass incarceration are seen in this theory as an ever-returning "ghost" of the Racist-Imperialist-Patriarchy.
