= Double deviance theory =

Theory in criminal justice

Double deviance theory states, "women are treated more harshly [than men] by the criminal justice system... because they are guilty of being doubly deviant. They have deviated from accepted social norms by breaking the law and deviated from gender norms which state how woman should behave."

The idea of double deviance was first introduced by feminist sociologist and criminologist Frances Heidensohn in her paper The deviance of women: a critique and an enquiry, published by the British Journal of Sociology in 1968.

== Evidence ==
In 1987, Janet B. Johnston, Thomas D. Kennedy, and I. Gayle Shuman published a study that determined that women were more likely than men to be incarcerated for robbery and assault, but less likely than men to be incarcerated for property crimes. This phenomenon was concluded to be caused by the fact that women who committed more violent crimes were deemed to have violated gender-role stereotypes.

In 2015, a study by Rob Tillyer, Richard D. Hartley, and Jeffery T. Ward found that if a woman had a limited criminal history and had overall remained in accordance with the ideal image of a woman, then she would receive a more lenient sentence. However, if it was determined that a woman had broken the law and societal norms, she would be punished more harshly than men who were charged with the same crime.

In 2012, Barbara A. Koons-Witt, Eric L. Sevigny, John D. Burrow, and Rhys Hester conducted a study that found that women with extensive criminal histories were not extended the same leniency in the criminal justice system compared to women with limited or no criminal history. Additionally, it was concluded that the women with long criminal histories are often sentenced at the same level as men.

In 2018, Melinda Tasca, Ahram Cho, Cassia Spohn, and Nancy Rodriguez analyzed how parental status affected those being sentenced. Results showed that mothers were more likely than fathers to receive longer sentences. This sentencing disparity was attributed to the fact that mothers, who are often seen as the primary caregivers, had broken the traditional gender role of women by committing a crime when their focus was supposed to be on caring for one's family.

== See also ==
- Sex differences in crime
