= Frances Heidensohn =

Academic sociologist and criminologist

Frances Mary Heidensohn
- Born: 14 July 1942 (age 84)
- Known for: Feminist criminology

Academic background
- Education: London School of Economics

Academic work
- Discipline: Sociology, criminology
- Institutions: London School of Economics (1964–74; 2005–Goldsmiths, University of London (1979–2004)

Frances Mary Heidensohn (born 14 July 1942) is a British academic sociologist and criminologist at the London School of Economics, who is acknowledged as a pioneer in feminist criminology. Her 1968 article "The Deviance of Women: A Critique and An Enquiry" was the first critique of conventional criminology from a feminist perspective.

Heidensohn has written on women and crime, gender and policing, and international comparative studies of crime. She has served as chair of an NHS Health Authority, a commissioner for judicial appointments and as a member of the Sentencing Advisory Panel.

== Career ==
Heidensohn studied sociology and, after graduating, lectured at the London School of Economics. She later worked with the Civil Service as director of studies in social policy at the Civil Service College. She joined Goldsmiths College in 1979 and was appointed to the chair in social policy in 1995. Heidensohn stayed in this role until her retirement in 2005, after which she joined the Sociology department of the London School of Economics as a visiting professor and a member of the Mannheim Centre for Criminology.

In her first article, The deviance of women: A critique and an enquiry in the British Journal of Sociology, she questioned why the low level of recorded crime by females had been largely ignored or distorted in criminological research. In it, she advocated an intensive programme of studies to analyse the logistics of the sex-crime ratio versus the applicability of the theory. She is credited as starting a feminist awakening in criminology.

She won the Sellin-Glueck award in 2004 from the American Society of Criminology, and the 2018 Outstanding Achievement Award of the British Society of Criminology. She is also a Fellow of the Academy of Social Sciences.

== Publications ==
- Women and Crime, Macmillan (1985)
- Crime and Society, Macmillan (1989)
- Women in Control? The Role of Women in Law Enforcement, Oxford University Press (1992)
- Women and Crime (2nd Edition), Macmillan (2000)
- Gender and Policing (with J. Brown), Macmillan (2000)
- Sexual Politics and Social Control, Open University Press (2000)

== See also ==
- Carol Smart
- Nicole Rafter
- Sex differences in crime
