= Gender Issues (magazine) =

American academic journal of gender and gender equity

- Editors-in-Chief: Erhan Aydin
- Categories: Gender, Feminism, Academic
- Publisher: Springer New York LLC
- Founded: 1980
- Country: United States
- Language: English
- ISSN: 1098-092X
- OCLC: 49644179

Gender Issues is an American academic journal of gender and gender equity studies. The journal primarily publishes scholarly articles and essays that examine gender roles and relationships. It also critically considers the social, economic, legal, and political impacts of those roles and relationships. It was formerly known as Feminist Issues.

== History ==
Established in 1980, the academic journal was born out of the recognition that the new feminism needed a place of its own in theoretical debate. Feminist Issues primarily aimed to illuminate the historical and social determinants behind sexism, misogyny, and many other women-related issues.

As the quarterly periodical progressively evolved, the editorial collective began to broaden the conversation by including theoretical discourses on all gender-related issues. They also started various new sections on the journal such as book reviews, letters to the editor, as well as responses from authors.

After changing its name from Feminist Issues to Gender Issues in 1998, the journal published a statement in its opening pages:

"Gender Issues is dedicated to publishing basic and applied research on the relationships between men and women; on the similarities and differences in socialization, personality, and behavior; and on the changing aspirations, roles, and statuses of women in industrial and urban societies, as well as in developing nations. Gender Issues is committed to scholarship. It has no political agenda or ideological loyalty. It welcomes controversy, and it will publish argumentative pieces and public policy recommendations so long as they have a solid empirical basis." - Rita J. Simon, Editor (Volume 16, Issue 3, 1998).

The journal's name change was mainly implemented to reflect its change in publishing frequency, editors, and mission.
