= Rita J. Simon =

American sociologist (1931–2013)

- Born: Rita Mintz; November 26, 1931; Brooklyn, New York, U.S.
- Died: July 25, 2013 (aged 81); Bloomington, Indiana, U.S.
- Occupation: Sociologist
- Spouse: Ralph James (divorced) Julian L. Simon (m. 1961; died 1998)
- Awards: Guggenheim Fellowship (1966)

Academic background
- Education: University of Wisconsin (BA); University of Chicago (PhD)
- Thesis: Jurors' reactions to alternative definitions of legal insanity (1957)

Academic work
- Sub-discipline: Sociology of law
- Institutions: University of Illinois Urbana-Champaign; American University

Rita James Simon (November 26, 1931 – July 25, 2013) was an American sociologist. A 1966 Guggenheim Fellow, she wrote dozens of books and volumes in fields such as law, sociology, and women's studies, and she was the editor for American Sociological Review, Gender Issues, and Justice Quarterly. She worked as a professor at University of Illinois Urbana-Champaign and American University.

== Early life ==
Simon was born Rita Mintz on November 26, 1931, in Brooklyn. She was the daughter of Irene and Abraham Mintz. She obtained a BA at the University of Wisconsin in 1952, and after a few years of graduate study at Cornell University, obtained a PhD from the University of Chicago in 1957. Her doctoral dissertation was titled Jurors' reactions to alternative definitions of legal insanity.

== Career ==
Simon was a research associate at University of Chicago Law School (1958-1961) and Columbia School of Social Work (1961-1963), as well as an assistant professor of sociology at UC (1959-1961). In 1963, she joined the University of Illinois Urbana-Champaign as an associate professor, before being promoted to full professor in 1968. She also worked at UI as head of the department of sociology (1968-1970) and director of the law and society program (1975-1980). In 1983, she joined American University as a professor.

Simon was the 1962-1963 Annie W. Goodrich Visiting Professor at Yale School of Nursing, as well as a visiting professor at Hebrew University of Jerusalem. In 1966, she was awarded a Guggenheim Fellowship to study sociology of law. She was a 1971 Ford Foundation Fellow. She was a 1980-1981 Center for Advanced Study fellow.

Simon wrote dozens of books and volumes in fields such as law, sociology, and women's studies. She served as the editor for American Sociological Review, Gender Issues, and Justice Quarterly.

Simon was part of a National Institute of Mental Health committee on crime and delinquency review council (1971-1974), as well as the Secretary's Commission on Opportunity in Athletics at the United States Department of Education. She also worked as a consultant-editor for JAI Press, as well as in consultancy roles in PRC Public Management Services and KOBA Associates.

== Personal life ==
Simon's first marriage was to Ralph James, before they divorced. On June 25, 1961, she married Julian L. Simon, remaining so until his death in 1998. They had three children. She lived in Chevy Chase, Maryland. She was Jewish.

Simon died of cancer on July 25, 2013, at her son's home in Bloomington, Indiana, aged 81.

== Published works ==
=== Authored books ===
- The Jury and the Defense of Insanity (1967)
- Payment for Pain and Suffering (1972, with Jeffrey O'Connell)
- American Public Opinion, 1937-1970 (1974)
- Women and Crime (1975)
- Transracial Adoption (1977, with Howard Altstein)
- Continuity and Change: A Study in Two Ethnic Communities in Israel (1978)
- The Female Defendant in Washington, DC, 1974 and 1975 (1979, with Navin Sharma)
- The American Jury (1980)
- Transracial Adoption: A Followup (1981)
- Public Opinion and the Immigrant: Print Media Coverage, 1880-1980 (1985)
- Transracial Adoptees and Their Families: A Study of Identity and Commitment (1987, with Howard Altstein)
- The Insanity Defense: A Critical Assessment of Law and Policy in the Post-Hinckley Era (1988, with David E. Aaronson)
- Prison Conditions in Israel (1990)
- The Crimes Women Commit, the Punishments They Receive (1991, with Jean Landis)
- Women's Movements in America: Their Successes, Disappointments, and Aspirations (1991, with Gloria Danziger)
- Adoption, Race, and Identity: From Infancy through Adolescence (1992, with Howard Altstein)
- Rabbis, Lawyers, Immigrants, Thieves: Exploring Women's Roles (1993)
- The Ambivalent Welcome: Print Media, Public Opinion, and Immigration (1993, with Susan H. Alexander)
- The Case for Transracial Adoption (1994, with Howard Altstein and Marygold S. Melli)
- In the Golden Land: A Century of Russian and Soviet Jewish Immigration in America (1997)
- Abortion: Statutes, Policies, and Public Attitudes the World Over (1998)
- The Use of Social Science Data in Supreme Court Decisions (1998, with Rosemary J. Erickson)
- Euthanasia and the Right to Die: A Comparative View (1999, with Jennifer M. Scherer)
- Adoption across Borders: Serving the Children in Transracial and Intercountry Adoptions (2000, with Howard Altstein)
- In Their Own Voices: Transracial Adoptees Tell Their Stories (2000, with Rhonda M. Roorda)
- Renaissance Women in Science (2000, with Louise Q. van der Does)

=== Edited books ===
- As We Saw the Thirties (1967)
- Readings in the Sociology of Law (1968)
- The Jury System (1975)
- Research in Law and Sociology (1978)
- The Criminology of Deviant Women (1979, with Freda Adler)
- Research in Law, Deviance and Social Control (1981, with Steven Spitzer)
- New Lives: The Adjustment of Soviet Jewish Immigrants in the United States and Israel (1985)
- International Migration: The Female Experience (1986, with Caroline Brettell)
- Intercountry Adoption: A Multinational Perspective (1991, with Howard Altstein)
- Editors as Gatekeepers: Getting Published in the Social Sciences (1994, with James Fyfe)
- Neither Victim nor Enemy: Women's Freedom Network Looks at Gender in America (1995)
- From Data to Public Policy: Affirmative Action, Sexual Harassment [sic], Domestic Violence, and Social Welfare (1996)
- A Look Backward and Forward at American Professional Women and Their Families (2000)
- Immigrant Women (2000)
- A Comparative Perspective on Major Social Problems (2001)
- Women in the Military (2001)
