= Nicole Hahn Rafter =

American criminologist

Academic background
- Education: Swarthmore College; Harvard University; State University of New York

Academic work
- Discipline: criminology
- Sub-discipline: feminist criminology
- Institutions: Northeastern University

Nicole Hahn Rafter (1939–2016) was a feminist criminology professor at Northeastern University. She received her Bachelor of Arts degree from Swarthmore College in Pennsylvania, achieved her Master of Arts in Teaching from Harvard University, and obtained a Ph.D. in Criminal Justice from State University of New York in Albany. She began her career as a high school and college English professor and switched to criminal justice in her mid-thirties.

In 1977, Rafter began teaching at Northeastern University's College of Criminal Justice in Boston, Massachusetts. There she developed one of the country's first courses on women and crime as well as a course on crime films. In 1999, she resigned her position as a full-time professor to focus on her writing projects. She continued affiliation with Northeastern University as an adjunct professor overseeing dissertation students, but not teaching regular courses. In 2002 she resumed teaching at the College of Criminal Justice with a graduate course in Biological Theories of Crime.

During the 1980s, Rafter began publishing her writings mainly focusing on the female prison system. She argued there have always been differences between the prison systems of the different sexes. She also asserted that academia has focused little on women since the majority of studies were done on male institutions by male writers. She wrote about the history of prisons for women, noting the differences between them and commenting on the effects that gender has on institutions.

In 1988, Rafter published White Trash: the Eugenic Family Studies 1877-1919, writing about the eugenic movement in the United States and the way in which the poor were shaped as inferior through heredity. At the beginning of the 1990s, Rafter accounted for gender in the eugenic movement in the United States, showing how women were negatively affected with biological notions of being carriers of disease through reproduction.

== Intellectual history ==
Rafter achieved a Ph.D. in Criminal Justice from State University of New York, Albany, which sparked her academic career in feminist criminology. Thereafter, she began writing about delinquent individuals. Her first publication on this topic was in 1969, with her first group of writings was released throughout the 1980s.

Rafter began researching and creating arguments for the feminist cause after her book White Trash: the Eugenic Family Studies 1877-1919. This led to her 1997 course at Northeastern University entitled Gender, Representation, and Social Control. This served to teach criminology students knowledge of the workings of prison institutions and their reciprocal influences.

In the 2000s she began focusing on the representation of crime films in mass media and culture. She explored this in her 2006 paper Shots in the Mirror: Crime Films and Society. At the same time, she began research into the biological theories of crime. In 2004 she wrote Earnest A. Hooton and the Biological Tradition in American Criminology, examining the historical importance of Earnest Hooton’s theories of biological explanations of crime while crediting Hooton with building a history for criminology. She also wrote an introduction for Cesare Lombroso’s Criminal Women in 2004.

In the first decade of the 21st century, Rafter published three works relating to crime films and criminology. These works include Badfellas: Movie Psychos, Popular Culture, and Law, Shots in the Mirror: Crime Films and Society, and Crime, Film, and Criminology: Recent Sex Crime Movies. In 2008 she published The Criminal Brain: Understanding Biological Theories of Crime.

== Contributions to feminist criminology ==
Rafter contributed extensively to feminist criminology through her historical research of female prison systems, crime films and their social understandings of sex and crime being their reason for gendering. Her work has influenced the ways in which biological crime theorists have studied women. Her work of gender and justice has evolved with feminist criminological thinking.

Rafter contributed to feminist criminology through her research and literature on the female prison system starting in 1975. She wrote her last contribution in 1999. Arguing that research and writing at the time only focused on men and was written by men, Rafter led the way in documenting historical gender relations in prisons using, for example, the New York State Prison for Women at Auburn. Another early article Rafter published in 1985 which has been cited six times claims that women in state prisons from 1800-1935 were only given partial justice documenting the differences and the emphasis given to male prison systems. Rafter’s work on female prison systems occurred during the time when feminism was becoming a focal point in critical criminology.

Rafter’s contributions to feminist criminology at Northeastern University in particular included her creating the syllabus for one of the first courses on women and crime and crime films. Rafter’s Shots in the Mirror: Crime Films and Society has been cited a total of twenty-one times which is indicative of her influence. Rafter's syllabus elaborates on how our depiction of on-screen crime in movies actually forms our understanding of everyday crime within society. She argues within this book that crime films produce social hierarchies within crime that are reproduced in everyday life. Depicting, for example, the sexualized female character and the villainous man.

== Recognition ==
Northeastern University recognizes one of Rafter’s areas of expertise as biological theories of crime. Her historical account of eugenic family studies published in 1988 and, more recently, her book on the biological theories and writings of Earnest A. Hooton, have both been cited five times. Allegedly, Rafter’s most influential contribution to feminist criminology was her re-translation and resource guide to Cesare Lombroso’s La Donna Delinquente in which she reinterprets women as being inferior and argues, therefore, their committing crimes at a lower level than male offenders. Rafter has shown a large interest in the history of biological theories of crime and her translation of Criminal Woman persuades advances in further research of the history of criminology specifically surrounding crime and women.

== Honors and awards ==
- 2009–2010 Fulbright Fellow Austria
- 2009 Edwin H. Sutherland award from the American Society of Criminology
- 2009 Allen Austin Bartolemew award for Best Paper for Criminology's Darkest Hour: Biocriminology in Nazi Germany
- 1999 Distinguished Scholar Award, Division on Women and Crime, American Society of Criminology
- 1999 American Association on Intellectual and Developmental Disabilities, Hervey B. Wilbur Historic Preservation Award
- 1998 Distinguished Alumni Award, State University of New York at Albany (School of Criminal Justice)
