= Joanne Belknap =

American criminologist

- Education: University of Colorado at Boulder; Michigan State University
- Known for: Gender violence
- Awards: 2009 Elizabeth D. Gee Memorial Lectureshop Award from CU Boulder 2008 Best Article Award from the journal Violence Against Women
- Scientific career
- Fields: Criminology
- Institutions: University of Colorado at Boulder
- Thesis: The effects of poverty, income inequality, and unemployment on crime rates (1986)

Joanne Elizabeth Belknap is an American criminologist and Professor of Ethnic Studies at the University of Colorado Boulder.

Belknap was named a Fellow of the American Society of Criminology. She trained at Temple University's Inside-Out Prison Exchange Program. She studies jail-to-community reentry and implementing college courses in prisons. She was awarded the 2009 Elizabeth D. Gee Memorial Lectureship Award, which recognizes efforts to advance women in academia, interdisciplinary scholarly contributions and distinguished teaching.

She was formerly the chair of the sociology department there from 2013 until she stepped down in 2014. She was the president of the American Society of Criminology from 2013 to 2014.

Professional and academic associations
Preceded by Robert Agnew	President of the American Society of Criminology; 2013	Succeeded by Candace Kruttschnitt
