= Robert Agnew (criminologist) =

American academic

- Born: December 1, 1953 (age 72); Atlantic City, New Jersey, United States
- Education: Rutgers University; University of North Carolina at Chapel Hill
- Known for: General strain theory
- Scientific career
- Fields: Criminology, juvenile delinquency, social psychology
- Workplaces: Emory University

Robert Agnew (born December 1, 1953, in Atlantic City, New Jersey) is the Samuel Candler Dobbs Professor of Sociology at Emory University and past president of the American Society of Criminology.

== Education ==
Agnew received his B.A. with highest honors and highest distinction from Rutgers University in 1975, and his M.A. and Ph.D. from the University of North Carolina at Chapel Hill in, respectively, 1978 and 1980—all in sociology. He joined Emory University in 1980 and served as chairperson of the sociology department from 2006-2009.

Professor Agnew's primary research and teaching interests are criminology and juvenile delinquency, especially criminological theory. He is well known for his development of general strain theory and was elected Fellow of the American Society of Criminology. He has served on the editorial boards of Criminology, Journal of Crime and Justice, Journal of Research in Crime and Delinquency, Journal of Theoretical and Philosophical Criminology, Justice Quarterly, Social Forces, Theoretical Criminology, Turkish Journal of Criminology, and Youth & Society.

In 2015, Dr. Agnew was awarded the Edwin H. Sutherland Award for his pioneering general strain theory which explains causes behind the crime.

== Selected publications ==
=== Books ===
- The Future of Anomie Theory. Boston: Northeastern University Press (1997) (edited with Nikos Passas)
- Criminological Theory: Past to Present. 3d edition. New York: Oxford University Press (2006) (1st edition 1999) (edited with Francis T. Cullen)
- Juvenile Delinquency: Causes and Control. 3d edition. New York: Oxford University Press (2009) (1st edition 2001)
- Why Do Criminals Offend? A General Theory of Crime and Delinquency. New York: Oxford University Press (2005)
- Pressured Into Crime: An Overview of General Strain Theory. New York: Oxford University Press (2006)
- Anomie, Strain and Subcultural Theories of Crime. Burlington, VT: Ashgate (2010) (edited with Joanne Kaufman)
- Toward a Unified Criminology: Integrating Assumptions about Crime, People and Society. New York: NYU Press (2011)

=== Book chapters ===
- "The contribution of social-psychological strain theory to the explanation of crime and delinquency." Advances in Criminological Theory: The Legacy of Anomie Theory, Volume 6, edited by Freda Adler and William Laufer. New Brunswick, NJ: Transaction (1995)
- "Stability and change in crime over the life course: A strain theory explanation." Advances in Criminological Theory: Developmental Theories of Crime and Delinquency, Volume 7, edited by Terence P. Thornberry. New Brunswick, NJ: Transaction (1997)
- "A General Strain Theory approach to violence." Violence: From Theory to Research, edited by Margaret A. Zahn, Henry Brownstein, and Shelly L. Jackson. LexisNexis/Anderson Publishing (2005)
- "General Strain Theory: Recent developments and directions for further research." Advances in Criminological Theory: Taking Stock: The Status of Criminological Theory, Volume 15, edited by Francis T. Cullen, John Wright, and Michelle Coleman. New Brunswick, NJ: Transaction (2006)
- "Revitalizing Merton: General Strain Theory." Advances in Criminological Theory: The Origins of American Criminology, Volume 16, edited by Francis T. Cullen, Freda Adler, Cherl Lero Johnson, and Andrew J. Meyer. New Brunswick, NJ: Transaction (2009)
- "Controlling crime: Recommendations from General Strain Theory." Criminology and Public Policy, edited by Hugh B. Barlow and Scott H. Decker. Philadelphia, PA: Temple University Press (2009)

=== Articles ===
- "A revised strain theory of delinquency." Social Forces 64:151-167 (1985)
- "A longitudinal test of the revised strain theory." Journal of Quantitative Criminology 5:373-387 (1989)
- "Foundation for a general strain theory of delinquency." Criminology 30:47-87 (1992)
- "An empirical test of general strain theory." Criminology 30:475-499 (1992) (with Helene Raskin White)
- "A general strain theory of community differences in crime rates." Journal of Research in Crime and Delinquency 36:123-155 (1999)
- "Building on the foundation of general strain theory: Specifying the types of strain most likely to lead to crime and delinquency." Journal of Research in Crime and Delinquency 38(4):319-352 (2001)

=== Technical Reports ===
- The Development of a Risk Assessment Instrument for the DeKalb County Juvenile Court (1992)
- A Risk Assessment Instrument for the Fulton County Juvenile Court (1993)

Professional and academic associations
Preceded by Robert J. Sampson	President of the American Society of Criminology; 2013	Succeeded by Joanne Belknap
