= Malcolm W. Klein =

American criminologist

Malcolm Ward Klein (September 4, 1930 – August 1, 2023) was an American criminologist, researcher, theorist, retired professor of Sociology at the University of Southern California, and the author of his book The American Street Gang. In addition, he continued to publish eighteen other books and more than fifty articles that are based on his research on gangs.

Throughout the forty years of his research in gangs, he primarily focused on its structures, processes, and their intervention strategies. He was the founder of the Social Science Research Institute at the University of Southern California in 1972 and furthered his agenda in research of gangs. He also began developing gang prevention and intervention strategies, which are promoted by the Law Enforcement Assistance Administration (Department of Justice) and the Youth Development and Delinquency Prevention Administration (Department of Health Education and Welfare). But he took his research further than the city of Los Angeles. He introduced cross-national research, stretching all the way to Europe. He began this process his extension of comparative criminology by organizing the North Atlantic Treaty Organization Advanced Research Workshop and later the first Eurogang Workshop in Schmitten, Germany.

Klein is best known for his research and understanding of how gangs function and its prevention. In his research, he looked at gangs in another point of view that past theorists and researchers did not look at before. He created the connections between different variables of gangs, thus allowing other researchers to look further into the issue of delinquency of gangs. Furthermore, he contributed to comparative criminology by bringing his research into a global perspective. His contributions allowed him to be honored with the August Vollmer Award not only for his research, but also for his "justice or to the treatment or prevention of criminal or delinquent behavior."

== Biography ==
Klein was a Professor Emeritus of Sociology at the University of Southern California. He was born on September 4, 1930. He took part in the faculty at the Sociology Department of the University of Southern California from 1962 to 1998. From 1971 to 1984, he took the position as the Chairman of the University of Southern California Sociology Department.

Klein died in Los Angeles on August 1, 2023, at the age of 92.

== Research and personal views ==
Klein was most notable for his many years of research on gangs. He defines it as "any durable, street-oriented youth group whose involvement in illegal activity is part of its group identity."

One of the main things that Klein emphasizes throughout his years of research is how our law enforcement strategies against street gangs are not working. In an audio interview on the show Which Way, L.A.?, Klein and the host, Warren Olney, talk about two major gang-related arrests that occurred in 2007 (the arrest of Steve Garcia and the arrest of Mario Corona, who is a former gang member with a master's degree in social research from the University of Southern California). Furthermore, they debate the controversy of releasing a top ten most wanted gang member list. Throughout Klein's career, he emphasizes the problem with giving too much attention to gangs. He concluded that the major goal of a street gang is to obtain reputation all across their territory and recognition for their delinquencies. In the audio specifically, he disagreed with the approach of law enforcement to gang activity through arrests and release of a "list" because it would not slow down gang activity, but instead would help them instead.

Throughout his years of research, he arrived at the conclusion that the more attention society provides to gangs, the more active and upward rising gang activity becomes. His evaluation on The Group Guidance Project can illustrate his point. The Group Guidance Project was a program that began back in the 1940s by the Los Angeles Probation Department with a goal of reuniting gang members to their community through different group activities such as weekly club meetings, sports activities, tutoring, individual counseling, and advocacy with community agencies and organizations. However, Klein claims that "increased group programming leads to increased cohesiveness (in both gang growth and gang 'tightness'), and increased cohesiveness leads to increased gang crime." Klein believes that cohesion is one (if not the biggest) part of a street gang and with programs like these, it only serves to increase cohesion between gangs by giving them a more organized methods towards their activities.

Klein's research also expanded to an international level, where he instituted "comparative criminology." In "comparative criminology," Klein examines many differences and similarities on how different cultures affect different gangs in different regions of the world, their behavioral regulations, structures and organizations of gangs, and also delinquencies and crimes of those areas. One big project that he embarked on for this global research on gangs was the Eurogang Project in 1998, where he went to Schmitten, Germany for a conference among American and European researchers to discuss the different aspects of criminology that pertain to their own regions.

In one of his gang control options, he demonstrates it in a table.

| | Targeting | Group Process | Gang Structures | Community Context |
|---|---|---|---|---|
| Prevention | | | | |
| Intervention | | | | |
| Suppression | | | | |

On the left hand side, there are prevention, intervention, and suppression. These are strategies for gang control policies. "Prevention" refers to stop people from being in a gang beforehand. "Intervention" refers to come in between the people who are already in gangs and attempting to disengage them from the group or reduce their association with the gang. "Suppression" refers to stopping the illicit activities of gangs. This concept usually points to law enforcement, arrests, police, courts, correction facilities, and many others. On the top are issues that are present in gang control policies and what it looks like in an ideal policy. "Targeting" is the correct identification of people who are in gangs, whether they are preparing to join or already joining. This principle heavily relies on a person's knowledge of what a gang really is, its structure, organization, activities, effects throughout the years, history, and much more. "Group Process" refers to the idea that "gangs are groups." Klein believes that policy makers must remember that membership of gangs is solidified through opposition from enforcement and society. Once membership solidifies, it prompts others to join and bring the gang group closer. "Gang Structures" refers to the organizations of gangs and the knowledge of how each gang functions, what type of gang they fit into, and their characteristics. Finally, "Community Context" refers to the environment where the gangs take place. Klein emphasizes this concept because the community itself describes how gangs behave and their foundation of the gang. Not all these boxes would be filled, but the table can tie together different issues of dealing with street gangs and assess which aspects a policy needs to utilize to make an effective gang control policy and scheme.

== Publications ==
=== The American Street Gang (1992) ===
In Klein's publication of The American Street Gang, he provides us with the basic definition of street gangs, their evolution throughout the past years, their drug involvement, and reasons to why society has not stopped their actions yet. Klein describes these gangs as an organization of loose bodies tied with multiple and more casual leaderships as compared to our modern day society (with their tightly knit organization and formal leaderships). Klein also makes a clear distinction between the common street gang and drug gangs. On one hand, a drug gang produces strict discipline on its members, who are treated as if they were employees of a company. On the other hand, a street gang is structured in terms of "loyalty" and "similar rivalries," thus producing a less strict discipline on its members. Furthermore, Klein includes a variety of statistics, anecdotes, and personal experience to demonstrate that gang activity across America is on the rise, especially with gang homicides and the general spread of the gangs themselves. Another point that Klein explains is that the liberal method towards the solution of gang activity is not working and instead, is increasing "group cohesion." He believes that the more attention that society gives to gangs, the closer the gang will be, and the greater gang activity will become. From his own personal experience, he tells readers that the programs that will gradually break down the "group cohesion" will take lots of effort to do so.

=== Responding to Troubled Youth (1997) ===
Klein and Cheryl Maxson provides their insights (in a more philosophical approach) towards the "troubled" youth population. The three basic social and philosophical principles that they utilize to discuss the troubled youths are "treatment, deterrence, and normalization rationales." Treatment is the adjustment of emotional problems that are present in the behaviors of status offenses of the troubled youth. Deterrence is the act of control and punishment towards status offenses to prevent further delinquencies. Normalization rationales is the recognition that status offenses are normal behaviors present in the youth population. They examine these three principles in status offenders at seven different cities and their activities in the cities' youth service agencies based on their data from surveys and experiments. Additionally, the authors analyze the legislative aspect of status offenses, particularly in state laws, policies, approaches, and ideologies that are implanted in the legislation that deals with status offenses. Towards the end of the book, Klein and Maxson head into youth runaways by describing the patterns in characteristics, family histories, living conditions, and causes of runaway youths and also different services that are available to runaway youths.

=== Street Gang Patterns and Policies (2006) ===
Malcolm Klein and Cheryl Maxson examine the different patterns in characteristics of street gangs (specifically in America) and review many major gang-control programs seen around the world. In particular, he focuses on the distribution and expansion of gangs, patterns of gang crime, and how gangs are structured and organized. Going into a more individualized level, Klein and Maxson analyze risk factors and reasons why people want to join gangs (especially in the youth population) in five different realms: individual, family, peer, school, and neighborhood. He also brings in community influences to further understand how gang develops and functions inside those communities. Lastly, Klein and Maxson provide their insights on gang prevention and intervention programs in the United States. They claim that current existing gang control methods are not only ineffective, but also are confronting the wrong parts of a gang. To deal with this, they provide a list of guidelines and goals that gang prevention and intervention programs are recommended to follow in order to control gangs more successfully.

=== Gang Cop (2004) ===
Klein describes the experiences of a fictional police officer who specializes in gangs named Paco Domingo based on his own observations and research throughout his time in gang activity research. By using Paco Domingo as a character, the author explains the inner structures and organization of gangs and the dangerous effects of when police officers use violent and corrupt measures to deal with gangs. Additionally, Klein talks about one of the most important part of the journey of a gang cop, their training. Overall, this book highlights the main points that are useful for those interested in the spread of gangs in America, such as criminologists, lawyers, law enforcement, police officers, and much more.

=== Other publications ===
- Chasing After Street Gangs (1971)
- The Street Gangs of Euroburg: A Story of Research (2009)

== Activities ==
=== Eurogang Project (1998) ===
The European Research Group, led by Klein himself, was a conference that took place in Schmitten, Germany in 1998.(2) During this three-day time period, he attempted to produce comparative gang criminology into a global context by starting with Europe. Klein brought many different questions to hand, such as whether or not gangs exist in Europe, what the patterns and methods of gangs are, and much more. From thereafter, many European and American researchers in the conference (with Klein being the lead author) edited and published the first volume of The Eurogang Paradox (2001), explaining the denials held by European criminology researchers that street gangs were nonexistent in Europe because of the big difference between the definition and patterns of an "American" gang versus a "European" gang in their prospective regions.

=== The Ladino Hills Project (1967) ===
The Ladino Hills Project was a project designed by Klein in 1967 in Eastern Los Angeles to combat "group interventions." He began by implementing interventions that based more on the individual rather than the gang as a group. During this time, he included job training, tutoring, recreation in established agencies, and individual therapy in his interventions. From his evaluation, he found that while the sizes of gangs were reduced, the overall rate of delinquency as a gang decreased as well. Specifically, while gang cohesiveness dropped by 40 percent, the number of gang member arrests reduced by 35%. From the project, he states, "we had affected the [gang members] but not their community. The lesson is both obvious and important. Gangs are byproducts of their communities: They cannot long be controlled by attacks on symptoms alone; community structure and capacity must also be targeted."

=== Organizations ===
- Founder of the Social Science Research Institute at the University of Southern California
- Member of the American Society of Criminology (Vice President from 1992 to 1993)
- Member of the American Psychological Association and Society
- Program Chair and Board of Directors (1981–1984) of editorial board of Criminology

== Awards ==
=== August Vollmer Award ===
This award is named after the first police chief in Berkeley, California, who played a role in creating a scientific approach to the vigilante and police field. Not only is the recipient tested for their quality of their research, but also their contribution to "justice or to the treatment or prevention of criminal or delinquent behavior." Malcolm Klein was a member of the American Society of Criminology and they led the giving of the August Vollmer Award. So in 2008, Malcolm Klein became a recipient of this award for his research in gang activity and criminal delinquency based on street gangs.

=== Other awards ===
- American Society of Criminology's Edwin H. Sutherland Award (1990)
- Paul Tappan Award from the Western Society of Criminology (1995)
- Marvin Wolfgang Award for Distinguished Achievements in Criminology (2001)
- Lifetime Achievement Award from University of Southern California (2007)
- USC Associates Award for Creativity in Research and Scholarship
