= General strain theory =

Theory of criminology

General strain theory (GST) is a theory of criminology developed by Robert Agnew. General strain theory has gained a significant amount of academic attention since being developed in 1992. Robert Agnew's general strain theory is considered to be a solid theory, has accumulated a significant amount of empirical evidence, and has also expanded its primary scope by offering explanations of phenomena outside of criminal behavior. This theory is presented as a micro-level theory because it focuses more on a single person at a time rather than looking at the whole of society.

Agnew recognized that strain theory, originally put forward by Robert King Merton, was limited in terms of fully conceptualizing the range of possible sources of strain in society, especially among youth. According to Merton, innovation occurs when society emphasizes socially desirable and approved goals but at the same time provides inadequate opportunity to achieve these goals with the legitimate institutionalized means. In other words, those members of society who find themselves in a position of financial strain yet wish to achieve material success resort to crime in order to achieve socially desirable goals. Agnew supports this assumption but he also believes that, when dealing with youth, there are other factors that incite criminal behaviour. He suggests that negative experiences can lead to stress even when they are not financially induced.

Agnew described four characteristics of strains that are most likely to lead to crime: 1) strains are seen as unjust, 2) strains are seen as high in magnitude, 3) strains are associated with low social control, and 4) strains create some pressure or incentive to engage in criminal coping.

== Agnew's three categories of strain ==
1) Failure to achieve positively valued goals.

2) Removal of positive stimuli.

3) Introduction of negative stimuli.

In an attempt to explain the high rate of male delinquency as compared to female delinquency, Agnew and Broidy analyzed the gender differences between the perception of strain and the responses to strain. The first area that was explored was the amount of strain that people of certain genders experience. According to stress research that Agnew and Broidy complied, women tend to experience as much or more strain than men. Also, women tend to be higher in subjective strain as well. Since women experience more strain and commit less crime, Agnew and Broidy investigated the different types of strain that women and men experience. Their findings are listed below:

Women	Men
Concerned with creating and maintaining close bonds and relationships with others – thus lower rates of property and violent crime	Concerned with material success – thus higher rates of property and violent crime
Face negative treatment, such as discrimination, high demands from family, and restricted behavior	Face more conflict with peers and are likely to be the victims of crime
Failure to achieve goals may lead to self-destructive behavior	Failure to achieve goals may lead to property and violent crime

Source: O Grady

Agnew and Broidy next hypothesized that there may be differences not only in the types of strain, but in the emotional response to strain as well:

Women	Men
More likely to respond with depression and anger	More likely to respond with anger
Anger is accompanied by fear, guilt, and shame	Anger is followed by moral outrage
More likely to blame themselves and worry about the effects of their anger	Quick to blame others and are less concerned about hurting others
Depression and guilt may lead to self-destructive behaviors	Moral outrage may led to property and violent crime

Source: O Grady

Research indicated that women might lack the confidence and the self-esteem that may be conducive to committing crime and employ escape and avoidance methods to relieve the strain. Women may, however, have stronger relational ties that might help to reduce strain. Men are said to be lower in social control, and they socialize in large groups. Women, on the other hand, form close social bonds in small groups. Therefore, men are more likely to respond to strain with crime.

== General Strain Theory of Terrorism ==
In 2010, Robert Agnew published a research paper applying Strain Theory to Terrorism. He finds that terrorism is most likely when people experience 'collective strains' that are:

- high in magnitude, with civilians affected
- unjust
- inflicted by significantly more powerful others, including 'complicit' civilians

== Criticisms and policy recommendations ==
=== Criticisms ===
- The theory is too complex for any everyday person to understand, it is really hard to test because of how complex it is.
- By receiving very mixed results of what has been tested and the theory does not explain the why factor: "Why does a person commit a crime or crimes?"

The criticisms were made because of the research conducted by Agnew in the early 1990s found that these were the main issues the theory had laid out in front of them.

Policy recommendations:

The class of Professor Greenman's Theories of Criminal Behavior found the best way to prevent crimes because of this hypothesized theory is as follows:

- Using different forms of therapy to help people who have anger management problems.
- Teaching people how to respond to strain a person may experience through teaching coping mechanisms that are behavioral, emotional and cognitive driven.
- Another way to reduce the amount of strain a person may experience is prescribing medications to them.
