= Freda Adler =

American academic

Freda Adler (born 21 November 1934) is a criminologist and educator, currently serving as professor emeritus at Rutgers University and a visiting professor at the University of Pennsylvania. She was President of the American Society of Criminology in 1994-1995. She has acted as a consultant to the United Nations on criminal justice matters since 1975, holding various roles within United Nations organizations. A prolific writer, Adler has published in a variety of criminological areas, including female criminality, international issues in crime, piracy, drug abuse, and social control theories.

== Biography ==
Adler received a Bachelor of Arts|B.A.] in sociology, Master of Arts|M.A.] in criminology, and her [Ph.D.)in sociology from the University of Pennsylvania, under the guidance of professor Thorsten Sellin, publishing her Ph.D. dissertation in 1971. Adler received a D.H.L. (honoris causa) from the University of Scranton in 2011. She has been on the Board of Directors of the University of Pennsylvania Association of Alumni, the International Society of Social Defense, the Consortium of Social Science Associations (COSSA), the International Scientific and Professional Advisory Council (ISPAC) of United Nations Programs in Crime Prevention and Criminal Justice, and The Police Foundation (Washington, D.C.) She began her career in criminal justice as an evaluator of drug and alcohol treatment programs for federal and state governments. For several decades she has taught subjects such as criminal justice, criminology, comparative criminal justice systems, statistics, and research methods. Adler serves as an adviser to governments worldwide.

Adler first gained prominence in 1975 by articulating a controversial theory (known generally as the Liberation Theory of Female Criminality) in which she predicted rising crime rates for women as a result of the success of the women’s liberation movement. In other words, according to this theory the feminist social movement had increased women’s opportunities, and thirst, for crime. From a criminological viewpoint, her thesis strongly contradicted the pathological explanations of female criminality prevalent in the preceding century. By the following year, with the publication of her book, Sisters in Crime: The Rise of the New Female Criminal, she was reported as being "billed as the 'foremost female criminologist in the United States'"

Adler's publications include thirteen books as author or co-author, nine edited or co-edited books, and over 100 journal articles. She is the recipient of the Beccaria Medal in Gold of the Deutsche Kriminologische Gesellschaft (representing Germany, Luxembourg and Switzerland), the Chi Omega Sociology Award, the American Society of Criminology International Division Award, the Distinguished Alumna Award of the Department of Criminology, University of Pennsylvania and the Academy of Criminal Justice Sciences Founder's Award. The International Division of the American Society of Criminology presents a Freda Adler Distinguished Scholar Award annually. Adler is a Fellow of The Max-Planck Institute of Foreign and International Law and Criminology, the American Society of Criminology and the Academy of Criminal Justice Sciences. She is a Senior Fellow of the Zicklin Center for Business Ethics Research, The Wharton School, University of Pennsylvania. Adler has occasionally collaborated with her husband, Gerhard O.W. Mueller, who served as chief of the United Nations crime prevention and criminal justice section.

Adler has three children, Mark, Jill, and Nanci. Adler's husband died on April 20, 2006.

== Sources ==
- Biography of Freda Adler, Department of Criminology, University of Pennsylvania
- Melissa Hamilton, Theorist: Freda Adler, at The Florida State University
