= Neo-classical school (criminology) =

In criminology, the Neo-Classical School continues the traditions of the Classical School the framework of Right Realism. Hence, the utilitarianism of Jeremy Bentham and Cesare Beccaria remains a relevant social philosophy in policy term for using punishment as a deterrent through law enforcement, the courts, and imprisonment.

== Discussion ==
When crime and recidivism are perceived to be a problem, the first political reaction is to call for increased policing, stiffer penalties, and increased monitoring and surveillance for those released on parole. Intuitively, politicians see a correlation between the certainty and severity of punishment, and the choice whether to commit crime. The practical intention has always been to deter and, if that failed, to keep society safer for the longest possible period of time by locking the habitual offenders away in prisons (see Wilson). From the earliest theorists, the arguments were based on morality and social utility, and it was not until comparatively recently that there has been empirical research to determine whether punishment is an effective deterrent.

=== Social control theory ===
As represented in the work of Travis Hirschi, the Social Control Theory proposes that exploiting the process of socialisation and Social Learning Theory builds self-control and reduces the inclination to indulge in behavior recognized as antisocial. It is based on Functionalist theories of crime and proposes that there are three types of control:

- Direct: by which punishment is threatened or applied for wrongful behaviour, and compliance is rewarded by parents, family, and authority figures.
- Indirect: by which a youth refrains from delinquency because his or her delinquent act might cause pain and disappointment to parents and others with whom he or she has close relationships.
- Internal: by which a person's conscience or sense of guilt prevents him or her from engaging in delinquent acts.

=== Drift theory ===
Although it was not presented as a Social Control Theory, David Matza (1964) also adopted the concept of emphasised frustration and rebelliousness against normative social values by delinquent youth. Matza did not identify any specific constraints or controls that would keep youth from drifting, but drifters were depicted as youth who have few stakes in conformity and are free to drift into delinquency. As with Hirschi, Matza was skeptical that deviancy could be explained in terms of distinct subcultural or countercultural value systems. Free will. Delinquent youth were neither compelled nor committed to their delinquent actions, but were simply less receptive to other more conventional traditions (1964:28). Thus, delinquent youth were "drifting" between criminal and non-criminal behaviour, and were relatively free to choose whether to take part in delinquency. This challenged the Strain Theory.

=== Rational choice theory ===
Rational choice theory grew out of the expected utility principle in economic theory, i.e. that people will make rational decisions based on their expectations for utility maximization. To that extent, it fits the model of utilitarianism as proposed by the Classical School, but its implications are doubted by the Neoclassical School.

== Modern research ==
Initial studies compared homicide statistics between states using and not using capital punishment, and found no evidence of deterrence (Bailey & Peterson). Studies then tested certainty as against severity of punishment, e.g. Erickson (1977). The research methodologies used are either the analysis of Official Statistics for objective indicators of correlations, and attitudinal interviews and questionnaires for subjective indicators (potential criminals will not be deterred unless they understand how the criminal justice system works). The research finds that the majority conform to the law because they subscribe to the social and moral values represented by the law (i.e. the process of socialisation is effective). Hence, at best, the threat of punishment has a not statistically insignificant effect on reported crime and the empirical evidence in support of deterrence is very limited. Raymond Paternoster's work (see bibliography ) demonstrates that the only statistically significant data emerges from experiential studies among those who have been through the criminal justice system (i.e. specific deterrence), but that this data on its own cannot validate general deterrence. He also finds no evidence that formal social controls are effective. Some informal social negative consequences such as the disapproval of family, loss of reputation, possible loss of employment, etc., are more significant. There is also strong evidence that increasing the rewards of conformity by providing better employment opportunities at realistic rates of pay can achieve comparable deterrent effect by giving potential offenders more to lose (Tierney:1996, 277).
