= Right realism =

School of thought in criminology

Right realism, in criminology, also known as New Right Realism, Neo-Classicism, Neo-Positivism, or Neo-Conservatism, is the ideological polar opposite of left realism. It considers the phenomenon of crime from the perspective of political conservatism and asserts that it takes a more realistic view of the causes of crime and deviance, and identifies the best mechanisms for its control. Compared to other schools of criminology, there is less emphasis on developing theories of causality in relation to crime and deviance (the tendency is to scientifically examine official statistics as evidence). The school employs a rationalist, direct and scientific approach to policy-making for the prevention and control of crime. Some politicians who subscribe to the perspective may address aspects of crime policy in ideological terms by referring to freedom, justice, and responsibility. For example, they might assert that individual freedom should only be limited by a duty not to use force against others. The school has made real contributions made to the nature of criminal behaviour.

== Overview ==
The primary focus is on the control and prevention of criminal behavior, i.e., the criminals have to be prevented from breaking the criminal law and punished if they do. There is little interest in exploring concepts of power and structures in society. Indeed, the political view of the Thatcherite branch of right wing politics is that, "There is no such thing as Society. There are individual men and women and there are families". (Margaret Thatcher 1993:626). This is distinguishable from political systems that provide order for their subjects and the problems to be governed in terms of their relationship to society, whether as functional or dysfunctional, integrated or isolated, organized or disorganized. In the face of theories of autonomy and an increasingly entrepreneurial culture, government increasingly focuses on mobilizing individuals, families, "the market" and voluntary associations such as "communities". Privatization rather than social welfare has become the paradigm, despite there being no empirical evidence to suggest that the former has created any better outcomes, per unit cost, than the latter.

The New Right therefore adopts the language of "realism" to describe the lawmaking process instead of addressing the causes of the "crimes" being created. James Q. Wilson, who was President Ronald Reagan's adviser on crime, for example, rejects the idea that crime has "root causes" that can be found in the structural contexts of people's lives. Given the lack of correlation between unemployment and crime, which could have formed the basis for a structural explanation of crime, the New Right turns to a cultural explanation. They see a decline in "family values" and, in particular, a lack of discipline both inside and outside the home. Further, there is sometimes an apparent rejection of utilitarian theories of deterrence as a basis for eliminating any cause of crime. The only practical outcome said to be achievable is the minimization of the impact that crime might have on ordinary people. Whereas Jeremy Bentham advocated the "use of pain where shame has proved ineffective", Right Realism advocates the principle that nothing deters more than the certainty of detection. Thus, more proactive policing through policies of zero tolerance to make it safe for citizens to be on the streets and in their homes and a greater allocation of resources to detection will have more success than the current reactive stance in relation to crimes committed. In this strand of argument, there is a form of cost-benefit analysis where the success of institutions charged with the task of control is measured by reference to the recorded incidence of crime over time. One Benthamite concept is accepted, namely that man is a calculating animal who will weigh the rewards likely to be earned from crime against the chances of being caught. Indeed, to build greater conformity where deviance is socially unacceptable, the New Right advocates the allocation of resources into the education system to underpin adherence to moral values. This is an informal and internal system of control to match the formal and external controls through lawmaking and enforcement through policing.

=== Social control theory ===
Right Realism has its origins in control theory and, as such, it is related to functionalist theories of crime. It is said that there are three types of control:

1. Direct, by which punishment is threatened or applied for wrongful behavior, and compliance is rewarded by parents, family, and authority figures.
2. Indirect, by which a youth refrains from delinquency because their delinquent act might cause pain and disappointment to parents and others with whom they have close relationships.
3. Internal, by which a person's conscience or sense of guilt prevents them from engaging in delinquent acts.

Social control theory (later also called social bonding theory) proposes that people's relationships, commitments, values, norms, and beliefs encourage them not to break the law. Thus, if moral codes are internalized and individuals are tied into, and have a stake in, their wider community, they will voluntarily limit their propensity to commit deviant acts. The theory seeks to understand the ways in which it is possible to reduce the likelihood of criminality developing in individuals. It does not consider motivational issues, simply stating that human beings may choose to engage in a wide range of activities unless the range is limited by the processes of socialization and social learning. This derives from a Hobbesian view of human nature as represented in Leviathan, i.e., that all choices are constrained by implicit social contracts, agreements and arrangements among people. Thus, morality is created in the construction of social order, assigning costs and consequences to certain choices and defining some as evil, immoral and/or illegal. Although Travis Hirschi was not the first to propose a social control theory, the Causes of Delinquency (1969) was a landmark book, contrasting with the strain theory (see anomie and the work of Robert King Merton) and conflict theory. In particular, Hirschi challenged differential association theory (Edwin Sutherland and Donald Cressey) on the impact of delinquent peers on delinquency. He proposed that delinquent peers would be found to have no direct effect on delinquency when social bonds inhibiting delinquency were taken into account. He argued that similarly unattached youth drifted together into delinquent groups. It was weak social bonds that resulted in both delinquency and association with delinquents.

=== Self-control theory ===
Travis Hirschi has since moved away from his bonding theory and, in co-operation with Michael R. Gottfredson, developed a "General Theory of Crime" or self-control theory in 1990 and onwards. Based on the empirical observation of the strong, consistent connection between criminal behavior and age, Hirschi and Gottfredson theorizes that the single most important factor behind crime is individual lack of self-control. Individual self-control improves with age as a result of many factors: changing biology through hormonal development, socialization and increasing opportunity costs of losing control. In addition, criminal acts are often markedly non-controlled, both opportunistic and short-sighted. Akers (1991) argued that a major weakness of this new theory was that Gottfredson and Hirschi did not define self-control and the tendency toward criminal behavior separately. By not deliberately operationalizing self-control traits and criminal behavior or criminal acts individually, it suggests that the concepts of low self-control and propensity for criminal behavior are one and the same. Hirschi and Gottfredson (1993) rebutted Akers' argument by suggesting it was actually an indication of the consistency of General Theory. That is, the theory is internally consistent by conceptualizing crime and deriving from that a concept of the offender's traits. The research community remains divided on whether the General Theory of Crime is sustainable but there is emerging confirmation of some of its predictions (e.g. LaGrange & Silverman: 1999). A number of empirical studies – including meta-analyses – have confirmed that individual self-control is in fact one of the strongest predictors of crime when compared to a range of factors at various levels of analysis.

=== Containment theory ===
Walter Reckless began developing containment theory by focusing on a youth's self-conception or self-image of being a good person as an insulator against peer pressure to engage in delinquency. This inner containment through self-images is developed within the family and is essentially formed by about the age of twelve. Outer containment was a reflection of strong social relationships with teachers and other sources of conventional socialization within the neighborhood. The basic proposition is there are "pushes" and "pulls" that will produce delinquent behavior unless they are counteracted by containment. If the motivations to deviant acts are strong and containment is weak, then crime is highly likely to follow.

=== Neo-Positivism ===
This is particularly associated with Wilson (1975) and Wilson and Herrnstein (1985) who agree that social transformation will be required if crime rates are to be reduced, but believe that this can be achieved without any significant loss of freedom (which they consider worth preserving even if that means having to tolerate some crime). They attribute the cause of the growth in crime to a general permissiveness in society and a dependency culture among those who survive on welfare benefits. They claim realism in that the state should aim to make modest reductions in street crime, starting with the socialization of children within the family and the education system to develop consciences sufficiently strong to reject the temptation to engage in crime. But this social conditioning on its own will be ineffective. It must be combined with deterrence through improvement in detection and arrest rates, and reform in the attitudes of judges who have been too lenient in sentencing. This is specific deterrence and they argue that punishment works if a connection can be established in the mind of a punished offender between a planned criminal action and memories of the consequence for a previous criminal action. But they reject rehabilitation in the face of the statistics of recidivism. If all else seems to fail, hardened criminals must be locked away for the protection of society. There is also some movement back to biological and psychological explanations for criminality (see Gottfredson and Hirschi: 1987, Wasserman and Wachbroit: 2001, Rowe: 2002). Control Theory addressed social as opposed to legal deterrence, but Neo-Positivism accepts that whichever view may be correct, autonomy is paramount, i.e. the potential offender has a free choice on whether to ignore the feelings of others or the penalties of the state.

=== Situational theory ===
Situational crime prevention has been defined as "the use of measures directed at highly specific forms of crime, which involve the management, design or manipulation of the immediate environment in as systematic and permanent a way as possible" (Clarke & Hough: 1980). It is sometimes referred to as "primary prevention" or "opportunity reduction" and it seems most relevant to offences which cluster in time or space, and are high rate, creating crime "hot spots". This theory seek to develop ways of making crime "more difficult", and of making people more aware of opportunistic crime, say through advertising campaigns, and of how physical environment encourages or deters crime. Situational crime prevention (Clarke: 1995, 1997) has four components:

1. a theoretical foundation drawing upon routine activity and rational decisions.
2. a standard methodology based on the action research paradigm,
3. a set of opportunity-reducing techniques or target hardening, and
4. a body of evaluated practice including studies of displacement. (Clarke, 1997: 6)

It focuses on reducing crime opportunities rather than on the characteristics of criminals or potential criminals. The strategy is to increase the associated risks and difficulties, and reduce the rewards. It asserts that crime is often committed through the accident of a practical or attractive opportunity, e.g. that a car is found unlocked or a window left open and that patterns in criminal activity are not simply based on where criminals live. For crimes aimed at households, initiatives include encouraging people to make their homes more secure – sometimes called 'target hardening' – and marking their property for easier identification. Responsibility rests with the individual householder; the police role is usually restricted to giving free specialist security advice. The most interesting criticism of this theory is that it may breed a fortress society where everyone is locked in his or her homes to prevent crime. At the community level, Neighborhood Watch schemes encourage people to monitor their neighbourhoods and to report suspicious incidents to the police. Environmental design focuses on improving street lighting, controlling access to buildings, restricting pedestrian and traffic flow, and dividing residential spaces into identifiable areas. The most ambitious environmental design schemes have been carried out in the United States where the property of the rich is protected by expensive hardware, alarm systems, and even private guards. The overall challenge is to motivate those most in need of protection against crime to help themselves. This raises the need for a corporate or inter-agency response to crime prevention, rather than devolving all responsibility onto the individual.

This is a practical application of the control theory and answers the question, "Why don't people commit crime?" by "Because of social control and deterrents". This implies that crime and delinquency are a result of choice, and Clarke and Cornish (1985) posit that, "...crime is purposive behavior designed to meet the offender's commonplace needs for such things as money, status, sex, excitement, and that meeting these needs involves the making of (sometimes quite rudimentary) decisions and choices, constrained as they are by limits of time and ability and the availability of relevant information." Thus, offenders make decisions that appear rational (to the offenders at least) to engage in specific criminal acts.

=== Rational choice theory ===
The immediate roots of rational choice theory are routine activity, situational crime prevention, and economic theories of crime (Clarke, 1997:9) This repeats the classical school of Jeremy Bentham and Cesare Beccaria. Neoclassicism in the U.S. differ from rational choice theorists in their emphasis on punishment as a deterrent, imposing punishment systems like the "three strikes law" and placing limits on sentencing discretion as rational, effective deterrents to crime. Apart from the ethical considerations and the high cost of long-term incarceration, Clarke's research demonstrates that certainty of apprehension rather than the severity of punishment is the major deterrent. Critics observe that there is little point in investing resources in situational crime prevention if the thwarted criminal simply moves from one crime to another (termed "crime displacement"). It is difficult to prove the absence of displacement. Central to the displacement criticism is the belief that, to the offender, most crimes are equivalent, i.e. that an offender would just as soon commit one crime as another. This is a positivist assumption that crime is a product of enduring dispositions by the offender. Clarke & Cornish (1987: 45-50) argue that displacement occurs only under certain conditions, namely, all things considered, the criminal may not think that the benefits justify displacement. For example, in 1960 the steering columns of all cars in Germany were equipped with locks and the result was a 60 per cent reduction in car thefts. Whereas, in Great Britain only new cars were so equipped with the result being crime was displaced to the older unequipped cars. However, no evidence exists to suggest that an obscene phone caller will begin a career as a burglar. In response, Akers (1990) says that rational choice theorists make so many exceptions to the pure rationality stressed in their own models that nothing sets them apart from other theorists. Further, the rational choice models in literature have various situational or cognitive constraints and deterministic notions of cause and effect that render them, "...indistinguishable from current 'etiological' or 'positivist' theories."

== Critique ==
Critics put accusations of problems with this school of thought. It's believed that the school under-emphasises the causes of crime, reacting to the phenomenon of crime and seeking to prevent it without a substantial body of empirical evidence as to whether patterns of offending are related to age, gender, race, location, social class, etc., nor provide any research into metrics of success or failure for proactive policing and education as a system for imparting values. It accepts the utilitarian idea that people act rationally without considering why people may choose to break the law. As it stands, Right Realism seems to depend on the inculcation of moral imperatives which are taken as self-evidently the best solution to the problem of crime. Bryson and Mowbray (1981) regard the notion of shared values in the community as a cynical exercise by Conservatism to set insiders (law-abiding, consensual community members) against the outsiders (criminals that harm the community), and thus foster a law-and-order politics (Wilson: 1986). This may ignore the empowerment potential in the community as a voluntary organization of citizens taking responsibility for themselves and their neighbors, mobilized in their own interests, to act in a mutually beneficial fashion. Independent collective action without involving the state and its more heavy-handed compulsions may be more effective than aggressive policing that alienates local opinion according to some critics. The models of situational crime prevention are not simply gesture politics by the "Right" but an area in which progressive criminologists recognize positive developments in rethinking social justice (James 1996).

It has been argued that within Right Realism, there is inadequate interest in corporate crime, white-collar crime, political crime or state crime as it places more interest onto young males and street crime. Van Den Haag (1975) proposes that capitalism is about the creation of "winners" and "losers". Livesey attempts to identify the implication that winners must be allowed to enjoy the fruits of their enterprise and their risk-taking without these rewards being taken away by the losers. If capitalism continues as a form of economic production, those responsible for the creation and accumulation of wealth must be protected from the activities of criminals. This therefore justifies shifting the remit of law enforcement to concentrate surveillance and monitoring on the activities of the "losers" that threatens the "winners".
