= Self-control theory of crime =

Criminological theory concerning lack of self-control

The self-control theory of crime, often referred to as the general theory of crime, is a criminological theory about the lack of individual self-control as the main factor behind criminal behavior. The self-control theory of crime suggests that individuals who were ineffectually parented before the age of ten develop less self-control than individuals of approximately the same age who were raised with better parenting. Research has also found that low levels of self-control are correlated with criminal and impulsive conduct.

The theory was originally developed by criminologists Travis Hirschi and Michael Gottfredson, but has since been subject to a great deal of theoretical debate and a large and growing empirical literature.

== Theory and background ==
Springing from interest in bonding theory, Hirschi—in co-operation with Gottfredson—has developed the "General Theory of Crime" or self-control theory from 1990 onward. Based on the empirical observation of the connection between criminal behavior and age, Hirschi and Gottfredson theorized that an important factor behind crime is individual lack of self-control. Individual self-control improves with age as a result of many factors: changing biology through hormonal development, socialization and increasing opportunity costs of losing control. In addition, criminal acts are often markedly non-controlled; they are both opportunistic and short-sighted. It is essentially the extent to which different people are vulnerable to the temptations of the moment.

== Self-control in psychology ==
Freud (1911, 1959) established a foundation for the concept of self-control with his "pleasure-principle" and "reality-principle". Respectively, these refer to the desire for immediate gratification and the delay of gratification. The pleasure principle drives an individual to look for pleasure and to avoid pain. However, in the process of growing up, the individual learns the necessity of enduring pain and delaying gratification because of the obstacles created by the realities of life. More recent psychological research has retained a notion of self-control as referring to an individual's decision or ability to delay immediate gratification of desires in order to reach larger alternative goals.

== Acute vs. chronic low self-control ==
Contrary to the general theory of crime that presents low self-control as a characteristic of an individual that influences one's behavior, the criminal spin theory presents the reduction of self-control as a phenomenological process. This process can be acute, a one-time only that is not typical to the individual, or it can develop into a chronic state, in which participation in criminal activities becomes central to the individual life. In addition, the criminal spin theory claims that such a process that leads to a state of reduced self-control can be seen in individuals, groups (e.g., group rape) of even larger social entities (e.g., local communities).

== Criticisms and defense ==
Akers (1991) argued that a major weakness of this new theory was that Gottfredson and Hirschi did not define self-control and the tendency toward criminal behavior separately. By not deliberately operationalizing self-control traits and criminal behavior or criminal acts individually, it suggests that the concepts of low self-control and propensity for criminal behavior are one and the same. Hirschi and Gottfredson (1993) replied to Akers' argument by suggesting it was actually an indication of the consistency of the General Theory. That is, the theory is internally consistent by conceptualizing crime and deriving from that a concept of the offender's traits. Another criticism of Gottfredson and Hirshi's self control theory is that it downplays the influences of one's peers.

== Empirical support ==
The research community remains divided on whether the General Theory of Crime is sustainable but there is emerging confirmation of some of its predictions (e.g. LaGrange & Silverman: 1999). A number of empirical studies—including meta-analysis—have confirmed that individual self-control is in fact a strong predictors of crime, when compared to a range of factors at various levels of analysis.

== See also ==
- Control theory (sociology)
- Right realism
- Social control theory
- Reality Principle
- Pleasure Principle
