= Deviant behavior =

Deviant behavior may refer to

- Abnormality (behavior), behaviors that are regarded as dysfunctional
- Deviance (sociology), actions or behaviors that violate social norms
- Deviant Behavior (journal), an interdisciplinary journal which focuses on social deviance
- Deviant Behavior (book), a textbook by American sociologist Erich Goode
