= Techniques of neutralization =

Psychological theory

Techniques of neutralization are a theoretical series of methods by which those who commit illegitimate acts temporarily neutralize certain values within themselves which would normally prohibit them from carrying out such acts, such as morality, obligation to abide by the law, and so on. In simpler terms, it is a psychological method for people to turn off "inner protests" when they do, or are about to do something they themselves perceive as wrong.

== The theory ==
Neutralization techniques were first proposed by David Matza and Gresham Sykes in their work on Edwin Sutherland's differential association in the 1950s. While Matza and Sykes were at the time working on juvenile delinquency, their hypothesis was that the same techniques could be found throughout society. They published their ideas in Delinquency and Drift.

Matza and Sykes' hypothesis states that people are always aware of their moral obligation to abide by the law, and that they have the same moral obligation within themselves to avoid illegitimate acts. Thus, they reasoned, when a person did commit illegitimate acts, they must employ some sort of mechanism to silence the urge to follow these moral obligations.

This hypothesis rejects other theories which suggested that groups containing delinquents have set up their own permanent moral code which completely replaces moral obligations. Thus, Matza and Sykes were able to explain how offenders 'drift' from illegitimate to legitimate lifestyles repeatedly, as they retain the moral code rather than wipe it clean to be replaced by a more illegitimate one as previous theories suggested.

== The techniques ==
The theory was prompted by four observations:

- Delinquents often express guilt over their illegal acts.
- Delinquents often respect and admire honest, law-abiding individuals.
- Delinquents often distinguish people they may victimize from people they must not.
- Delinquents are not immune to the demands of conformity.

These observations draw on positivist criminology, which conducted empirical research into delinquency.

From these, Matza and Sykes created the following methods by which, they believed, delinquents justified their illegitimate actions:

1. Denial of responsibility. The offender insists that they were victims of circumstance, forced into a situation beyond their control.
2. Denial of injury. The offender insists that their actions did not cause any harm or damage.
3. Denial of the victim. The offender insists that the victim deserved it.
4. Condemnation of the condemners. The offender maintains that those who condemn the offence do so out of spite, or are unfairly shifting the blame off themselves.
5. Appeal to higher loyalties. The offender claims the offence is justified by a higher law or higher loyalty such as friendship.

These five methods of neutralization generally manifest themselves in the form of arguments, such as:

- "It wasn't my fault"
- "It wasn't a big deal. They could afford the loss"
- "They had it coming"
- "You were just as bad in your day"
- "My friends needed me. What was I going to do?"

In 2017, Bryant et al. analysed statements made by 27 individuals accused of participation in the Rwanda genocide and found two neutralization techniques that had not been identified before:

- Appeal to good character. The offender will "assert their good deeds or admirable character attributes that they contend render them incapable of committing (genocidal) crimes".
- Victimisation. The offender will argue how they, or people close to them or their ethnic group, were under threat or have suffered loss by a third party (e.g., in the case of the Rwandan genocide, the Tutsi).

Kaptein and van Helvoort propose an ‘amoralization alarm clock’ to explain all such amoralizations or neutralizations.

== Acceptance ==
Further research in the hypothesis has produced inconclusive results. Offenders have been found both with a solid belief in their moral obligations, and without. Travis Hirschi, a social bond theorist, also raised the question as to whether the offender develops these techniques to neutralise their qualms regarding offending before or after they actually commit the offence.

The Neutralization Hypothesis was introduced by Sykes and Matza in 1957, facing the then prevailing criminological wisdom that offenders engage in crime because they adhere to an oppositional subcultural rule set that values law breaking and violence, they rejected this perspective. Subsequent research revealed that the original formulation of Sykes and Matza's theory explains only the behavior of "conventionally attached individuals" not those of "nonconventionally oriented individuals" such as "criminally embedded street offenders". Professor Volkan Topalli, at Georgia State University, in his article The Seductive Nature of Autotelic Crime: How Neutralization Theory Serves as a Boundary Condition for Understanding Hardcore Street Offending, explains that for those groups "guilt is not an issue at all because their crimes are not only considered acceptable, but attractive and desirable".

== See also ==
Amoralizations

- Deviance (sociology)
- Criminology
- Ethnomethodology
- Rationalization (psychology)
- Social order
- Social control
- Tu quoque
- Victim blaming
