= Albert J. Reiss =

American sociologist and criminologist (1922–2006)

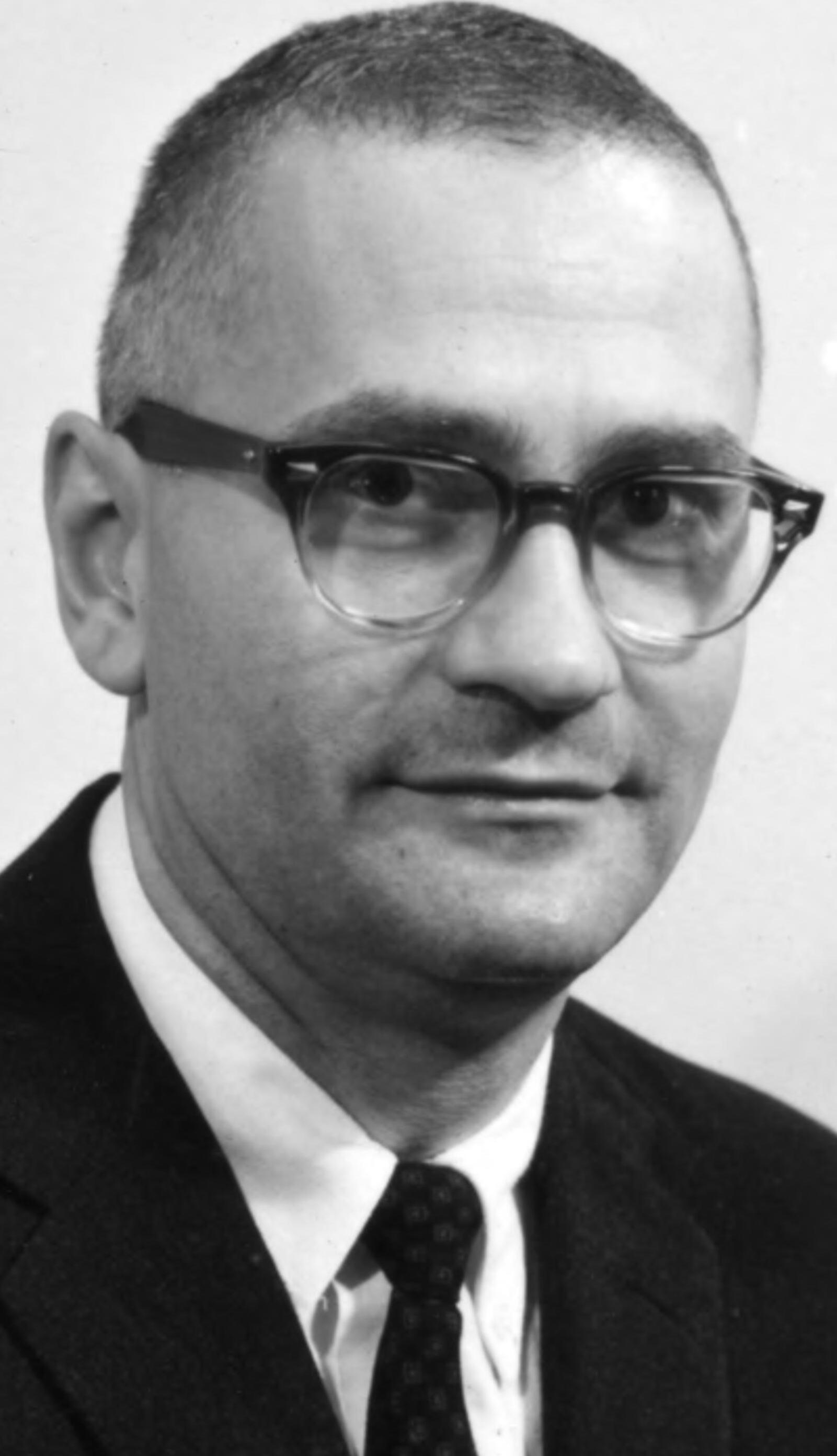
- Born: Albert John Reiss; December 9, 1922; Cascade, Wisconsin
- Died: April 27, 2006 (aged 83); Hamden, Connecticut
- Education: Marquette University; University of Chicago
- Known for: Social control theory
- Spouse: Emma Hutto Reiss
- Children: 3
- Scientific career
- Fields: Criminology
- Institutions: University of Iowa; University of Michigan; University of Wisconsin; Vanderbilt University; Yale University
- Thesis: The Accuracy, Efficiency, and Validity of a Prediction Instrument (1949)
- Doctoral students: Bernice A. Pescosolido; Lawrence W. Sherman

Albert John Reiss Jr. (December 9, 1922 – April 27, 2006) was an American sociologist and criminologist.

== Career ==
He served as the William Graham Sumner Professor of Sociology at Yale University from 1970 until his retirement in 1993. He is recognized for his contributions to social control theory, as well as for his research on police violence. He has been credited with coining the term "proactive" while researching violent incidents between police and private citizens as a research director for Lyndon B. Johnson's President's Commission on Law Enforcement and Administration of Justice. This research led Reiss to conclude that there was a greater risk of violence in reactive police encounters than in proactive ones, prompting innovation in policing practices in many American police departments.

Reiss served as president of the Society for the Study of Social Problems in 1968–69. In 1983, he was elected to the American Academy of Arts and Sciences. He was also a Fellow of the American Statistical Association. He was elected president of the American Society of Criminology in 1984, and of the International Society of Criminology in 1990, making him the first person to serve as president of both organizations. In 1996, the American Sociological Association named its Award for Distinguished Scholarship in Crime, Law and Deviance after him.

Professional and academic associations
Preceded by Travis Hirschi	President of the American Society of Criminology; 1984	Succeeded by Austin Turk
