= John Goldkamp =

American criminologist

John S. Goldkamp
- Born: December 20, 1947; Orange, New Jersey, US
- Died: August 26, 2012 (aged 64); Philadelphia, Pennsylvania, US
- Education: Wesleyan University; University at Albany
- Known for: Work on drug courts
- Spouses: Mona Margarita; Rely Vilcica (until his death)
- Awards: 2012 August Vollmer Award from the American Society of Criminology
- Scientific career
- Fields: Criminal justice
- Institutions: Temple University
- Thesis: Bail decision-making and the role of pre-trial detention in American criminal justice (1977)

John S. Goldkamp (December 20, 1947 in Orange, New Jersey – August 26, 2012 in Philadelphia, Pennsylvania) was an American criminologist who was a professor at Temple University for over 25 years. From 1979 to 1983, and again from 2004 to 2010, he was the chair of the department of criminal justice at Temple.

== Early life and education ==
Goldkamp was born in Orange, New Jersey on December 20, 1947. He graduated from Wesleyan University in 1969 with a bachelor's degree in French literature, after which he began graduate work at the University at Albany. He received his master's and doctoral degrees from the University at Albany in 1975 and 1977, respectively, where he was influenced by such scholars as Michael Hindelang and Michael Gottfredson.

== Work ==
Goldkamp was known for studying drug courts in the United States. In particular, a study of a Florida drug court he published in the early 1990s is credited with encouraging many other parts of the United States to adopt such courts. He is also known for developing the first bail guidelines in the United States, which he produced in 1986 for the city of Philadelphia.

== Death ==
Goldkamp died on August 26, 2012, of multiple myeloma, at the University of Pennsylvania's hospital in Philadelphia. He was 64 years old.
