= Lauren Krivo =

American sociologist

- Born: Lauren Joy Krivo
- Education: Washington University in St. Louis; University of Texas at Austin
- Known for: Work on race and crime in the United States
- Awards: 2012 Lifetime Achievement Award from the Division on People of Color and Crime of the American Society of Criminology
- Scientific career
- Fields: Sociology; Criminology
- Workplaces: Rutgers University
- Thesis: Regional Economic Redistribution and Female and Male Unemployment (1984)

Lauren J. Krivo is an American sociologist who is professor of sociology at Rutgers University, where she is also an affiliated professor in the Program in Criminal Justice. She is also the director of graduate studies in Rutgers' sociology department. She is known for her work on residential segregation and disadvantage as they relate to race and crime in the United States. She co-founded the Racial Democracy, Crime, and Justice Network, a national network of scholars dedicated to researching race, crime, and justice, along with her longtime collaborator Ruth D. Peterson.

== Books ==
=== Co-authored ===
- Divergent Social Worlds (with Ruth D. Peterson) (Russell Sage, 2010)

=== Co-edited ===
- The Many Colors of Crime: Inequalities of Race, Ethnicity, and Crime in America (with Ruth D. Peterson and John L. Hagan) (NYU Press, 2006)
- Race, Crime, and Justice: Contexts and Complexities (with Ruth D. Peterson) (May 2009 volume of the Annals of the American Academy of Political and Social Science)
