= Goldkamp =

Goldkamp is a surname. Notable people with the surname include:

- John Goldkamp (1947–2012), American criminologist
- Marion Hellmann (née Goldkamp; born 1967), former German high jumper
