= Self-control =

Aspect of inhibitory control

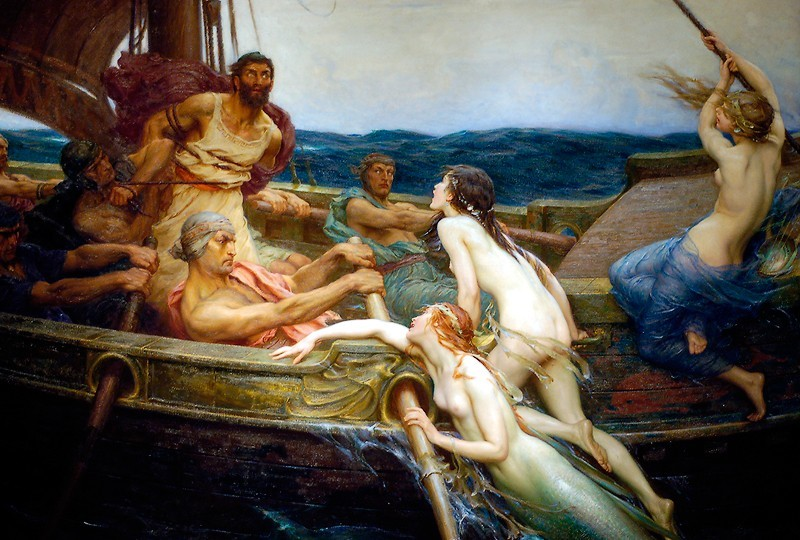
Ulysses and the Sirens by H.J. Draper (1909)

Self-control is the ability to regulate one's emotions, thoughts, and behavior in the face of temptations and impulses. It is an aspect of inhibitory control, one of the core human executive functions. Executive functions are cognitive processes that are necessary for regulating one's behavior in order to achieve specific goals.

As an executive function, self-control supports goal-directed behavior, planning, and decision making. In psychology, self-control is often distinguished from the broader construct of self-regulation, which includes the monitoring, adjustment, and maintenance of behavior and emotional states across changing situations.

One influential model has described self-control as operating like a muscle that draws on a limited resource.

In the short term, use of self-control can lead to the depletion of that resource. However, in the long term, the use of self-control can strengthen and improve the ability to control oneself over time.

Self-control is also a key concept in the general theory of crime, a major theory in criminology. The theory was developed by Michael Gottfredson and Travis Hirschi in their book A General Theory of Crime (1990). Gottfredson and Hirschi define self-control as the differentiating tendency of individuals to avoid criminal acts independent of the situations in which they find themselves. Individuals with low self-control tend to be impulsive, inconsiderate towards others, risk takers, short-sighted, and nonverbal-oriented. About 70 percent of the variance in questionnaire measures of this construct of self-control has been found to be attributable to genetic factors.

== Self-control in science ==
=== Counteractive self-control ===
Counteractive self-control theory focuses on how desires interact with goals. Desire is an affectively charged motivation toward a certain object, person, or activity, often, but not limited to, one associated with pleasure or relief from displeasure. Desires differ in their intensity and longevity. A desire becomes a temptation when pursuing it would conflict with an individual's goals. One limitation in researching desire is that people experience a wide variety of desires, which differ in frequency, strength, and relevance to personal goals. In a large experience-sampling study, 7,827 desire reports were collected over one week, capturing variation in desire intensity, the degree of conflict with other goals, and the likelihood of resisting a desire successfully. The most common and strongly felt desires were those related to bodily needs such as eating, drinking, and sleeping.

Self-control dilemmas occur when long-term goals clash with short-term outcomes. Counteractive Self-Control Theory states that when presented with such a dilemma, we lessen the significance of the instant rewards while momentarily increasing the importance of our overall values. When asked to rate the perceived appeal of different snacks before making a decision, people valued health bars over chocolate bars. However, when asked to do the rankings after having chosen a snack, there was no significant difference of appeal. Further, when college students completed a questionnaire prior to their course registration deadline, they ranked leisure activities as less important and enjoyable than when they filled out the survey after the deadline passed. The stronger and more available the temptation is, the harsher the devaluation will be.

One of the most common self-control dilemmas involves the desire for unhealthy or unneeded food consumption versus the desire to maintain long-term health. An indication of unneeded food consumption could be overspending on eating away from home. Not knowing how much to spend, or overspending one's budget on eating out, can be a symptom of a lack of self-control.

Participants in one study rated a new snack as less healthy when it was described as very tasty rather than only slightly tasty. This evaluation pattern reflects counteractive self-control, where a tempting attribute leads people to devalue that option to support a health goal. In another experiment, participants shown one large bowl of chips—representing a strong temptation—perceived the chips as higher in calories and ate less of them than participants given three smaller bowls containing the same total amount.

Weak temptations are falsely perceived to be less unhealthy, so self-control is not triggered and desirable actions are more often engaged in; this supports the counteractive self-control theory. Weak temptations present more of a challenge to overcome than strong temptations, because they appear less likely to compromise long-term values.

=== Satiation ===
In studies of self-control, satiation refers to the reduction in desire for a particular food following repeated consumption or exposure. Satiation rates when eating depend on the interactions of trait self-control and the healthiness of the food. After eating equal amounts of either clearly healthy (raisins and peanuts) or unhealthy (M&Ms and Skittles) snack foods, people who scored higher on trait self-control tests reported feeling significantly less desire to eat more of the unhealthy foods than they did the healthy foods. Those with low trait self-control satiated at the same pace regardless of health value.

Further, when reading a description emphasizing the sweet flavor of their snack, participants with higher trait self-control reported a decrease in desire faster than they did after hearing a description of the healthy benefits of their snack. Once again, those with low self-control satiated at the same rate regardless of the description. Perceiving a food as unhealthy, regardless of its actual health level, relates to faster satiation, but only for people with high trait self-control.

=== Construal levels ===
High-level construals involve thinking about actions and outcomes in a broad, abstract way, whereas low-level construals involve thinking about them in concrete, detailed terms. These different construal levels influence how individuals activate self-control when facing temptations.

One way researchers induce high-level construals is by asking a series of "why?" questions that prompt increasingly abstract responses; low-level construals are elicited with "how?" questions that focus on concrete details. When completing an Implicit Association Test, participants induced into high-level construals pair unhealthy temptations (such as candy bars) with "bad" and healthy options (such as apples) with "good" more quickly than low-level participants. They are also more likely to choose an apple over a candy bar in behavioral tasks. Even without deliberate self-control, simply adopting a high-level construal can reduce the pull of temptations by shifting attention to broader goals and values, such as maintaining a healthy lifestyle.

=== Human and non-human ===
Positive correlation between linguistic capability and self-control has been inferred from experiments with common chimpanzees.

Human self-control research is often modeled using a token economy system, in which individuals earn tokens for desirable behaviors and can later exchange the tokens for various backup, positive reinforcers. Differences in research designs have raised questions about whether human and non-human studies are always comparable. One procedural difference involves delays in the token-exchange period: non-human subjects can usually access reinforcement immediately, whereas human subjects often wait until the end of a session to exchange tokens. When similar delays were imposed on non-human subjects such as pigeons, they responded much like humans, with males showing less self-control than females.

Logue, whose work is discussed further below, reports that in her research, it was boys who displayed less self-control than girls. She notes that in adulthood, sex differences tend to diminish as individuals become more aware of the consequences associated with impulsive actions. This may suggest that the ability to exert self-control improves with maturity and experience.

Some theorists have noted that impulsive responses can be adaptive in certain contexts, although far less research has examined this possibility compared to work emphasizing the benefits of self-control.

Self-control has been conceptualized as a measurable human trait, and numerous tests have been developed to assess it. Longitudinal research has found that individuals with higher self-control often achieve better educational, occupational, and psychosocial outcomes, although evidence regarding its long-term health implications is mixed.

The construct known as John Henryism describes a high-effort coping style proposed by socio-epidemiologist Sherman James. It characterizes individuals who persistently exert effort to overcome social and economic barriers, even when resources are limited. James's research linked this coping pattern to elevated risks of hypertension and cardiovascular strain among Black Americans in North Carolina, particularly in contexts of chronic stress and disadvantage. The term draws on the American folk hero John Henry, whose legendary death followed intense physical labor; the concept has since been discussed in both academic and popular accounts of stress and health inequalities.

=== Alternatives ===
Using compassion, gratitude, and healthy pride to create positive emotional motivation can be less stressful, less vulnerable to rationalization, and more likely to succeed than the traditional strategy of using logic and willpower to suppress behavior that resonates emotionally. Similarly, the use of healthy habits and strategies that eliminate the need for effortful inhibition reduce reliance on willpower.

Philosopher Immanuel Kant, at the beginning of one of his main works, Groundwork of the Metaphysics of Morals, mentions the term "Selbstbeherrschung"—self-control—in a way such that it does not play a key role in his account of virtue. He argues instead that qualities such as self-control and moderation of affect and passions are mistakenly taken to be absolutely good.

== Skinner's survey of techniques ==
B.F. Skinner's Science and Human Behavior provides a survey of nine categories of self-control methods.

=== Physical restraint and physical aid ===
The manipulation of the environment to make some responses easier to physically execute and others more difficult illustrates this principle. This can be physical guidance: the application of physical contact to induce an individual to go through the motions of a desired behavior. It can also be a physical prompt. Examples of this include clapping one's hand over one's own mouth, placing one's hand in one's pocket to prevent fidgeting, and using a 'bridge' hand position to steady a pool shot; these all represent physical methods to affect behavior.

=== Changing the stimulus ===
Manipulating the occasion for behaviour may change behaviour as well. Removing distractions that induce undesired actions or adding a prompt to induce them are examples. Hiding temptation and leaving reminders are two more. The need to hide temptation is a result of temptation's effect on the mind.

A common theme among studies of desire is an investigation of the underlying cognitive processes of a craving for an addictive substance, such as nicotine or alcohol. To clarify the cognitive processes involved in craving, researchers developed the Elaborated Intrusion (EI) theory. According to EI, craving persists because individuals develop mental images of the coveted substance that are themselves pleasurable, but which also increase their awareness of deficit. The result is a cruel circle of desire, imagery, and preparation to satisfy the desire. This quickly escalates into greater expression of the imagery that incorporates working memory, interferes with performance on simultaneous cognitive tasks, and strengthens the emotional response. Essentially the mind is consumed by the craving for a desired substance, and this craving in turn interrupts any concurrent cognitive tasks. A craving for nicotine or alcohol is an extreme case, but EI theory also applies to more ordinary motivations and desires.

=== Depriving and satiating ===
Deprivation refers to a period during which an individual has not received a reinforcer, which increases the reinforcer's effectiveness. Satiation occurs when an individual has received a reinforcer to the point that it temporarily loses its reinforcing power. If a stimulus is withheld, its reinforcing value tends to increase. For example, a person deprived of food may go to great lengths to obtain it. Conversely, after eating a large meal, a person may no longer be motivated by the prospect of dessert.

One may manipulate one's own behavior by affecting states of deprivation or satiation. By skipping a meal before a free dinner one may more effectively capitalize on the free meal. By eating a healthy snack beforehand, the temptation to eat free "junk food" is reduced.

Imagery is important in desire cognition during a state of deprivation. One study divided smokers into two groups: The control group was instructed to continue smoking as usual until they arrived at the laboratory, where they were then asked to read a multisensory neutral script (one not related to a craving for nicotine). The experimental group, however, was asked to abstain from smoking before coming to the laboratory in order to induce craving, and upon their arrival were told to read a multisensory urge-induction script intended to intensify their nicotine craving. After the participants finished reading the script they rated their craving for cigarettes. Next they formulated visual or auditory images when prompted with verbal cues such as "a game of tennis" or "a telephone ringing". After this task the participants again rated their craving for cigarettes. The study found that the craving experienced by the abstaining smokers was decreased to the control group's level by visual imagery but not by auditory imagery alone. That mental imagery served to reduce the level of craving in smokers suggests that it can be used as a method of self-control during times of deprivation.

=== Manipulating emotional conditions ===
Manipulating emotional conditions can induce certain ways of responding. One example of this can be seen in theatre. Actors often elicit tears from their own painful memories if it is necessary for the character they are playing to cry. One may read a letter or book, listen to music, or watch a movie, in order to get in the proper state of mind for a certain event or function. Additionally, considering an activity either as "work" or as "fun" can have an effect on the difficulty of self-control.

To analyze the possible effects of the cognitive transformation of an object on desire, a study was conducted on 71 undergraduate students, all of whom were familiar with a particular chocolate product. The participants were randomly assigned to one of three groups: the control condition, the consummatory condition, and the non-consummatory transformation condition. Each group was then given three minutes to complete their assigned task. The participants in the control condition were told to read a neutral article, about a location in South America, that was devoid of any words associated with food consumption. Those in the consummatory condition were instructed to imagine as clearly as possible how consuming the chocolate would taste and feel. The participants in the non-consummatory transformation condition were told to imagine as clearly as possible odd settings or uses for the chocolate. Next, all the participants underwent a manipulation task that required them to rate their mood on a five-point scale in response to ten items they viewed. Following the manipulation task, participants completed automatic evaluations that measured their reaction time to six different images of the chocolate, each of which was paired with a positive or a negative stimuli. The results showed that the participants instructed to imagine the consumption of the chocolate demonstrated higher automatic evaluations toward the chocolate, as measured by faster reaction times to positive chocolate-related stimuli, than did the participants told to imagine odd settings or uses for the chocolate, and participants in the control condition fell in-between the two experimental conditions. This indicates that the manner in which one considers an item influences how much it is desired.

=== Using aversive stimulation ===
Aversive stimulation is used as a means of increasing or decreasing the likelihood of target behavior. An aversive stimulus is sometimes referred to as a "punisher" or an "aversive". Punishment in behavioral psychology is defined in terms of its effect on behavior. A behavior is considered punished when it is followed by a consequence that reduces the likelihood of that behavior occurring again. For example, if a teenager stays out past curfew and their parents respond by grounding them, the grounding functions as a punisher that is intended to decrease the chance of the teenager repeating the behavior.

=== Drugs ===
In behavioral psychology, drugs are viewed as variables that can alter the strength or likelihood of operant behavior by affecting how an individual responds to reinforcement or punishment. Some drugs increase a person's capacity for inhibitory control, which can reduce impulsive responses, while others impair this capacity and weaken self-control. Because drug effects can change the rate at which behaviors occur, they are sometimes studied as antecedent conditions that modify how reinforcement functions in a given situation.

Research on drug effects has shown that low therapeutic doses of stimulant medications, including methylphenidate and amphetamine can improve inhibitory control and are therefore used clinically to treat ADHD. In contrast, very high doses of amphetamine can disrupt working memory and interfere with self-control. Alcohol has also been shown to impair self-control. These findings illustrate how pharmacological factors can influence the conditions under which self-controlled or impulsive behaviors occur.

=== Operant conditioning ===
Operant conditioning is a process in which behavior changes according to the consequences that follow it, which increase or decrease its future likelihood. A behavior that is altered by its consequences is known as operant behavior. There are multiple components of operant conditioning. These include reinforcement such as positive reinforcers and negative reinforcers. A positive reinforcer is a stimulus which, when presented immediately following a behavior, causes the behavior to increase in frequency. Negative reinforcers are stimuli whose removal immediately after a response cause the response to be strengthened or to increase in frequency. Components of punishment are also included, such as positive punishment and negative punishment. For example, if a student tells a joke and classmates laugh, the increase in social approval makes the student more likely to tell jokes in the future. If the response is negative, such as criticism or disapproval, the likelihood of telling another joke decreases.

=== Self-punishment ===
Self-punishment refers to arranging a punishing consequence for one's own behavior in order to reduce its future likelihood. In Skinner's account, this differs from the use of aversive stimulation because it is applied after the behavior rather than beforehand. For example, a person may impose a corrective task or unpleasant consequence on themselves following a response they want to discourage. In operant terms, the individual is attempting to decrease a behavior by linking it to a self-selected punishing outcome.

Skinner noted that punishment is generally an ineffective method of self-control. Although punishment can suppress a behavior temporarily, it does not eliminate it and often produces unwanted effects such as avoidance or emotional responses. Punishment also fails to teach alternative behaviors and tends to shift control to external consequences rather than helping a person arrange their own behavior. For these reasons, Skinner regarded punishment as a weak and unreliable strategy for managing one's own actions.

=== Incompatible responses ("doing something else") ===
Skinner described another self-control technique in which a person engages in a behavior that is incompatible with the action they wish to prevent. By performing an alternative response that cannot occur at the same time as the undesired one, the individual reduces the likelihood of the unwanted behavior. For example, a person might feel the impulse to engage in an unwanted habit for which they use their hands and choose to distract themselves by doing something else that also engages the hands, such as writing or a craft-based activity.

== Brain regions involved ==
Functional imaging of the brain has shown that self-control correlates with activity in an area in the dorsolateral prefrontal cortex (dlPFC), a part of the frontal lobe. This area is distinct from those involved in generating intentional actions or selecting between alternatives. Self-control occurs through top-down inhibition of the premotor cortex, involving perception and mental effort to rein in behavior and action as opposed to allowing emotions or sensory experience (bottom-up) to control and drive behavior. Researchers propose differing models of how self-control operates and develops. One account emphasises a bottom-up approach, relying on sensory experience and immediate stimuli to guide self-control behavior. The more time a person spends thinking about a rewarding stimulus, the more likely he or she will experience a desire for it. Information judged as important is more likely to enter working memory, where it can be processed through top-down mechanisms. Evidence suggests that top-down processing plays a strong role in self-control. Top-down processing can regulate bottom-up attentional mechanisms. To demonstrate this, researchers studied working memory and distraction by presenting participants with neutral or negative pictures and then a math problem or no task. They found that participants reported less negative moods after solving the math problem compared to the no task group, which they attributed to an influence on working memory capacity.

Researchers use a wide range of methods to investigate the neural basis of self-control, including fMRI studies in humans, electrophysiological recordings in animals, lesion studies, and clinical observations. Much of this research relies on tasks that measure general executive functions rather than self-control directly, such as response inhibition and decision-making paradigms. Although these tasks are not specific to self-control, they provide insight into the cognitive and neural processes that support it.

=== Prefrontal cortex ===
The prefrontal cortex is located in the most anterior portion of the frontal lobe. It constitutes a larger proportion of the cortex in humans, taking up about a third of the cortex, and being far more complex than in other animals. The dendrites in the prefrontal cortex contain up to 16 times more dendritic spines per neuron than in other cortical areas. This high number of dendritic spines supports the integration of diverse information in the prefrontal cortex. The orbitofrontal cortex contributes to self-control by evaluating the relative value of immediate versus delayed rewards. When individuals choose a larger delayed reward over a smaller immediate one, the orbitofrontal cortex supports the suppression of the immediate impulse. Damage to this area weakens this process, making immediate reinforcement more likely. Lack of impulse control in children may reflect the low developmental trajectory of the prefrontal cortex.

Todd A. Hare et al. use functional MRI to examine how prefrontal regions contribute to self-control. They found that the ventromedial prefrontal cortex (vmPFC) represented the subjective value of available options, including immediate, pleasurable rewards. Successful self-control involved increased engagement of the dorsolateral prefrontal cortex (dlPFC), which modulated vmPFC activity to favor choices aligned with longer-term goals. Reduced dlPFC recruitment was associated with poorer self-control performance.

=== Outcome factors influencing choice ===
Alexandra W. Logue has described how characteristics of outcomes influence whether people choose a self-controlled option. She identifies three main outcome dimensions: delay, size, and contingency.

outcome delays
A delay in a positive outcome results in the perception that the outcome is less valuable than an outcome available immediately. The devaluing of the delayed outcome can reduce self-control. One way to increase self-control in situations involving delayed outcomes is to pre-expose or partially provide the outcome, which reduces the frustration associated with waiting. Signing bonuses are an example of this strategy, because they give part of a reward upfront to increase commitment to a delayed benefit.

outcome size
Outcome size refers to the magnitude of the reward. Larger outcomes are typically judged as more valuable than smaller ones. Factors such as delay, effort and uncertainty can decrease the perceived value of an outcome, and people generally choose the option that carries the highest perceived value at the time of the decision.

outcome contingencies
Outcome contingencies refer to the relationship between a person's actions and the outcomes they produce. People are more likely to choose impulsively when the contingency allows them to change their decision after the fact. By contrast, self-control improves when the contingency is arranged so that only the self-controlled response leads to the desired outcome. Precommitment actions illustrate this principle. For example, when someone sets an alarm clock to ensure they get up early, they are creating a contingency that supports the later self-controlled choice to wake up rather than stay in bed.

Cassandra B. Whyte studied locus of control, which refers to whether people attribute outcomes to their own actions (internal locus) or to external forces beyond their control (external locus). She found that students with a more internal locus of control performed better academically, and argued that this was because they believed their choices could meaningfully influence results. When people expect outcomes to follow from their own behavior, they tend to engage more actively in decision-making than when outcomes are seen as externally determined.

=== Glucose and self control ===
Research has proposed that self-control performance may be influenced by glucose availability in the brain. Early studies reported that engaging in acts of self-control reduced circulating glucose, and that lower glucose levels or reduced glucose tolerance were associated with poorer performance on subsequent self-control tasks, particularly under demanding or novel conditions. These findings formed the basis of the glucose-depletion model, which proposed that self-control is metabolically costly and reliant on accessible glucose.

A competing account argues that the key factor is not total glucose supply but the allocation of glucose to effortful tasks. Under this view, the brain generally has sufficient metabolic resources, but motivational priorities determine whether glucose is directed to mechanisms supporting self-control. As of 2024, this allocation-based model has not been empirically tested.

== "Marshmallow test" ==
The marshmallow test refers to a series of delay-of-gratification studies begun by Walter Mischel and colleagues at the Stanford Bing Nursery School in the late 1960s. In these experiments, preschool children were offered a single marshmallow immediately, or a larger reward if they waited for a specified period. The procedure aimed to measure children's ability to delay gratification under controlled conditions.

Follow-up studies of the original preschool participants in adolescence and adulthood reported that longer waiting times in the initial marshmallow test were modestly associated with later academic achievement, social functioning, and self-regulation. These associations were correlational, and later work emphasized that delay behavior reflects a combination of cognitive strategies, temperament, and environmental reliability rather than a stable trait.

Later research extended the delay-of-gratification paradigm using neuroimaging. A study by Casey and colleagues (2011) examined adults who had participated in earlier delay-of-gratification studies and found that individuals who had shown lower delay ability in childhood exhibited greater ventral striatal activation during tasks involving immediate rewards, whereas higher delayers showed increased recruitment of prefrontal control regions. These neural differences were observed during a go/no-go task rather than a repetition of the original marshmallow test, and do not indicate that the original participants underwent MRI scanning in childhood.

The interpretation of the marshmallow test was later reassessed in a large replication study by Watts, Duncan, and Quan (2018). Using a more socioeconomically diverse sample and extensive controls for family background, cognitive ability, and early environment, the authors found that the predictive power of delay time was substantially reduced. Once these factors were accounted for, delay behavior showed only small associations with later outcomes. This work suggested that what appeared to be a stable individual difference in self-control was instead strongly influenced by contextual variables, including household reliability and resource stability.

== Ego depletion ==
Ego depletion is a hypothesis which proposes that performing acts of self-control temporarily reduces a person's capacity for subsequent self-control. Early experiments suggested that sustained self-regulation could impair later performance, and various interventions were explored to mitigate these affects, including practising self-awareness, motivational incentives, and self-control training.

However, there is conflicting evidence about whether ego depletion is a real effect; meta-analyses have mostly found no evidence that the effect exists.

== Self-control in philosophy and theology ==
Aristotle spoke about self-control as a key value that can guide decision making and support a good life. He contrasted self-control with the vice of akrasia which he described as acting against one's better judgment.. In his Nicomachean Ethics, Aristotle discussed the significance of this value in leading a virtuous life. Similarly, Plato wrote about self-control in relation to both mental and physical pleasures.

Examples of self-control as a virtue appear in Aristotle's treatment of temperance, which involves having a well-chosen and well-regulated set of desires. The vices associated with failures of temperance are self-indulgence (excess) and insensibility (deficiency). Deficiency or excess refers to the degree to which temperance is present. For example, a deficiency of temperance leads to overindulgence, while too much restraint can result in insensitivity or unreasonable control. Aristotle used the following analogy: the intemperate person is like a city with bad laws; the person without self-control is like a city with good laws that are not enforced.

== See also ==
- Akrasia
- Amygdala hijack
- Attentional control
- Darwinian hedonism
- Deferred gratification
- Emotional self-regulation
- Free will
- Impulse control disorder
- Junzi
- Operant conditioning
- Outline of self
- Radical behaviorism
- Rubicon model (psychology)
- Self-control theory of crime
- Self-discipline
- Seven deadly sins
- Stiff upper lip
- Stimulus control
- Verbal Behavior (book)
- Walden Two
