= Regiment of Light Dragoons (United States) =

- Active: 1798 — 1800 (RoLD, 1798); 1808 — 1815 (RoLD, 1808)
- Disbanded: June 15, 1800 (RoLD, 1798); May 17, 1815 (RoLD, 1808)
- Country: United States
- Branch: United States Army
- Type: Dragoons
- Size: Regiment
- Weapons: Sabers; Pistols
- Campaigns: RoLD, 1798: Quasi-War; RoLD, 1808: War of 1812; Bladensburg; Chippewa

Commanders
- Commanders: RoLD, 1798: John Watts (1799-1800); RoLD, 1808: Wade Hampton (1808-1809); Leonard Covington (1809-1813); Jacint Laval (1813-1814); James Burn (1814-1815)

Under the designation Regiment of Light Dragoons existed two different units of the U.S. Army in the late eighteenth and early nineteenth centuries, respectively. A first unit of its name was short lived, established just prior the Quasi-War with France, in 1798 and discharged in 1800.

The second unit under this designation was activated in 1808. During the War of 1812, it was temporarily designated as the 1st Regiment of Light Dragoons when the War Department created an additional similar regiment. On May 12, 1814, the additional regiment was consolidated with the 1st Regiment, which reverted to its unnumbered designation. The regiment was consolidated with the Corps of Artillery on May 17, 1815.

The very first unit of the U.S. Army designed as Light Dragoons was a single Squadron of Light Dragoons, assigned to the Legion of the United States, by September 1792.

All these units followed the model of the British Regiments of Light Dragoons that were established in the 1750s.

== Background ==
The RoLD (1798) was formed on July 16, 1798, at the peak of the XYZ Affair and the upcoming Quasi-war with France.

The RoLD (1808) was established on April 12, 1808, following the Chesapeake–Leopard affair, when an Act of Congress passed legislation authorizing an increase in the size of the U.S. Army, to include a regiment of dragoons.

== Organization ==
The origins of the RoLD (1798) traces back to the Squadron of Light Dragoons, established on March 5, 1792. The squadron's four troops were assigned by September 1792 to each of the four sublegions of Legion of the United States. By November 1796 the number of these troops was reduced to only two. Two years later, they were amalgamated with six newly raised troops to the Regiment of Light Dragoons. The RoLD (1798) was never completely mounted and parts of it saw service as light infantry before the regiment was dissolved in June 1800. Its two oldest "veterans" troops were discharged on June 1, 1802.

The RoLD (1808) consisted of a regimental headquarters and eight troops. The regiment was never completely organized or mounted and served as light infantry. It was re-designated the 1st Regiment of Light Dragoons since an act on January 11, 1812, created a second regiment (2nd Regiment of Light Dragoons). A further act of Congress of March 30, 1814 resulted in the two regiments being consolidated, on May 12, 1814, into one Regiment of Light Dragoons with eight troops. An act of March 3, 1815 reducing the size of the army led to the regiment being consolidated with the Corps of Artillery on May 17, 1815. Officers whose services were no longer required were discharged on June 15, 1815.

== Service ==
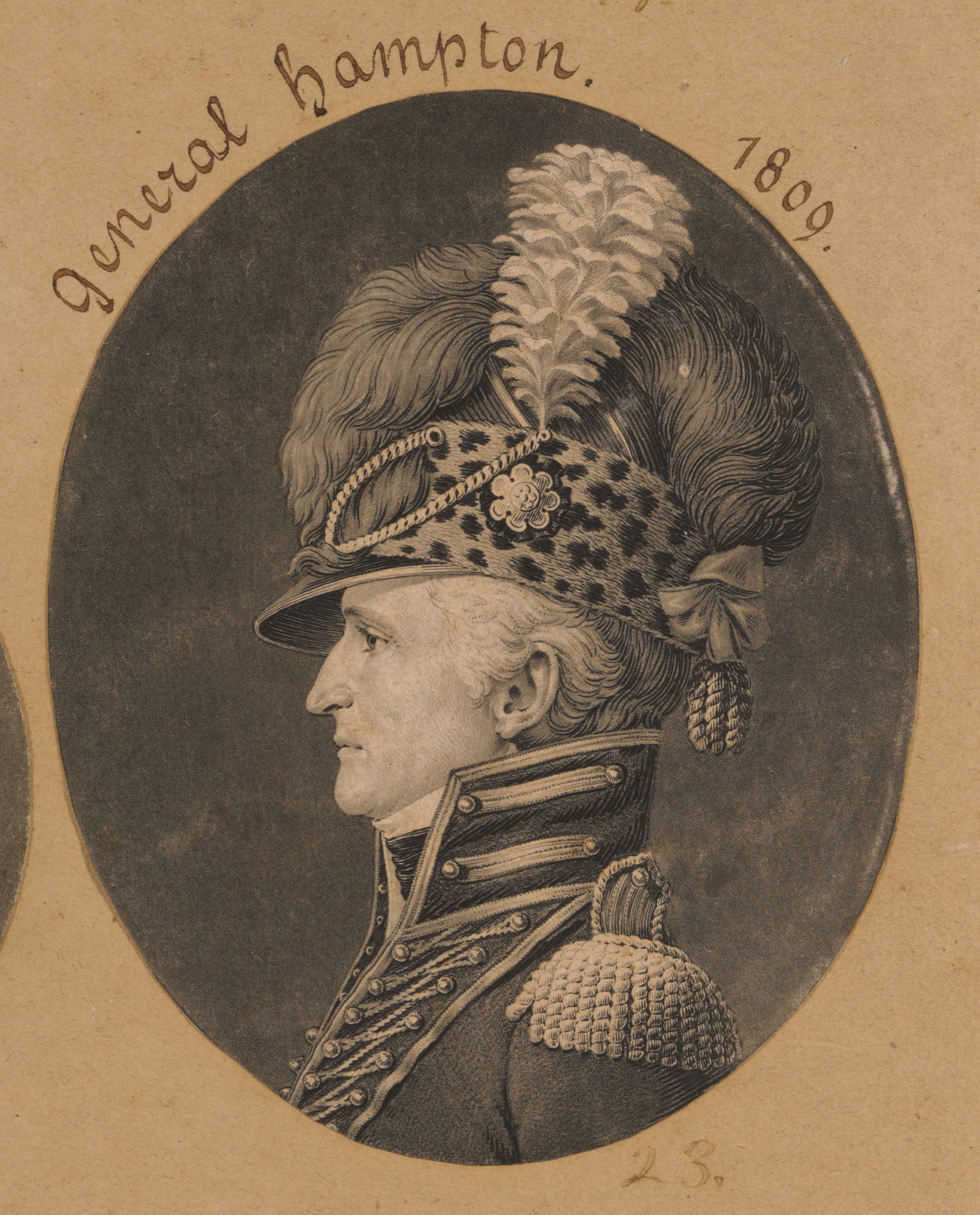
1809 portrait of Wade Hampton I by Charles Balthazar Julien Févret de Saint-Mémin

Neither the 1st nor the 2nd Regiment were used as consolidated units during the War of 1812. Generals frequently used their assigned dragoons as escorts, couriers and scouts rather than fighting men.

=== Raid in Massena ===
On April 13, 1813, Colonel Zebulon Pike ordered a force of 50 men, consisting of light dragoons and riflemen, to raid American smuggling operations at Massena, New York. The raiders successfully discovered the smugglers, bringing eight prisoners back to Sackets Harbor, New York. All eight men were accused of smuggling goods across the border with Canada and "consorting with the enemy".

=== Second Battle of Sacket’s Harbor ===
The regiment fought at the Second Battle of Sacket's Harbor on May 29, 1813. During the battle, Lieutenant Colonel Electus Backus rallied American forces, including the regiment's dragoons, to counterattack a British breakthrough on the second American defensive line. The troops Backus rallied fired at the British behind a treeline, inflicting several casualties on the attackers. However, the British conducted a bayonet charge which forced the Regiment of Light Dragoons to retreat to the third defensive line, which consisted of several blockhouses.

Before the British could overrun the third defensive line, American General Jacob Brown arrived with 300 militia making a feint towards the British ships. In order to prevent themselves from being overwhelmed by Brown's troops, the attackers retreated back to their boats. Through managing to prevent Sacket's Harbor from being captured, the Americans had suffered heavy casualties; Backus was mortally wounded, and died of his injuries on June 7.

=== Reconnaissance Patrol in Ogdensburg ===
On October 13, 1813, the regiment entered Ogdensburg, New York on reconnaissance for General James Wilkinson. The British responded by shelling of Ogdensburg with artillery. To avoid being spotted and engaged, the regiment withdrew from Ogdensburg into the backcountry. Its troops were then distributed in small parties along the river for the purpose of scouting the region and preventing British from obtaining information and supplies.

=== Engagement at Red Mills ===
On October 16, 1813, the British officer Francis Cockburn, commanding 200 troops, attacked a detachment of 13 American light dragoons performing reconnaissance duties out of a house in Red Mills. The Americans had placed sentries around the house, but the British surprised the sentries and surrounded the house. Two dragoons escaped the house and fled while the rest were killed or captured. Cockburn's troops captured a lieutenant and seven other dragoons. Two dragoons were killed and one was wounded; left for dead, he survived and eventually recovered. The British returned to Canada with their prisoners and captured horses.

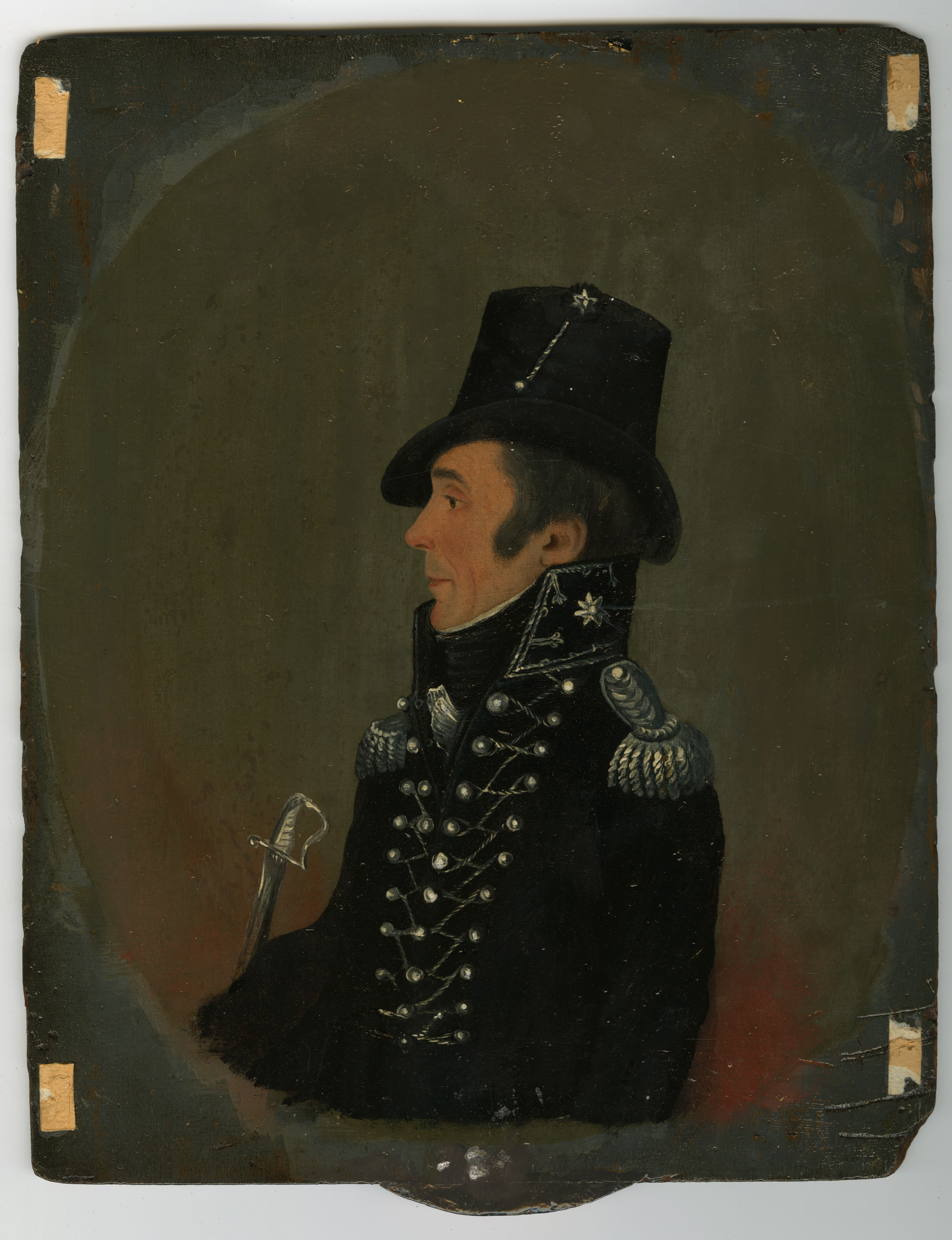
Colonel Jacint Laval, commander of the Light Dragoons at Bladensburg.

=== Bladensburg and Baltimore ===
At the Battle of Bladensburg on August 24, 1814, Lieutenant Colonel Jacint Laval led 140 men of the regiment. Laval's troops were placed in support of infantrymen who later broke and ran. Many of the dragoons joined the disorderly retreat. Laval led his remaining troops in an orderly retreat toward Georgetown.

Laval's dragoons took part in the Battle of Baltimore on September 14, 1814. The dragoons conducted a rear guard action in a fighting retreat with Stansbury's brigade who were withdrawing to Baltimore. Once the Americans discovered that the British were withdrawing from the area around Baltimore, they pursued them but were very exhausted and could only capture a few stragglers.

=== Skirmish at Kirby’s Windmill ===
On October 31, 1814, American Major Robert Crutchfield, leading a combined brigade which included light dragoons under Captain John A. Burd, attempted to ambush a British amphibious raiding force consisting of Royal Marines and Royal Navy sailors. Burd's dragoons were ordered to ambush the raiding force in conjunction with the rest of the brigade. However, Burd and his dragoons charged the British when they spotted them instead of waiting for the rest of Crutchfield's brigade. The troops the dragoons attacked were surprised and asked for quarter, though someone shouted an order to retreat and the dragoons began withdrawing. Burd realizing the error, ordered his men to form up and charge again, though by this point the formerly surrendering troops had regrouped and formed a defensive line behind a fence breastwork.

The British proceeded to fire a volley at the charging dragoons, wounding Burd. The dragoons withdrew with two prisoners, having suffering two men wounded and a further two captured. The rest of the brigade finally arrived as the raiding party was withdrawing in an orderly matter onto their barges. The Americans opened fire with their small arms and cannons, slightly damaging two barges, but the British warships offshore bombarded Crutchfield's brigade, scattering it and allowing the British to withdraw safely. Despite being forced to withdraw, the brigade captured five more prisoners.
