= Classical school (criminology) =

School of thought in criminology

In criminology, the classical school usually refers to the 18th-century work during the Enlightenment by the utilitarian and social-contract philosophers Jeremy Bentham and Cesare Beccaria. Their interests lay in the system of criminal justice and penology and indirectly through the proposition that "man is a calculating animal," in the causes of criminal behavior. The classical school of thought was premised on the idea that people have free will in making decisions, and that punishment can be a deterrent for crime, so long as the punishment is proportional, fits the crime, and is carried out promptly.

== Reform ==
The system of law in the European tradition, its mechanisms of enforcement and the forms of punishment used prior to the expanse of thought in ideas of crime in the late 18th and early 19th century, were primitive and inconsistent, mainly due to the domination of semi religious, demonological explanations. Judges were not professionally trained so many of their decisions were unsatisfactory being the product of incompetence, capriciousness, corruption, and political manipulation. The use of torture to extract confessions and a wide range of cruel punishments such as whipping, mutilation, and public executions was commonplace. A need for legal rationality and fairness was identified and found an audience among the emerging middle-classes whose economic interests lay in providing better systems for supporting national and international trade.

== The social contract ==
John Locke considered the mechanism that had allowed monarchies to become the primary form of government. He concluded that monarchs had asserted the right to rule and enforced it either through an exercise in raw power or through a form of contract, e.g. the feudal system had depended on the grants of estates inland as a return for services provided to the sovereign. Locke proposed that all citizens are equal and that there is an unwritten but voluntary contract between the state and its citizens, giving power to those in government and defining a framework of mutual rights and duties. In Leviathan, Thomas Hobbes wrote, "the right of all sovereigns is derived from the consent of every one of those who are to be governed." This is a shift from authoritarianism to an early model of European and North American democracy where police powers and the system of punishment are means to a more just end.

== Beccaria ==
In 1764, he published Dei Delitti e Delle Pene (On Crimes and Punishments) arguing for the need to reform the criminal justice system by referring not to the harm caused to the victim, but to the harm caused to society. This is based on the belief that to avoid social chaos, members of society are compelled to sacrifice their liberty to the nation state in order to prevent some members to infringe on the liberty of others. In the book, he explains that the greatest deterrent was the certainty of detection: the more swift and certain the punishment, the more effective it would be. It would also allow a less serious punishment to be effective if shame and an acknowledgement of wrongdoing was a guaranteed response to society's judgment. Thus, the prevention of crime was achieved through a proportional system that was clear and simple to understand, and if the entire nation united in their own defense. His approach influenced the codification movement which set sentencing tariffs to ensure equality of treatment among offenders. Later, it was acknowledged that not all offenders are alike and greater sentencing discretion was allowed to judges.

As for the reasoning behind why criminals commit crime, Beccaria was of the opinion that crime was a result of bad laws, economic stature, and poverty, and that too harsh a punishment on one aspect of crime leads to another being seen as a preferable alternative. He believed the reason behind crime was that individuals could not find a good enough reason to not commit transgressions aside from punishment. He describes the reasoning of a thief as follows:

"What are these laws that I am supposed to respect, that place such a great distance between me and the rich man? He refuses me the penny I ask of him and, as an excuse, tells me to sweat at work he knows nothing about. Who made these laws? Rich and powerful men who have never deigned to visit the squalid huts of the poor, who have never had to share a crust of mouldy bread amid the innocent cries of hungry children and the tears of a wife. Let us break these bonds, fatal to the majority and only useful to a few indolent tyrants; let us attack the injustice at its source. I will return to my natural state of independence; I shall at least for a little time live free and happy with the fruits of my courage and industry. The day will perhaps come for my sorrow and repentance, but it will be brief, and for a single day of suffering I shall have many years of liberty and of pleasures. As King over a few, I will correct the mistakes of fortune and will see these tyrants grow pale and tremble in the presence of one whom with an insulting flourish of pride they used to dismiss to a lower level than their horses and dogs."

Thus, punishment works at two levels. Because it punishes individuals, it operates as a specific deterrence to those convicted not to reoffend. But the publicity surrounding the trial and the judgment of society represented by the decision of a jury of peers offers a general example to the public of the consequences of committing a crime. He believed that if criminals are afraid of similarly swift justice, they will not offend, and that a long, effective punishment is more frightening than a powerful, brief one. Sellin described Beccaria's replacement of capital punishment with penal servitude to be "worse than death" – its intensity and duration would serve to create a greater impression than a one-time punishment, even one as severe as death.

== Bentham ==
In this context, the most relevant idea was known as the "felicitation principle" of utilitarianism, i.e. that whatever is done should aim to give the greatest happiness to the largest possible number of people in society. Bentham argued that there had been "punishment creep", i.e. that the severity of punishments had slowly increased so that the death penalty was then imposed for more than two hundred offences in England. For example, if rape and homicide were both punished by death, then a rapist would be more likely to kill the victim (as a witness) to reduce the risk of arrest.

Bentham posited that man is a calculating animal who will weigh potential gains against the pain likely to be imposed. If the pain outweighs the gains, he will be deterred and this produces maximal social utility. Therefore, in a rational system, the punishment system must be graduated so that the punishment more closely matches the crime. Punishment is not retribution or revenge because that is morally deficient: the hangman is paying the murder the compliment of imitation.

Bentham's ideas strengthened the principles behind the prison system. Prisons were uncommon in pre-modern times and mostly used to hold those awaiting trial or transport. In Bentham's introduction of the Panopticon in 1791, he outlined prisons as a place to not only punish criminals, but to be a reminder of the repercussions in crime, in line with the classical emphasis on prevention through deterrence.

Bentham's concept has some flaws due to its reliance on two critical assumptions:

- if deterrence is going to work, the potential offender must always act rationally whereas much crime is a spontaneous reaction to a situation or opportunity; and
- if the system graduates a scale of punishment according to the seriousness of the offence, it is assuming that the more serious the harm likely to be caused, the more the criminal has to gain.

== Spiritual explanation of crime ==
Spiritualistic understandings of crime stem from an understanding of life in general that finds most things in life are destined and cannot be controlled: we are born either male or female, either good or bad, and all our actions are decided by a higher being. People have held such beliefs for all of recorded history; "primitive people regarded natural disasters such as famines, floods and plagues as punishments for wrongs they had done to the spiritual powers". These spiritual powers gained strength during the Middle Ages as they bonded with the feudal powers to create the criminal justice system. Under a spiritualistic criminal justice system, crime is a private affair that is conducted between the offender and the victim's family. However, this method proved to be too vengeful, and the state took control of punishment. Spiritual explanations provided an understanding of crime when there was no other way of explaining crime. The problem with this understanding is that it cannot be proven true, and so it was never accepted.

== Neo-Classicism ==
The Neo-classical school (criminology) of the 19th century contributed modifications to pure Classical thought, led by French thinkers such as Henri Joly and René Garraud. It recognized the limits of people in terms of their rationality, separating sane adults from the mentally ill adults, children, the elderly. These revisions bring doubt to the certainty of deterrence preventing crime due to 'rationality' by taking into consideration that the idea of rationality is subjective to the experiences, opinions, and totality of a human being. However, the Neo-classical school retained its emphasis on the rational actor theory save for the identified exceptions. Burke suggests that most of the modern legal system is still caught on the 'awkward theoretical compromise of the rational actor model.'

== Commentary ==
The idea of man as a calculating animal requires the view of crime as a product of a free choice by offenders. The question for policy makers is therefore how to use the institutions of the state to influence citizens to choose not to offend. This theory emerged at the time of the Enlightenment and it contended that it should focus on rationality. But, because it lacks sophistication, it was the operationalised in a mechanical way, assuming that there is a mathematics of deterrence, i.e. a proportional calculation undertaken first by policy makers and then by potential offenders. This school believed that there are constants of value in pain and gain that can swing a decision to offend or not to offend. Not everyone is the same, however, nor has the same view of what constitutes a price worth paying. It also had a certain utopianism in assuming that the policing system could rapidly grow and deliver a better service of investigation and detection. If certainty of punishment is to be achieved, there must be a major investment in policing. As other schools of thought developed, Classicism slowly grew less popular. It has seen revival through the theories of right realism such as rational choice theory.

== See also ==
- Criminology#Schools of thought
- Neo-classical school (criminology)
