= Michael Hindelang =

Criminologist

Michael J. Hindelang
- Born: Michael James Hindelang; June 1, 1945; Detroit, Michigan
- Died: March 27, 1982 (aged 36); Schenectady, New York
- Education: Wayne State University (B.A. 1966, masters' 1967), University of California, Berkeley (doctorate, 1969)
- Occupation: Professor
- Spouse: Mary Lee Newell
- Scientific career
- Workplaces: University at Albany
- Thesis: Personality attributes of self-reported delinquents (1969)

Michael James Hindelang (June 1, 1945 - March 27, 1982) was an American criminologist.

== Early life and education ==
Michael James Hindelang was born in Detroit on June 1, 1945. He received his B.A. in psychology in 1966 and his master's degree in 1967, both from Wayne State University. He received his doctorate in criminology from the University of California, Berkeley in 1969.

== Career ==
In 1970, Hindelang joined the faculty of the University at Albany, where he became a full professor in 1976. He remained on the faculty there until his death. In 1972, he founded the Criminal Justice Research Center at this university. While at the University at Albany he collaborated with, among other researchers, Travis Hirschi, on multiple research projects pertaining to delinquency.

Their collaboration produced a paper regarding the link between IQ and delinquency, as well as the 1981 book Measuring Delinquency, which was co-authored by Hindelang, Hirschi, and Joseph Weis. Hindelang and Hirschi, along with Michael R. Gottfredson, also collaborated on a paper criticizing research on the age-crime curve, a paper which later became one of Hirschi's most famous. However, as Hindelang's health declined, he became unable to contribute more to this paper toward the end of his life. He served as associate editor for the Journal of Research in Crime and Delinquency from 1977 to 1980.

== Death ==
Hindelang died on March 27, 1982, of a brain tumor. He was 36 years old when he died.

== Recognition ==
After Hindelang died in 1982, the Criminal Justice Research Center he founded at the University at Albany was renamed the Hindelang Criminal Justice Research Center. In 1991, the American Society of Criminology created the Michael J. Hindelang Award, which is given annually to a book that the Society thinks "makes the most outstanding contribution to research in criminology" of any book published in the three previous years.
