= Self-regulation theory =

System of conscious personal management

Self-regulation theory (SRT) is a system of conscious, personal management that involves the process of guiding one's own thoughts, behaviors and feelings to reach goals. Self-regulation consists of several stages. In the stages, each individual must function as a contributor to their own motivation, behavior, and development within a network of reciprocally interacting influences.

Roy Baumeister, one of the leading social psychologists who have studied self-regulation, claims it has four components: standards of desirable behavior, motivation to meet standards, monitoring of situations and thoughts that precede breaking said standards and lastly, willpower. Baumeister along with other colleagues developed three models of self-regulation designed to explain its cognitive accessibility: self-regulation as a knowledge structure, strength, or skill. Studies have been conducted to determine that the strength model is generally supported, because it is a limited resource in the brain and only a given amount of self-regulation can occur until that resource is depleted.

SRT can be applied to:

- Impulse control, the management of short-term desires. People with low impulse control are prone to acting on immediate desires. This is one route for such people to find their way to jail as many criminal acts occur in the heat of the moment. For non-violent people it can lead to losing friends through careless outbursts, or financial problems caused by making too many impulsive purchases.
- The cognitive bias known as illusion of control. To the extent that people are driven by internal goals concerned with the exercise of control over their environment, they will seek to reassert control in conditions of chaos, uncertainty or stress. Failing genuine control, one coping strategy will be to fall back on defensive attributions of control—leading to illusions of control (Fenton-O'Creevy et al., 2003).
- Goal attainment and motivation
- Sickness behavior

SRT consists of several stages. First, the patient deliberately monitors one's own behavior and evaluates how this behavior affects one's health. If the desired effect is not realized, the patient changes personal behavior. If the desired effect is realized, the patient reinforces the effect by continuing the behavior. (Kanfer 1970;1971;1980)

Another approach is for the patient to realize a personal health issue and understand the factors involved in that issue. The patient must decide upon an action plan for resolving the health issue. The patient will need to deliberately monitor the results in order to appraise the effects, checking for any necessary changes in the action plan. (Leventhal & Nerenz 1984)

Another factor that can help the patient reach his/her own goal of personal health is to relate to the patient the following: Help them figure out the personal/community views of the illness, appraise the risks involved and give them potential problem-solving/coping skills. Recent clinical applications of self-regulation theory extend beyond individual goal-setting to structured therapeutic interventions. These approaches often integrate staged processes—such as goal clarification, progress monitoring, and feedback loops—with cognitive-behavioral and experiential strategies to strengthen emotional regulation and adaptive coping. This structured format has been associated with improved treatment adherence and sustained behavioral change in psychotherapy contexts. Four components of self-regulation described by Baumeister et al. (2007) are:

- Standards: Of desirable behavior.
- Motivation: To meet standards.
- Monitoring: Of situations and thoughts that precede breaking standards.
- Willpower: Internal strength to control urges

== History and contributors ==
=== Albert Bandura ===
There have been numerous researchers, psychologists and scientists who have studied self-regulatory processes. Albert Bandura, a cognitive psychologist had significant contributions focusing on the acquisition of behaviors that led to the social cognitive theory and social learning theory. His work brought together behavioral and cognitive components in which he concluded that "humans are able to control their behavior through a process known as self-regulation." This led to his known process that contained: self observation, judgment and self response. Self observation (also known as introspection) is a process involving assessing one's own thoughts and feelings in order to inform and motivate the individual to work towards goal setting and become influenced by behavioral changes. Judgement involves an individual comparing his or her performance to their personal or created standards. Lastly, self-response is applied, in which an individual may reward or punish his or herself for success or failure in meeting standard(s). An example of self-response would be rewarding oneself with an extra slice of pie for doing well on an exam.

=== Dale Schunk ===
According to Schunk (2012), Lev Vygotsky who was a Russian psychologist and was a major influence on the rise of constructivism, believed that self-regulation involves the coordination of cognitive processes such as planning, synthesizing and formulating concepts (Henderson & Cunningham, 1994); however, such coordination does not proceed independently of the individual's social environment and culture. In fact, self-regulation is inclusive of the gradual internalization of language and concepts. Schunk's Learning Theories: An Educational Perspective is stated to give a contemporary and historical overview of learning theories for undergraduate and graduate learners

=== Roy Baumeister ===
As a widely studied theory, SRT was also greatly impacted by the well-known social psychologist Roy Baumeister. He described the ability to self-regulate as limited in capacity and through this he coined the term ego depletion. The four components of self-regulation theory described by Roy Baumeister are standards of desirable behavior, motivation to meet standards, monitoring of situations and thoughts that precede breaking standards and willpower, or the internal strength to control urges. In Baumeister's paper titled Self-Regulation Failure: An Overview, he express that self-regulation is complex and multifaceted. Baumeister lays out his "three ingredients" of self-regulation as a case for self-regulation failure.

== Research ==
Many studies have been done to test different variables regarding self-regulation. Albert Bandura studied self-regulation before, after and during the response. He created the triangle of reciprocal determinism that includes behavior, environment and the person (cognitive, emotional and physical factors) that all influence one another. Bandura concluded that the processes of goal attainment and motivation stem from an equal interaction of self-observation, self-reaction, self-evaluation and self-efficacy.

In addition to Bandura's work, psychologists Muraven, Tice and Baumeister conducted a study for self control as a limited resource. They suggested there were three competing models to self-regulation: self-regulation as a strength, knowledge structure and a skill. In the strength model, they indicated it is possible self-regulation could be considered a strength because it requires willpower and thus is a limited resource. Failure to self-regulate could then be explained by depletion of this resource. For self-regulation as a knowledge structure, they theorized it involves a certain amount of knowledge to exert self control, so as with any learned technique, failure to self-regulate could be explained by insufficient knowledge. Lastly, the model involving self-regulation as a skill referred to self-regulation being built up over time and unable to be diminished; therefore, failure to exert would be explained by a lack of skill. They found that self-regulation as a strength is the most feasible model due to studies that have suggested self-regulation is a limited resource.

Dewall, Baumeister, Gailliot and Maner performed a series of experiments instructing participants to perform ego depletion tasks to diminish the self-regulatory resource in the brain, that they theorized to be glucose. This included tasks that required participants to break a familiar habit, where they read an essay and circled words containing the letter 'e' for the first task, then were asked to break that habit by performing a second task where they circled words containing 'e' and/or 'a'. Following this trial, participants were randomly assigned to either the glucose category, where they drank a glass of lemonade made with sugar, or the control group, with lemonade made from Splenda. They were then asked their individual likelihoods of helping certain people in hypothetical situations, for both kin and non-kin and found that excluding kin, people were much less likely to help a person in need if they were in the control group (with Splenda) than if they had replenished their brain glucose supply with the lemonade containing real sugar. This study also supports the model for self-regulation as a strength because it confirms it is a limited resource.

Baumeister and colleagues expanded on this and determined the four components to self-regulation. Those include standards of desirable behavior, motivation to meet these standards, monitoring of situations and thoughts that precede breaking standards and willpower.

== Applications and examples ==
Impulse control in self-regulation involves the separation of our immediate impulses and long-term desires. We can plan, evaluate our actions and refrain from doing things we will regret. Research shows that self-regulation is a strength necessary for emotional well-being. Violation of one's deepest values results in feelings of guilt, which will undermine well-being. The illusion of control involves people overestimating their own ability to control events. Such as, when an event occurs an individual may feel greater a sense of control over the outcome that they demonstrably do not influence. This emphasizes the importance of perception of control over life events.

The self-regulated learning is the process of taking control and evaluating one's own learning and behavior. This emphasizes control by the individual who monitors, directs and regulates actions toward goals of information. In goal attainment self-regulation it is generally described in these four components of self-regulation. Standards, which is the desirable behavior. Motivation, to meet the standards. Monitoring, situations and thoughts that precede breaking standards. Willpower, internal strength to control urges.

Illness behavior in self-regulation deals with issues of tension that arise between holding on and letting go of important values and goals as those are threatened by disease processes. Also people who have poor self-regulatory skills do not succeed in relationships or cannot hold jobs. Sayette (2004) describes failures in self-regulation as in two categories: under regulation and misregualtion. Under regulation is when people fail to control oneself whereas misregualtion deals with having control but does not bring up the desired goal (Sayette, 2004).

== Criticisms/challenges ==
One challenge of self-regulation is that researchers often struggle with conceptualizing and operationalizing self-regulation (Carver & Scheier, 1990). The system of self-regulation comprises a complex set of functions, including research cognition, problem solving, decision making and meta cognition.

Ego depletion refers to self control or willpower drawing from a limited pool of mental resources. If an individual has low mental activity, self control is typically impaired, which may lead to ego depletion. Self control plays a valuable role in the functioning of self in people. The illusion of control involves the overestimation of an individual's ability to control certain events. It occurs when someone feels a sense of control over outcomes although they may not possess this control. Psychologists have consistently emphasized the importance of perceptions of control over life events. Heider proposed that humans have a strong motive to control their environment.

Reciprocal determinism is a theory proposed by Albert Bandura, stating that a person's behavior is influenced both by personal factors and the social environment. Bandura acknowledges the possibility that individual's behavior and personal factors may impact the environment. These can involve skills that are either under or overcompensating the ego and will not benefit the outcome of the situation.

Recently, Baumeister's strength model of ego depletion has been criticized in multiple ways. Meta-analyses found little evidence for the strength model of self-regulation and for glucose as the limited resource that is depleted. A pre-registered trial did not find any evidence for ego depletion. Several commentaries have raised criticism on this particular study. In summary, many central assumptions of the strength model of self-regulation seem to be in need of revision, especially the view of self-regulation as a limited resource that can be depleted and glucose as the fuel that is depleted seems to be hardly defensible without major revisions.

== Conclusion ==
Self-regulation can be applied to many aspects of everyday life, including social situations, personal health management, impulse control and more. Since the strength model is generally supported, ego depletion tasks can be performed to temporarily tax the amount of self-regulatory capabilities in a person's brain. It is theorized that self-regulation depletion is associated with willingness to help people in need, excluding members of an individual's kin. Many researchers have contributed to these findings, including Albert Bandura, Roy Baumeister and Robert Wood.

== See also ==
- Rubicon model
- Emotional self-regulation
