= Jack Gibbs (sociologist) =

American sociologist (1927–2020)

Jack P. Gibbs
- Born: August 26, 1927
- Died: August 20, 2020 (aged 92)
- Education: University of Oregon (Ph.D., 1957)
- Known for: Social control theory, deterrence
- Awards: Guggenheim Fellowship in sociology (1972), Fulbright Scholarship
- Scientific career
- Fields: Sociology, criminology
- Workplaces: Vanderbilt University, University of Texas at Austin
- Thesis: A sociological study of suicide (1957)

Jack Porter Gibbs (August 26, 1927 – August 20, 2020) was an American sociologist known for his work on social control theory and deterrence. In the early 1960s, he and Leonard Broom helped plan the founding of the Population Research Center at the University of Texas at Austin, which was founded in 1963. A 2015 book described Gibbs as "a giant of his time".
