= Bernice A. Pescosolido =

American sociologist

- Born: c. 1952 (age 73–74)
- Education: Yale University; University of Rhode Island
- Known for: Health care services, stigma, and suicide research
- Awards: Selected as the 2020 Distinguished Faculty Research Lecturer for IU Bloomington
- Scientific career
- Fields: Sociology
- Workplaces: Indiana University
- Doctoral advisor: Albert J. Reiss
- Website: www.indiana.edu/~soc/bios/Bernice_Pescosolido.html

Bernice A. Pescosolido (born c. 1952) is an American sociologist, currently a Distinguished Professor of Sociology and Director of the Irsay Institute and Indiana Consortium for Mental Health Services Research at Indiana University, and also a published author. From 1998 to 2006, she was also the Chancellor's Professor of Indiana University. She has also served as vice-president of the American Sociological Association and its Chair of Sociology of Mental Health and Medical Sociology.

Pescosolido was inducted into the National Academy of Medicine in 2016. In 2021, she was elected member of the U. S. National Academy of Sciences.

Pescosolido's research agenda addresses how social networks connect individuals to their communities and to institutional structures, providing the "wires" through which people's attitudes and actions are influenced. This agenda encompasses three basic areas: Health care services, stigma, and suicide research. In the early 1990s, Pescosolido developed the Network-Episode Model, which was designed to focus on how individuals come to recognize and respond to the onset of health problems, and use health care services. Specifically, it has provided new insights to understanding the patterns and pathways to care, adherence to treatment and the outcome of health care. As a result, she has served on advisory agenda-setting efforts at the NIMH, NCI, NHLBI, NIDRR, OBSSR, and presented at congressional briefings.

== Published work ==
Fennell, M. L., & Pescosolido, B. A. (1995). Forty years of medical sociology: The state of the art and directions for the future. Washington, D.C: American Sociological Association.

Pescosolido, B. A., & Aminzade, R. (1999). The social worlds of higher education: Handbook for teaching in a new century. Thousand Oaks, Calif: Pine Forge Press.

B. S., Pescosolido, B. A., & Saks, M. (2000). Complementary and alternative medicine: Challenge and change. Amsterdam: Harwood Academic Publishers.

Levy, J. A., & Pescosolido, B. A. (2002). Social networks and health. Amsterdam: JAI/Elsevier Science Ltd.

Avison, W. R., McLeod, J. D., & Pescosolido, B. A. (2007). Mental health, social mirror. (Springer e-books.) New York: Springer.

Pescosolido, B. A. (2011). Handbook of the sociology of health, illness, and healing: A blueprint for the 21st Century. New York: Springer.

Pilgrim, D., In Pescosolido, B. A., & In Rogers, A. (2011). The SAGE handbook of mental health and illness. Los Angeles: SAGE.

Sewell, A. A., Pescosolido, B. A., Indiana University, Bloomington., & Indiana University, Bloomington,. (2013). Opening the black box of segregation: Structures of racial health disparities. (Dissertation Abstracts International, 75–2.)

Perry, B. L., Pescosolido, B. A., & Borgatti, S. P. (2018). Egocentric network analysis: Foundations, methods, and models.

In Small, M. L., In Perry, B. L., In Pescosolido, B. A., & In Smith, E. B. (2021). Personal networks: Classic readings and new directions in egocentric analysis.
