= Control theory (sociology) =

Sociological concept

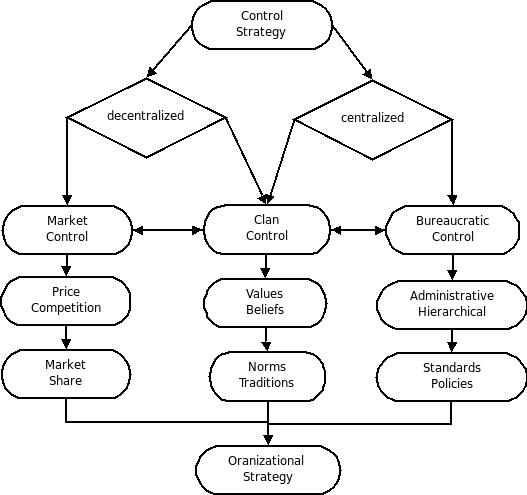
Control theory diagram

Control theory in sociology is the idea that two control systems—inner controls and outer controls—work against our tendencies to deviate. Control theory can either be classified as centralized or decentralized. Decentralized control is considered market control. Centralized control is considered bureaucratic control. Some types of control such as clan control are considered to be a mixture of both decentralized and centralized control.

Decentralized control or market control is typically maintained through factors such as price, competition, or market share. Centralized control such as bureaucratic control is typically maintained through administrative or hierarchical techniques such as creating standards or policies. An example of mixed control is clan control which has characteristics of both centralized and decentralized control. Mixed control or clan control is typically maintained by keeping a set of values and beliefs or norms and traditions.

Containment theory, as developed by Walter Reckless in 1973, states that behavior is caused not by outside stimuli, but by what a person wants most at any given time. According to the control theory, weaker containing social systems result in more deviant behavior.

Control theory stresses how weak bonds between the individuals and society free people to deviate or go against the norms, or the people who have weak ties would engage in crimes so they could benefit, or gain something that is to their own interest. This is where strong bonds make deviance more costly. Deviant acts appear attractive to individuals but social bonds stop most people from committing the acts. Deviance is a result of extensive exposure to certain social situations where individuals develop behaviors that attract them to avoid conforming to social norms. Social bonds are used in control theory to help individuals from pursuing these attractive deviations.

According to Travis Hirschi, humans are selfish beings, who make decisions based on which choice will give the greatest benefit. A good example of control theory would be that people go to work. Most people do not want to go to work, but they do, because they get paid, to obtain food, water, shelter, and clothing.

Hirschi (1969) identifies four elements of social bonds: attachment, commitment, involvement, and belief.

== See also ==
- Social control theory
