= Rubicon model =

Psychological model

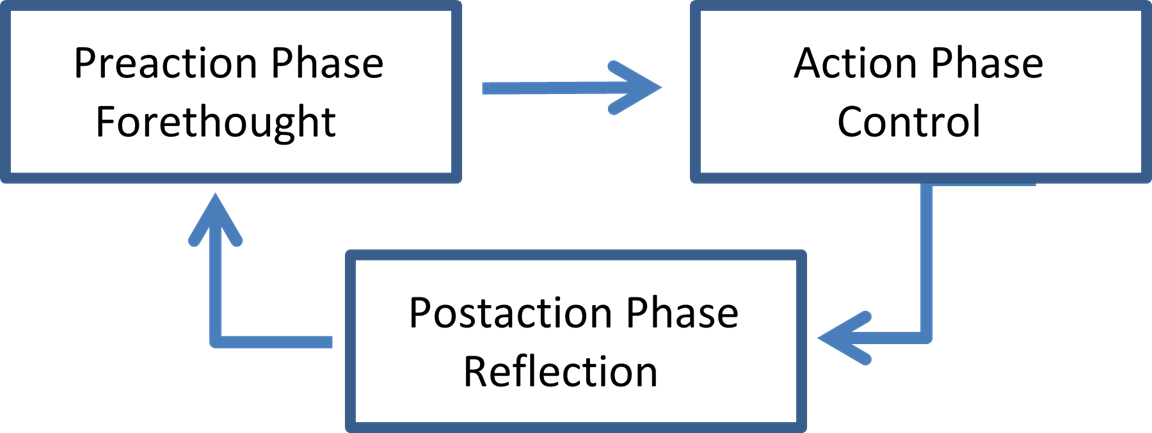
A feedback model of the motivation-volition process. Lower labels are terminology of Zimmerman.

The Rubicon Model was originally proposed by Heckhausen and Gollwitzer in 1987. In psychological theories of motivation and goal-directed behavior, the Rubicon model, more completely the Rubicon model of action phases, makes a distinction between motivational and volitional processes.

The motivational phase encompasses the deliberation of goals, while the volitional phase involves the implementation of decisions. Commitment to a chosen goal precludes further motivational deliberation. The Rubicon model "defines clear boundaries between motivational and action phases." Four action phases comprise a course of action: the pre-decisional phase, the pre-actional phase, the action phase, and the post-actional phase.

The Rubicon model is broadly applied across behavioral science, clinical psychology, health psychology, and organizational psychology.

== Background ==
The Rubicon model addresses the limitation of incomplete understanding of decision-making in earlier theories. Studies prior to the Rubicon model primarily focused on motivational problems, such as how to select the goal, in terms of the expectancy-value models. A research gap exists on formation and implementation of goals. Rubicon model addresses the previously neglected volitional process of putting intents into effects.

Within this context, human action coordinates such aspects of human behavior as perception, thought, emotion, and skills to classify goals as attainable or unattainable and then to engage or disengage in trying to attain these goals. According to Heckhausen & Heckhausen, "Research based on the Rubicon model of action phases has provided a wealth of empirical evidence for mental and behavioral resources being orchestrated in this manner." Engagement and disengagement with goals affects personal distress over the unachievable. "By having new goals available, and reengaging in those new goals, a person can reduce distress..., while continuing to derive a sense of purpose in life by finding other pursuits of value."

The name "Rubicon model" derives from the tale of Caesar's crossing the Rubicon River, a point of no return, thereby revealing his intentions. According to the Rubicon model, every action includes such a point of no return at which the individual moves from goal setting to goal striving.

"Once subjects move from planning and goal-setting to the implementation of plans, they cross a metaphorical Rubicon. That is, their goals are typically protected and fostered by self-regulatory activity rather than reconsidered or changed, often even when challenged."

— Lyn Corno, The best laid plans, p. 15 (quoted by Rauber)

The Rubicon model addresses four questions, as identified by Achtziger and Gollwitzer:

1. How do people select their goals?
2. How do they plan the execution of their goals?
3. How do they enact their plans?
4. How do they evaluate their efforts to accomplish a specific goal?

The study of these issues is undertaken by both the fields of cognitive neuroscience and social psychology. A possible connection between these approaches is brain imaging work attempting to relate volition to neuroanatomy.

== Theoretical Framework ==
The Rubicon model divides the entire process of goal pursuit into 4 consecutive phases. A different proper mindset is involved in each action phase to support required tasks.

=== Pre-decisional Phase ===
Pre-decisional phase is defined by deliberation. People possess motives for achievement. These motives generate multiple wishes. Because more wishes are produced than can be realized, individuals need to accurately reflect their perception of reality for weighing the incentives thoughtfully and estimating likelihood of success and failure correctly.

Conceptually, people should consider their desirability and feasibility of their intents impartially at this stage (deliberative mindset). Based on these considerations, specific wishes are selected as goals. Overall, the pre-decisional phase ends when intention of the goal is formed.

=== Pre-actional Phase (Post-decisional Phase) ===
Pre-actional phase, also named as post-decisional phase, is defined as a phase where individuals plan many strategies for implementing the goal after selecting it. At this stage, people need more than just thorough consideration.

Cognitive resources are devoted to process information relevant to task performance, such as how and when to carry out the goal. People will anticipate any difficulties they will encounter in the implementation. An implemental mindset - partial and optimistic – is associated with this phase of goal pursuit. This phase ends when a chance to act appears and the goal-oriented behavior is officially initiated.

=== Action Phase ===
Action phase is defined as a phase where individuals execute the plan formulated in pre-actional phase. The central feature in this phase is the "mental commitment" of goal, reflecting effort of facing difficulties. The mental commitment is both within and outside the individual's conscious awareness. Achtziger refers to this mindset as the "action mindset".

In addition to human effort, strategic automation maintains the continuous implementation until the goal is successfully realized. The automaticity functions in several ways. Automaticity shields the unwanted thoughts and cues. Goal-directed behaviors can be linked to situational cues, and those responses will be automatically activated. This phase ends when the goal is achieved or when the goal is abandoned.

=== Post-actional Phase ===
Post-actional phase is defined as a phase in which individuals evaluate outcomes of the goal-directed behavior. The evaluation involves comparing the results to the goal set during the pre-decisional phase. If they are satisfied, the goal will be deactivated. When the outcome is satisfactory, the goal will be still deactivated because people adjust to lower standard. When the outcome is unsatisfactory, people will devote more efforts to attain the goal. These are the two variations of evaluative mindset. At this stage, consideration for future behaviors is also involved. People identify the adjustments which can be implemented in the future.

== Empirical Evidence ==
The first boundary "separates the motivational process of the pre-decisional phase from the volitional processes of post-decisional phase." Another boundary is that between initiation and conclusion of an action. A self-regulatory feedback model incorporating these interfaces was proposed later by others, as illustrated in the figure.

=== Gollwitzer & Brandstätter (1997) ===
This study empirically supports the pre-decisional and pre-actional phase in the model. Student participants were asked to complete projects during the Christmas break. Results showed that two-thirds of students who had formed implemental intentions, such as when and where to start, successfully finished the project. In contrast, students who had no implemental intentions mostly failed. These findings indicate that goal intention combined with planning is critically important in both phases.

=== Wrosch et al. (2003) ===
Empirical evidence supports the post-actional phase. Individuals who disengage from the unattainable goal and shift focus to the attainable goal have significantly higher level of subjective well-being. Reengagement reduces the stress level. Evaluative mindset effectively operates when individuals evaluate outcomes and adapt their goal pursuits. Evaluative mindset facilitates self-regulation in the post-actional phase.

== Application ==
=== Educational Psychology ===
The Rubicon model is applied in educational psychology. Dekker's research indicated that students with the implemental intentions perform academically better than those in control condition. Asking students to write down their personal goals and develop the strategy is a form of goal-setting tasks. Students are translated from simply knowing their goals to implemental intentions.

=== Organizational Psychology ===
Implemental intentions cultivate the habituation. These intentions serve as a bridge from conscious planned behavior to automated habitual behavior. Habituated behaviors save cognitive capacities. Individuals can engage more in daily work, proceeding to the goal. Work engagement and goal progress are linked to job satisfaction. Employees burn out less frequently and are more committed to their work.

== Criticism ==
=== Overestimation of the Rubicon model ===
In term of effectiveness, the effect of implemental intention of Rubicon model is overestimated. Meta-analysis proved that large changes in intentions lead to relatively smaller change in behavior. Fundamentally, the effectiveness of the entire model is doubted.

=== Rigid boundaries between phases ===
Boundaries of four action phases in the Rubicon model may be inflexible. Reconsideration of goals often occurs, and the assumption of "a point of no return" between each action phase is refuted. The process of implementing a goal is not purely serial. In addition, the rigid boundaries of each phase are caused by the insufficient evaluation of all the factors affecting the goal. Personal factors interact with the environmental factor. Hence, the Rubicon model is criticized by its focus on individual cognitive processes.

== See also ==
- Cognitive psychology
- Executive functions
- Delayed gratification
- Motivation
- Self-control
- Self-efficacy
- Self-regulated learning
- Self-regulation theory
