= Deviant Behavior (journal) =

- Discipline: Sociology
- Language: English
- Edited by: Craig J. Forsyth

Publication details
- History: 1979–present
- Publisher: Taylor and Francis (United States)
- Frequency: Monthly
- Impact factor: 1.052 (2016)

Standard abbreviations
- ISO 4: Deviant Behav.

Indexing
- ISSN: 0163-9625 (print); 1521-0456 (web)
- OCLC no.: 889408017

Links
- Journal homepage; Online access; Online archive

Deviant Behavior is a peer-reviewed academic journal which focuses on social deviance, including criminal, sexual, and narcotic behaviors. It is published by Routledge and was established in 1979. According to the Journal Citation Reports, the journal has a 2016 impact factor of 1.052, ranking it 48 out of 62 journals in the category "Psychology, Social" and 67 out of 143 journals in the category "Sociology".
