= David Matza =

American sociologist and criminologist (1930–2018)

David Matza (May 1, 1930 – March 14, 2018) was an American sociologist who taught at University of California, Berkeley from 1961.

== Life and work ==
Born in New York, he received his PhD from Princeton University in 1959. His research fields included deviant behavior, social change, poverty and working class life. He is best known for coauthoring, with Gresham Sykes, techniques of neutralization.
