= Gresham Sykes =

American sociologist and criminologist (1922–2010)

Gresham M'Cready Sykes (May 26, 1922 – October 29, 2010) was an American sociologist and criminologist. He earned a Bachelor of Arts at Princeton University and a Ph.D. at Northwestern University. He taught at Princeton, Dartmouth, and Northwestern prior to becoming sociology professor at the University of Virginia. Sykes's study of New Jersey State Prison has been described as a pioneering look at the issues faced by guards, as well as the pains of imprisonment encountered by inmates. His most famous work is The Society of Captives, which is widely considered one of the first works in the genre of prison sociology. He coauthored Techniques of Neutralization: A Theory of Delinquency with David Matza, published in the American Sociological Review in December 1957.
