= Ruth Peterson =

American sociologist and criminologist

- Born: Ruth Delois Peterson
- Education: University of Wisconsin–Madison (PhD, 1983)
- Scientific career
- Fields: Sociology, criminology
- Institutions: Ohio State University
- Thesis: The sanctioning of drug offenders: social change and the social organization of drug law enforcement, 1963-76 (1983)
- Website: sociology.osu.edu/people/peterson.5

Ruth Delois Peterson is an American sociologist and criminologist known for her work on racial and ethnic inequality and crime. She earned her PhD in sociology from University of Wisconsin–Madison in 1983. Peterson is emerita professor of sociology at the Ohio State University, former director of the Criminal Justice Research Center (1999–2011), and former president of the American Society of Criminology (2016). She is the namesake of the American Society of Criminology's Ruth D. Peterson Fellowship for Racial and Ethnic Diversity.

Peterson is the co-organizer of the Racial Democracy, Crime, and Justice Network's Crime and Justice program, an annual Summer Research Institute to support research in criminal justice and crime by underrepresented groups.
