= Robert Crutchfield =

American sociologist

Robert D. Crutchfield
- Born: Robert Douglas Crutchfield
- Education: Thiel College; Vanderbilt University
- Scientific career
- Fields: Sociology
- Institutions: University of Washington
- Thesis: An Examination of the Demographic, Mental Health, and Social Role Correlates of Adult Drug Use (1980)

Robert D. Crutchfield is an American sociologist and professor emeritus of sociology at the University of Washington. He is known for his book Get A Job: Labor Markets, Economic Opportunity, and Crime, which was published in 2014.

== Education ==
Crutchfield received his B.A. from Thiel College and his M.A. and Ph.D. from Vanderbilt University.

== Career ==
Crutchfield is the former vice president of the American Society of Criminology, the former chair of the American Sociological Association's Crime, Law, and Deviance Section, and a former member of the American Sociological Association's committee. He was also a member of the National Research Council's Committee on Law and Justice from 2005 to 2011.

== Honors and awards ==
Crutchfield is a fellow of the American Society of Criminology, and has received the University of Washington’s Distinguished Teaching Award.
