= Social control theory =

Criminological theory

In criminology, social control theory proposes that exploiting the process of socialization and social learning builds self-control and reduces the inclination to indulge in behavior recognized as antisocial. It derived from functionalist theories of crime and was developed by Ivan Nye (1958), who proposed that there were three types of control:

- Direct: by which punishment is threatened or applied for wrongful behavior, and compliance is rewarded by parents, family, and authority figures.
- Indirect: by identification with those who influence behavior, say because their delinquent act might cause pain and disappointment to parents and others with whom they have close relationships.
- Internal: by which a youth refrains from delinquency through the conscience or superego.

== Definition ==
Social control theory proposes that people's relationships, commitments, values, norms, and beliefs encourage them not to break the law. Thus, if moral codes are internalized and individuals are tied into and have a stake in their wider community, they will voluntarily limit their propensity to commit deviant acts. The theory seeks to understand the ways in which it is possible to reduce the likelihood of criminality developing in individuals. It does not consider motivational issues, simply stating that human beings may choose to engage in a wide range of activities, unless the range is limited by the processes of socialization and social learning. The theory derives from a Hobbesian view of human nature as represented in Leviathan, i.e. that all choices are constrained by implicit social contracts, agreements and arrangements among people. Thus, morality is created in the construction of social order, assigning costs and consequences to certain choices and defining some as evil, immoral and/or illegal.

Social control plays a crucial role in providing a more productive and harmonious community. It contributes to the growth of an individual, and the progression of the community. For instance, places with higher crime rates are more likely to be the place where poverty, mobility, and racial/ethnic heterogeneity are most susceptible. The presence of these factors determines the level of social control within a community, particularly when it comes to the placement of infrastructure. A higher level of social control in a community can result to an organized community that can lead to better opportunity in the community.

== Proponents ==
=== Albert J. Reiss ===
Another early form of the theory was proposed by Reiss (1951) who defined delinquency as, "...behavior consequent to the failure of personal and social controls." Personal control was defined as, "...the ability of the individual to refrain from meeting needs in ways which conflict with the norms and rules of the community" while social control was, "...the ability of social groups or institutions to make norms or rules effective." Reiss' version did not specify the sources of such "abilities" nor the specific control mechanisms leading to conformity, but he did assert that the failure of primary groups such as the family to provide reinforcement for non-delinquent roles and values was crucial to the explanation of delinquency. Reiss also wrote extensively on the application of his work to criminology.

=== Jackson Toby ===
Jackson Toby (1957) argued that "the uncommitted adolescent is a candidate for gang socialization." acknowledging "gang socialization" as part of the causal, motivational dynamic leading to delinquency, but introduced the concept of stakes in conformity to explain "candidacy" for such learning experiences. He believed that all could be tempted into delinquency, but most refused because they considered that they had too much to lose. The young who had few stakes or investments in conformity were more likely to be drawn into gang activity. The notion of stakes in conformity fits very well with concepts invoked in later versions of social control theory.

=== F. Ivan Nye ===
Ivan Nye (1958) not only elaborated a social control theory of delinquency, but specified ways to "operationalize" (measure) control mechanisms and related them to self-reports of delinquent behavior. He formulated the theory after interviewing 780 young people in Washington State. The sample was criticized because it did not represent any urban environments, and those selected might have been more apt to describe their families unfavorably. Some were concerned that criminal activity was only mentioned in two of the questions, so the extrapolations to crime in general were considered unsafe. Like Reiss, he focused on the family as a source of control. Moreover, Nye specified three different types of control:

- direct control = punishments and rewards
- indirect control = affectionate identification with non-criminals; and
- internal control = conscience or sense of guilt.

Youth may be directly controlled through constraints imposed by parents, limiting the opportunity for delinquency, as well as through parental rewards and punishments. However, they may be constrained when free from direct control by their anticipation of parental disapproval (indirect control), or through the development of a conscience, an internal constraint on behavior. The focus on the family as a source of control was in marked contrast to the emphasis on economic circumstances as a source of criminogenic motivation at the time. Although he acknowledged motivational forces by stating that, "...some delinquent behavior results from a combination of positive learning and weak and ineffective social control" (1958: 4), he adopted a control-theory position when he proposed that, "...most delinquent behavior is the result of insufficient social control..."

=== Walter Reckless ===
Walter Reckless (1961) developed containment theory by focusing on a youth's self-conception or self-image of being a good person as an insulator against peer pressure to engage in delinquency.

- inner containment = positive sense of self;
- outer containment = supervision and discipline.

This inner containment through self-images is developed within the family and is essentially formed by about the age of twelve. Outer containment was a reflection of strong social relationships with teachers and other sources of conventional socialization within the neighborhood. The basic proposition is there are "pushes" and "pulls" that will produce delinquent behavior unless they are counteracted by containment. The motivations to deviate as pushes are:

- discontent with living conditions and family conflicts;
- aggressiveness and hostility, perhaps due to biological factors; and
- frustration and boredom, say arising from membership of a minority group or through lack of opportunities to advance in school or find employment;

and the pulls are:

- delinquent peers, and
- delinquent subcultures.

=== David Matza ===
An analysis of 'neutralization' was developed by Sykes and Matza (1957) who believed that there was little difference between delinquents and non-delinquents, with delinquents engaging in non-delinquent behavior most of the time. They also asserted that most delinquents eventually opt out of the delinquent lifestyle as they grow older, suggesting that there is a basic code of morality in place but that the young are able to deviate by using techniques of neutralization, i.e. they can temporarily suspend the applicability of norms by developing attitudes "favorable to deviant behavior". The five common techniques were:

- denial of responsibility (I couldn't help myself)
- denial of injury (nobody got hurt)
- denial of victim (they had it coming)
- condemnation of the condemners (what right do they have to criticize me?)
- appeal to higher loyalties (I did it for someone else).

Later Matza (1964) developed his theory of "drift" which proposed that people used neutralization to drift in and out of conventional behaviour, taking a temporary break from moral restraints. Matza based his "drift" theory upon four observations which were:

- Delinquents express guilt over their criminal acts
- Delinquents often respect law-abiding individuals
- A line is drawn between those they can victimize and those they can not
- Delinquents are not immune to the demands of conforming

Although this theory of drift has not been widely supported by empirical tests, it remains a key idea in criminology despite not answering why some conform and others don't.

=== Travis Hirschi ===
Travis Hirschi adopted Toby's concept of an investment in conventionality or "stake in conformity". He stressed the rationality in the decision whether to engage in crime and argued that a person was less likely to choose crime if they had strong social bonds. He defined four bonds that make criminal behavior less likely: attachment (emotional connections to important others, such as peers, family, or teachers), commitment (dedication to society's conventional goals, like education and career), involvement (participating in conventional daily routines, like going to work or school), and belief (accepting society's dominant moral code).

==== The general theory of crime ====
Hirschi moved away from his bonding theory, and in co-operation with Michael R. Gottfredson, developed a general theory or "self-control theory" in 1990. Akers (1991) argued that a major weakness of this new theory was that Gottfredson and Hirschi did not define self-control and the tendency toward criminal behavior separately. By not deliberately operationalizing self-control traits and criminal behavior or criminal acts individually, it suggests that the concepts of low self-control and propensity for criminal behavior are the same. Hirschi and Gottfredson (1993) rebutted Akers argument by suggesting it was actually an indication of the consistency of general theory. That is, the theory is internally consistent by conceptualizing crime and deriving from that a concept of the offender's traits. The research community remains divided on whether the general theory is sustainable but there is emerging confirmation of some of its predictions (e.g. LaGrange & Silverman: 1999)

=== Jack P. Gibbs ===
Gibbs (1989) has redefined social control and applied it to develop a control theory of homicide. Any attempt to get an individual to do or refrain from doing something can be considered an attempt at control. To qualify as 'social' control, such attempts must involve three parties. One or more individuals intends to manipulate the behavior of another by or through a third party. Gibbs' third party can be an actual person or a reference to "society", "expectations" or "norms". For example, if one party attempts to influence another by threatening to refer the matter to a third party assumed to have authority, this is referential social control. If one party attempts to control another by punishing a third (e.g. general deterrence), it is a form of vicarious social control. The presence of the third party distinguishes social control from mere external behavioral control, simple interpersonal responses, or issuing orders for someone to do something. This definition clearly distinguishes social control from mere "reactions to deviance" and from deviant behavior itself.

Gibbs argues that "Homicide can be described either as control or as resulting from control failure" (1989: 35), and proposes that the homicide rate is a function not just of the sheer volume of disputes, but also of the frequency of recourse to a third party for peaceful dispute settlement (p37). When one person fails to control the actions of another through the third party, murder represents another violent attempt at direct control. People resort to self-help when forms of social control are unavailable or fail. Gibbs is critical of Hirschi's Social Control Theory because it merely assumes that social relationships, personal investments and beliefs that discourage delinquency are social controls (which is one reason why Hirschi's theory is often referred to as a Social Bond Theory).

== Criticism ==
Much of the early research on social control theory is based on self-reporting studies. Critics of self-report data note that there may be various motives for disclosing information, and that questions may be interpreted differently by individual participants. Nevertheless, many of the conclusions are intuitively convincing, e.g. that individuals will not engage in crime if they think that this will sacrifice the affection or respect of significant others, or cause them to lose employment or their autonomy if they face imprisonment. Davies (1994 and 2004), reports that in late-nineteenth century Britain, crime rates fell dramatically, as did drug and alcohol abuse, and illegitimacy became less common. All of these indexes of deviance were fairly steady between World War I and 1955. After 1955, they all rose to create a U-curve of deviance, over the period from 1847 to 1997. He attributes the initial shift to adoption of a culture in which the assumptions of Protestant Christianity were taken for granted. Everyone at the time believed—at least somewhat—in a moral code of helping others. This belief was rooted in religion. The same social norms for the defense of the person and property that informed the law before 1955 remain the policy norms. Furthermore, the concept that people are uncontrollable and may offend against those norms in social interactions, cannot be explained by simply counting how many people practice the Golden Rule (see the general discussion in Braithwaite: 1989.)

== See also ==
- Guilt society
- Power (social and political)
- Shame society
- Control theory (sociology)

== Sources ==
- Hirschi, T. (2002). Causes of delinquency. New Brunswick, N.J.: Transaction Publishers.
