= Walter Reckless =

American criminologist (1899–1988)

- Born: Walter Cade Reckless; January 19, 1899; Philadelphia, Pennsylvania, U.S.
- Died: September 20, 1988 (aged 89); Dublin, Ohio, U.S.
- Education: University of Chicago (PhD)
- Occupation: Criminologist
- Known for: Containment theory

Walter Cade Reckless (January 19, 1899 – September 20, 1988) was an American criminologist known for his containment theory (in social control theory), who was born in Philadelphia, Pennsylvania and died in Dublin, Ohio.

== Biography ==
Reckless earned his PhD in sociology (1925) from the University of Chicago. While at the Chicago school, he joined with sociologists Robert Park and Ernest Burgess in conducting observation studies of crime in Chicago, Illinois. This research led to his dissertation, The Natural History of Vice Areas in Chicago (1925), which was published as "Vice in Chicago" (1933), a landmark sociological study of fraud, prostitution, and organized crime in the city's "vice" districts.

As a professor of sociology at Vanderbilt University (1925–1940), Reckless shifted his focus to the study of juvenile delinquency. In their 1932 book Juvenile Delinquency, he and Mapheus Smith (professor at the University of Kansas) focused on juvenile offenders; the book included court dispositions as well as physical and social characteristics of the delinquents (i.e., physical and mental traits, social backgrounds, and school maladjustments).

As a professor (of social administration and, later, of criminology) at the Ohio State University (1940–1969) he published his "containment theory" on delinquency and crime (Reckless, Dinitz, & Murray, 1956; Reckless, 1961). Building on the early work of Albert J. Reiss (1951), Reckless' theory posits that social control – which constrains deviance, delinquency, and crime – included 'inner' (i.e., strong conscience or a "good self-concept") and 'outer' forces of containment (i.e., supervision and discipline by parents and the school, strong group cohesion, and a consistent moral front).

In 1963, the American Society of Criminology awarded him the Edwin H. Sutherland Award for outstanding contributions to theory or research in criminology on the etiology of criminal and deviant behavior, the criminal justice system, corrections, law, or justice. He served as the President of the American Society of Criminology from 1964 through 1966.
