= Michael R. Gottfredson =

American academic administrator (born 1951)

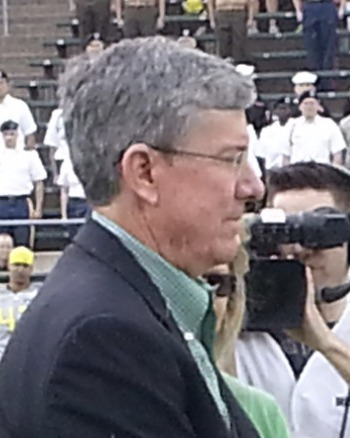

17th President of the University of Oregon
- In office 2012–2014
- Preceded by: Richard W. Lariviere
- Succeeded by: Michael H. Schill

Personal details
- Born: Michael Ryan Gottfredson; January 16, 1951 (age 75)
- Spouse: Karol Gottfredson
- Education: University of California, Davis (BA); State University of New York, Albany (MA, PhD)
- Profession: Administrator
- Website: Office of the President

Michael Ryan Gottfredson (born January 16, 1951) is the former President of the University of Oregon, serving from August 1, 2012 to August 6, 2014.

== Biography ==
He has a B.A from the University of California, Davis, a M.A. and a Ph.D. from the State University of New York at Albany.

He previously served as provost and executive vice-chancellor of University of California, Irvine.

On June 11, 2012, it was announced that he was the sole finalist for the position of president at the University of Oregon. He was confirmed by the Oregon State Board of Higher Education on June 15, 2012, with the decision to take effect on August 1, 2012.

As the President of the University of Oregon, Gottfredson was a member of the Board of Trustees of the University of Oregon. On August 6, 2014, Gottfredson announced, via a campus-wide email, his decision to depart the University of Oregon to pursue other scholarly interests and spend more time with family. The UO Board of Trustees formally accepted Gottfredson's resignation and appointed Scott Coltrane as interim president the following day.

As of late 2014, Gottfredson is a research professor of Criminology, Law & Society at University of California, Irvine. He held various positions at the University of Arizona from 1985 to 2000, and has been before associate professor at The Claremont Graduate School, Claremont, California (1983-1985), associate professor of Sociology, University of Illinois, Urbana from (1981-1983), assistant professor at the Graduate School of Criminal Justice, State University of New York at Albany (1977-1979) and director of the Criminal Justice Research Center in Albany, New York (1976-1979).

== Self-control theory of crime ==
The theory was developed by Travis Hirschi and Gottfredson. The criminological theory proposes that lack of individual self-control is the main factor behind criminal behavior.

Academic offices
Preceded by Robert M. Berdahl (Interim); Richard W. Lariviere	17th President of the University of Oregon; 2012 – 2014	Succeeded by Scott Coltrane (Interim); Michael H. Schill
