= Travis Hirschi =

American sociologist and criminologist (1935–2017)

- Born: April 15, 1935; Rockville, Utah, U.S.
- Died: January 2, 2017 (aged 81); Tucson, Arizona, U.S.
- Education: University of California, Berkeley (Ph.D.)
- Known for: Social control theory
- Scientific career
- Fields: Sociology, criminology

Travis Warner Hirschi (April 15, 1935 – January 2, 2017) was an American sociologist and an emeritus professor of sociology at the University of Arizona. He helped to develop the modern version of the social control theory of crime and later the self-control theory of crime.

== Biography ==
Hirschi was born in Rockville, Utah. He attended the University of Utah in the 1950s, where he obtained undergraduate and master's degrees. In 1955, Hirschi married Anna Yergensen. He spent two years as a U.S. Army data analyst. He received a Ph.D. in sociology from the University of California, Berkeley in 1968.

In his 1969 work Causes of Delinquency, Hirschi posited his version of social control theory. Hirschi argued that social bonds encouraged conforming behavior and prevented most people from committing crimes. In 1977, he and Michael Hindelang published a study which showed that IQ and social class were equally predictive of crime; IQ had been previously discounted as a correlate of criminal behavior. A 1983 paper in the American Journal of Sociology by Hirschi and Michael R. Gottfredson showed that younger age was associated with increased criminal activity independent of any other known factor. In 1990, Hirschi and Gottfredson wrote that lack of self-control, which was tied to parenting issues, was the cause of crime.

Hirschi held faculty appointments at the University of Washington, the University of California, Davis, SUNY Albany and the University of Arizona. He was a fellow and past president of the American Society of Criminology. The organization also honored him with its highest distinction, the Edwin H. Sutherland Award. In 2016 Hirschi won the Stockholm Prize in Criminology. He died in January 2017 at the age of 81.
