= Corruption =

Dishonest or fraudulent conduct by those in power

Map of the Corruption Perceptions Index, 2025, as scored by Transparency international. A higher score indicates greater transparency (i.e., less corruption). The score ranges are: Less corrupt 90–100 80–89 70–79 60–69 50–59 / More corrupt 40–49 30–39 20–29 10–19 0–9 No data

Corruption is a form of dishonesty or a crime that is undertaken by a person or an organization that is entrusted in a position of authority to acquire illicit benefits or abuse power for one's gain. Corruption may involve activities like bribery, influence peddling, embezzlement, and fraud as well as practices that are legal in many countries, such as lobbying. Political corruption occurs when an office-holder or other governmental employee acts in an official capacity for personal gain.

Historically, "corruption" had a broader meaning concerned with an activity's impact on morals and societal well-being: for example, the ancient Greek philosopher, Socrates was condemned to death in part for "corrupting the young".

Contemporary corruption is perceived as most common in kleptocracies, oligarchies, narco-states, authoritarian states, and mafia states, however, research and policy statements acknowledge that it also exists in wealthy capitalist economies. In How Corrupt is Britain, David Whyte reveals that corruption exists "across a wide range of venerated institutions" in the UK, ranked as one of the least corrupt countries by the Corruption Perceptions Index (CPI). In a 2022 speech on "Modern Corruption", USAID Administrator Samantha Power stated: "Corruption is no longer just about individual autocrats pilfering their nation's wealth to live large", but also involves sophisticated transnational networks, including financial institutions hidden in secrecy. Responding to Whyte's book, George Monbiot criticized the CPI for its narrow definition of corruption that surveys mostly only executives about bribery. Similarly, others point out that "global metrics systematically under-measure 'corruption of the rich' – which tends to be legalized, institutionalized, and ambiguously unethical – as opposed to 'corruption of the poor'".

Corruption and crime are endemic sociological phenomena that occur regularly in nearly all countries worldwide, in varying degrees and proportions. Recent data suggests corruption is on the rise. Each nation allocates domestic resources for the control and regulation of corruption and the deterrence of crime. Strategies undertaken to counter corruption are often summarized under the umbrella term anti-corruption. Additionally, global initiatives like the United Nations Sustainable Development Goals 16 also have a targeted goal which is supposed to reduce corruption in all of its forms substantially. Recent initiatives like the Tax Justice Network go beyond bribery and theft and bring attention to tax abuses.

== Definitions and scales ==
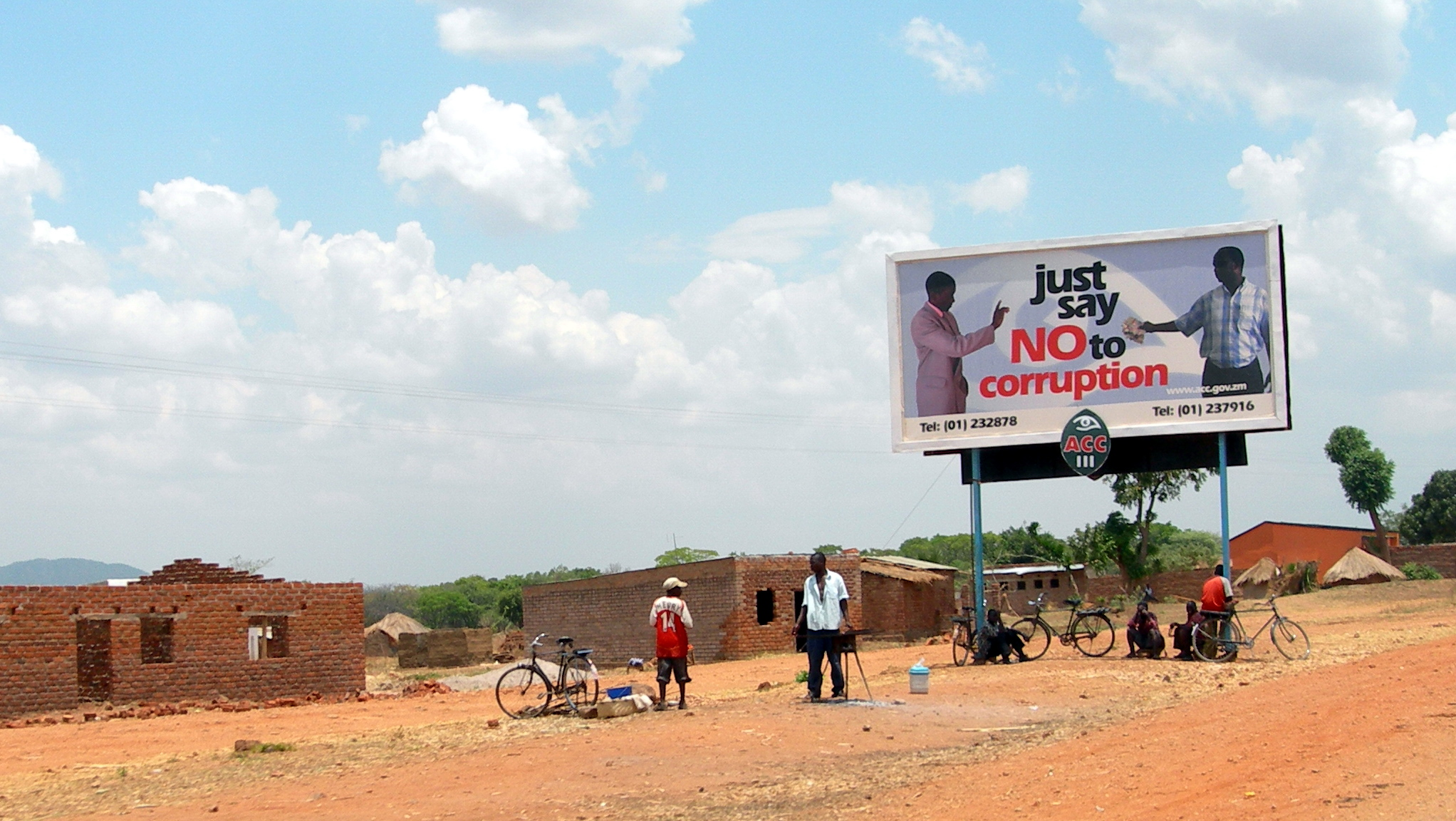
A billboard in Zambia exhorting the public to "Just say no to corruption"

Stephen D. Morris, a professor of politics, wrote that political corruption is the illegitimate use of public power to benefit a private interest. Economist Ian Senior defined corruption as an action to secretly provide a good or a service to a third party to influence certain actions which benefit the corrupt, a third party, or both in which the corrupt agent has authority. World Bank economist Daniel Kaufmann extended the concept to include "legal corruption" in which power is abused within the confines of the law—as those with power often have the ability to make laws for their protection. The effect of corruption in infrastructure is to increase costs and construction time, lower the quality and decrease the benefit.

Corruption is a complex phenomenon and can occur on different scales. Corruption ranges from small favors between a small number of people (petty corruption), to corruption that affects the government on a large scale (grand corruption), and corruption that is so prevalent that it is part of the everyday structure of society, including corruption as one of the symptoms of organized crime (systemic corruption). "Corruption of the rich" is particularly hard to measure and largely excluded from conventional metrics like the CPI.

A number of indicators and tools have been developed which can measure different forms of corruption with increasing accuracy; but when those are impractical, one study suggests looking at bodyfat as a rough guide after finding that obesity of cabinet ministers in post-Soviet states was highly correlated with more accurate measures of corruption.

=== Petty theft, grand theft, speed money, access money ===
Political economist Yuen Yuen Ang "unbundles corruption" into four types, encompassing both petty and grand corruption as well as legal and illegal versions: petty theft, grand theft, speed money, access money. According to her definition, speed money "means petty bribes that businesses or citizens pay to bureaucrats to get around hurdles or speed things up." This is the kind of corruption associated with the "efficient grease hypothesis," which economists found burdensome to businesses in practice. Ang defines access money as "high-stakes rewards extended by business actors to powerful officials, not just for speed, but to access exclusive, valuable privileges." Most theories about bribery focus on speed money, but neglects access money. "From a businessperson's point of view, access money is less a tax than an investment... making it more sludge than grease." The Unbundled Corruption Index measures the prevalence of these four types of corruption.

Whereas corruption with theft and speed money is endemic in poor countries, access money can be found in both poor and rich countries.

=== Petty corruption ===
Petty corruption occurs at a smaller scale and takes place at the implementation end of public services when public officials meet the public. For example, in many small places such as registration offices, police stations, state licensing boards, and many other private and government sectors.

=== Grand corruption ===
Grand corruption is defined as corruption occurring at the highest levels of government in a way that requires significant subversion of the political, legal and economic systems. Such corruption is commonly found in countries with authoritarian or dictatorial governments but also in those without adequate policing of corruption.

The government system in many countries is divided into the legislative, executive and judicial branches in an attempt to provide independent services that are less subject to grand corruption due to their independence from one another.

=== Systemic corruption ===
Systemic corruption (or endemic corruption) is corruption that is primarily due to the weaknesses of an organization or process. It can be contrasted with individual officials or agents who act corruptly within the system.

Factors which encourage systemic corruption include conflicting incentives, discretionary powers; monopolistic powers; lack of transparency; low pay; and a culture of impunity. Specific acts of corruption include "bribery, extortion, and embezzlement" in a system where "corruption becomes the rule rather than the exception." Scholars distinguish between centralized and decentralized systemic corruption, depending on which level of state or government corruption takes place; in countries such as the post-Soviet states both types occur. Corruption has been a major issue in China, where society depends heavily on personal relationships. By the late 20th century that combined with the new lust for wealth, produced escalating corruption. Historian Keith Schoppa says that bribery was only one of the tools of Chinese corruption, which also included, "embezzlement, nepotism, smuggling, extortion, cronyism, kickbacks, deception, fraud, squandering of public money, illegal business transactions, stock manipulation and real estate fraud." Given the repeated anti-corruption campaigns it was a prudent precaution to move as much of the fraudulent money as possible overseas.

In countries like the United States, there is a relatively strong sense of trust among strangers. In Latin American countries this trust tends to be decreased. Acquaintances are treated with trust and respect—a level of trust that is not found among acquaintances in countries like the United States. This is what permits for corruption in some Latin American countries. If there is a strong enough trust within an administration that no one will betray the rest, corruptive policies can take place with ease.

=== State-business collusion ===
While not necessarily involving bribery, recent research documents the emergence of "a particular kind of large, non-state business group" that is akin to a mafia system in China. In this situation, the boundary between public and private actors blurs.

== Causes ==
Per R. Klitgaard corruption will occur if the corrupt gain is greater than the punitive damages multiplied by the likelihood of being caught and prosecuted.

Since a high degree of monopoly and discretion accompanied by a low degree of transparency does not automatically lead to corruption, a fourth variable of "morality" or "integrity" has been introduced by others. The moral dimension has an intrinsic component and refers to a "mentality problem", and an extrinsic component referring to circumstances like poverty, inadequate remuneration, inappropriate work conditions and inoperable or over-complicated procedures which demoralize people and let them search for "alternative" solutions.

According to a 2017 survey study, the following factors have been attributed as causes of corruption:

- Higher levels of market and political monopolization
- Low levels of democracy, weak civil participation and low political transparency
- Higher levels of bureaucracy and inefficient administrative structures
- Low press freedom
- Low economic freedom
- Large ethnic divisions and high levels of in-group favoritism
- Gender inequality
- Poverty
- Political instability
- Weak property rights
- Contagion from corrupt neighboring countries
- Low levels of education
- Lack of commitment to society
- Unemployment
- Lack of proper policies against corruption

It has been noted that in a comparison of the most corrupt with the least corrupt countries, the former group contains nations with huge socio-economic inequalities, and the latter contains nations with a high degree of social and economic justice. While petty, grand, and systemic corruption, described above, are largely found in poor countries with weak institutions, a newer literature has turned to money politics in wealthy democracies and extreme global inequalities. Simon Weschle at Syracuse University examines the prevalence of campaign finance and its consequences for democracy. Kristin Surak at the London School of Economics explores the controversial practice of millionaires buying "golden passports" with no intention of actually migrating. In her words, "a full-blown citizenship industry that thrives on global inequalities" has arisen." Much of existing literature focuses on explicit corrupt actions like bribery and embezzlement, endemic in poor countries (see below). For "money in politics," the causes are very different and largely ignored in conventional literature. For example, the UK is a developed economy with a robust democracy, and yet London is a hub for money laundering. In a critique of the failures and politics leading up to the US financial crisis, a Stanford financial economist noted, "In the real world, it turned out, important economic outcomes are often the consequences of political forces. During 2010, people within regulatory bodies told me privately that false and misleading claims were affecting key policy decisions... I saw confusion, willful blindness, political forces, various and sometimes subtle forms of corruption, and moral disengagement, first hand."

Social norms have been posited as an explanation for why some environments are corrupt and others are not.

Contemporary corruption in Africa has been linked by a book to the historical systematic use of material incentives by colonisers to compel local African rulers to collaborate. For all developing countries, the degree of European settlement in the colonial era correlates with levels of contemporary corruption.

Within less democratic countries, the presence of resources such as diamonds, gold, oil, and forestry and other extractable resources tends to increase the prevalence of corruption, also called the resource curse. The presence of fuel extraction and export is unambiguously associated with corruption, whereas mineral exports only increased corruption in poorer countries. In wealthier countries, mineral exports such as gold and diamonds are actually associated with reduced corruption.

While democratization in countries with below average democracy levels was found correlated with some increase in corruption, in countries with above average democracy indices further democratization tends to reduce corruption. A study found the increase in corruption at low democracy levels associated with unfair elections and limited freedom of speech and freedom of association.

== By sector ==
Corruption can occur in many sectors, whether they be public or private industry or even NGOs (especially in public sector). However, only in democratically controlled institutions is there an interest of the public (owner) to develop internal mechanisms to fight active or passive corruption, whereas in private industry as well as in NGOs there is no public control. Therefore, the owners' investors' or sponsors' profits are largely decisive.

=== Public sector ===
Public corruption includes corruption of the political process and of government agencies such as tax collectors and the police, as well as corruption in processes of allocating public funds for contracts, grants, and hiring. Recent research by the World Bank suggests that who makes policy decisions (elected officials or bureaucrats) can be critical in determining the level of corruption because of the incentives different policy-makers face.

==== Political ====
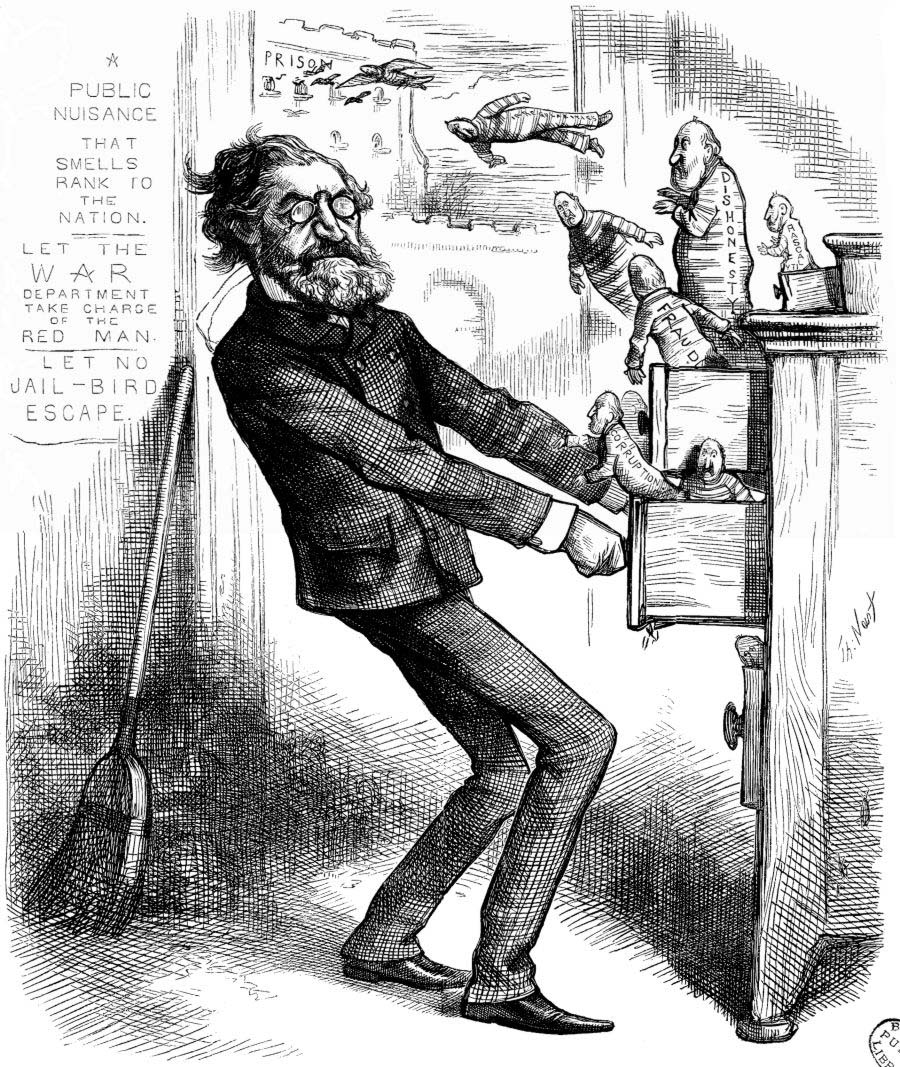
A political cartoon from Harper's Weekly, 26 January 1878, depicting U.S. Secretary of the Interior Carl Schurz investigating the Indian Bureau at the U.S. Department of the Interior. The original caption for the cartoon is: "THE SECRETARY OF THE INTERIOR INVESTIGATING THE INDIAN BUREAU. GIVE HIM HIS DUE, AND GIVE THEM THEIR DUES."

Political corruption is the abuse of public power, office, or resources by elected government officials for personal gain, by extortion, soliciting or offering bribes. It can also take the form of office holders maintaining themselves in office by purchasing votes by enacting laws which use taxpayers' money. Evidence suggests that corruption can have political consequences – with citizens being asked for bribes becoming less likely to identify with their country or region.

The political act of "graft" (American English), is a well known and now global form of political corruption, being the unscrupulous and illegal use of a politician's authority for personal gain, when funds intended for public projects are intentionally misdirected in order to maximize the benefits to illegally private interests of the corrupted individual(s) and their cronies. In some cases government institutions are "repurposed" or shifted away from their official mandate to serve other, often corrupt purposes.

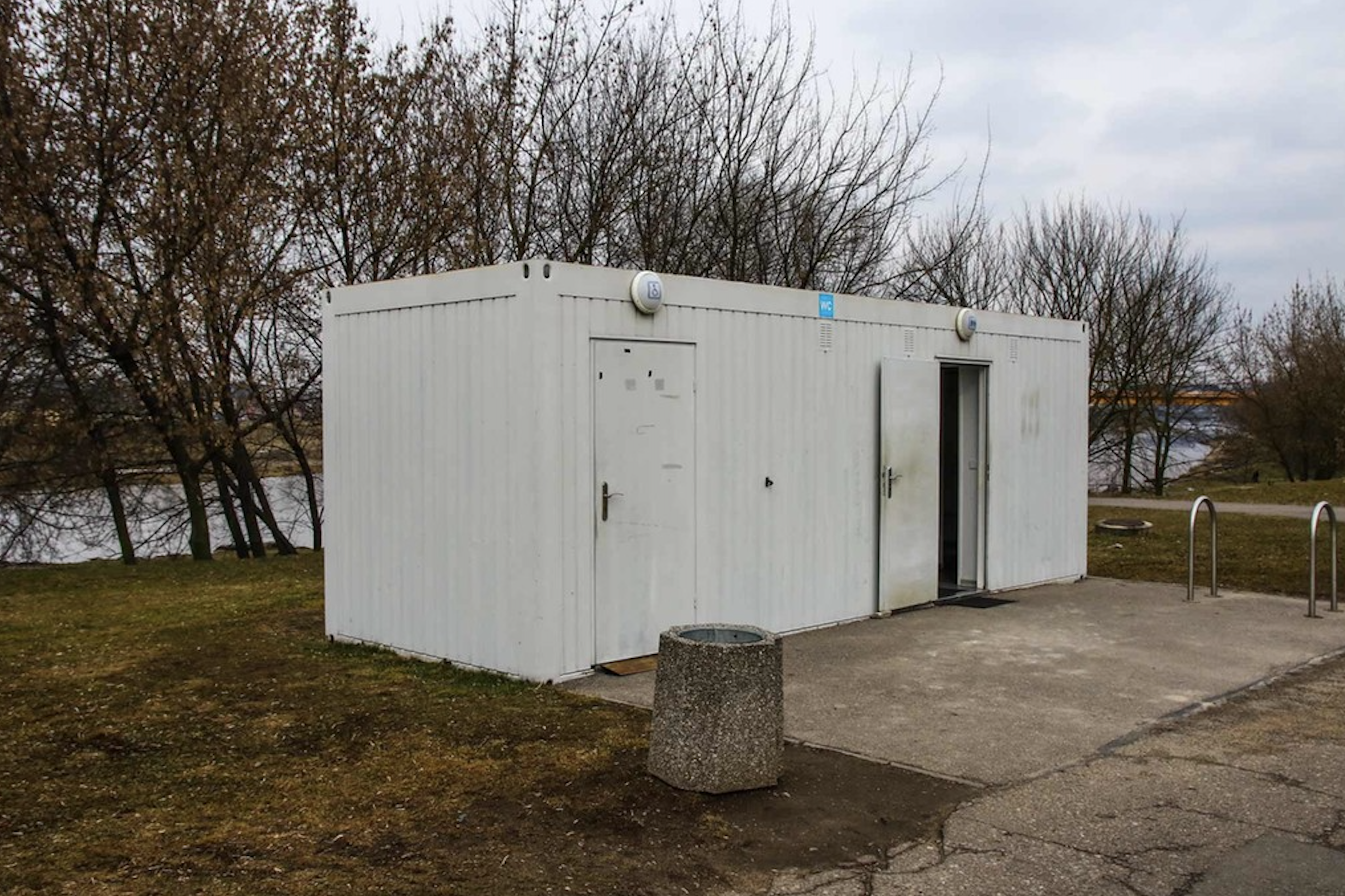
The Kaunas "Golden Toilet"

The Kaunas golden toilet case was a major Lithuanian scandal. In 2009, the municipality of Kaunas (led by mayor Andrius Kupčinskas) ordered that a shipping container was to be converted into an outdoor toilet at a cost of 500,000 litai (around 150,000 euros). It was to also require 5,000 litai (1,500 euros) in monthly maintenance costs. At the same time when Kaunas's "Golden Toilet" was built, Kėdainiai tennis club acquired a very similar, but more advanced solution for 4,500 euros. Because of the inflated cost of the outdoor toilet, it was nicknamed the "Golden Toilet". Despite the investment, the "Golden Toilet" remained closed for years due to the dysfunctionality and was a subject of a lengthy anti-corruption investigation into those who had created it and the local municipality even considered demolishing the building at one point. The group of public servants involved in the toilet's procurement received various prison sentences for recklessness, malfeasance, misuse of power and document falsifications in a 2012 court case, but were cleared of their corruption charges and received compensation, which pushed the total construction cost and subsequent related financial losses to 352,000 euros.

On 7 July 2020, the Carnegie Endowment for International Peace, a global think tank, released a report claiming the Emirati city, Dubai, of being an enabler of global corruption, crime and illicit financial flows. It stated that the global corrupt and criminal actors either operated through or from Dubai. The city was also called a haven for trade-based money laundering, as it gives space to free trade zones, with minimal regulatory laws and customs enforcement.

A report in September 2022 revealed that British Members of Parliament received a total of £828,211 over a period of eight years from countries of the Saudi-led coalition in the Yemeni Civil War. The money was granted in the form of all-expenses-paid trips to 96 MPs by Saudi Arabia (at least £319,406), Bahrain (£197,985), the United Arab Emirates (£187,251), Egypt (£66,695) and Kuwait (£56,872). MPs also received gifts, including a £500 food hamper, tickets for a Burns Supper, an expensive watch and a day out at the Royal Windsor Horse Show. The Saudi-led coalition was accused of attempting to buy influence in the UK. While the MPs registered the trips and gifts at Westminster as per the rules, critics called it "absolutely shameful" to accept donations from countries with poor human rights records.

The British Monarchy has been accused of corruption in cases involving influence peddling and cash-for-Honours scandals.

Similar cases involving Saudi Arabia revolved around access and honours for donors to King Charles Mountbatten-Windsor’s charities.

In 2022, four people were arrested for corruption in the European Parliament. This came to be known as the Qatar corruption scandal at the European Parliament. European Commission President Ursula von der Leyen said the allegations were "very serious" and called for the creation of a new ethics body to oversee the European Union.

==== Judicial ====
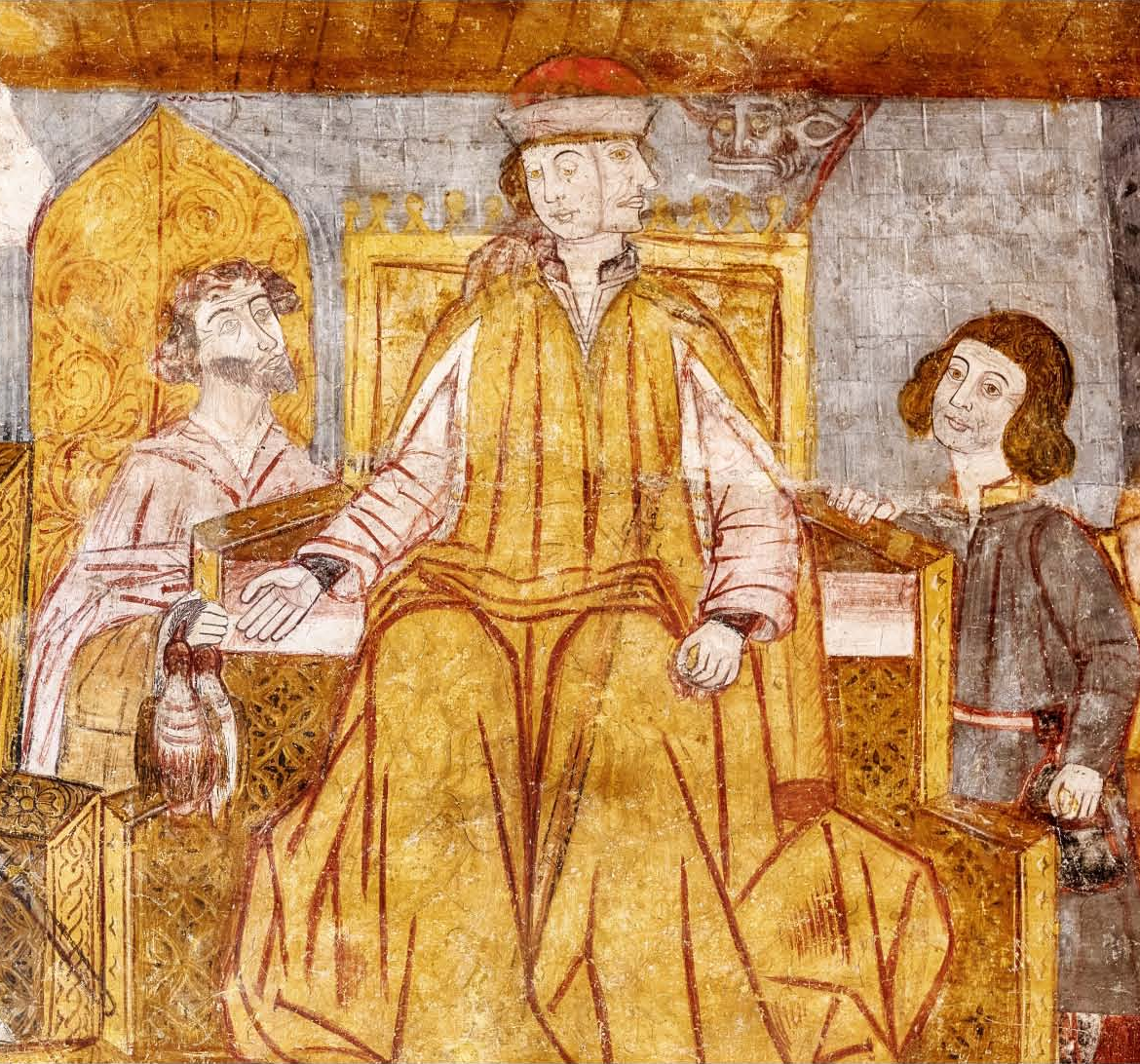
In the Renaissance fresco The Good and the Bad Judge (Monsaraz, Portugal), the Bad Judge, depicted as having two faces, is shown taking bribes: the nobleman to the right offers him gold coins from a purse, and the villein to the left gives him a pair of partridges.

Judicial corruption refers to the corruption-related misconduct of judges, through the receiving or giving of bribes, the improper sentencing of convicted criminals, judicial activism, bias in the hearing and judgement of arguments and other forms of misconduct. Judicial corruption can also be conducted by prosecutors and defense attorneys. An example of prosecutorial misconduct, occurs when a politician or a crime boss bribes a prosecutor to open investigations and file charges against an opposing politician or a rival crime boss, in order to hurt the competition.

Governmental corruption of the judiciary is broadly known in many transitional and developing countries because the budget is almost completely controlled by the executive. The latter critically undermines the separation of powers, because it fosters financial dependence on the judiciary. The proper distribution of a nation's wealth, including its government's spending on the judiciary, is subject to constitutional economics.

The judiciary may be corrupted by acts of the government, such as through budget planning and various privileges, and by private acts. Corruption in judiciary may also involve the government using its judicial arm to oppress opposition parties. Judicial corruption is difficult to completely eradicate, even in developed countries.

==== Military ====
Military corruption refers to the abuse of power by members in the armed forces, in order for career advancement or for personal gain by a soldier or soldiers. One form of military corruption in the United States Armed Forces is a military soldier being promoted in rank or being given better treatment than their colleagues by their officers due to their race, sexual orientation, ethnicity, gender, religious beliefs, social class or personal relationships with higher-ranking officers in spite of their merit. In addition to that, the US military has also had many instances of officers sexually assaulting fellow officers and in many cases, there were allegations that many of the attacks were covered up and victims were coerced to remain silent by officers of the same rank or of higher rank.

Another example of military corruption is a military officer or officers using the power of their positions to commit activities that are illegal, such as skimming logistical supplies such as food, medicine, fuel, body armor or weapons to sell on the local black market. There have also been instances of military officials, providing equipment and combat support to criminal syndicates, private military companies and terrorist groups, without approval from their superiors. As a result, many countries have a military police force to ensure that the military officers follow the laws and conduct of their respective countries but sometimes the military police have levels of corruption themselves.

==== Natural resources ====
Corruption includes industrial corruption, consisting of large bribes, as well as petty corruption such as a poacher paying off a park ranger to ignore poaching. The international Extractive Industries Transparency Initiative seeks to create best practices for good governance of gas, oil, and minerals, particularly focusing on the state management of revenue from these resources. Any valued natural resource can be affected by corruption, including water for irrigation, land for livestock grazing, forests for hunting and logging, and fisheries.

The presence or perception of corruption also undermines environmental initiatives. In Kenya, farmers blame poor agricultural productivity on corruption, and thus are less likely to undertake soil conservation measures to prevent soil erosion and loss of nutrients. In Benin, mistrust of government due to perceived corruption led small farmers to reject the adaptation of measures to combat climate change.

==== Police ====
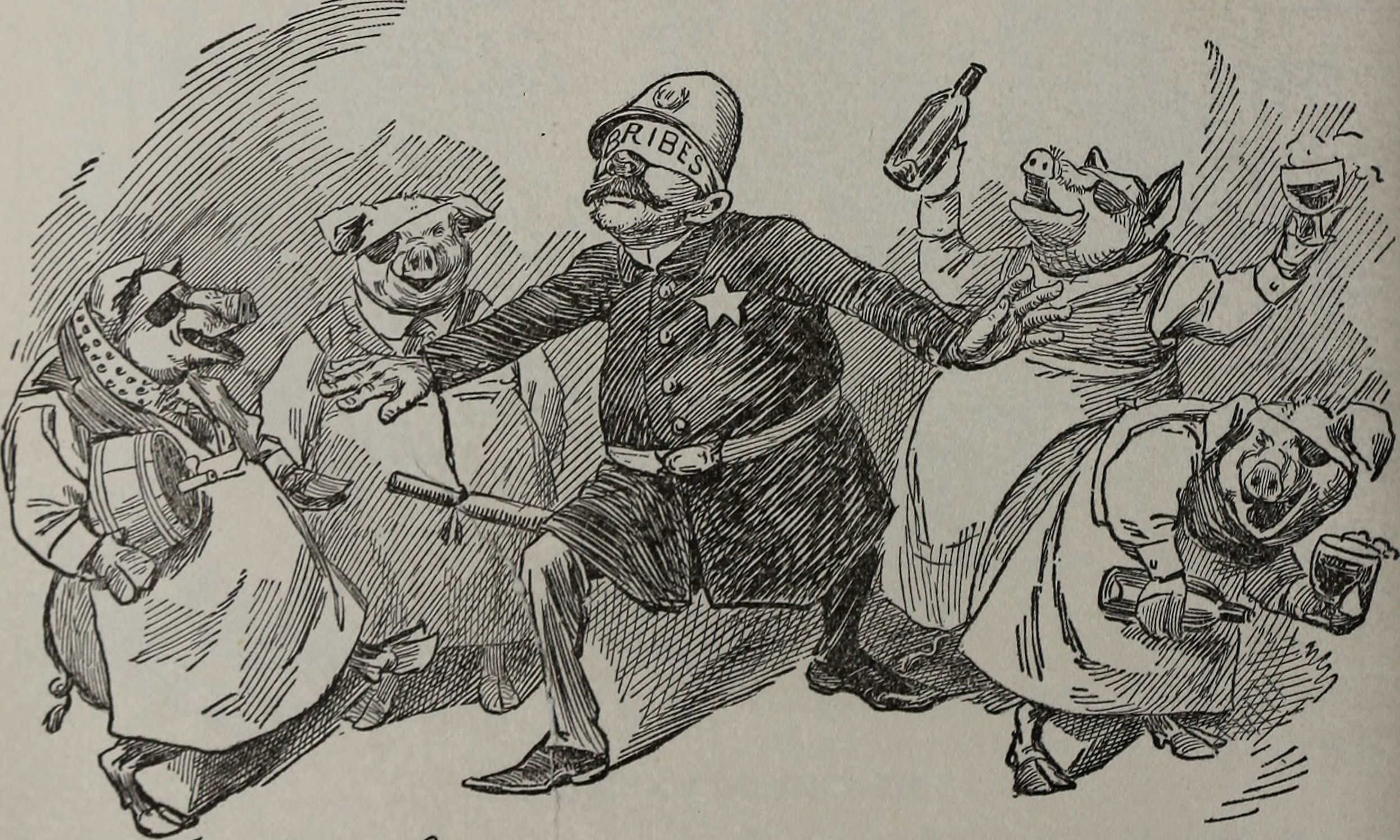
A 1902 cartoon depicts a police officer whose eyes are covered with a cloth labelled "bribes".

Police corruption is a specific form of police misconduct designed to obtain financial benefits, personal gain, career advancement for a police officer or officers in exchange for not pursuing or selectively pursuing an investigation or arrest or aspects of the "thin blue line" itself where force members collude in lies to protect their precincts, unions and/or other law enforcement members from accountability. One common form of police corruption is soliciting or accepting bribes in exchange for not reporting organized drug or prostitution rings or other illegal activities. When civilians become witnesses to police brutality, officers are often known to respond by harassing and intimidating the witnesses as retribution for reporting the misconduct. Whistleblowing is not common in law enforcement in part because officers who do so normally face reprisal by being fired, being forced to transfer to another department, being demoted, being shunned, losing friends, not being given back-up during emergencies, receiving professional or even physical threats as well as having threats be made against friends or relatives of theirs or having their own misconduct exposed. In America another common form of police corruption is when white supremacist groups, such as Neo-Nazi Skinheads or Neo-Confederates (such as the Ku Klux Klan), recruit members of law enforcement into their ranks or encourage their members to join local police departments to repress minorities and covertly promote white supremacy.

Another example is police officers flouting the police code of conduct in order to secure convictions of suspects—for example, through the use of surveillance abuse, false confessions, police perjury and/or falsified evidence. Police officers have also been known to sell forms of contraband that were taken during seizures (such as confiscated drugs, stolen property or weapons). Corruption and misconduct can also be done by prison officers, such as the smuggling of contraband (such as drugs or electronics) into jails and prisons for inmates or the abuse of prisoners. Another form of misconduct is probation officers taking bribes in exchange for allowing parolees to violate the terms of their probation or abusing their paroles. More rarely, police officers may deliberately and systematically participate in organized crime themselves, either while on the job or during off hours. In most major cities, there are internal affairs sections to investigate suspected police corruption or misconduct. Similar entities include the British Independent Police Complaints Commission.

=== Private sector ===
Private sector corruption occurs when any institution, entity or person that is not controlled by the public sector company, household and institution that is not controlled by the public sector engages in corrupt acts. Private sector corruption may overlap with public sector corruption, for example when a private entity operates in conjunction with corrupt government officials, or where the government involves itself in activity normally performed by private entities.

==== Legal ====
Corruption facilitated by lawyers is a well known form of judicial misconduct. Such abuse is called Attorney misconduct. Attorney misconduct can be either conducted by individuals acting on their own accord or by entire law firms. A well known example of such corruption are mob lawyers. Mob lawyers are attorneys who seek to protect the leaders of criminal enterprises as well as their criminal organizations, with the use of unethical and/or illegal conduct such as making false or misleading statements, hiding evidence from prosecutors, failing to disclose all relevant facts about the case, or even giving clients advice on how to commit crimes in ways that would make prosecution more difficult for any investigating authorities.

==== Corporate ====
In criminology, corporate crime refers to crimes committed either by a corporation (i.e., a business entity having a separate legal personality from the natural persons that manage its activities), or by individuals acting on behalf of a corporation or other business entity (see vicarious liability and corporate liability). Some negative behaviours by corporations may not be criminal; laws vary between jurisdictions. For example, some jurisdictions allow insider trading.

==== Education ====
Corruption in education is a worldwide phenomenon. Corruption in admissions to universities is traditionally considered one of the most corrupt areas of the education sector. Recent attempts in some countries, such as Russia and Ukraine, to curb corruption in admissions through the abolition of university entrance examinations and introduction of standardized computer-graded tests have met backlash from part of society, while others appreciate the changes. Vouchers for university entrants have never materialized. The cost of corruption is that it impedes sustainable economic growth.

Endemic corruption in educational institutions leads to the formation of sustainable corrupt hierarchies. While higher education in Russia is distinct with widespread bribery, corruption in the US and the UK features a significant amount of fraud. The US is distinct with grey areas and institutional corruption in the higher education sector. Authoritarian regimes, including those in former Soviet republics, encourage educational corruption and control universities, especially during the election campaigns. This is typical for Russia, Ukraine, and Central Asian regimes, among others. The general public is well aware of the high level of corruption in colleges and universities, including thanks to the media. Doctoral education is no exception, with dissertations and doctoral degrees available for sale, including for politicians. Russian Parliament is notorious for "highly educated" MPs. High levels of corruption are a result of universities not being able to break away from their Stalinist past, over bureaucratization, and a clear lack of university autonomy. Both quantitative and qualitative methodologies are employed to study education corruption, but the topic remains largely unattended by the scholars. In many societies and international organizations, education corruption remains a taboo. In some countries, such as certain eastern European countries, some Balkan countries and certain Asian countries, corruption occurs frequently in universities. This can include bribes to bypass bureaucratic procedures and bribing faculty for a grade. The willingness to engage in corruption such as accepting bribe money in exchange for grades decreases if individuals perceive such behavior as very objectionable, i.e. a violation of social norms and if they fear sanctions regarding the severity and probability of sanctions.

==== Healthcare ====
Corruption, the abuse of entrusted power for private gain as defined by Transparency International, is systemic in the health sector. The characteristics of health systems with their concentrated supply of a service, high discretionary power of its members controlling the supply, and low accountability to others are the exact constellation of the variables described by Klitgaard on which corruption depends.

Corruption in health care poses a significant danger to public welfare. It is widespread, yet little has been published in medical journals about this topic. As of 2019, there is no evidence on what might reduce corruption in the health sector. Corruption occurs within the private and public health sectors and may appear as theft, embezzlement, nepotism, bribery up until extortion, or undue influence. It can occur anywhere within the sector, be it in service provision, purchasing, construction, and hiring. In 2019, Transparency International described the 6 most common ways of service corruption as follows: absenteeism, informal payments from patients, embezzlement, inflating services also the costs of services, favoritism, and manipulation of data (billing for goods and services that were never sent or done).

==== Labor unions ====
Labor unions leaders may be involved in corrupt action or be influenced or controlled by criminal enterprises. For example, for many years the Teamsters were substantially controlled by the Mafia.

==== Stock market corruption ====
The Indian stock exchanges, Bombay Stock Exchange and National Stock Exchange of India, have been rocked by several high-profile corruption scandals. At times, the Securities and Exchange Board of India (SEBI) has barred various individuals and entities from trading on the exchanges for stock manipulation, especially in illiquid small-cap and penny stocks.

==== Arms trafficking ====
"Arms for cash" can be done by either a state-sanctioned arms dealer, firm, or state itself to another party. It regards them as simply good business partners and not as political kindred or allies, thus making them no better than regular gun runners. Arms smugglers, who are already into arms trafficking, may work for them on the ground or with shipment. The money is often laundered and records are often destroyed. It often breaks UN, national or international law.

The Mitterrand–Pasqua affair, also known informally as Angolagate, was an international political scandal over the secret and illegal sale and shipment of arms from the nations of Central Europe to the government of Angola by the Government of France in the 1990s. It led to arrests and judiciary actions in the 2000s, involving an illegal arms sale to Angola despite a UN embargo, with business interests in France and elsewhere improperly obtaining a share of Angolan oil revenues. The scandal has subsequently been tied to several prominent figures in French politics.

42 individuals, including Jean-Christophe Mitterrand, Jacques Attali, Charles Pasqua and Jean-Charles Marchiani, Pierre Falcone. Arcadi Gaydamak, Paul-Loup Sulitzer, Union for a Popular Movement deputy Georges Fenech, Philippe Courroye the son of François Mitterrand and a former French Minister of the Interior, were charged, accused, indicted or convicted with illegal arms trading, tax fraud, embezzlement, money laundering, and other crimes.

==== Philosophy ====
The 19th-century German philosopher Arthur Schopenhauer acknowledged that academics, including philosophers, are subject to the same sources of corruption as the societies which they inhabit. He distinguished the corrupt "university" philosophers, whose "real concern is to earn with credit an honest livelihood for themselves and ... to enjoy a certain prestige in the eyes of the public" from the genuine philosopher, whose sole motive is to discover and bear witness to the truth.

To be a philosopher, that is to say, a lover of wisdom (for wisdom is nothing but truth), it is not enough for a man to love truth, in so far as it is compatible with his own interest, with the will of his superiors, with the dogmas of the church, or with the prejudices and tastes of his contemporaries; so long as he rests content with this position, he is only a φίλαυτος [lover of self], not a φιλόσοφος [lover of wisdom]. For this title of honor is well and wisely conceived precisely by its stating that one should love the truth earnestly and with one's whole heart, and thus unconditionally and unreservedly, above all else, and, if need be, in defiance of all else. Now the reason for this is the one previously stated that the intellect has become free, and in this state, it does not even know or understand any other interest than that of truth.

=== Religious organizations ===
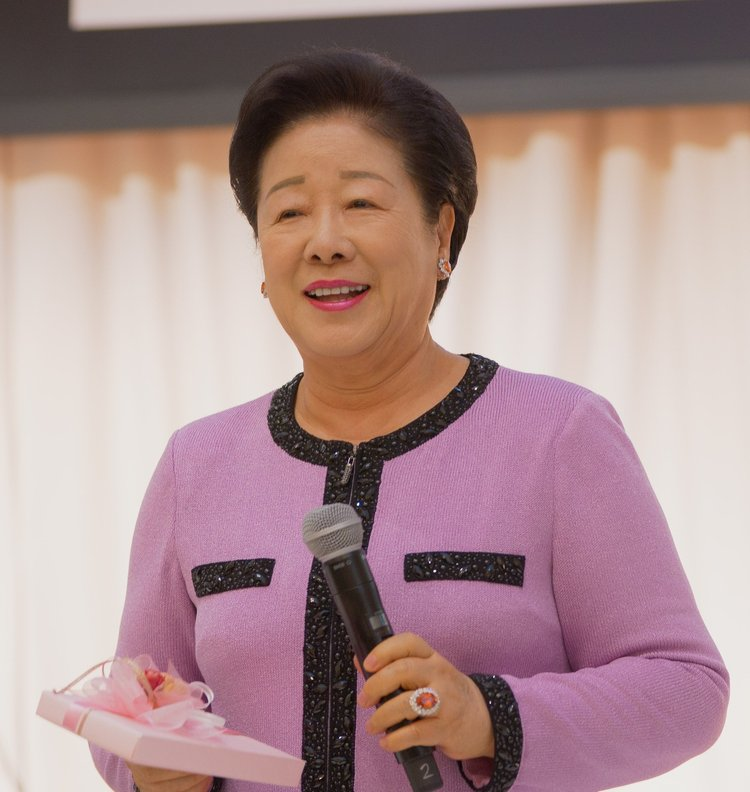
Unification Church leader Hak Ja Han was arrested in South Korea in September 2025 over allegations of bribery and illegal political funding.

The history of religion includes numerous examples of religious leaders calling attention to the corruption which existed in the religious practices and institutions of their time. The Jewish prophets Isaiah and Amos berate the rabbinical establishment of Ancient Judea for failing to live up to the ideals of the Torah. In the New Testament, Jesus accuses the rabbinical establishment of his time of hypocritically following only the ceremonial parts of the Torah and neglecting the more important elements of justice, mercy and faithfulness. Corruption was one of the important issues which led to the Investiture Controversy. In 1517, Martin Luther accused the Catholic Church of widespread corruption, including the selling of indulgences.

In 2015, Princeton University professor Kevin M. Kruse advances the thesis that business leaders in the 1930s and 1940s collaborated with clergymen, including James W. Fifield Jr., in order to develop and promote a new hermeneutical approach to Scripture which would de-emphasize the social Gospel and emphasize themes, such as individual salvation, which were more congenial to free enterprise.

Business leaders, of course, had long been working to "merchandise" themselves through the appropriation of religion. In organizations such as Spiritual Mobilization, the prayer breakfast groups, and the Freedoms Foundation, they had linked capitalism and Christianity and, at the same time, they likened the welfare state to godless paganism.

== Methods ==
In systemic corruption and grand corruption, multiple methods of corruption are used concurrently with similar aims.

=== Bribery ===
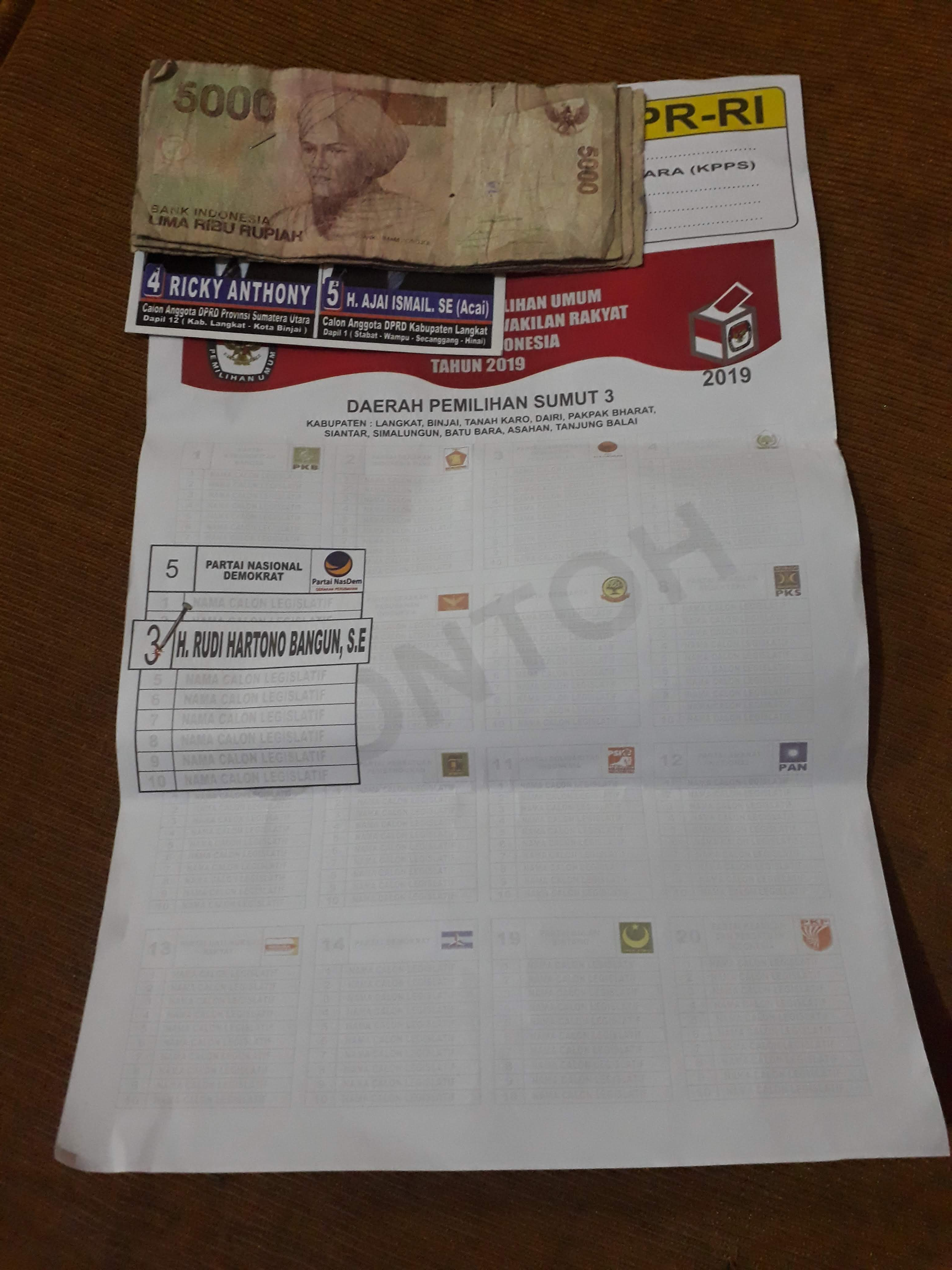
An election leaflet with money stapled to it

Bribery involves the improper use of gifts and favours in exchange for personal gain. This is also known as kickbacks or, in the Middle East, as baksheesh. It is a common form of corruption. The types of favors given are diverse and may include money, gifts, real estate, promotions, sexual favors, employee benefits, company shares, privileges, entertainment, employment and political benefits. The personal gain that is given can be anything from actively giving preferential treatment to having an indiscretion or crime overlooked.

Bribery can sometimes form a part of the systemic use of corruption for other ends, for example to perpetrate further corruption. Bribery can make officials more susceptible to blackmail or to extortion.

=== Embezzlement, theft and fraud ===
Embezzlement and theft involve someone with access to funds or assets illegally taking control of them. Fraud involves using deception to convince the owner of funds or assets to give them up to an unauthorized party.

Examples include the misdirection of company funds into "shadow companies" (and then into the pockets of corrupt employees), the skimming of foreign aid money, scams, electoral fraud and other corrupt activity.

=== Graft ===
The political act of graft is when funds intended for public projects are intentionally misdirected to maximize the benefits to private interests of the corrupt individuals.

=== Extortion and blackmail ===
While bribery is the use of positive inducements for corrupt aims, extortion and blackmail centre around the use of threats. This can be the threat of physical violence or false imprisonment as well as exposure of an individual's secrets or prior crimes.

This includes such behavior as an influential person threatening to go to the media if they do not receive speedy medical treatment (at the expense of other patients), threatening a public official with exposure of their secrets if they do not vote in a particular manner, or demanding money in exchange for continued secrecy. Another example can be a police officer being threatened with the loss of their job by their superiors, if they continued with investigating a high-ranking official.

=== Access money ===
According to Ang, access money "encompasses high-stakes rewards extended by business actors to powerful officials, not just for speed, but to access exclusive, valuable privileges." Whereas bribery and extortion is always illegal and unethical, access money can encompass both illegal and legal actions, and it can involve only corrupt individuals or entire institutions where no person is individually liable for corruption. "Illegal forms of access money entail large bribes and kickbacks, but they can also include ambiguously or completely legal exchanges that omit cash bribes, for example, cultivating political connections, campaign finance, “revolving door” practices."

=== Influence peddling ===
Influence peddling is the illegal practice of using one's influence in government or connections with persons in authority to obtain favors or preferential treatment, usually in return for payment.

=== Networking ===
Networking (both Business and Personal) can be an effective way for job-seekers to gain a competitive edge over others in the job-market. The idea is to cultivate personal relationships with prospective employers, selection panelists, and others, in the hope that these personal affections will influence future hiring decisions. This form of networking has been described as an attempt to corrupt formal hiring processes, where all candidates are given an equal opportunity to demonstrate their merits to selectors. The networker is accused of seeking non-meritocratic advantage over other candidates; advantage that is based on personal fondness rather than on any objective appraisal of which candidate is most qualified for the position.

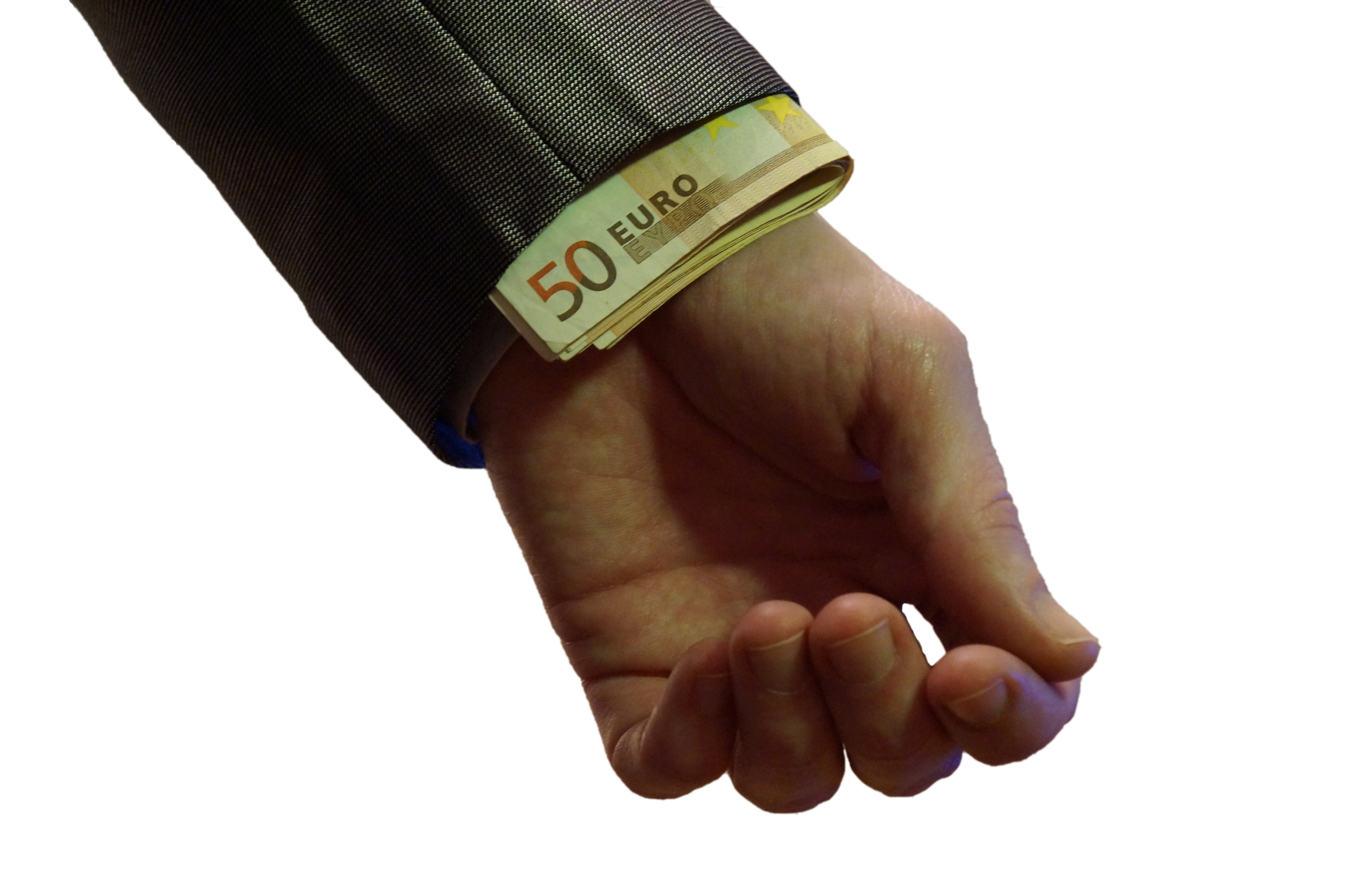
Euro bank notes hidden in sleeve

=== Abuse of discretion ===
Abuse of discretion refers to the misuse of one's powers and decision-making facilities. Examples include a judge improperly dismissing a criminal case or a customs official using their discretion to allow a banned substance through a port.

=== Favoritism, nepotism and clientelism ===
Favouritism, nepotism and clientelism involve the favouring of not the perpetrator of corruption but someone related to them, such as a friend, family member or member of an association. Examples would include hiring or promoting a family member or staff member to a role they are not qualified for, who belongs to the same political party as you, regardless of merit.

=== State capture ===
The term state capture was first used by the World Bank in 2000 to describe certain Central Asian countries making the transition from Soviet communism, where small corrupt groups used their influence over government officials to appropriate government decision-making in order to strengthen their own economic positions. The original definition of state capture refers to the way formal procedures (such as laws and social norms) and government bureaucracy are manipulated by government officials, state-backed companies, private companies or private individuals, so as to influence state policies and laws in their favour. State capture seeks to influence the formation of laws, in order to protect and promote influential actors and their interests. In this way it differs from most other forms of corruption which instead seek selective enforcement of already existing laws.

State capture is not necessarily illegal, depending on determination by the captured state itself, and may be attempted through lobbying and advocacy. The influence may be through a range of state institutions, including the legislature, executive, ministries, and the judiciary, or through a corrupt electoral process. It is similar to regulatory capture but differs in the scale and variety of influenced areas and, unlike regulatory capture, the private influence is never overt.

=== Legal corruption ===
Though corruption is often viewed as illegal, a concept of "legal corruption" has been described by Daniel Kaufmann and Pedro Vicente. It might be termed as processes which are corrupt, but are protected by a "legal" (that is, specifically permitted, or at least not proscribed by law) framework.

==== Examples ====
In 1994, the German Parliamentary Financial Commission in Bonn presented a comparative study on "legal corruption" in industrialized OECD countries They reported that in most industrial countries foreign corruption was legal, and that their foreign corrupt practices ranged from simple, through governmental subsidization (tax deduction), up to extreme cases as in Germany, where foreign corruption was fostered, whereas domestic was legally prosecuted. The German Parliamentary Financial Commission rejected a Parliamentary Proposal by the opposition, which had been aiming to limit German foreign corruption on the basis of the US Foreign Corrupt Practices Act (FCPA from 1977), thus fostering national export corporations. In 1997, a corresponding OECD Anti-Bribery Convention was signed by its members. It took until 1999, after the OECD Anti-Bribery Convention came into force, that Germany withdrew the legalization of foreign corruption.

==== Foreign corrupt practices of industrialized OECD countries 1994 study ====
A study on foreign corrupt practices of industrialized OECD countries 1994 (Parliamentary Financial Commission study, Bonn) indicates widespread acceptance of bribes in business practices.

Belgium: bribe payments are generally tax deductible as business expenses if the name and address of the beneficiary is disclosed. Under the following conditions kickbacks in connection with exports abroad are permitted for deduction even without proof of the receiver:

- Payments must be necessary in order to be able to survive against foreign competition.
- They must be common in the industry.
- A corresponding application must be made to the Treasury each year.
- Payments must be appropriate.
- The payer has to pay a lump-sum to the tax office to be fixed by the Finance Minister (at least 20% of the amount paid).

In the absence of the required conditions, for corporate taxable companies paying bribes without proof of the receiver, a special tax of 200% is charged. This special tax may, however, be abated along with the bribe amount as an operating expense.

Denmark: bribe payments are deductible when a clear operational context exists and its adequacy is maintained.

France: basically all operating expenses can be deducted. However, staff costs must correspond to an actual work done and must not be excessive compared to the operational significance. This also applies to payments to foreign parties. Here, the receiver shall specify the name and address, unless the total amount in payments per beneficiary does not exceed 500 FF. If the receiver is not disclosed the payments are considered "rémunérations occult" and are associated with the following disadvantages:

- The business expense deduction (of the bribe money) is eliminated.
- For corporations and other legal entities, a tax penalty of 100% of the "rémunérations occult" and 75% for voluntary post declaration is to be paid.
- There may be a general fine of up 200 FF fixed per case.

Japan: in Japan, bribes are deductible as business expenses that are justified by the operation (of the company) if the name and address of the recipient is specified. This also applies to payments to foreigners. If the indication of the name is refused, the expenses claimed are not recognized as operating expenses.

Canada: there is no general rule on the deductibility or non-deductibility of kickbacks and bribes. Hence the rule is that necessary expenses for obtaining the income (contract) are deductible. Payments to members of the public service and domestic administration of justice, to officers and employees and those charged with the collection of fees, entrance fees etc. for the purpose to entice the recipient to the violation of his official duties, can not be abated as business expenses as well as illegal payments according to the Criminal Code.

Luxembourg: bribes, justified by the operation (of a company) are deductible as business expenses. However, the tax authorities may require that the payer is to designate the receiver by name. If not, the expenses are not recognized as operating expenses.

Netherlands: all expenses that are directly or closely related to the business are deductible. This also applies to expenditure outside the actual business operations if they are considered beneficial to the operation for good reasons by the management. What counts is the good merchant custom. Neither the law nor the administration is authorized to determine which expenses are not operationally justified and therefore not deductible. For the business expense deduction it is not a requirement that the recipient is specified. It is sufficient to elucidate to the satisfaction of the tax authorities that the payments are in the interest of the operation.

Austria: bribes justified by the operation (of a company) are deductible as business expenses. However, the tax authority may require that the payer names the recipient of the deducted payments exactly. If the indication of the name is denied e.g. because of business comity, the expenses claimed are not recognized as operating expenses. This principle also applies to payments to foreigners.

Switzerland: bribe payments are tax deductible if it is clearly operation initiated and the consignee is indicated.

US: (rough résumé: "generally operational expenses are deductible if they are not illegal according to the FCPA").

UK: kickbacks and bribes are deductible if they have been paid for operating purposes. The tax authority may request the name and address of the recipient.

==== "Specific" legal corruption: exclusively against foreign countries ====
Referring to the recommendation of the above-mentioned Parliamentary Financial Commission's study, the then Kohl administration (1991–1994) decided to maintain the legality of corruption against officials exclusively in foreign transactions and confirmed the full deductibility of bribe money, co-financing thus a specific nationalistic corruption practice (§4 Abs. 5 Nr. 10 EStG, valid until 19 March 1999) in contradiction to the 1994 OECD recommendation. The respective law was not changed before the OECD Convention also in Germany came into force (1999). According to the Parliamentary Financial Commission's study, however, in 1994 most countries' corruption practices were not nationalistic and much more limited by the respective laws compared to Germany.

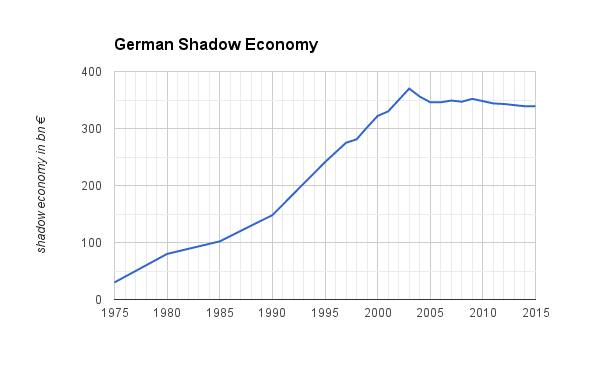
Development of the shadow economy in (West) Germany 1975–2015. Original shadow economy data from Friedrich Schneider, University Linz.

Particularly, the non-disclosure of the bribe money recipients' name in tax declarations had been a powerful instrument for Legal Corruption during the 1990s for German corporations, enabling them to block foreign legal jurisdictions which intended to fight corruption in their countries. Hence, they uncontrolled established a strong network of clientelism around Europe (e.g. SIEMENS) along with the formation of the European Single Market in the upcoming European Union and the Eurozone. Moreover, in order to further strengthen active corruption the prosecution of tax evasion during that decade had been severely limited. German tax authorities were instructed to refuse any disclosure of bribe recipients' names from tax declarations to the German criminal prosecution. As a result, German corporations have been systematically increasing their informal economy from 1980 until today up to 350 bn € per annum (see diagram on the right), thus continuously feeding their black money reserves.

==== Siemens corruption case ====
In 2007, Siemens was convicted in the District Court of Darmstadt of criminal corruption against the Italian corporation Enel Power SpA. Siemens had paid almost €3.5 million in bribes to be selected for a €200 million project from the Italian corporation, partially owned by the government. The deal was handled through black money accounts in Switzerland and Liechtenstein that were established specifically for such purposes. Because the crime was committed in 1999, after the OECD convention had come into force, this foreign corrupt practice could be prosecuted. It was the first time a German court of law convicted foreign corrupt practices like a national practice, although the corresponding law did not yet protect foreign competitors in business.

During the judicial proceedings it was disclosed that numerous such black accounts had been established in the past decades.

== Measurement ==
Several organizations measure corruption as part of their development indexes. The Corruption Perceptions Index (CPI) ranks countries "by their perceived levels of public sector corruption, as determined by expert assessments and opinion surveys." The index has been published annually by the non-governmental organization Transparency International since 1995. On the supply side, Transparency International used to publish the Bribe Payers Index, but stopped in 2011.

The Global Corruption Index (GCI), designed by the Global Risk Profile to be in line with anti-corruption and anti-bribery legislation, covers 196 countries and territories. It measures the state of corruption and white-collar crimes around the world, specifically money laundering and terrorism financing.

Absence of corruption is one of the eight factors the World Justice Project Rule of Law Index measures to evaluate adherence to the rule of law in 140 countries and jurisdictions around the globe. The annual index measures three forms of government corruption across the executive branch, the judiciary, the military and police, and the legislature: bribery, improper influence by public or private interests, and misappropriation of public funds or other resources.

The Unbundled Corruption Index (UCI) measures perceived levels of corruption in four categories: petty theft, grand theft, speed money, access money. It uses "stylized vignettes" instead of broadly worded survey questions.

== Relationship to economic growth ==
Different types of corruption harm in different ways, though not all are immediately growth-impeding. Following an "Unbundled Corruption" framework, Ang describes using the analogy of drugs: "Petty theft and grand theft are like toxic drugs; they directly and unambiguously hurt the economy by draining public and private wealth while delivering no benefits in return. Speed money is akin to painkillers; it may relieve a headache but doesn't improve one's strength. Access money, on the other hand, is like steroids. It spurs muscle growth and allows one to perform superhuman feats, but it comes with serious side effects, including the possibility of a complete meltdown."

Corruption can negatively impact the economy both directly, through for example tax evasion and money laundering, as well as indirectly by distorting fair competition and fair markets, and by increasing the cost of doing business. It is strongly negatively associated with the share of private investment and, hence, lowers the economic growth rate.

Corruption reduces the returns of productive activities. If the production returns fall faster than the returns to corruption and rent-seeking activities, resources will flow from productive activities to corruption activities over time. This will result in a lower stock of producible inputs like human capital in corrupted countries.

Corruption creates the opportunity for increased inequality, reduces the return of productive activities, and, hence, makes rent-seeking and corruption activities more attractive. This opportunity for increased inequality not only generates psychological frustration for the underprivileged but also reduces productivity growth, investment, and job opportunities.

Some experts have suggested that corruption stimulated economic growth in East and Southeast Asian countries. An often-cited example is South Korea, where President Park Chung Hee favored a small number of companies, and later used this financial influence to pressure these chaebols to follow the government's development strategy. This 'profit-sharing' corruption model incentivizes government officials to support economic development, as they would personally benefit financially from it.

One neglected example of high growth with corruption is the American Gilded Age, which Yuen Yuen Ang has compared to China's Gilded Age. In both, she noted, "corruption evolved over time from thuggery and theft to more sophisticated exchanges of power and profit," and resultingly, both saw unequal and risky growth. Biased narratives about global corruption metrics have obscured this historical pattern.

== Prevention ==
=== Competition law ===
Breaking up monopolies and increasing competition tends to reduce corruption caused by companies. On the other hand, biased competition law enforcement can create corruption. Transparency with public access to reliable information could reduce the problem. Djankov and other researchers have independently addressed the role information plays in fighting corruption with evidence from both developing and developed countries. Disclosing financial information of government officials to the public is associated with improving institutional accountability and eliminating misbehavior such as vote buying. The effect is specifically remarkable when the disclosures concern politicians' income sources, liabilities and asset level instead of just income level. Any extrinsic aspects that might reduce morality should be eliminated. Additionally, a country should establish a culture of ethical conduct in society with the government setting the good example in order to enhance the intrinsic morality.

=== Enhancing civil society participation ===
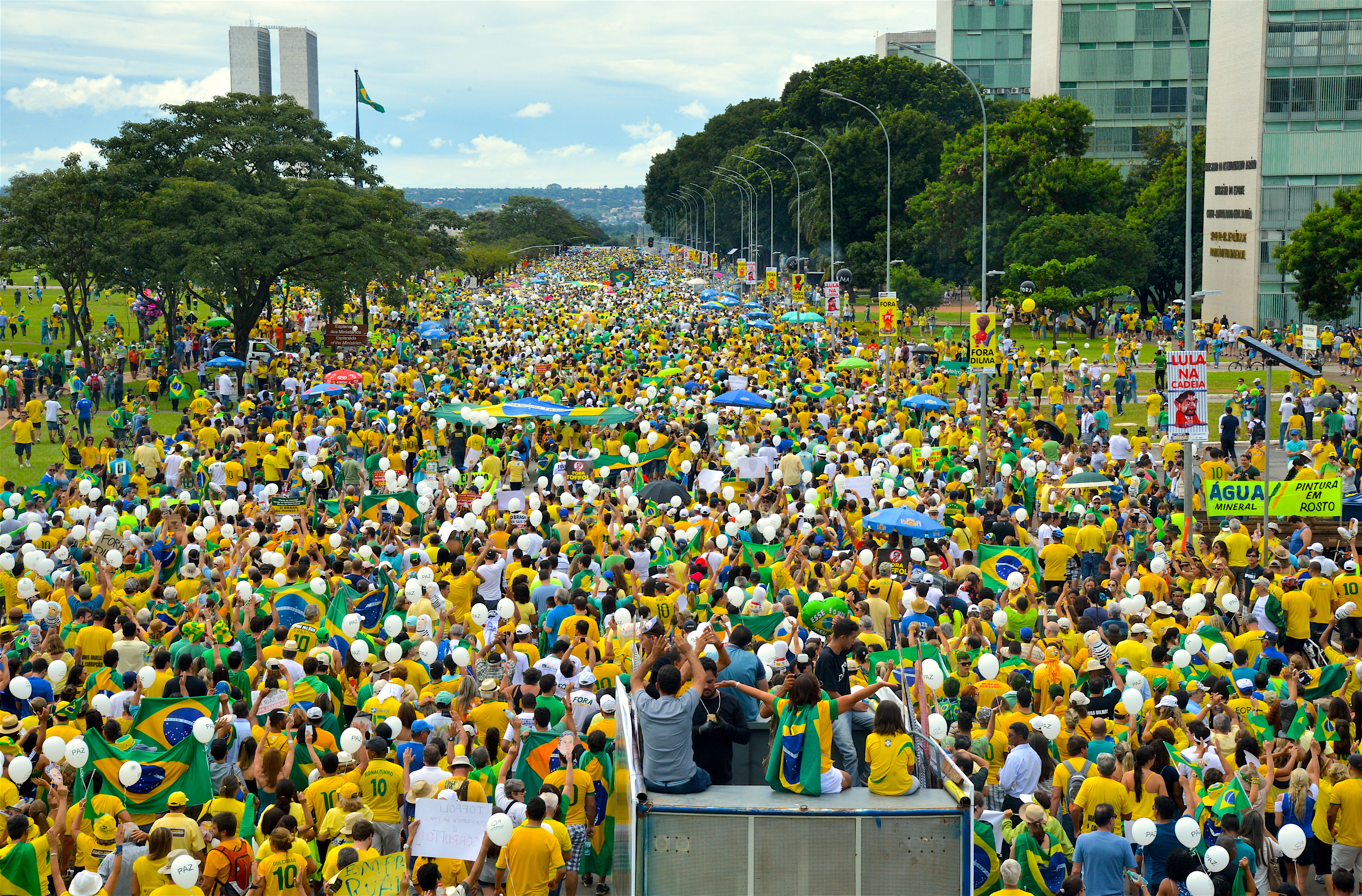
Protests in Brazil in 2015–2016 were sparked by revelations that a number of politicians had accepted bribes linked to contracts at the state-owned energy company Petrobras.

Creating bottom-up mechanisms, promoting citizens participation and encouraging the values of integrity, accountability, and transparency are crucial components of fighting corruption. As of 2012, the implementation of the "Advocacy and Legal Advice Centres (ALACs)” in Europe had led to a significant increase in the number of citizen complaints against acts of corruption received and documented and also to the development of strategies for good governance by involving citizens willing to fight against corruption.

=== Anti-corruption programmes ===
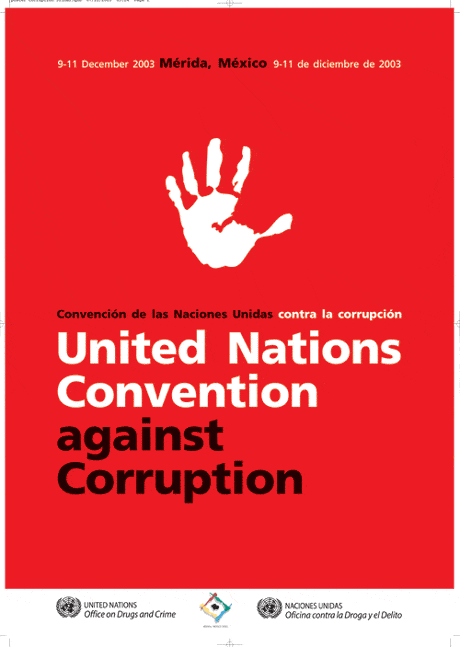
United Nations Convention against Corruption

The Foreign Corrupt Practices Act (FCPA, USA 1977) was an early paradigmatic law for many western countries i.e. industrial countries of the OECD. There, for the first time the old principal-agent approach was moved back where mainly the victim (a society, private or public) and a passive corrupt member (an individual) were considered, whereas the active corrupt part was not in the focus of legal prosecution. Unprecedented, the law of an industrial country directly condemned active corruption, particularly in international business transactions, which was at that time in contradiction to anti-bribery activities of the World Bank and its spin-off organization Transparency International.

As early as 1989 the OECD had established an ad hoc Working Group in order to explore "the concepts fundamental to the offense of corruption, and the exercise of national jurisdiction over offenses committed wholly or partially abroad." Based on the FCPA concept, the Working Group presented in 1994 the then "OECD Anti-Bribery Recommendation" as precursor for the OECD Convention on Combating Bribery of Foreign Public Officials in International Business Transactions which was signed in 1997 by all member countries and came finally into force in 1999. However, because of ongoing concealed corruption in international transactions several instruments of Country Monitoring have been developed since then by the OECD in order to foster and evaluate related national activities in combating foreign corrupt practices. One survey shows that after the implementation of heightened review of multinational firms under the convention in 2010 firms from countries that had signed the convention were less likely to use bribery.

In 2013, a document produced by the economic and private sector professional evidence and applied knowledge services help-desk discusses some of the existing practices on anti-corruption. They found:

- The theories behind the fight against corruption are moving from a principal agent approach to a collective action problem. Principal–agent theories seem not to be suitable to target systemic corruption.
- The role of multilateral institutions has been crucial in the fight against corruption. UNCAC provides a common guideline for countries around the world. Both Transparency International and the World Bank provide assistance to national governments in term of diagnostic and design of anti-corruption policies.
- The use of anti-corruption agencies have proliferated in recent years after the signing of UNCAC. They found no convincing evidence on the extent of their contribution, or the best way to structure them.
- Traditionally anti-corruption policies have been based on success experiences and common sense. In recent years there has been an effort to provide a more systematic evaluation of the effectiveness of anti-corruption policies. They found that this literature is still in its infancy.
- Anti-corruption policies that may be in general recommended to developing countries may not be suitable for post-conflict countries. Anti-corruption policies in fragile states have to be carefully tailored.
- Anti-corruption policies can improve the business environment. There is evidence that lower corruption may facilitate doing business and improve firm's productivity. Rwanda in the last decade has made tremendous progress in improving governance and the business environment providing a model to follow for post-conflict countries.
- Armenia aims to achieve zero corruption through raising awareness on the societal hazards. After the lavish spending accusations on the Armenian anti-corruption council, through action strategies with implementation and observing instruments progress is noticeable.

In recent years, anti-corruption efforts have also been criticised for overemphasising the benefits of the eradication of corruption for economic growth and development, following a diversity of literature which has suggested that anti-corruption efforts, the right kind of institutions and "good governance" are key to economic development. This criticism is based on the observed fact that a variety of countries, such as Korea and China but also the US in the 19th and early 20th century, saw high economic growth and broader socio-economic development coinciding with significant corruption.

== In popular culture ==
In some countries people travel to corruption hot spots or a specialist tour company takes them on corruption city tours, as is the case in Prague. Corruption tours have also occurred in Chicago and Mexico City.

Films about corruption include Runaway Jury, The Firm, Syriana, The Constant Gardener, and All the President's Men.

An 2026 United States opinion poll found 92% view corruption as a big problem in politics. Citizens tend to define corruption broadly including personal gain by politicians and wasteful government spending.

== Historical responses in philosophical and religious thought ==
Philosophers and religious thinkers have responded to the inescapable reality of corruption in different ways. Plato, in The Republic, acknowledges the corrupt nature of political institutions, and recommends that philosophers "shelter behind a wall" to avoid senselessly martyring themselves.

Disciples of philosophy ... have tasted how sweet and blessed a possession philosophy is, and have also seen and been satisfied of the madness of the multitude, and known that there is no one who ever acts honestly in the administration of States, nor any helper who will save any one who maintains the cause of the just. Such a savior would be like a man who has fallen among wild beasts—unable to join in the wickedness of his fellows, neither would he be able alone to resist all their fierce natures, and therefore he would be of no use to the State or to his friends, and would have to throw away his life before he had done any good to himself or others. And he reflects upon all this, and holds his peace, and does his own business. He is like one who retires under the shelter of a wall in the storm of dust and sleet which the driving wind hurries along; and when he sees the rest of mankind full of wickedness, he is content if only he can live his own life and be pure from evil or unrighteousness, and depart in peace and good will, with bright hopes.

— Plato, Republic, 496d

The New Testament, in keeping with the tradition of Ancient Greek thought, also frankly acknowledges the corruption of the world (ὁ κόσμος) and claims to offer a way of keeping the spirit "unspotted from the world." Paul of Tarsus acknowledges his readers must inevitably "deal with the world," and recommends they adopt an attitude of "as if not" in all their dealings. When they buy a thing, for example, they should relate to it "as if it were not theirs to keep." New Testament readers are advised to refuse to "conform to the present age" and not to be ashamed to be peculiar or singular. They are advised not be friends of the corrupt world, because "friendship with the world is enmity with God." They are advised not to love the corrupt world or the things of the world. The rulers of this world, Paul explains, "are coming to nothing" While readers must obey corrupt rulers in order to live in the world, the spirit is subject to no law but to love God and love our neighbors as ourselves. New Testament readers are advised to adopt a disposition in which they are "in the world, but not of the world." This disposition, Paul claims, shows us a way to escape "slavery to corruption" and experience the freedom and glory of being innocent "children of God".

== Statistics ==
The table below shows recent reported corruption cases by country per 100,000 population.

Country	Reported annual corruption cases per 100,000	Year
Albania	25.8	2024
Algeria	1.8	2024
Andorra	0.0	2019
Antigua and Barbuda	0.0	2024
Armenia	30.9	2024
Austria	58.3	2024
Azerbaijan	3.1	2024
Bahamas	207.8	2023
Barbados	0.0	2024
Belgium	38.9	2024
Belize	0.7	2022
Bhutan	0.3	2020
Bolivia	4.6	2023
Bosnia and Herzegovina	17.8	2024
Brazil	1.2	2024
Bulgaria	7.7	2024
Cameroon	0.7	2020
Chile	3.0	2023
Colombia	24.0	2024
Costa Rica	51.5	2024
Croatia	15.5	2024
Cyprus	0.8	2024
Czech Republic	14.0	2024
Denmark	81.0	2024
Djibouti	10.7	2018
Dominica	49.8	2024
Dominican Republic	0.3	2016
Ecuador	6.4	2024
El Salvador	0.9	2022
Estonia	4.6	2024
Eswatini	0.0	2021
Finland	126.3	2024
France	4.3	2024
Georgia	16.7	2019
Germany	8.7	2024
Greece	7.1	2024
Grenada	0.0	2023
Guatemala	29.6	2024
Guinea-Bissau	2.0	2016
Guyana	1.7	2024
Honduras	8.2	2024
Hungary	65.3	2024
Indonesia	0.2	2024
Ireland	0.1	2024
Italy	4.2	2024
Jamaica	10.8	2024
Jordan	0.6	2024
Kazakhstan	11.3	2020
Kenya	0.2	2023
Kosovo	14.8	2016
Kyrgyzstan	20.7	2023
Latvia	5.0	2024
Lebanon	0.6	2016
Liechtenstein	12.5	2024
Lithuania	10.3	2024
Luxembourg	0.0	2022
Macau	0.0	2024
Malaysia	2.9	2023
Maldives	118.0	2017
Malta	18.7	2024
Mauritius	48.7	2021
Mexico	16.6	2024
Moldova	27.4	2024
Monaco	1553.3	2016
Mongolia	16.6	2024
Montenegro	22.1	2024
Morocco	63.7	2023
Myanmar	0.0	2023
Namibia	2.9	2021
Netherlands	30.7	2024
New Zealand	0.0	2023
North Macedonia	1.2	2024
Norway	0.6	2024
Oman	0.3	2023
Palestine	16.2	2018
Panama	23.6	2024
Paraguay	20.7	2024
Peru	4.2	2022
Philippines	0.0	2024
Poland	9.3	2024
Portugal	2.1	2024
Qatar	0.3	2021
Romania	15.6	2024
Russia	21.1	2020
Saint Kitts and Nevis	4.3	2024
Saint Lucia	0.0	2023
Saudi Arabia	29.2	2019
Scotland	3.9	2023
Senegal	0.3	2016
Serbia	10.0	2024
Singapore	26.0	2024
Slovakia	0.9	2024
Slovenia	33.1	2024
Spain	3.1	2024
St. Vincent and Grenadines	0.0	2024
Sweden	221.8	2024
Switzerland	0.4	2024
Syria	0.1	2018
Thailand	16.9	2023
Trinidad and Tobago	0.1	2020
Turkey	9.2	2014
Uganda	1.4	2017
Ukraine	4.1	2020
United Arab Emirates	0.5	2023
United States of America	22.9	2023
Uruguay	12.4	2024
Vatican City	0.0	2024
Zimbabwe	0.3	2023

== See also ==
- 1Malaysia Development Berhad scandal
- Academic careerism
- Accounting scandals
- Active corruption
- Anti-globalization movement
- Appearance of corruption
- Biens mal acquis
- Business ethics
- Business oligarch
- Bribe Payers Index
- Blue wall of silence
- Command responsibility
- Conflict of interest
- Crony capitalism
- Corporate abuse
- Corporate Accountability International
- Corporate warfare
- Corporate crime
- Corporate malfeasance
- Corporate tax haven
- Corruption in local government
- Corruption Perceptions Index
- Cover-up
- Enron
- Federal Bureau of Investigation
- Fraternization
- Graft (politics)
- Guanxi
- Goldman Sachs
- High-trust and low-trust societies
- Investigative magistrate
- Industrial espionage
- Kaunas golden toilet case
- Kickback
- Kleptocracy
- List of companies convicted of felony offenses in the United States
- Meritocracy
- Multinational Monitor
- Noble cause corruption
- Non-disclosure agreement
- Operation Car Wash
- Patronage
- Penny stock scam
- Privilege (evidence)
- Pump and dump
- Pay to play
- Professional courtesy
- Political repression
- Poisoning the well
- Regulatory capture
- Second economy of the Soviet Union
- Social influence
- Sexual misconduct
- Tax evasion
- Tax havens
- Trial in absentia
- United Nations Convention against Corruption
- Whistleblowers
