= Corporate crime =

Crimes committed either by a corporation or its representatives

In criminology, Pearce and Tombs define corporate crime as:

Illegal acts or omissions, punishable by the state under administrative, civil or criminal law which are the result of deliberate decision making or culpable negligence within a legitimate formal organisation. These acts or omissions are based in legitimate, formal, business organisations, made in accordance with the normative goals, standard operating procedures, and/or cultural norms of the organisation, and are intended to benefit the corporation itself.

These crimes are committed by legal persons (e.g. a company, as opposed to a natural person) or individuals acting on behalf of a company or other business entity (for example see vicarious liability). Corporate crime is distinct from other workplace crimes like white-collar crime because illegalities are committed for and congruent with the goals of legitimate (i.e. registered) companies, such as safety crime or price fixing. The principles of rational choice theory and rational actors are foundational to corporate crime.

Corporate crimes involving health and safety offences may result in nearly 3 million work-related fatalities from injuries and ill-health every year worldwide, as the International Labour Organisation estimates that 2.93 million workers die each year from work-related factors (see Occupational safety and health). Overall, discussions on corporate crime are not usually prominent in academic, political, or public discourse. Many academics, such as Tombs and Whyte, note the relative obscurity of corporate crime in discussions concerning criminology.

Corporate crime shares similarities with:

- white-collar crime, because the majority of individuals who may act as or represent the interests of the corporation are white-collar professionals;
- organized crime, because criminals may set up corporations either for the purposes of crime or as vehicles for laundering the proceeds of crime;
- and state-corporate crime because, in many contexts, the opportunity to commit crime emerges from the relationship between the corporation and the state.

== Definitional issues ==
=== Legal person ===
An 1886 decision of the United States Supreme Court, in Santa Clara County v. Southern Pacific Railroad 118 U.S. 394 (1886), has been cited by various courts in the US as precedent to maintaining that a corporation can be defined legally as a "person", as described in the Fourteenth Amendment to the U.S. Constitution. The Fourteenth Amendment stipulates that,

No State shall make or enforce any law which shall abridge the privileges or immunities of citizens of the United States; nor shall any State deprive any person of life, liberty, or property, without due process of law; nor deny to any person within its jurisdiction the equal protection of the laws.

In English law, this was matched by the decision in Salomon v A Salomon & Co Ltd [1897] AC 22. In Australian law, under the Corporations Act 2001 (Cth), a corporation is legally a "person".

=== Criminal capacity ===
The concepts of crime and punishment, as they apply to individuals, cannot be easily transferred to the corporate domain. International treaties governing corporate malfeasance thus tend to permit but not require corporate criminal liability. Recently a number of countries and the European Union have been working to establish corporate criminal liability for certain offences."Liability of Legal Persons for Corruption Offences". 2021-05-13. United States law currently recognizes corporate criminal capacity, although it is extremely rare for corporations to be litigated in criminal proceedings. French law currently recognizes corporate criminal capacity. German law does not recognize corporate criminal capacity: German corporations are however subject to fining for administrative violations (Ordnungswidrigkeiten)

=== Enforcement policy ===
Corporate crime has become politically sensitive in some countries. In the United Kingdom, for example, following wider publicity of fatal accidents on the rail network and at sea, the term is commonly used in reference to corporate manslaughter and to involve a more general discussion about the technological hazards posed by business enterprises (see Wells: 2001).

In the United States, the Sarbanes-Oxley Act of 2002 was passed to reform business practices, including enhanced corporate responsibility, financial disclosures, and combat fraud, following the highly publicized and extremely harmful (to victims) scandals of Enron, WorldCom, Freddie Mac, Lehman Brothers, and Bernie Madoff. Company chief executive officer (CEO) and company chief financial officer (CFO) are required to personally certify financial reports to be accurate and compliant with applicable laws, with criminal penalties for willful misconduct including monetary fines up to $5,000,000 and prison sentence up to 20 years.

The Law Reform Commission of New South Wales offers an explanation of such criminal activities:

Corporate crime poses a significant threat to the welfare of the community. Given the pervasive presence of corporations in a wide range of activities in our society, and the impact of their actions on a much wider group of people than are affected by individual action, the potential for both economic and physical harm caused by a corporation is great (Law Reform Commission of New South Wales: 2001).

Similarly, Russell Mokhiber and Robert Weissman (1999) assert:

At one level, corporations develop new technologies and economies of scale. These may serve the economic interests of mass consumers by introducing new products and more efficient methods of mass production. On another level, given the absence of political control today, corporations serve to destroy the foundations of the civic community and the lives of the people who reside in them.

== Criminalization ==
Behavior can be regulated by the civil law (including administrative law) or the criminal law. In deciding to criminalize particular behavior, the legislature is making the political judgment that this behavior is sufficiently culpable to deserve the stigma of being labelled as a crime. In law, corporations can commit the same offences as natural persons. Simpson (2002) avers that this process should be straightforward because a state should simply engage in victimology to identify which behavior causes the most loss and damage to its citizens, and then represent the majority view that justice requires the intervention of the criminal law. But states depend on the business sector to deliver a functioning economy, so the politics of regulating the individuals and corporations that supply that stability become more complex. For the views of Marxist criminology, see Snider (1993) and Snider & Pearce (1995), for Left realism, see Pearce & Tombs (1992) and Schulte-Bockholt (2001), and for Right Realism, see Reed & Yeager (1996). More specifically, the historical tradition of sovereign state control of prisons is ending through the process of privatisation. Corporate profitability in these areas therefore depends on building more prison facilities, managing their operations, and selling inmate labor. In turn, this requires a steady stream of prisoners able to work. (Kicenski: 2002)

Bribery and corruption are problems in the developed world, and the corruption of public officials is thought to be a serious problem in developing countries, and an obstacle to development.

Edwin Sutherland's definition of white-collar crime also is related to notions of corporate crime. In his landmark definition of white collar crime he offered these categories of crime:

- Misrepresentation in financial statements of corporations
- Manipulation in the stock market
- Commercial bribery
- Bribery of public officials directly or indirectly
- Misrepresentation in advertisement and salesmanship
- Embezzlement and misappropriation of funds
- Misapplication of funds in receiverships and bankruptcies (O'Grady: 2011).

== Corruption and the private sector review ==
One paper discusses some of the issues that arise in the relationship between the private sector and corruption. The findings can be summarized as follows:

- They present evidence that corruption induces informality by acting as a barrier to entry into the formal sector. Firms that are forced to go underground operate at a smaller scale and are less productive.
- Corruption also affects the growth of firms in the private sector. This result seems to be independent of the size of the firm. A channel through which corruption may affect the growth prospects of firms is through its negative impact on product innovation.
- SMEs pay higher bribes as percentage of revenue compared with large companies and bribery seems to be the main form of corruption affecting SMEs.
- Bribery is not the only form of corruption affecting large firms. Embezzlement by a company's own employees, corporate fraud, and insider trading can be very damaging to enterprises too.
- There is evidence that the private sector has as much responsibility for generating corruption as the public sector. Particular situations such as state capture can be very damaging for the economy.
- Corruption is a symptom of poor governance. Governance can only be improved via coordinated efforts among governments, businesses, civil society.

== Organi-cultural deviance ==
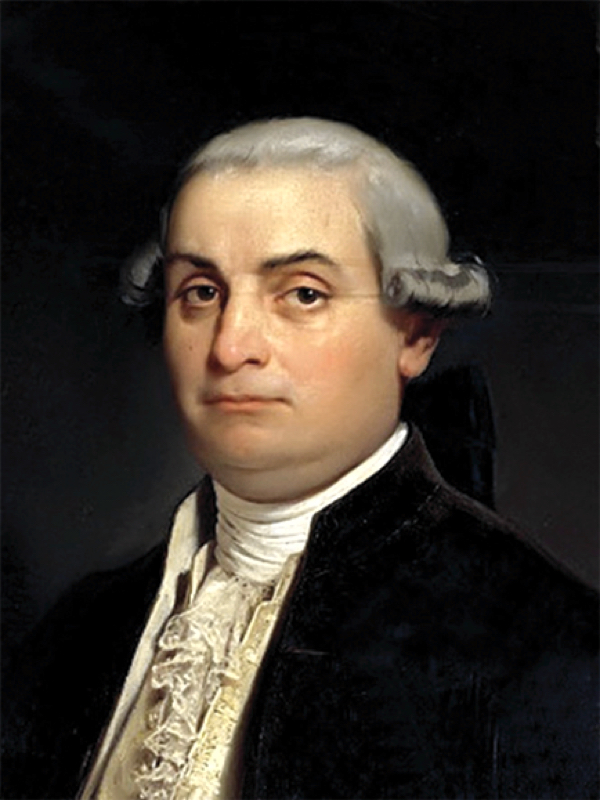
Cesare Beccaria (1738-1794) pioneered the study of crime.

Organi-cultural deviance is a recent philosophical model used in academia and corporate criminology that views corporate crime as a body of social, behavioral, and environmental processes leading to deviant acts. This view of corporate crime differs from that of Edwin Sutherland (1949), who referred to corporate crime as white-collar crime, in that Sutherland viewed corporate crime as something done by an individual as an isolated end unto itself. With the Organi-cultural deviance view, corporate crime can be engaged in by individuals, groups, organizations, and groups of organizations, all within an organizational context. This view also takes into account micro and macro social, environmental, and personality factors, using a holistic systems approach to understanding the causation of corporate crime.

The term derives its meaning from the words organization (a structured unit) and culture (the set of shared attitudes, values, goals, and practices). This reflects the view that corporate cultures may encourage or accept deviant behaviors that differ from what is normal or accepted in the broader society. Organi-cultural deviance explains the deviant behaviors (defined by societal norms) engaged in by individuals or groups of individuals.

Because corporate crime has often been seen as an understudy of common crime and criminology, it is only recently that the study of corporate crime has been included in coursework and degree programs directly related to criminal justice, business management, and organizational psychology. This is partly due to a lack of an official definition for crimes committed in the context of organizations and corporations.

The social philosophical study of common crime gained recognition through Cesare Beccaria during the 18th century, when Beccaria was heralded as the Father of the Classical School of Criminology.

However, corporate crime was not officially recognized as an independent area of study until Edwin Sutherland provided a definition of white-collar crime in 1949. Sutherland in 1949, argued to the American Sociological Society the need to expand the boundaries of the study of crime to include the criminal act of respectable individuals in the course of their occupation.

In 2008, Christie Husted found corporate crime to be a complex dynamic of system-level processes, personality traits, macro-environmental, and social influences, requiring a holistic approach to studying corporate crime. Husted, in her 2008 doctoral thesis, Systematic Differentiation Between Dark and Light Leaders: Is a Corporate Criminal Profile Possible?, coined the term organi-cultural deviance to explain these social, situational and environmental factors giving rise to corporate crime.

=== Application ===
Renée Gendron and Christie Husted, through their research conducted in 2008-2012, expanded the concept of organi-cultural deviance, in papers presented at the Academy of Criminal Justice Sciences conference Toronto, Canada, the American Association of Behavioral and Social Sciences Annual Conference, Las Vegas, Nevada, the General Meeting of the Administrative Sciences Association of Canada, in Regina, Saskatchewan, Canada, and The Humanities conference in Montréal, Canada. The term organi-cultural deviance incorporated the terms group think, and yes-men, to explain decision-related cognitive impairments inherent of corporations engaging in corporate crime. The researchers have found several interconnected dynamics that increase the likelihood of white-collar crime. The researchers have found specific group dynamics involved in white-collar crime are similar to the group dynamics present in gangs, organized crime organizations as well as cults. Moreover, the researchers have found that there are systems-level forces influencing the behaviors and cognitions of individuals.

The subject of organi-cultural deviance was first taught in business management, leadership classes, and in a class titled Corporate Misconduct in America, at Casper College during 2008-2009. Organi-cultural deviance was introduced to students as a social philosophical term used to help describe, explain, and understand the complex social, behavioral, and environmental forces, that lead organizations to engage in corporate crime.

=== Social dynamics ===
The term organi-cultural deviance was later expanded and published in a 2011 paper titled Socialization of Individuals into Deviant Corporate Culture. Organi-cultural deviance was used to describe how processes of individual and group socialization, within deviant corporate cultures, serve to invert Abraham Maslow's (1954) Hierarchy of Needs into a theoretical "Hierarchical Funnel of Individual Needs".

Organi-cultural deviance was further explored by Gendron and Husted, using a micro-environmental approach, identifying social dynamics within deviant organizations believed to lure and capture individuals. However, through the social processes inherent of organi-cultural deviance, social pressures and influences force the individual to vacate aspirations to reach self-actualization and become complacent on satisfying lower needs, such as belongingness. In organi-cultural deviance, social dynamics and micro-environmental forces are believed, by Gendron and Husted, to result in the individual's dependence upon the organization for their basic needs.

Organizations engaging in organi-cultural deviance use manipulation and a façade of honesty, with promises of meeting the individual's needs of self-actualization. The social forces such as the use of physical and psychological violence to maintain compliance with organizational goals within deviant organizations secure the individual's dependence upon the organization for satisfaction of their basic needs. As the process of organi-cultural deviance escalates, the complacency to meet mid-level needs becomes a dependency on the organization to satisfy the lower needs of the pyramid, the individual's basic needs. In the paper Using Gang and Cult Typologies to Understand Corporate Crimes, Gendron and Husted found organizations engaging in organi-cultural deviance used coercive power, monetary, physical and/or psychological threats, to maintain their gravitational hold on the individual.

In the 2011 paper, Using Gang and Cult Typologies to Understand Corporate Crimes, organi-cultural deviance was used to compare the cultures of: mafias, cults, gangs and deviant corporations, each of which was assumed to be a type of deviant organization. In these types of organizations, organi-cultural deviance was found to be present. In engaging in organi-cultural deviance, these organizations leverage four resources: information, violence, reputation and publicity. These types of organizations engaging in organi-cultural deviance were found to contain toxic leadership. Deviant organizations, engaging in organi-cultural deviance, were found to leverage their reputation through publicity to attract members. The combination of adverse psychological forces, combined with the real need for its employees to survive (earn a living, avoid bullying) act as a type of organizational gravitational pull. The concept of organi-cultural deviance includes both micro (personal, psychological or otherwise internal forces exercising influence over an individual's behavior) and macro influences (group dynamics, organizational culture, inter-organizational forces as well as system pressures and constraints, such as a legal system or overall economic environment).

=== Environmental influences ===
In a 2012 paper titled Organi-cultural Deviance: Economic Cycles Predicting Corporate Misconduct?, Gendron and Husted found economic cycles result in strain, seen as a precipitating factor in organi-cultural deviance. Organi-cultural deviance is based on the premise social pressure and economic forces exert strain on organizations to engage in corporate crime. Strain creates motivating tension in organi-cultural deviance. Robert Merton championed strain theorists in the field of criminology, believing there to be "a universal set of goals toward which all Americans, regardless of background and position, strive, chief among these is monetary success". Economic cycles result in observable patterns which are indicative of organi-cultural deviance.

Organi-cultural deviance is likely to occur at different points in an economic cycle and system. The specific location of an economy in the economic cycle tends to generate specific kinds of leaders. Entrepreneurial leaders tend to be most visible at the bottom of an economic cycle, during a depression or recession. Entrepreneurial leaders are able to motivate their employees to innovate and develop new products. As the economy strengthens, there is a marked increase of bureaucratic leaders who standardise and operationalise the successes of entrepreneurial leaders. As the economy reaches the apex of the economic cycle, pseudo-transformational leaders are likely to emerge, promising the same, if not higher, rates of return in a booming or peaking economy. Often, these pseudo-transformational leaders engage in deviant practices to maintain the illusion of rising rates of return.

== See also ==
- Penny stock scam
- Pump and dump
- Accounting scandals
- Business ethics
- Corporate abuse
- Corporate Accountability International
- Corporate warfare
- Industrial espionage
- List of companies convicted of felony offenses in the United States
- Multinational Monitor
- Operation Car Wash
- Private sector participation in Nazi crimes
- Corruption
- Corporate manslaughter
- Corporate death penalty
- Corporate liability
