= Corruption in Lithuania =

Corruption in Lithuania describes the prevention and occurrence of corruption in Lithuania.

== Summary ==
The Freedom in the World 2020 report by Freedom House notes that corruption remains an issue in Lithuania, but gives high scores for the main related areas: strong and effective safeguards against official corruption (3 out of 4), government openness and transparency (3 out of 4), and an independent judiciary (3 out of 4).

The European Research Centre for Anti-Corruption and State-Building (ERCAS) notes that while Lithuania has a comprehensive anti-corruption legal base established, the law enforcement institutions are weak. In the Public Integrity Index 2019, published by the centre, Lithuania ranks 30th out of 117 countries.

According to the Flash Eurobarometer 482: Businesses' attitudes towards corruption in the EU, published by the European Commission in 2019, only 15% of business executives noted corruption as a problem when doing business. The Lithuanian Map of Corruption 2019 report, published by the STT, notes that the percentage of businesses that paid a bribe has been gradually decreasing over the last decades, with only 9% of business paying it in the last 5 years and 5% in the last 12 months.

According to the Global Corruption Barometer of the European Union in 2021 (GCB EU 2021), 48% of Lithuanians think that the government is doing badly in fighting corruption while 42% think it's doing well, nearly matching the EU average of 49% and 43% respectively.

=== Extent ===
According to the GCB EU 2021 report, people consider that the most corrupt institutions or individuals are: members of parliament (33%), business executives (27%), local government representatives and mayors (21%), judges and magistrates (21%). The report notes the most common cases of bribery in the last 12 months by service: healthcare institutions (19%), identity documents (6%) and police (4%).

Lithuanian Map of Corruption 2019 report, published by STT, provides an overview based on the surveys of the population, company executives and public servants. According to the survey of people, the most common forms of corruption are: nepotism, political patronage and bribery. The most common cases of corruption were perceived to be in: healthcare institutions, the courts, the parliament, municipalities and political parties.

According to a Baltijos tyrimai poll in 2019, the police were trusted by 69% of people, the Constitutional Court of Lithuania by 62%, and the STT by 55%. However, only 39% of people trusted the prosecutors and 33% trusted the courts. A survey conducted by Vilmorus in 2020 showed that the most corrupt areas perceived by the respondents were: healthcare (47%), the courts (37%) and the parliament (30%). The same survey notes that Lithuanians regard corruption as the fourth most acute problem in the country. Only 3% of the people surveyed admitted to giving bribes in the previous year.

=== International rankings ===
Index	Rank	Countries reviewed
Corruption Perceptions Index 2025	28th	182
ERCAS Public Integrity Index 2019	30th	117

According to Transparency International's 2025 Corruption Perceptions Index, Lithuania ranked 28th among the 182 countries in the Index, where the country ranked first is perceived to have the most honest public sector. The Index scores countries on a scale from 0 ("highly corrupt") to 100 ("very clean") and then ranks the countries by score. Lithuania's 2025 rank was based on a score of 65. For comparison with regional scores, the best score among Western European and European Union countries (Note: Austria, Belgium, Bulgaria, Croatia, Cyprus, Czechia, Denmark, Estonia, Finland, France, Germany, Greece, Hungary, Iceland, Ireland, Italy, Latvia, Lithuania, Luxembourg, Malta, Netherlands, Norway, Poland, Portugal, Romania, Slovakia, Slovenia, Spain, Sweden, Switzerland, and the United Kingdom.) was 89, the average score was 64 and the worst score was 40. For comparison with worldwide scores, the best score was 89 (ranked 1), the average score was 42, and the worst score was 9 (ranked 181, in a two-way tie).

== Anti-corruption mechanisms ==
Special Investigation Service (abbreviated as STT, Lithuanian: Specialiųjų tyrimų tarnyba) is the main law enforcement institution in Lithuania to combat corruption. Other law enforcement institutions also play a major role in combating corruption. In particular, the Financial Crime Investigation Service (abbreviated as FNTT, Lithuanian: Finansinių nusikaltimų tyrimo tarnyba) investigates money laundering and major financial fraud activities. National Audit Office of Lithuania (Lithuanian: Valstybės kontrolė) is the supreme audit institution which also supervises the lawfulness and effectiveness of management and use of state funds and resources.

In 2019, the Law on Protection of Whistleblowers entered force, providing legal protection as well as remunerations and other measures for those who report corruption or other infringements. Lobbying in Lithuania is regulated by the Lobbying Act 2001. According to the EU Members' Research Service report from 2016, Lithuania is one of the few EU countries which has a code of conduct and a mandatory register for lobbyists.

== Anti-corruption conventions and organizations ==
Lithuania participates in:

- The Group of States against Corruption (GRECO) (founding state; 1 May 1999)
- UN Convention against Transnational Organized Crime (ratified on 9 May 2002)
- Council of Europe Criminal Law Convention on Corruption (ratified on 8 March 2002)
- Council of Europe Civil Law Convention on Corruption (ratified on 17 January 2003)
- United Nations Convention against Corruption (ratified on 21 December 2006)
- International Anti-Corruption Academy (IACA) (ratified on 22 March 2013)
- OECD Anti-Bribery Convention (ratified on 16 May 2017)

== See also ==
- Special Investigation Service
- Police corruption in Lithuania
