= Special Investigation Service =

Lithuanian law enforcement agency

Special Investigation Service Specialiųjų Tyrimų Tarnyba
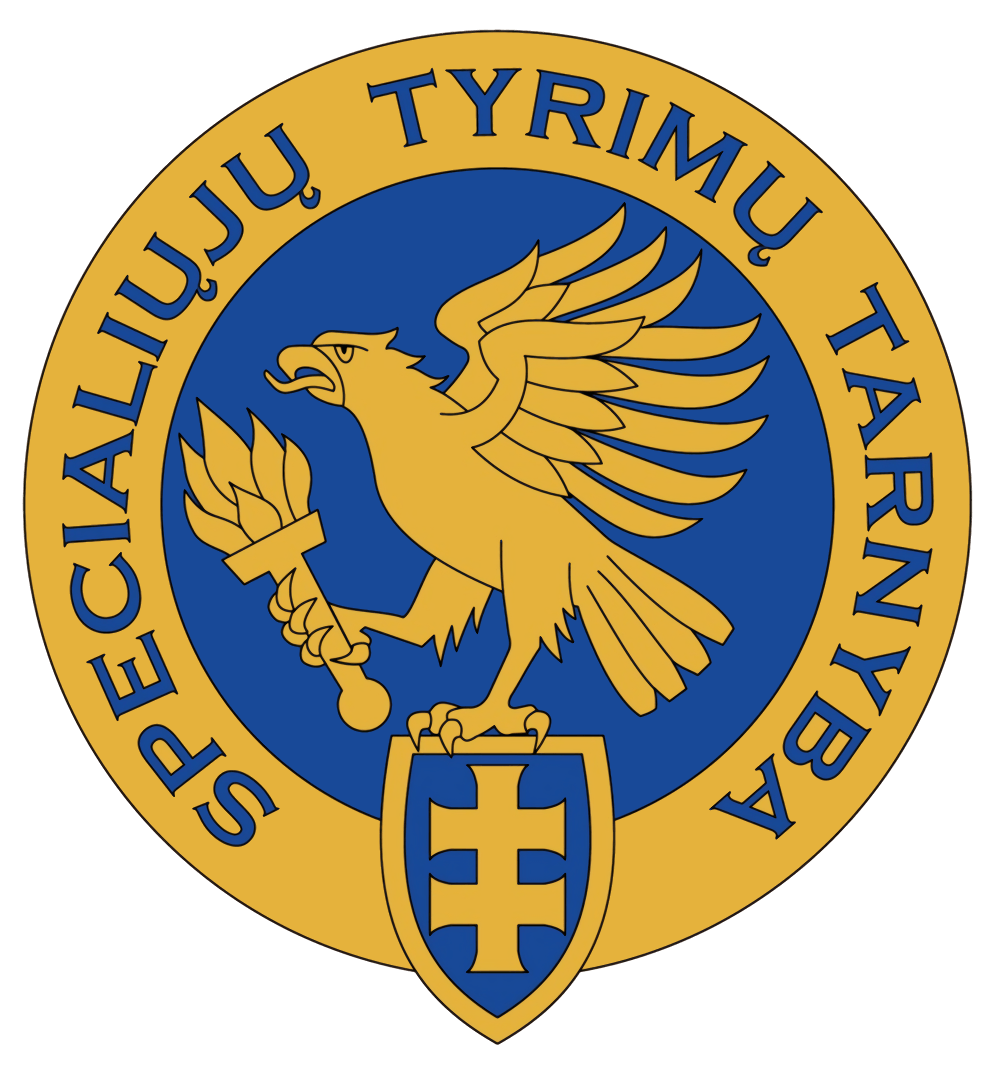
- Abbreviation: STT

Agency overview
- Formed: 18 February 1997; 29 years ago

Jurisdictional structure
- National agency: Lithuania
- Operations jurisdiction: Lithuania

Operational structure
- Headquarters: Vilnius
- Agency executives: Linas Pernavas, Director; Jovitas Raškevičius, 1st Deputy Director
- Departments: 5: Vilnius; Kaunas; Klaipėda; Šiauliai; Panevėžys

Website
- stt.lt

The Special Investigation Service or STT (Lithuanian: Specialiųjų tyrimų tarnyba) is a law enforcement institution in Lithuania serving under the Seimas and the President of Lithuania to combat corruption. With departments in Kaunas, Klaipėda, Šiauliai and Panevėžys, its objectives are to identify and investigate cases of corruption as well as to prevent it through education and introduction of improved procedures in the public sector.

== History ==
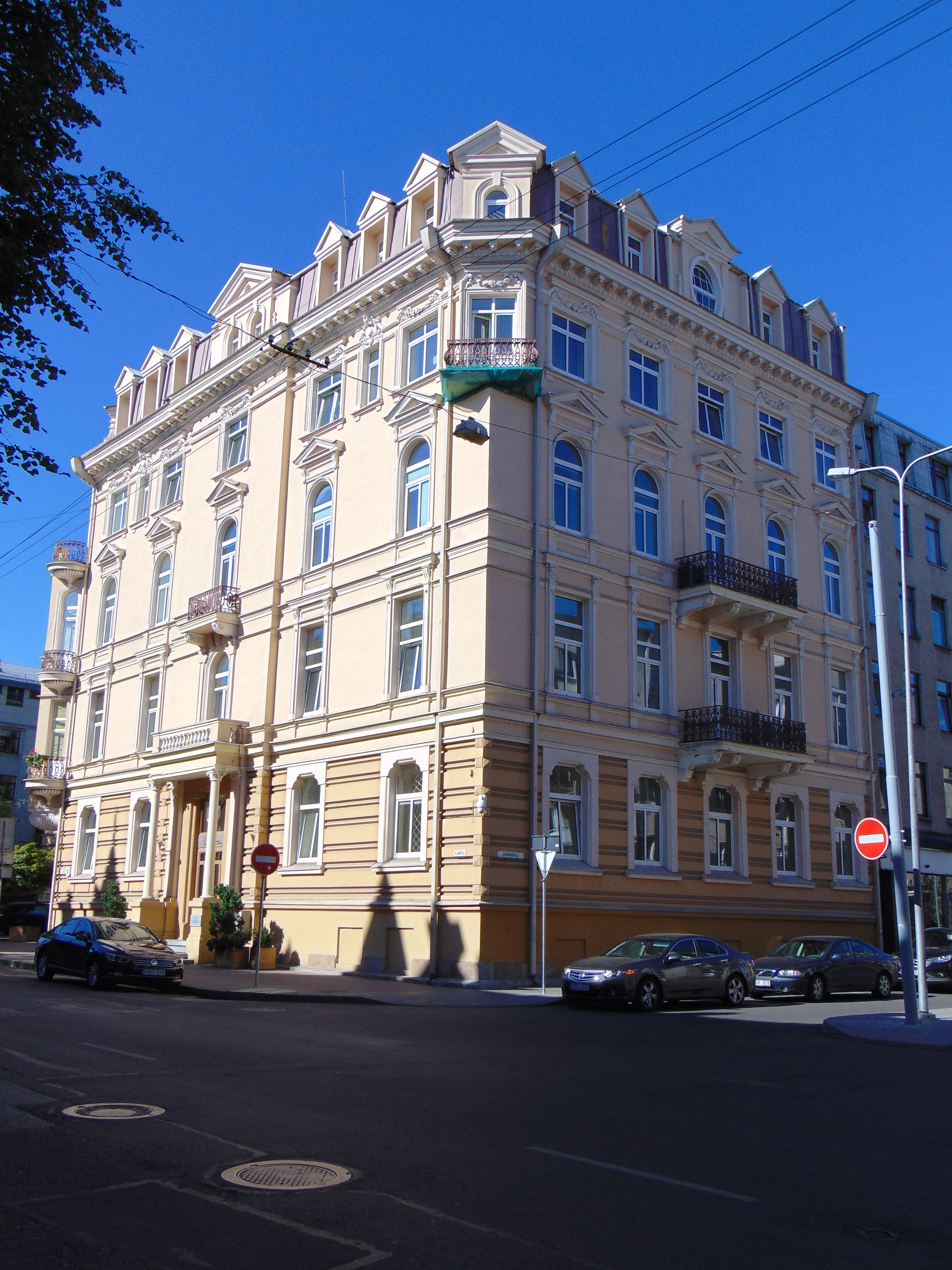
Headquarters of STT

With growing awareness of corruption in 1990s and several scandals (most notable of them was linked to the Prime Minister Adolfas Šleževičius), the Homeland Union won 1996 Lithuanian parliamentary election. The newly formed Lithuanian government, led by Gediminas Vagnorius, decided in 1997 to establish a separate organization for addressing the problem. It was done by government's decree.

The main task of the STT was detection and detention of corrupt officials (civil servants, judges and such).

The STT was accordingly established and for its first several years was overseen by the Ministry of the Interior. In May 2000, it came under the direct oversight of the President and Seimas.

Since 2008, the STT started bills' review.

== See also ==
- Anti-corruption
- Corruption in Lithuania
