= Multinational Monitor =

Defunct magazine covering corporate accountability and related topics

- Categories: Business magazines
- Frequency: Bimonthly
- Founder: Ralph Nader
- Founded: 1980
- Final issue: May/June 2009
- Company: Essential Information
- Country: USA
- Based in: Washington, D.C.
- Language: English
- Website: www.multinationalmonitor.org
- ISSN: 0197-4637
- OCLC: 644110798

The Multinational Monitor was a bimonthly magazine founded by Ralph Nader in 1980. It was published by Essential Information. The magazine was formerly published on a monthly basis. Although its primary focus was on the analysis of corporations, it also published articles on labor issues and occupational safety and health, the environment, globalization, privatization, the global economy, and developing nations.

The headquarters of the magazine was in Washington DC. It was a non-profit and advertising-free publication.

The last issue (according to the magazine's website) had a cover date of May/June 2009; this magazine may now be permanently defunct, though the website still contains a very thorough archive of past issues.

== Recurring features ==
=== 10 Worst Corporations ===
Since 1992 Multinational Monitor published an annual index recapping the activities and policies of ten corporations who demonstrated particularly egregious behavior.

=== Lawrence Summers Memorial Award ===
Each issue declared the bimonthly recipient of the Lawrence Summers Memorial Award, an award given in satirical honor of Lawrence Summers, the Secretary of the Treasury under Bill Clinton and later President of Harvard University, given to companies that "take extraordinary leaps to justify unethical practices." The award referred to the infamous Summers memo written by Summers' aide Lant Pritchett in 1991, when Summers was the World Bank's Chief Economist. The memo advocated transferring toxic waste and pollution from developed countries to least developed countries. (Summers later stated the memo was meant to be satire.)

== See also ==
- Corporate crime
- Criticisms of corporations
- List of corporate scandals
- Multinational corporation
