= Allegory of the Good and Bad Judge =

Fresco by the Master of Monsaraz-Beja

- O Bom e o Mau Juiz (Portuguese)
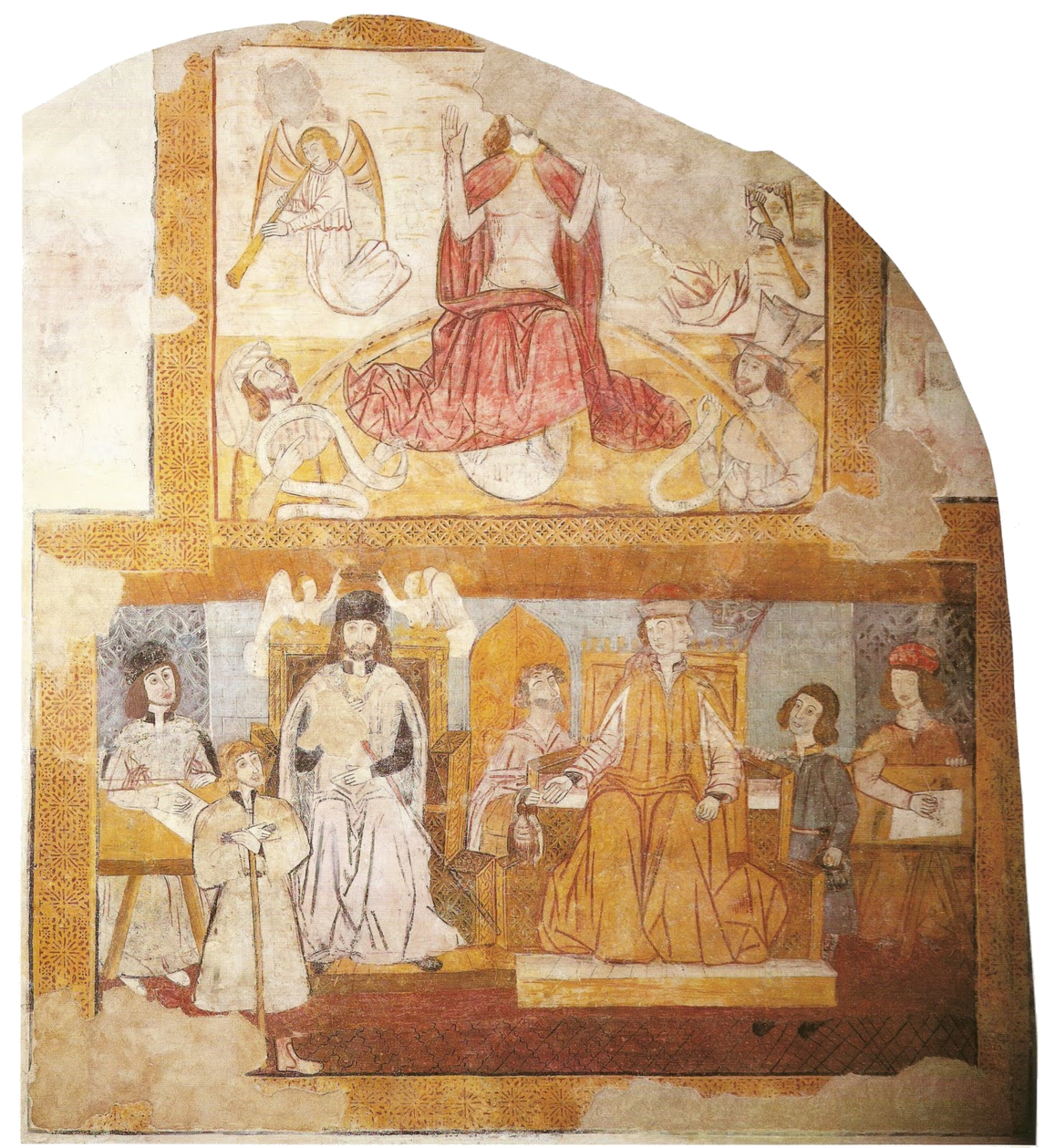
- Artist: Master of Monsaraz-Beja
- Year: c. 15th century
- Medium: Fresco
- Subject: Allegorical depictions of earthly justice and corruption
- Dimensions: 337 cm × 306 cm (133 in × 120 in)
- Location: Reguengos de Monsaraz, Portugal

The Good and the Bad Judge is a c. 15th-century fresco panel decorating the audience chamber of the old town hall of the municipality of Reguengos de Monsaraz, a medieval town situated in the south of Portugal, near the border with Spain. The distinctiveness of its iconography makes it a unique and rare artwork in the context of European Renaissance painting.

It was inadvertently discovered during renovation work in 1958, having been concealed behind a wall. Because little historical documentation regarding the work exists, there has been speculation about its intended iconographic meaning; the most widely accepted theory is that it is an allegory of divine and earthly justice. Though its authorship remains unknown, it has been attributed to the "Master of Monsaraz-Beja", who was active in the region between the late 15th and the early 16th century, and to whom are also attributed the frescoes in the Hermitage of Saint Andrew (Ermida de Santo André), in Beja.

The important art historian Túlio Espanca called this fresco an "extraordinary masterpiece", "unique in its profane theme" in the country. Some critics have drawn parallels between The Good and the Bad Judge, and Ambrogio Lorenzetti's The Allegory of Good and Bad Government (1338–9) in Siena's Palazzo Pubblico, and also Giotto's Scrovegni Chapel frescoes, namely the figures of Justice and Injustice (c. 1305), and Hans Holbein's famous Danse Macabre woodcuts (1526).

Recent insights link the painting to Diogo Lopes Rebelo's treatise De Republica Gubernanda per Regem (1496), underlying ethical and moral principles in government, dedicated to King Manuel I.

== Description ==
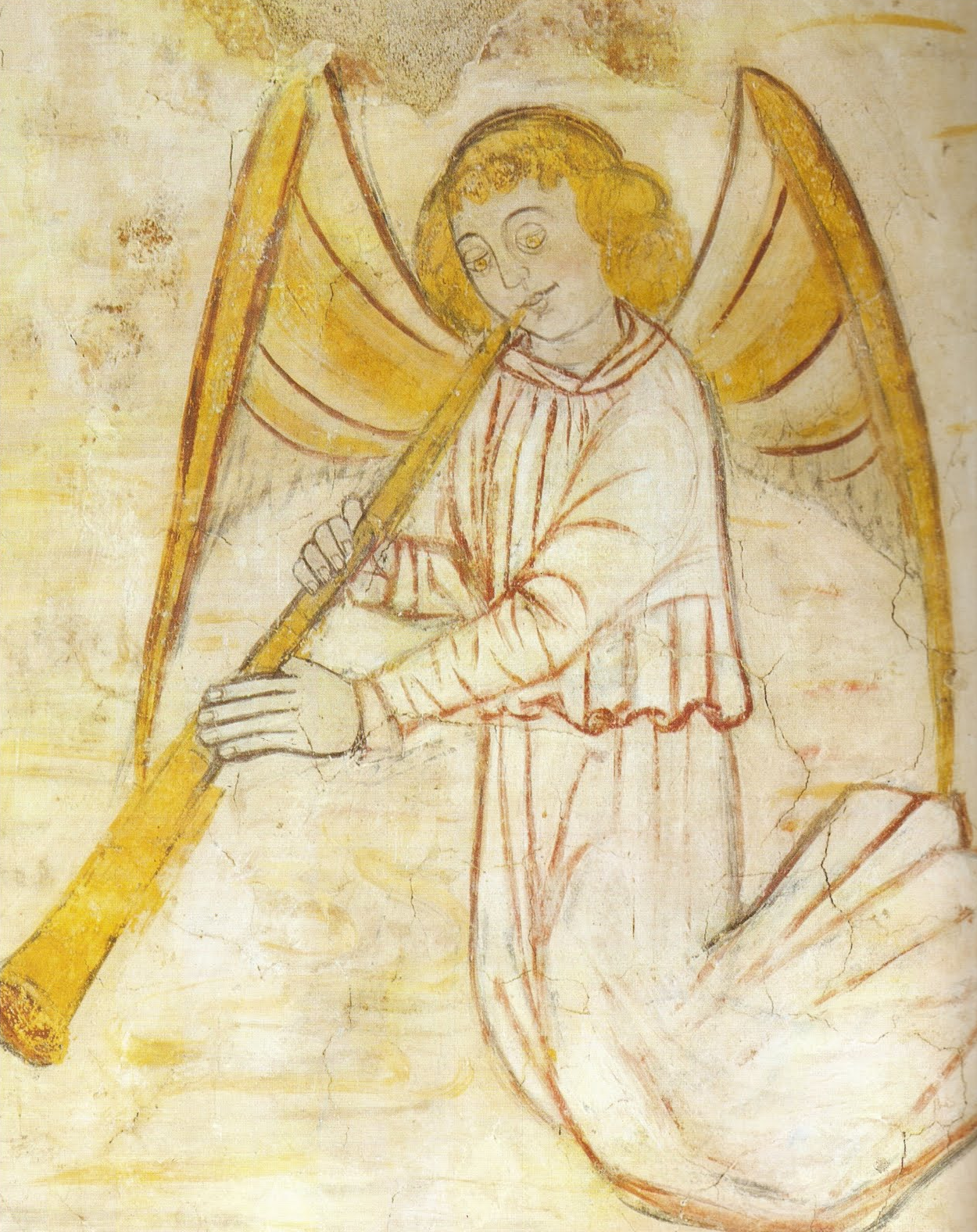
Detail of one of the trumpeting angels in the upper panel

The composition comprises two panels, of apparently distinct but complementary narratives. The two panels are framed by a decorative Moorish-inspired bar, which makes it resemble an illumination. What seem to be traces of a heraldic device can be seen on each side of the painting, probably the arms of the House of Braganza or the royal coat of arms.

In the upper scene, Christ as the Pantocrator in robes of red and with His feet resting on a globe with a Gothic caption reading "UROPA", is flanked by two prophets, each holding a phylactery twisted in the shape of the letters Alpha and Omega. He is also flanked by two trumpeting angels.

The lower scene depicts a trial with two judges: the "Good Judge" to the left, and the "Bad Judge" to the right, both seated on wooden and richly-crafted Gothic thrones. The Good Judge is seated facing the viewer directly, wearing robes of great sobriety (a white houppelande over a dark doublet and matching cap) and holding steady the red staff of the old municipal courts; he seems to be acquitting a man dressed in white. The Bad Judge, wearing showy robes of orange and a red fur-lined cap and holding a broken red staff, is depicted as having two faces and is being approached by two men in the act of bribery: the man to the right (a rico homem) takes gold coins from a coin purse, and the man to the left (a villein) offers the judge a pair of partridges.

While the Bad Judge's conduct is influenced by the Devil, who seems to be whispering in the judge's ear and rests his claw on top of the judge's shoulder, the Good Judge is being crowned by two angelic figures, Justice and Mercy, according to the medieval symbolism. The scene is flanked by two corregedores, each beside each of the judges, and in matching clothes.

== History ==
The old Town Hall and Courthouse (the medieval domus municipalis) of the town of Monsaraz was first built around the second quarter of the 14th century, at some time during the reigns of King Dinis and Afonso IV. It was built after the village was granted its first Charter in 1276 and had begun to expand and develop. Until it was built, public acts had been conducted in the churchyard of the Gothic Church of Santa Maria da Lagoa (demolished and later rebuilt in the 16th century).

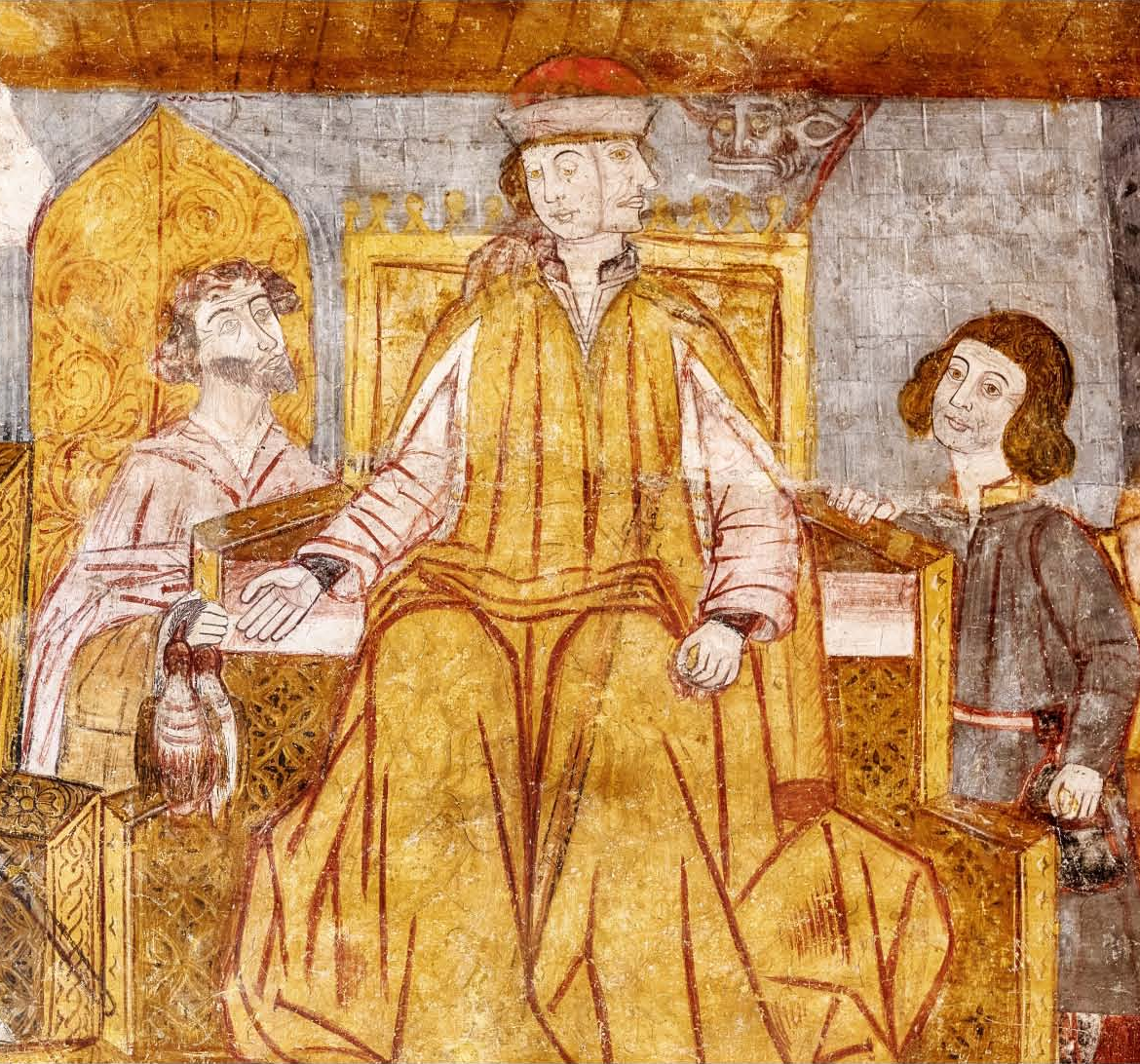
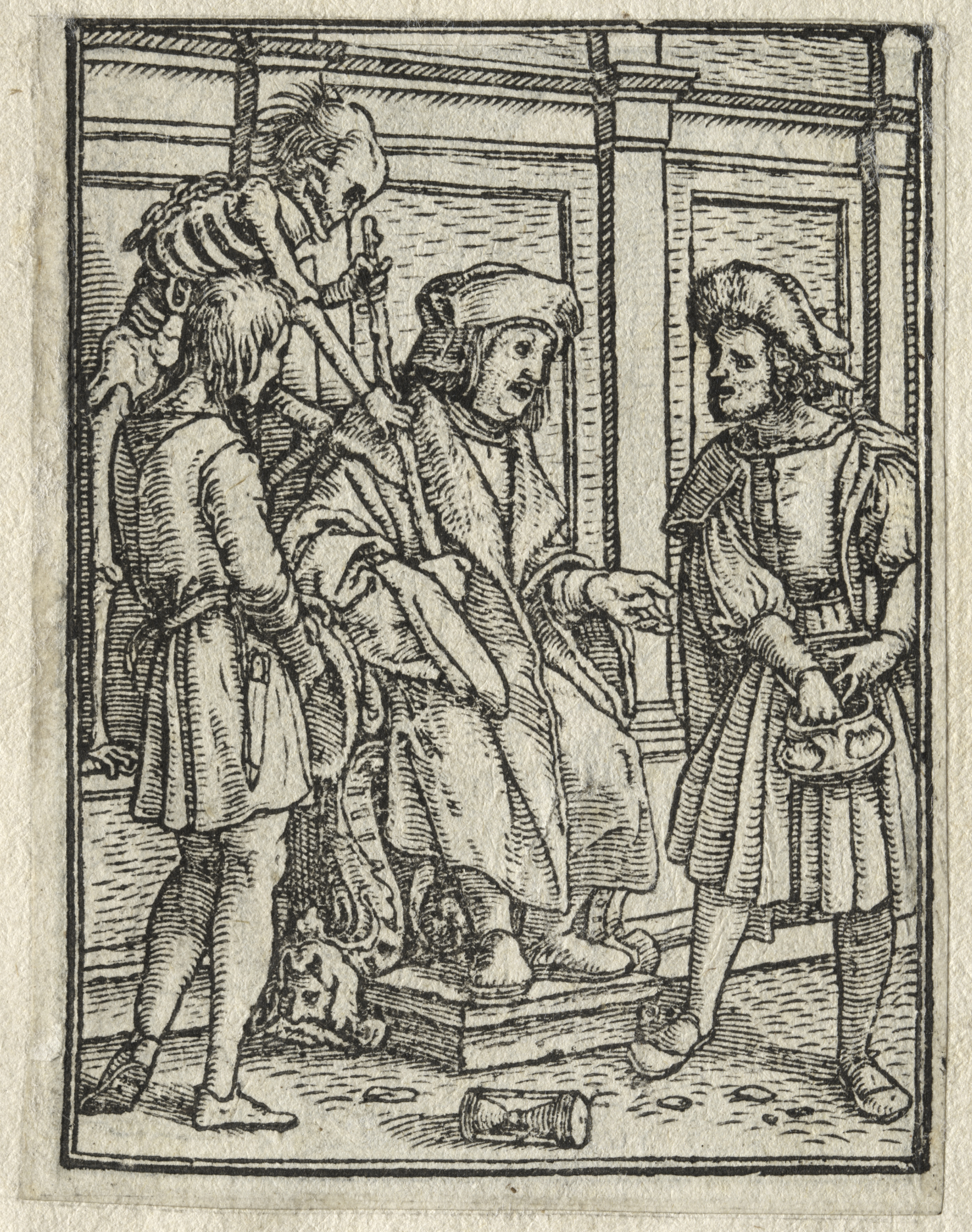
The corrupt judge being bribed is represented in a similar fashion in Hans Holbein's famous woodcut designs for his Danse Macabre series (1526).

The old Town Hall seems to have been rebuilt several times since its initial construction, although several original medieval elements can still be identified, such as the pointed arch on the entrance, the twinned arch windows, and the ribbed vaults. In the late 15th or early 16th century, the structure was also modified to hold a public jail, in accordance with the instructions of King John II. The fresco shows signs of having been mutilated, but it is unclear when. Some scholars suggest that it took place sometime during the reign of King Manuel I (r. 1495–1521), coinciding with the construction of a new dome, but more recent critics find it unlikely that the figures of Jesus Christ and of the heraldic achievement of the powerful House of Braganza (which counted Monsaraz among its many dominions) would be deliberately defaced during the 16th century. Instead, it has since been proposed that the mutilation was caused by the 1755 Lisbon earthquake, which is known to have damaged the building.

When the town hall was rebuilt, what was left of the fresco (because it is possibly the remaining fraction of a larger composition) was safeguarded behind a new wall constructed for this purpose. It remained hidden and forgotten until it was fortuitously discovered in the week of 6 to 11 October 1958 while the building, then the seat of the town's parish council, underwent repair and expansion. From that date until 1997, the fresco was subject to a number of restoration interventions for the consolidation of the mortar and paint layers, cleaning, and removal of overpainting.

In 1991, Lima de Freitas painted a modern version of The Good and the Bad Judge, for the Montemor-o-Novo Courthouse. This modern painting is both a visual homage to the medieval work and is inscribed with the words "An Homage to the Unknown Painter who, in 15th-century Monsaraz, painted the Good and the Bad Judge".

The building was converted to a museum, the "Museum of the Fresco" (Museu do Fresco), with The Good and the Bad Judge as its main attraction on 13 July 2012.
