= Professional courtesy =

Etiquette between members of the same profession

Professional courtesy generally refers to the etiquette extended between members of the same profession. The concept of professional courtesy is believed to have originated within the ancient practice of medicine whereby physicians provided services to other physicians without charge. However, the philosophy does not necessarily involve the same courtesy across all professions, nor is professional courtesy a mandated privilege, but is freely given at the discretion of the party extending the courtesy.

While the etiquette is not limited to physicians, the medical profession is likely the oldest and best-known one for having such a longstanding practice among its members. Some other well-known groups that have some form of professional courtesy are attorneys, performing artists, and law enforcement officers.

Within the law enforcement community, the phrase describes standard operational etiquette and coordination between agencies. However, it is also widely used to describe informal leniency, such as officers overlooking minor traffic violations committed by colleagues. At the most severe end of the spectrum, critics and researchers have highlighted the practice as a euphemism for broader departmental misconduct and corruption.

The phrase may also describe the ethical conduct of lawyers towards each other. A well-known American joke, versions of which date to the 1870s, revolves around sharks or wolves extending (or not extending) "professional courtesy" to lawyers.

== In medicine ==
In 1803, Thomas Percival wrote a classic essay on medical ethics that endorsed complimentary professional care to “All members of the profession, including apothecaries as well as physicians and surgeons, together with their wives and children, should be attended gratuitously.” In 1847, the American Medical Association's Code of Ethics similarly endorsed waiving charges for services to other physicians and their families, This is likely the first modern-day documentation of the philosophy.

Among physicians, it has been historically traditional to provide medical care at no or reduced cost to physician colleagues and their immediate family members. The original purpose of this practice was to discourage physicians from treating themselves and members of their own families. The custom dates back to Hippocrates, well before physicians had attained middle-class incomes. However, in the United Kingdom for example, there is no law against doctors treating family members a bonus of this is that it avoids questions of objectivity and the danger of emotional attachment colouring assessment and treatment. However, physicians regularly providing free or reduced-rate services as professional courtesy must remain mindful in an age of copays, insurance-only billing, and referrals, as the practice can run afoul of the law under some circumstances or redundant in countries which offer universal healthcare.

In 1994, the American Medical Association issued a Code of Medical Ethics Opinion advising that free-of-charge and reduced-rate services were not an ethical requirement, and that physicians should use their own judgment when deciding to extend such professional courtesy.

== In law enforcement ==
The term has been used to refer to the practice by law enforcement officers allowing other officers to engage in traffic violations and some crimes without being reported or arrested.

Some US states (such as California) issue confidential license plates to employees in law enforcement, and other public officials. The plates keep identities and addresses anonymous, allowing employees the inadvertent ability to travel on tollways without charge. Even serious offenses such as drunk driving are subject to professional courtesy discretion, and federal law assists in the process by exempting police officers and firefighters from a federal law that requires truck drivers to be blood-tested after an accident.

Some police unions offer law enforcement employees the purchase of a courtesy card that they can give to friends and family to produce at a traffic stop to identify them as family member. Critics of the ethical actions of police officers purport that where an ordinary member of the public would get a ticket, this notification card will lead the officer to overlook any violations of the law the person may have made and tell them to go on their way.

== In theater ==
Until the 1960s, it was customary for theater management to admit members of Actors Equity and other members of the profession to Broadway shows for free. This practice continues in the Off-Off-Broadway world, where members of Equity must be admitted free of charge to any Showcase production in which there is a member of the union in the cast if there are seats left at curtain time. This applies as well to bona fide producers, directors, and casting directors, who do not have to wait until showtime to be seated.
