= List of companies convicted of felony offenses in the United States =

This is a list of corporations that have pleaded guilty to, no contest to, or been convicted of a felony offense or multiple felonies in a state or federal court within the United States, and not had the conviction(s) overturned on appeal.

== Companies convicted of felonies in the United States ==
- Archer Daniels Midland
- BAE Systems, pleaded guilty to conspiring to defraud the US by impairing and impeding its lawful functions, to make false statements about its Foreign Corrupt Practices Act (FCPA) compliance program, and to violate the Arms Export Control Act (AECA) and International Traffic in Arms Regulations (ITAR).
- Bankers Trust
- BP, pleaded guilty to 11 counts of felony manslaughter.
- British Airways, pleaded guilty for price fixing.
- Daiwa Bank
- F. Hoffmann-La Roche
- General Electric
- Hoechst AG
- HSBC, pleaded guilty to 4 federal felony counts related to drug laundering for Mexican and Colombian drug cartels.
- International Paper
- JPMorgan Chase admitted in 2014 to its first two felony counts with the U.S. Department of Justice for facilitating Bernie Madoff's Ponzi scheme by providing banking services to him for decades without filing the legally-required Suspicious Activity Reports. The bank shared its suspicion with U.K. regulators that Madoff was running a Ponzi scheme but failed to mention it to regulators in the United States. Over the next six years, JPMorgan Chase would admit to three more criminal felony counts while keeping the same Chairman and CEO, Jamie Dimon, in place. (ref 1.1)
- Louisiana Pacific
- Pfizer, pleaded guilty to a felony violation of the Food, Drug and Cosmetic Act for misbranding Bextra with the intent to defraud or mislead.
- PG&E
- Samsung, pleaded guilty to price-fixing.
- Sears, Roebuck & Company, pleaded guilty to 1 count of fraud.
- The Trump Organization, convicted of tax fraud, scheming to defraud, conspiracy, and falsifying business records.
- Tyson Foods
- Volkswagen, pleaded guilty to 3 criminal felonies related to its emissions scandal.
- Waste Management, Inc
- The Boeing Company, pleaded guilty to one count of conspiracy to defraud the United States. This charge is directly related to the company’s role in the 737-max crashes that killed 346 individuals.
