= Vicarious liability (criminal) =

Legal principle

The legal principle of vicarious liability applies to hold one person liable for the actions of another when engaged in some form of joint or collective activity.

== History ==
Before the emergence of states which could bear the high costs of maintaining national policing and impartial court systems, local communities operated self-help systems to keep the peace and to enforce contracts. Until the thirteenth century, one of the institutions that emerged was an involuntary collective responsibility for the actions committed by one of the group. This was formalised into the community responsibility system (CRS) which was enforced by a fear of loss of community reputation and of retaliation by the injured community if the appropriate compensation was not paid. In some countries where the political system supported it, collective responsibility was gradually phased out in favour of individual responsibility. In Germany and Italy, collective systems were in operation as late as the sixteenth century.

While communities were relatively small and homogeneous, CRS could work well, but as populations increased and merchants began to trade across ever wider territories, the system failed to match the emerging societies' needs for more personal accountability and responsibility. In England, Henry I allowed London to opt out of the CRS and to appoint a sheriff and justices in 1133, and between 1225 and 1232, Henry III assured the merchants of Ypres that none of them "will be detained in England nor will they be partitions for another's debts".

Nevertheless, the idea of imposing liability on another despite a lack of culpability never really disappeared and courts have developed the principle that an employer can incur liability for the acts and omissions of an employee if committed by the employee in the course of employment and if the employer has the right to control the way in which the employee carries out his or her duties (respondeat superior). The imposition of vicarious liability in these circumstances has been justified on the following grounds:

- Exercise of control: If penalties are serious enough, it is assumed that rational employers will take steps to ensure that employees avoid injuring third parties. On the other hand, rational employers may choose to rely on independent contractors for risky operations and processes.
- Risk spreading: Many consider it socially preferable to impose the cost of an action on a person connected to it, even if a degree removed, rather than on the person who suffered injury or loss. This principle is also sometimes known as the "deep pocket" justification.
- Internalizing the social costs of activities: The employer usually (though not always) passes on the cost of compensating injury or loss to the customers and clients. As a result, the private cost of the product or service will better reflect its social cost.

These justifications may work against one another. For example, insurance will increase the ability to do risk spreading, but will reduce incentives for the exercise of control.

== Modern vicarious liability ==
The general rule in criminal law is that there is no vicarious liability. This reflects the general principle that crime is composed of both an actus reus (the Latin tag for "guilty act") and a mens rea (the Latin tag for "guilty mind") and that a person should only be convicted if they are directly responsible for causing both elements to occur at the same time (see concurrence). Thus, the practice of holding one person liable for the actions of another is the exception and not the rule in criminal law.

=== Vicarious liability in English law ===
The primary exception arises through statutory interpretation where the verb used to define the action in the actus reus is both the physical action of the employee and the legal action of the employer. For example, the activity of "driving" is purely a physical activity performed by the person behind the wheel. But when a cashier takes money as payment for goods, this is only the physical activity of selling. For goods to be sold, the owner of the goods must pass legal title to those goods. In default, the customer would commit the actus reus of theft. So the owner sells the goods at the same time that the employee takes the money. Similarly, only the holder of rights can grant a licence to another or permit another to do something that would otherwise have been unlawful. The verbs "possess", "control" and use may also have dual relevance depending on the context. Many of these are strict liability or regulatory offences, but the principle has been used to impose liability on a wide range of activities undertaken in a business or commercial environment.

=== Vicarious liability in the United States ===
This is generally applied to crimes that do not require criminal intent, e.g., those that affect the public welfare but which do not require the imposition of a prison term. The principle is that in such cases, the public interest is more important than private interest, and so the vicarious liability is imposed to deter or to create incentives for employers to impose stricter rules and supervise more closely. In Commonwealth v. Koczwara, the defendant was the licensed operator of a tavern which was found to have supplied minors with alcohol. The offence became one of strict or absolute liability when applied vicariously because of the need to protect weak and vulnerable members of society, and the omission of words such as "knowingly", "willfully" or "intentionally" in some of the offences indicated a legislative intent to permit this eventuality. In Staples v United States, the defendant was initially convicted of being in possession of an unregistered machine gun. It was a rifle that had been modified for rapid fire, thereby putting it in violation of the National Firearms Act. The Supreme Court reversed and remanded the case. The majority held that the defendant needed actual knowledge about the nature of his weapon in order for him to be convicted. The dissenting opinion states that it was irrelevant that he did not know about the modification because statutes regulating dangerous weapons are public welfare statutes and can be interpreted to exclude the mens rea requirement of knowledge. Hence, as long as defendants know that they are dealing with a dangerous product or device that places them in a responsible relationship to the public, they should recognize that strict regulations are more likely and assume that the United States Congress would intend to place the burden on the defendant to ascertain at his peril whether his conduct comes within the inhibition of the statute.

The courts generally convict employers for the illegal conduct of their employees even though the employers had no knowledge and so were not at fault. But in State v. Guminga where a waitress served alcohol to a minor, the court found that the conviction of her employer violated the Due Process Clause and so was not constitutional under Minnesota law. Consequently, the defendant should only be given civil not criminal penalties. It is noted that this prohibition had been in force since 1905, which had given the legislature many years in which to reform the law. The majority rejected the argument of implied legislative intent. The issue of constitutionality in the form of a substantive due process clause requires a balancing of public interests and personal liberty. Although a statute making employers vicariously liable for their employee’s actions may serve the public interest by providing deterrence, the private interests affected (i.e. liberty, damaged reputation, etc.) outweigh the public interests, especially when there are alternative means to reach the same end of deterrence, say by civil fines or license suspension.

== See also ==
- Amnesty law
- Command responsibility
- Criminal law
- Universal jurisdiction
