= Corporate warfare =

Form of information warfare

Corporate warfare is a form of information warfare in which attacks on companies by other companies take place. Such warfare may be part of economic warfare and cyberwarfare, but can involve espionage, 'dirty' PR tactics, or physical theft. The intention is largely to destabilise or sink the value of the opposing company for financial gain, or to steal trade secrets from them.

== In fiction ==
In the science fiction genre of cyberpunk, corporations guard their data and hire individuals to break into the computer systems of their competitors. In the genre pioneered by William Gibson, power is largely in the hands of megacorporations, which often maintain their own private militaries and security forces and wage corporate warfare against each other.

== Cyber ==
According to Schwartau, companies are typically targeted by their competitors. Such warfare may include methods of industrial espionage, spreading disinformation, leaking confidential information and damaging a company's information systems.

Chris Rouland of the cybersecurity & cyberarms company Endgame, Inc., controversially advocated that private companies should be allowed to "hack back" against nations or criminals trying to steal their data. After a wave of high-profile attacks against US companies and government databases, a panel of experts assembled by the George Washington University Center for Cyber and Homeland Security said policies should be eased to allow "active defense" measures to deter hackers and did not recommend hacking back "because [they] don't want the cure to be worse than the disease". Relevantly, at the February 2017, RSA Conference Microsoft President Brad Smith stated that technology companies need to preserve trust and stability online by pledging neutrality in cyber conflict.

The dramatic increase in the use of the Internet for business purposes has exposed private entities to greater risks of cyberattacks. Garcia and Horowitz propose a game-theoretic approach that considers economic motivations for investment in Internet security and investigates a scenario in which firms plan for long-term security investment by considering the likelihood of cyber-attacks.

Botnets may be used to knock business competitors offline. They can be hired by corporations to disrupt the operation of competitors on the networks.

Low-grade corporate warfare is constantly being waged between technology giants by "patent trolls, insider blogs and corporate talking points".

Supply chain attacks in corporate warfare can be called supply chain interdiction.

The term may also refer to the privatization of warfare, mainly by the involvement of private military companies.

It has been speculated that the concept of "non-international armed conflict within the meaning of Article 3 GC I to IV" of the Fourth Geneva Convention would be wide enough to allow for covering "a renaissance of corporate warfare".

== Art ==
In 2016, a digital illustration series by the German Foreal design studio called "Corporate Warfare" visualized the power and impact of big brand corporations by branded torpedoes and atomic bombs. Dirk Schuster, cofounder of Foreal, states that "big corporations can have more power than governments, so we put them in a military context".

Sam Esmail, creator of the television series Mr. Robot, states that "the next world war won't be fought with nukes, but with information, economics and corporate warfare.

== See also ==
- Assassination market
- Decentralized autonomous organization
- Smart contract
- Private army
- Military–industrial complex
- Lawfare
- Patent war
- Defamation
- Corporatocracy
- Competition (economics)
- Industrial espionage
- Parallel construction
- Supply chain cyber security
- Proactive cyber defence
- Cyber self-defense § "Hacking back"
- Proxy war
- Evil corporation
- Apple Inc. v. Samsung Electronics Co.
- Yahoo! data breaches
- Sony Pictures hack
