= List of criminologists =

This is a list of notable social scientists that work in the field of criminology and criminal justice. Although some government agencies hire individuals with the title "Criminologist", a criminologist has a Ph.D. in Criminology or Criminal Justice. Since Criminology is an interdisciplinary field, individuals with a doctorate in economics, history, political science, philosophy, and sociology, but who publish scholarly articles and books in the field of criminology and criminal justice, are also considered criminologists. Although forensic scientists may have an understanding of criminology and criminal justice, they are not criminologists.

== A ==
- Abgrall, J.M
- Mimi Ajzenstadt (born 1956), Israeli criminologist; President of the Open University of Israel
- Athens, L

== B ==
- Baldry, A.C.
- Beccaria, C
- Becker, G
- Becker, H.S
- Bentham, J
- Beto, G.
- Blumstein, A
- Body-Gendrot, S
- Braithwaite, J
- Brown, L.P
- Burgess, E

== C ==
- Clinard, Marshall B.
- Cloward, R
- Cohen, A.K
- Cohen, S

== D ==
- del Carmen, A
- Durkheim, E
- Duwe, G
- Densley, J

== E ==
- Eysenck, H

== F ==
- Ferri, E
- Fox, J.A

== H ==
- Hemenway, D
- Husserl, E
- Heinrich, Edward O.
- Hirschi, Travis

== J ==
- Jesse, F.T
- Karuppannan Jaishankar

== K ==
- Kates, D
- Kelling, G.L
- Kleck, G

== L ==
- Lacassagne, A
- Latimer, C
- Levin, J
- Locard, E
- Lombroso, C
- Lott, J

== M ==
- Mazerolle, P
- McGill, Frances G.
- Merton, R.K

== N ==
- Newburn, T

== O ==
- Ohlin, L

== P ==
- Park, R.E
- Persson, L.G.W

== Q ==
- Quetelet, A

== R ==
- Reiner, Robert
- Reiss, A
- Ross, J.I.

== S ==
- Semerari, A
- Sherman, L.W
- Sutherland, E
- Sutton, M

== T ==
- Taylor, I

== V ==
- Valle, I.L
- Veringa, G

== W ==
- Wembi, S
- Wilson, D
- Wilson, J.Q
- Wilson, W.J
- Wootton, B

== Y ==
- Young, J

== See also ==
- List of sociologists
