= Marshall B. Clinard =

American sociologist who specialized in criminology

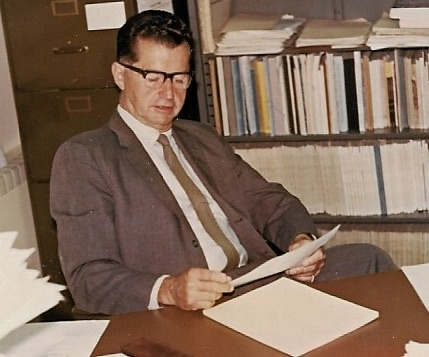
- Marshall B. Clinard in 1967
- Born: November 12, 1911; Boston
- Died: May 30, 2010 (aged 98); Santa Fe, New Mexico
- Occupation: Sociologist

Academic work
- Discipline: Criminology
- Institutions: University of Wisconsin
- Main interests: Black market, White-collar crime, Deviant behavior, International sociology

Marshall Barron Clinard (November 12, 1911 – May 30, 2010) was an American sociologist who specialized in criminology. Criminological studies spanned across his entire career, from an examination of the Black Market during World War II to much more general treatments of white collar crime. His 1957 textbook Sociology of Deviant Behavior (co-authored with Robert F. Meier starting in 1979 with the 5th edition) is now in its 15th edition. In addition to studies within the United States, Clinard did research in Sweden, India, Uganda and Switzerland: supported, respectively, by the Fulbright Program, the Ford Foundation, the Rockefeller Foundation and the U. S. National Science Foundation.

== Academic life ==
After graduating prep school in 1928 from Governor Dummer Academy in Newbury, Massachusetts, Clinard attended San Diego State University for two years, then transferred to Stanford University where in 1932 he earned a bachelor's degree in anthropology. Finding few teaching opportunities in anthropology at the depth of the depression, he switched to Sociology and continued at Stanford as a graduate student.

As an undergraduate he had become aware of Edwin Sutherland's 1924 book Criminology and, upon completion of his M.A. degree in 1935, he moved to the University of Chicago to work with Sutherland as a Ph.D. student. Clinard not only gained a theoretical understanding of the way people become engaged in criminal behavior (including Sutherland's theory of differential association) but also learned qualitative research techniques while working under Sutherland, Herbert Blumer and (after Sutherland moved to Indiana University in 1935) Ernest Burgess under whose guidance Clinard completed his Ph.D. dissertation.

In 1937, with his coursework requirements met, he took his first teaching job at the University of Iowa and did research on property-crime offenders who were sentenced during the 26-month period from July 1938 through August 1940 to the Iowa Men's Reformatory. He surveyed 200 offenders to quantify sociological variables, as influenced by whether the offender grew up in a rural, village and urban setting. And, for 60 rural or village offenders he quantitatively and qualitatively examined the roles of geographic mobility, gangs or associates, and criminal self conception.

=== Black market crime ===
In July 1941, with the data for his dissertation in hand, he moved his family to Washington D.C., working first as a statistician in the Bureau of the Census, then, from December 1942 to September 1945, chief of the Analysis and Reports Branch of the Office of Price Administration (OPA). The OPA work provided information he used in a 1946 publication, and led in 1952 to publication of a book about the black market. Clinard argued that the black market is not an outgrowth of gangster or marginal businesses. The political scientist Marver Bernstein faulted the book for lack of detailed discussion of the relationship between the OPA and the War Food Administration but found to be significant Clinard's statistics suggesting that "violators were not chiefly recruited from persons of recent immigrant background." In 2010, an entry in the Encyclopedia of Criminological Theory by professor of Criminal Justice Kip Schlegel praised Clinard's documentation of OPA action, using methods which are "a model for ... studying the nature and enforcement of white-collar crime."

In 1952, the year the Black Market crime book was published, Clinard expanded on this study by discussing aspects of societal corruption in a variety of domains: political, individual, sports, etc. In a cover story of the Sunday New York Times magazine he demonstrated that these problems in the U.S. were occurring amid increasing levels of mobility, urbanization, individualism and materialism, and gave the problems a historical and sociological context.

At the end of World War II he took a position for a short time at Vanderbilt University then went to the University of Wisconsin for the bulk of his career.

=== International: Sweden & India ===
A 1954-1955 sabbatical year in Sweden provided an opportunity to deepen his Ph.D. research about the relationship between the locale where Iowan property crime offenders were raised and characteristics of their criminal activity. He replicated the earlier study in Swedish areas with the same mix of rural, village and urban upbringings but in a population much more homogeneous with regard to race, religion and culture. Both this study and a 1954 replication study in Iowa itself confirmed many of the original findings, but found that, unlike Clinard's study during the early 1940s, by the mid-1950s in Iowa (and also in mid-1950s Sweden) rural offenders did not frequently leave the community in which they lived to commit crimes. Furthermore, the two follow-up studies found less tendency than the original research did for city-raised property offenders to move progressively toward more serious and complex property crimes over time.

In 1958 Clinard started a more-extensive series of leaves-of absence from the University of Wisconsin: two years in 1958-1960 and another year in 1962–1963. Supported by the Ford Foundation, Clinard served as resident consultant to an Indian government program to promote self help as a means to change the slums of Delhi. He played a consultant role within a program launched in 1958 by the government of Delhi, India. The program became a department of the Delhi city government (alongside departments of health, sanitation, education, etc.) under the name "Department of Urban Community Development." B. Chatterjee, a social worker who for the previous ten years was executive secretary of the Indian Conference of Social Work was named Project Director. As part of the first two years' activity, Chatterjee and Clinard wrote a detailed description of their organizational procedures. The idea was not to view slums from an economic point of view, but rather to foster establishment of community associations, encourage local residents toward leadership, inculcate pride, and tackle civic services on an extremely local level. Starting with two community organizers and six small neighborhoods and expanding to cover (still) only a small portion of the slums of Delhi, the first question asked at an initial group meeting was "What problems do you think the people in this area could solve for themselves?" Some interviewers sensed that this might be the first time that a resident had been asked what residents themselves could do to solve problems. In 1966 Clinard published a book which showed how the Indian effort fit within the international context and described, inter alia, how the smallest of neighborhoods in Delhi (vikas sabhas of ca. 25 families) fit into larger vikas mandals of typically around a thousand people or more people and, in some cases, even larger areas consisting of multiple vikas mandals.

=== Deviant Behavior, Anomie & Criminological typology ===
Clinard first published the textbook The Sociology of Deviant Behavior in 1957, followed by two or three further editions each decade since then. Starting with the 5th edition (1979) Robert F. Meier has co-authored this book, and in 2016 the 15th edition appeared. Earlier, elements of Clinard's contentions about deviant behavior, as well as the phrase "deviant behavior" itself, appeared in a work about criminal behavior.

At the 1962 annual meeting of the American Sociological Association Clinard chaired a session titled Social Deviance and Disorganization where each of five sociologists presented a talk titled "_____ and Anomie: A Critique" and a sixth talk titled "Summary and Comments" was given by Robert K. Merton. The Free Press published a book edited from contents of the session. Milton L. Barron reviewed it, saying that the book reflects the importance of anomie theory to the analysis of social problems and that the theory of anomie vies with concepts such as "social forces, consciousness of kind, culture, primary and secondary groups, social disorganization, and differential association" and that the combination of Clinard's opening essay "The theoretical implications of anomie and deviant behavior" and Merton's concluding essay "Anomie, anomia, and social interaction" provide a framework within which these theories can vie. Barron specifically recommends to students of crime and delinquency the treatments of gang delinquency by Short, of drug addiction by Lindesmith and Gagnon and of inebriety and alcoholism by Charles R. Snyder.

In 1967 Clinard and Richard Quinney, a Ph.D. student at University of Wisconsin–Madison in the late 1950s, published a book which proposed, in place of a legalistic or an individualistic classification of criminal behavior, a division of eight criminal behavior types characterized by sociological properties and based on a theory of crime. The eight types of criminal behavior (violent personal, occasional property, occupational, political, public order, conventional, organized and professional) are each described by Clinard and Quinney and the discussion is deepened using readings, numbering 35 in total. In 1973 a second edition with each type described in greater detail by Clinard and Quinney but with no readings was published and in 1994 a third edition was published with the addition of a third author, John Wildeman.

=== International: Uganda & Switzerland ===
In 1968 Clinard obtained a grant from the Rockefeller Foundation to teach and do research at Makerere University in Kampala and to help develop a program in deviant behavior and criminology. The grant also supported a doctoral student, Daniel Abbott. Together with a research staff they undertook a study of crime in Uganda, with emphasis on Kampala, and reported their research in a book which concluded that development often entails increased corruption in business and government and also tends to include an increase in crimes like armed robbery and auto theft, primarily by young under-trained males who have migrated to the city looking for work, but with little prospect for finding jobs, especially in the absence of relatives or friends in the city to help them adjust. Abbott's prior development experience in Latin America and Clinard's work in both developed and underdeveloped countries helped place this study in a wider geographic context. The attention on rural to city migration and on the role of slums is natural given the attention to these issues in Clinard's prior experience. The book has received attention from within Africa and beyond.

During 1973-1974 Clinard received support from the U. S. National Science Foundation to study crime in Switzerland. He confirmed that Switzerland's reputation for low crime is supported by the data and explored the sociological roots of this. Clinard showed that the level of conventional crime is lower in Switzerland than in other comparably affluent and industrialized urban societies. And, he bolstered this finding by using multiple independent comparisons with other countries, for example by showing that Swiss public concern with crime is low and only slowly increasing and by documenting a near-constancy of insurance rates for burglary and theft in Switzerland. Clinard mustered data (only available to a limited extent) on Swiss white-collar crime to argue that Switzerland is high in crime, when viewed from this perspective.

=== Corporate crime ===
Clinard and his students studied 1975 and 1976 federal data regarding administrative, civil, and criminal actions against the 582 largest publicly owned U. S. corporations. The results and methodology of the study are described in reports published by the ICPSR at the University of Michigan. The study, which was financed by a grant from the Law Enforcement Assistance Administration (LEAA) of the Department of Justice, found that although 40% of these corporations were not charged with any violation during the study's two-year duration the other 350 corporations were charged, on average 4.4 times each during 1975 and 1976. It was found that violations were more common in certain industries, especially the oil, pharmaceutical and motor vehicle industries, and that the more serious violations tended to fall in the domains of labor law and product quality. For the reissue of the Corporate Crime book in 2006, Clinard wrote a 35-page introduction which included analysis of the 1989 Exxon Valdez oil spill, the 2001 Enron and the 2002 WorldCom bankruptcies and the Tyco International scandal.

In 1983 Clinard based a book on corporate ethics on interviews with former middle managers, retired from positions in large corporations.

In 1990, Clinard published a book on corporate corruption with an emphasis on ethics, corporate abuse and impact on the democratic process.

== Personal life ==
Clinard was born on November 12, 1911, the first child of Gladys Edna (née Barron) Clinard and Andrew Marshall Clinard. His twin sisters Barbara and Bettie were born in 1920. Clinard said that the death of his father when he was 14 years old and his sisters were only five, and the loss of most of the family's money in the 1929 crash three years later, give him "a new role in the family" and "matured me beyond my years." A life-long love of travel and a fascination with previously unexperienced cultures developed as early as age 19 when he participated during the summer after his junior year at Stanford in the Chaco Canyon Field School under the guidance of Edgar Lee Hewett.

He met Ruth Mary Blackburn, from Olney, Illinois, at the University of Chicago where they both were graduate students: he in sociology, she in social work. They married in 1937 and had three children, Marsha Ruth, Lawrence Marshall and Stephen Andrew, born in Iowa City, Washington and Madison respectively. Ruth shared his love of travel, both domestic and international, including the four faculty-improvement leaves plus travel to West Africa and multiple trips, into their eighties, to France, India and Nepal among other destinations, to enjoy their love of nature, trekking and observing mankind. She participated in the production of all his books both through technical and content editing and through travel planning.

Upon his retirement in 1979 he and Ruth lived in Santa Fe until 1990 when Ruth's health occasioned a move to lower-elevation Santa Barbara. When Ruth died in 1999 Marshall moved back to Santa Fe and continued a life of writing and travel, marrying a former student, Arlen Westbrook. They bought a house in Santa Fe, traveled frequently until the end of his life, and with her help he continued writing, including a 35-page Introduction to a 2006 reissue of the Corporate Crime book and an article which included his understanding of how his career in criminology came about. He died at age 98 ½.

Clinard's sense of humor, sometimes devastatingly mordant, was often related to his career. For example, he dedicated his second book, about deviant behavior, "To my children, from whom I have learned a great deal" – a quote which gained notoriety when it was displayed in a Playboy magazine blurb. He loved to point out behavior stemming from self perception ("How old would you be if you didn't know your age?") and to be provocative, as in the toast he sometimes gave when among criminologists: "To more crime, for without it we would not be employed."

== A career in criminology ==
As he explained near the end of his life, his career as a sociologist and more specifically as a criminologist stemmed from both personal and academic factors. The personal factors include the maturity thrust on him by early family losses and his mother's admonition that he not become a businessman. The academic factors include concrete ones, for example his choice of Sociology over Anthropology because of greater employment opportunities, his seeing the preparations for hangings while leading student tours to Alcatraz and San Quentin as part of his criminology-course "reader" job at Stanford and similar tour-guide experiences in neighborhoods of Chicago during his Ph.D. studies.

In his perception, abstract factors were crucial in his choice of a career in criminology. When, early in his time in Chicago, fellow students labeled him as a "criminologist" (maybe based on his tour-guide role) he understood this labeling and his reaction to it as an example of George Herbert Mead's theory which Blumer labeled as Symbolic interactionism. And one part of his contact with Edwin Sutherland at Chicago was work assigned to Clinard as part of what eventually became Sutherland's book on white-collar crime. Thus began Clinard's life-long espousal of Sutherland's theory of Differential association and emphasis on white-collar and corporate crime.

From early in his career, Clinard was active in both quantitative and qualitative sociology. His Ph.D. dissertation and his first post-Ph.D. employment with the Bureau of the Census in Washington, D.C., exhibit a strong quantitative, statistical bent, and this contrasts with the role he played at the qualitative end of the spectrum among his colleagues at the University of Wisconsin, influenced by his contact with the qualitative approach to sociology which predominated at the University of Chicago.

== Awards ==
- 1971: Awarded the Edwin H. Sutherland Award by the American Society of Criminology.
- 1985: Awarded honorary degree "Docteur en Droit – Honoris Causa" by the Université de Lausanne (Switzerland).
- 1994: Awarded the Donald R. Cressey Award by the Association of Certified Fraud Examiners.
- 2009: Awarded the Gilbert Geis Lifetime Achievement Award by the White-Collar Crime Research Consortium at the National White Collar Crime Center.

== Books ==
- Clinard, Marshall B. (1952). The Black Market: A Study of White Collar Crime. Rinehart & Co.; after 1969 Patterson Smith.
- Chatterjee, B.; Clinard, Marshall B. (1961). Organizing Citizens' Development Councils (Vikas Mandals). Municipal Corporation of Delhi Department of Urban Community Development. p. 85.
- Clinard, Marshall B., ed. (1964). Anomie and Deviant Behavior: A Discussion and Critique. Free Press of Glencoe.
- Clinard, Marshall B. (1966). Slums and Community Development – Experiments in self help. Free Press.
- Clinard, Marshall B.; Quinney, Richard (1967). Criminal Behavior Systems, A Typology. Holt, Rinehart & Winston. OCLC 361731.
- Clinard, Marshall B.; Abbott, Daniel J. (1973). Crime in developing countries: a comparative perspective. Wiley. OCLC 591574.
- Clinard, Marshall B. (1978). Cities with Little Crime: The Case of Switzerland. Cambridge University Press. (or, partial access via Amazon)
- Clinard, Marshall B.; Yeager, Peter C. (1980). Corporate Crime. Free Press.
- Clinard, Marshall B. (1983). Corporate Ethics and Crime: The Role of Middle Management. SAGE Publications. ISBN 9780803919723.
- Clinard, Marshall B. (1990). Corporate Corruption:The Abuse of Power. Praeger.
- Clinard, Marshall B.; Meier, Robert F. (2016). Sociology of Deviant Behavior (15th ed.). (or, partial access via WorldCat/Google Books)
