= Criminal tradition =

Criminal tradition refers to the cultural transmission of criminal values, behaviors, and norms within certain communities. These traditions are often passed from one generation to the next, particularly in environments where crime has become normalized. Like customs in mainstream society, criminal traditions influence how individuals interact, make decisions, and view authority.

== Theories and development ==
This concept of a criminal tradition is very much associated with the sociological studies of Clifford R. Shaw and Henry D. McKay. They coined the concept of cultural transmission as a theory that showed that certain urban neighborhoods usually grow to develop these persistent patterns of behavior of crime. From this study, it has been found that such tradition continues even after population shifts by virtue of the social setting reinforcing these criminal values.

Edwin H. Sutherland's theory on differential association is among the major theories in this field. According to Sutherland, criminal behavior is acquired through social interaction. Thus, the criminal values of young people, for instance, are derived from associating with other people already possessing this belief. This theory underscored the teaching of criminal behavior rather than an inheritance of it from the home.

Research by Shaw and McKay on the concept of cultural transmission indicates that a criminal tradition or subculture does exist in areas of larger cities. According to their studies, criminal tradition arises and is maintained in areas of instability, and the values, norms, and behaviors of the participants in the criminal tradition are viewed as normal by these people.

== Population categories subject to criminal traditions ==
Criminal traditions are closest to adolescents and young people who are most likely to imitate the behavior of their social group with poor morality put down by neither individual authority. Rather, these traditions would be formed from group norms. This depersonalization makes them more effective, especially in closed settings such as correctional facilities or youth gangs. There it can become embedded in one's manner of daily life, making it difficult to rein in criminal behavior.

Researchers often differentiate between these two types of criminal traditions:

- Historical traditions: They came to us from the criminal environment of the distant past and transformed into modern ones, taking into account the conditions of life of society and the relations dominating in it;
- Contemporary Traditions: New traditions that have arisen and established in a criminal environment in modern conditions and have no analogues in the past.

At the same time, there is a transformation of existing criminal traditions and the emergence of new ones. The reason for this is the changes in the social, economic, legal and other spheres.

== World criminal tradition ==
Criminal traditions are also present in other parts of the world. For example, in South Africa, numbers gangs have their own set of rules and codes, which are passed down within the gang culture. These traditions influence not only the behavior of the members but also the ways in which gangs operate, both inside and outside of prison environments.

== Alternative opinions ==
Some researchers think that not everything is bad. Some subcultures may discourage behavior in the interest of order and cleanliness. A hygiene code that might otherwise be considered outside the law in certain communities-as in some prisons-enforces a mode of cleanliness that maintains sanitary standards in the living environment for inmates. Such factors prevent an easy view of all criminal traditions remaining antisocial or harmful.

== Russian criminal tradition ==
In Russian criminal tradition adherents of the criminal (criminal) tradition are characterized by active participation in the life of the "thieves' community"; Living on tangible assets obtained by criminal means; Propaganda of "thieves' customs and traditions, as well as criminal way of life; Compulsion to keep a word not only before the "brother", but also the criminal-criminal world; Organization of collection of "Obshchak" funds and control over their use; Guardianship and assistance to detainees and convicts, the so-called "vagabonds" and "honest prisoners"; Compliance with the decisions of "gatherings"; Demanding of "brotherhood" and control over their compliance; Organization of counteraction to state bodies.

== Sources ==
- Shaw, C. R., & McKay, H. D. (1942). Juvenile Delinquency and Urban Areas. University of Chicago Press.
- Sutherland, E. H. (1947). Principles of Criminology (4th ed.). J.B. Lippincott.
- CRIMINAL RUSSIA - ESSAYS ON CRIME IN THE SOVIET UNION, Author V. CHALIDZE, 1977
- A Sociological Technique in Clinical Criminology by Saul D Alinskiy
- Kapsis, R. E. (1978). RESIDENTIAL SUCCESSION AND DELINQUENCY A Test of Shaw and McKay’s. Theory of Cultural Transmission.
- Williams, F. P. III, & McShane, M. D. (Eds.). (2007). Criminological Theory: Selected Classic Readings.
- Tradition
