= Principles of Criminology =

1934 book on criminology

- Title page of the fourth edition
- Author: Edwin H. Sutherland and Donald R. Cressey
- Publisher: J. B. Lippincott
- Publication date: 1934

Principles of Criminology, written by Edwin H. Sutherland and Donald R. Cressey, is hailed as an authoritative work in the field of criminology. The first edition was published in 1934, although it was derived from a previous publication, Criminology (1924). The 1934 edition contained a paragraph claiming that crime is brought about by a conflict of behaviours that originate from different cultures. This was the seed of Sutherland's theory of differential association, which was fully developed in the fourth edition, published in 1947.

Further editions of the book were published after Sutherland's death in 1950 by Cressey and D. F. Luckenbill as co-authors.
