= Adam Raphael =

British journalist and author

Adam Eliot Geoffrey Raphael (born 22 April 1938) is an English journalist and author. In the British Press Awards of 1973, he was named Journalist of the Year for his work on labour conditions in South Africa, and he has also been a presenter of BBC Television's Newsnight. Since 2004, he has edited The Good Hotel Guide. He is not to be confused with a BBC producer of the same name, Adam Jocelyn Raphael (1937–1999).

== Early life ==
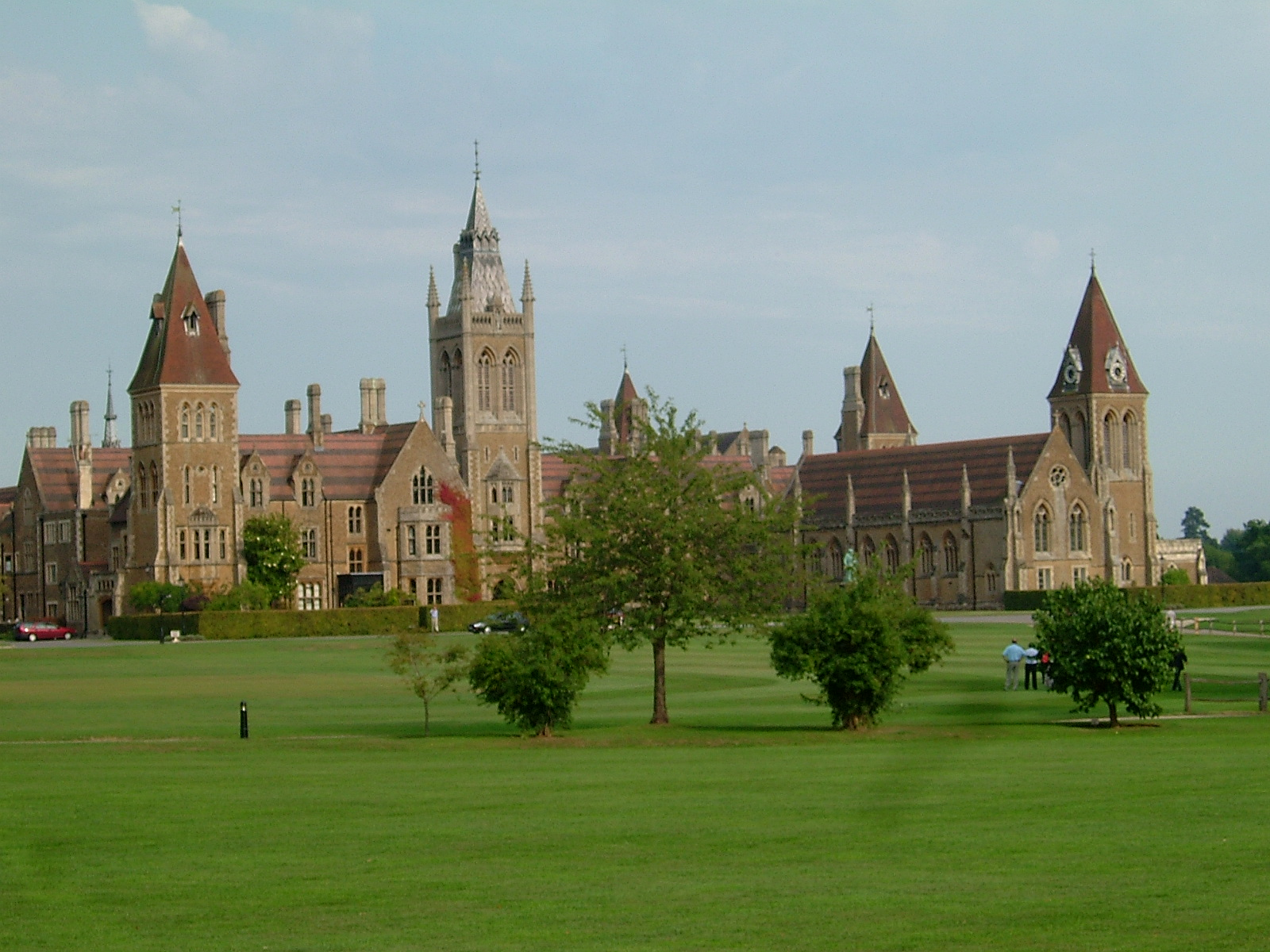
Charterhouse School

The son of Geoffrey George Raphael and his wife Nancy Raphael (née Rose), Raphael was educated at two independent schools: Arnold House School in St John's Wood in north-west London, and Charterhouse in Godalming, Surrey (where he was a contemporary of David Dimbleby), followed by Oriel College, Oxford, graduating with a BA with Honours in History.

== Career ==
Raphael undertook national service with the Royal Artillery, and was commissioned as a Second Lieutenant on 1 June 1957, subsequently serving in Germany. After leaving the army, he went to Oriel College, Oxford where he graduated with a second-class degree in history in 1961. After university, Raphael went to the USA where he worked as a copy boy at The Washington Post under Ben Bradlee, its editor. Returning from the US in 1962, he was employed by Westminster Press first on the Swindon Evening Advertiser and then on the Bath Evening Chronicle as a reporter and film critic.

In 1965 he arrived in Fleet Street as a reporter on The Guardian, working as the newspaper's motoring correspondent from 1967 to 1968 before serving overseas as its foreign correspondent in Washington, D.C., and South Africa from 1969 to 1973. On 12 March 1973, The Guardian published an article headlined: 'British firms pay Africans starvation rate.' It is a result of an investigation by Raphael conducted in South Africa into the employment practices of 100 leading British companies. It found only three (Shell, ICI and Unilever) were paying above the minimum for an African family to avoid malnutrition. Among the companies paying below this minimum were Courtaulds, British Leyland and General Electric. The story led to an immediate pay rise for thousands of African workers and the setting up of a British parliamentary committee. This recommended a code of conduct for British companies operating in South Africa. Raphael was named 'Journalist of the Year' in the National Press Awards that year.

On his return to London from South Africa, he was appointed as The Guardian's consumer affairs columnist from 1974 to 1976, before moving to The Observer as political correspondent, 1976–1981, and then as the political editor, 1981–1986.

In 1984 and 1989, The Observer printed articles by Raphael which suggested that the lobbyist Ian Greer had been paying members of parliament to table parliamentary questions, an early stage of the Cash for Questions scandal.

In 1987, Raphael briefly moved to BBC Television as a presenter of its daily current affairs programme, Newsnight (1987–1988). He returned to the paper in 1988 as an assistant Editor, and Executive Editor from 1988 to 1993.

In March 1989 The Observer published an article by Raphael which claimed that British Aerospace was selling Tornado aircraft to Jordan at inflated prices to include the cost of bribes. Raphael's colleague David Leigh complained to the directors of The Observer that Raphael had written it to suit Lonrho, which had a stake in British Aerospace's rival, Dassault Aviation. The MP Dale Campbell-Savours tabled motions in the House of Commons denouncing the article. The directors of The Observer dismissed Leigh's complaint, and he resigned from the newspaper in protest.

In 1989, Raphael published a book on some libel cases, My Learned Friends: an Insider's View of the Jeffrey Archer Case and Other Notorious Actions, which focused on the remarkable case of Jeffrey Archer v. The Daily Star (1987).

In 1994, he moved to The Economist as a writer on home affairs, then as political correspondent, 1994 to 2004. Among many articles Raphael has published in The Economist is Theft: Sitting on the Fence, which helped to popularise the Market Reduction Approach to theft – designed by Mike Sutton- and revealed to the wider public the role of stolen goods markets in creating a demand for supply by theft and that the size of the stolen goods economy in Britain was £1.5 billion ($2.4 billion) annually.

In 1994, Raphael's book Ultimate Risk, the story of the Lloyd's of London catastrophe, became a best-seller in the UK. Between 1988 and 1992 Lloyd's recorded losses of some twelve billion US dollars, and Raphael wrote that it thus managed to "pauperize, if not bankrupt, as many as two in five of those who provided the market's capital." Raphael was himself a Lloyd's Name, and was thus able to write as an insider, one of the victims of the affair.

In 1987, Raphael was subpoenaed as a witness by the Daily Star when Jeffrey Archer sued it over a story that he had consorted with a prostitute, Monica Coghlan. Raphael was a crucial witness as The Observer's political editor. When the story broke in the News of the World, he rang Archer, who was then Vice-Chairman of the Conservative Party and asked him whether it was true. Archer replied that he had met Monica 'on only one occasion' and that he had been disgracefully set up by the paper. This evidence was central to the subsequent libel trial. The judge, Bernard Caulfield, described Raphael as 'a thorn in Archer’s side' but the jury chose to believe Archer that he had never met Monica and awarded him £500,000 in damages. In the middle of the trial, Raphael was attacked by the editor of the Mail on Sunday, Stewart Steven, for having betrayed Archer as a source. This led to another libel action which ended with the Mail on Sunday paying Raphael £40,000 in costs and damages. Shortly after the Archer trial, Raphael wrote My Learned Friends (1989) in which he alleged that the jury had been misled by Archer’s alibi witnesses. It took another decade for the truth to emerge. In 1999, Raphael wrote an article in The Economist which said that Archer had asked him to change his evidence and that he had lied about where he had been on the night he met Monica. Two years later in 2001 Archer was tried for perjury and jailed for four years.

Raphael has been Editor of The Good Hotel Guide since 2004 and also an associate editor of Transport Times since 2005.

== Private life ==
In 1970, Raphael married Caroline Rayner Ellis, and they have one son and one daughter. In Who's Who, he gives his recreations as "tennis, golf, skiing", and his clubs as the Garrick, the Hurlingham, and the Royal Automobile Club.

== Awards ==
- Granada Investigative Journalist of the Year, 1973
- British Press Awards Journalist of the Year, 1973 (for a series in The Guardian on labour conditions in South Africa).

== Books ==
- My Learned Friends: an Insider's View of the Jeffrey Archer Case and Other Notorious Actions (London, W. H. Allen & Virgin Books, 16 November 1989)
- Ultimate Risk: the inside story of the Lloyd's catastrophe (London, Four Walls Eight Windows, 1994)
- The Good Hotel Guide 2001: Great Britain and Ireland (with Caroline Raphael) (London, Ebury Press, October 2000)
- The Good Hotel Guide 2001: Continental Europe (with Caroline Raphael) (London, Ebury Press, February 2001)
- The Good Hotel Guide 2002: Great Britain and Ireland (with Caroline Raphael) (London, Ebury Press, 6 September 2001)
- The Good Hotel Guide 2005 (with Caroline Raphael) (London, The Good Hotel Guide Ltd, January 2005)
- The Good Hotel Guide 2005: Continental Europe (with Caroline Raphael) (London, Steerforth, 15 March 2005)
- The Good Hotel Guide 2006: Great Britain and Ireland (with Desmond Balmer) (London, Steerforth, 6 December 2005)
- The Good Hotel Guide 2007 (London, The Good Hotel Guide Ltd, 2006)
- The Good Hotel Guide 2008 (with Desmond Balmer) (London, The Good Hotel Guide Ltd, 1 October 2007, ISBN 978-0-9549404-2-3)
