= Edwin H. Sutherland Award =

Annual criminology award

The Edwin H. Sutherland Award is an annual award that has been given by the American Society of Criminology (ASC) since 1960. Named for the influential American criminologist Edwin H. Sutherland, the award recognizes a scholar who has made distinguished contributions to theory or research in criminology. It is the most important annual award given by the ASC. By celebrating exceptional scholarly achievements in criminology, the award not only honors individual contributions but also fosters continued innovation and excellence within the discipline.

== See also ==
- List of social sciences awards
