= Social disorganization theory =

Criminology theory

Social disorganization theory is a theory of criminology that was established in 1929 by Clifford Shaw and published in 1942 with his assistant Henry McKay. It is used to describe crime and delinquency in urban North American cities, it suggests that communities characterized by socioeconomic status, ethnic heterogeneity, and residential mobility are impeded from organizing to realize the common goals of their residents.

== Theory ==
In 1929, as part of the study “Juvenile Delinquency and Urban Areas” in Chicago, Shaw researched the residences of 60,000 young males who had been registered by the city, the police or the courts as school truants or offenders. He dubbed the areas in which a significant portion of the young men under investigation lived “delinquency areas”.

== Criticism ==
The theory has been subject to criticism, pointing out the lack of explanation as to why delinquency is concentrated in certain geographical areas of a city. Research has deemed the theory inconclusive, and that most cities don’t adhere to what was a commonly accepted theory for quite some time.

== See also ==
- Organized crime
