= Catherine Latimer =

Catherine Latimer may refer to:

- Catherine Latimer (lawyer), Canadian lawyer
- Catherine Allen Latimer, New York Public Library's first African-American librarian.
