= Andrew George =

Andrew George may refer to:

- Andrew George (diplomat) (born 1952), governor and commander-in-chief of Anguilla
- Andrew George (politician) (born 1958), British Liberal Democrat member of parliament
- Andrew George (immunologist) (born 1963), professor of immunology
- Andrew R. George (born 1955), British academic and translator
- Andrew George Jr. (born 1963), Canadian First Nation chef and writer

== See also ==
- Andrew George Blair (1844–1907), Canadian politician
- Andrew George Lehmann (1922–2006), English academic
