= Donald Cressey =

American sociologist (1919–1987)

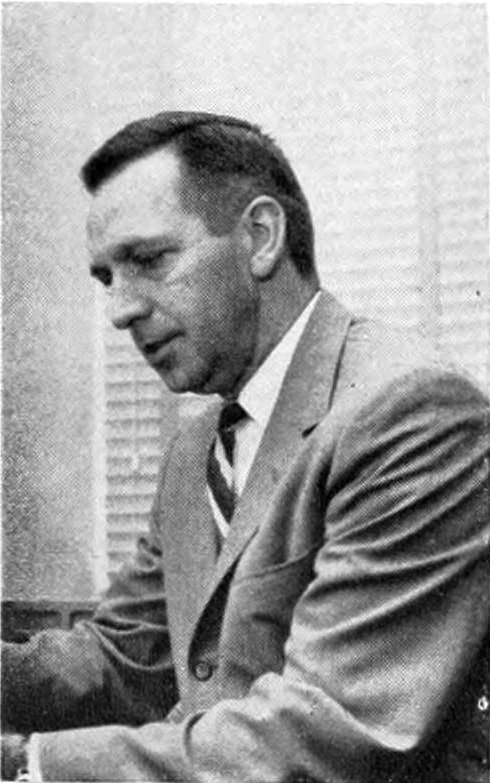
- Cressey in 1960
- Born: Donald Ray Cressey; April 27, 1919; Fergus Falls, Minnesota, U.S.
- Died: July 21, 1987 (aged 68); Solvang, California, U.S.
- Education: Iowa State University, Indiana University
- Occupations: Sociologist, criminologist, penologist
- Spouse: Elaine
- Children: 3

Donald Ray Cressey (April 27, 1919 – July 21, 1987) was an American penologist, sociologist, and criminologist who made innovative contributions to the study of organized crime, prisons, criminology, the sociology of criminal law, white-collar crime.

== Life and work ==
Born in 1919 in Fergus Falls, Minnesota, he obtained his bachelor's degree from Iowa State College in 1943 and earned his Ph.D. from Indiana University in 1950. He taught sociology at the University of California, Santa Barbara. Along with Edwin Sutherland, he co-authored Principles of Criminology, for 30 years the standard text in criminology. He also wrote Other People's Money, a study of embezzlement, and co-authored the popular textbook Social Problems. After his retirement, he was president of the Institute for Financial Crime Prevention, a foundation for the research of white-collar crime.

He served as a consultant on organized crime for the President's Commission on Law Enforcement and Administration of Justice in 1966 and 1967. Based on research conducted in this capacity he wrote the acclaimed Theft of the Nation, a treatise on the Cosa Nostra, and later the smaller Criminal Organization, in which he extended his conceptualization of organized crime to include criminal groups other than the Cosa Nostra.

Cressey is credited with the theory of the "fraud triangle", three elements that are present in most cases of occupational fraud. Cressey himself did not use this term during his lifetime. For two of the three motivational factors identified by Cressey, he drew on the thoughts of the US-American sociologist of German-Danish origin Svend Riemer (1905–1977).

Donald Cressey died in Solvang, California, in 1987. He had a wife, Elaine, and three daughters (Martha, Ann, and Mary).

== Awards ==
The Donald Cressey Award is bestowed annually on an American academic by the National Council on Crime and Delinquency for outstanding academic contributions to criminology.

The Cressey Award is bestowed annually by the Association of Certified Fraud Examiners on one of its members for lifetime achievement in the detection and deterrence of fraud.

== Works ==
=== Solely authored works ===
- Criminal Organization: Its Elementary Forms, New York: Harper and Row, 1972. ISBN 0-06-131692-X
- "Methodological Problems in the Study of Organized Crime as a Social Problem", Annals of the American Academy of Political and Social Science, 374 (1967).
- "Organized Crime and Inner-City Youth", Crime and Delinquency, 16:2 (1970).
- Theft of the Nation: The Structure and Operations of Organized Crime in America, New York: Harper and Row, 1969.
- Other People's Money: A Study in the Social Psychology of Embezzlement, Montclair, N.J.: Patterson Smith, 1953. ISBN 978-0-87585-202-7

=== Co-authored works ===
- Coleman, James W., and Cressey, Donald R. Social Problems, New York: Prentice Hall, 1980. ISBN 0-673-99653-0
- Sutherland, Edwin H., and Cressey, Donald. Principles of Criminology, 11th edn. Lanham, Md.: AltaMira Press, 1992. ISBN 0-930390-69-5
