= Institute for Juvenile Research =

The Institute for Juvenile Research (IJR) is a research, demonstration and training center housed in the Department of Psychiatry, College of Medicine, University of Illinois at Chicago. The institute has more than 40 faculty members and 65 professional staff members. IJR programs address pressing issues such as HIV risk, access to effective school services, the epidemiology of drug abuse, services for families in the child welfare system and the training of child mental health providers. The institute also offers child psychiatry clinical services and training programs in child and adolescent psychiatry, psychology and social work.

== History ==
=== Before and after the Great Chicago Fire ===
Before 1871, the year of the Great Chicago Fire, Chicago's population was 300,000 people. Twenty years later, in 1891, Chicago's population was a little over a million people. By the 1910s Chicago's population had risen to over two million, and by the mid-1920s the population was three million. This growth was driven by European immigration resulting in over 70% of Chicago's population being either foreign-born or first-generation immigrant. Because times were hard, parents were working overtime to scrape out a living, and children, who had to work to contribute to the family's livelihood, were “ill-fed, ill-housed, ill-clothed, illiterate, and wholly untrained and unfitted for any occupation." The results were that many families were being disrupted by poverty and unfamiliar community circumstances as result of immigration, were not able to properly care for their children. The reality that the new European immigrants were not doing well was also found in the extraordinarily high rates of European immigrant's domestic violence in Chicago from 1875 to 1920. Accordingly, in 1889, Nobel Prize–winning social worker, Jane Addams (1860–1935) founded Hull House on Chicago's Near West Side as a social settlement house “to aid in the solution of the social and industrial problems which are engendered by the modern conditions of life in a great city.” She observed “Children over ten years of age were arrested, held in the police stations, tried in the police courts. If convicted they were usually fined and if the fine was not paid sent to the city prison. However, often they were let off because justices could neither tolerate sending children to Bridewell nor bear in themselves guilty of the harsh folly of compelling poverty-stricken parents to pay fines. No exchange of court records existed and the same children could be in and out of various police stations an indefinite number of times, more hardened and more skillful with each experience.” In an effort to distinguish between criminality and juvenile delinquency, in 1899, Jane Addams and her female colleagues helped to start the world's first Juvenile Court in Chicago, Illinois, the Juvenile Protective Association.

=== 1909 - Establishment of the Juvenile Psychopathic Institute ===
Ten years later, in 1909, these foresighted women established the Juvenile Psychopathic Institute (JPI) in Chicago, the world's first child guidance clinic, and Mrs. Ethel Dummer provided funding for five years. Neurologist William Healy, M.D., its first director, is charged with not only studying the delinquent's biological aspects of brain functioning and IQ, but also the delinquent's social factors, attitudes, and motivations, thus it was the birthplace of American child and adolescent psychiatry. These studies determined that there was no relationship between biological heredity and criminality.

=== 1917 - The State of Illinois takes over funding of the JPI ===
In 1917, these women convinced the State of Illinois to take over the funding for the institute (JPI, and in 1920, Illinois created the Department of Public Welfare and changed the name of JPI to the Institute for Juvenile Research (IJR)). IJR's goal was to develop an understanding of the causes of behavioral disturbances in youth by doing research and providing service to delinquent youth while also developing strategies to prevent delinquency. IJR researchers Shaw and McKay [9] noted delinquency was less due to biological, ethnic, or cultural factors and more due to social disruption eroding formal and informal social control in specific transitional neighborhoods ("delinquency areas") in a city. In an effort to prevent delinquency the Chicago Area Project was born, designed to create social fabric in "delinquency areas."

=== Directors ===
Notable directors of IJR were Drs. Franz Alexander known for his work on Psychosomatic Medicine, short-term psychotherapy, and the corrective emotional experience Julius B. Richmond, M.D. a pediatrician who would later develop Head Start and served as Surgeon General of the United States under President Jimmy Carter, and Dr. Carl Bell (physician) who worked with President William Clinton cabinet members Janet Reno, Donna Shalala and David Satcher on issues of the violence against women act and youth violence.

=== Multidisciplinary approach ===
During its early years, the institute was one of the first organizations to integrate the fields of medicine, psychiatry, psychology and social work into the study of child development, an approach that continues to this day. “Primary emphasis,” noted pioneering IJR sociologist Clifford Shaw, “must be placed upon the task of revitalizing the life of the whole community so that the welfare of every child becomes the conscious and deliberate concern of all the citizens.”

=== Innovations ===
IJR psychologist, Marion Monroe who investigated the relations of reading difficulties and delinquency was credited with developing methods for early childhood reading programs, which led to the Dick and Jane readers. In addition, Chester Darrow, Ph.D., set up IJR's psychophysiology laboratory, where he worked from 1926 to 1967, publishing over 150 scientific papers. He developed dozens of machines that measured the relationship of behavior to physiologic changes in the body, and, from these innovations, came early modifications of the Polygraphy machine (also known as the lie detector). Dr. Darrow's efforts also led to the development of the electroencephalograms, EEG, that records the deep electrical functioning of the brain.

=== 1990 - IJR becomes a part of the University of Illinois ===
In 1990, under the guidance of Dr. Boris Astracan, the Chairman of the Department of Psychiatry during that period, the Institute for Juvenile Research became a part of the Department of Psychiatry, College of Medicine, University of Illinois at Chicago.
