= Carl Bell =

Carl Bell may refer to:

- Carl Bell (musician) (born 1967), American musician and producer
- Carl Bell (physician) (1947–2019), professor of psychiatry and public health at the University of Illinois at Chicago
- Carl Bell (wrestler) (1925–1966), Native American wrestler
