= Albert K. Cohen =

American criminologist

Albert Kircidel Cohen (June 15, 1918 – November 25, 2014) was a prominent American criminologist. He is known for his Subcultural Theory of delinquent urban gangs, including his influential book Delinquent Boys: Culture of the Gang. He has served as Vice President of the American Society of Criminology from 1984–1985 and in 1993 he received the society's Edwin H. Sutherland award.

== Work ==
Albert Cohen was a student of Talcott Parsons and wrote a Ph.D. under his inspiration. Parsons and Cohen continued to correspond also after Cohen left Harvard. In his 1955 work, Delinquent Boys: The Culture of the Gang, Cohen wrote about delinquent gangs and suggested in his theoretical discussion how such gangs attempted to "replace" society's common norms and values with their own sub-cultures. He proposed two basic ideologies, the first of which is called status frustration.
