= T. J. Hamblin =

British academic (1943–2012)

Professor Terence Hamblin

Terence John Hamblin (12 March 1943 – 8 January 2012) was a British academic and scientist who was professor of immunohaematology at the University of Southampton from 1987 until his death.

== Life and career ==
Born in Worcester, England, Hamblin's early years were spent in Aldershot in Hampshire where he and his family lived on Cambridge Road; he was educated at Farnborough Grammar School (1954–1961) and the University of Bristol.

He was appointed as Consultant Haematologist in Bournemouth in 1974. He pursued a research career in haematology and immunology, successively becoming an expert in plasma exchange, stem cell transplantation, monoclonal antibody therapy, myelodysplastic syndrome and chronic lymphocytic leukaemia. He was awarded a Guernsey Fellowship for stem cell transplantation in 1986 and the Binet-Rai Medal for outstanding research in CLL in 2002.

He was a prolific author of books, chapters, original peer-reviewed articles, reviews, editorials, and web articles on scientific and medical topics. He was editor of the scientific journal Leukemia Research (1986–) and a columnist for the comic/medical political magazine World Medicine (1976–84).

His most important research discovery, with Professor Freda Stevenson, was that chronic lymphocytic leukaemia comes in two forms, depending on whether the immunoglobulin heavy chain variable region genes contain somatic mutations. If they do, the survival of the patient averages 25 years; if they do not, the survival of the patient averages 8 years.

Hamblin presented the BBC 2 episode 'Of Mice and Men' (1998) in its Counterblast series, in which he argued for the use of animals in medical research.

He publicised the fact that, contrary to popular belief, spinach contains no more iron than lettuce, while pink succulent lobster contains none at all; like all invertebrates its respiratory pigment is based on copper rather than iron. He claimed in a 1981 BMJ paper that the belief in spinach having a high iron content was due to a decimal point error that was discovered in the 1930s; Mike Sutton published an article in 2010 questioning Hamblin's story. In a later article, Sutton discovered that, contrary to popular belief, Hamblin was not the original source of the spinach decimal error myth.

He was elected a Fellow of the Academy of Medical Sciences in 2002.

Hamblin died on 8 January 2012 of cancer.
