= Subcultural theory =

Theory in criminology

In criminology, subcultural theory emerged from the work of the Chicago School on gangs and developed through the symbolic interactionism school into a set of theories arguing that certain groups or subcultures in society have values and attitudes that are conducive to crime and violence. The primary focus is on juvenile delinquency because theorists believe that if this pattern of offending can be understood and controlled, it will break the transition from teenage offender into habitual criminal. Some of the theories are functionalist, assuming that criminal activity is motivated by economic needs, while others posit a social class rationale for deviance.

== Frederic M. Thrasher ==
Frederic M. Thrasher (1927: 46) studied gangs in a systematic way, analyzing gang activity and behavior. He defined gangs by the process they go through to form a group:

"The gang is an interstitial group originally formed spontaneously, and then integrated through conflict. It is characterized by the following types of behavior: meeting face to face, milling, movement through space as a unit, conflict, and planning. The result of this collective behavior is the development of tradition, unreflective internal structure, esprit de corps, solidarity, morale, group awareness, and attachment to a local territory."

== E. Franklin Frazier ==
In the earliest stages of the Chicago School and their investigation of human ecology, one of the key tropes was the concept of disorganization which contributed to the emergence of an underclass.

== Albert K. Cohen ==
Albert K. Cohen (1955) did not look at the economically oriented career criminal, but looked at the delinquency subculture, focusing on gang delinquency among working class youth in slum areas which developed a distinctive culture as a response to their perceived lack of economic and social opportunity within U.S. society.

== Richard Cloward and Lloyd Ohlin ==
Richard Cloward and Lloyd Ohlin made reference to R. K. Merton's Strain Theory, while taking a further step in how the Subculture was 'Parallel' in their opportunities: the Criminal subculture had the same rules and level.

== Walter Miller ==
Walter Miller (1958, 1959) agreed with Cohen that there was a delinquency subculture, but argued that it arose entirely from the lower class way of life.

== David Matza ==
David Matza (1964) argued that, rather than being committed to delinquency, young people drifted between conventional and unconventional behavior, thus due to - often - their unconventional childhood tribulations.

== Phil Cohen ==
Phil Cohen (1972) studied the youth of East London in the early 1970s. He examined the immediate and the wider context to determine how two different youth subcultures reacted to the changes occurring in their community. He suggested that the Mod reaction was to the new ideology of affluence. They wanted to show that they had money and knew how to spend it. In contrast, skinheads looked back to the more traditional working class community. Each generation tries to find employment or adapts to unemployment. But the 1920s had very different economic circumstances to later decades. Cohen argued that youth develop a cultural style as a means of coping with their particular circumstances and of resisting the dominant values of society. This casts working class youth as the standard bearers of class struggle. There is little in real terms that youth can do to change society, but resistance offers subjective satisfaction which can be shown through style: the clothes, haircuts, music and language of the different youth cultures. Cohen argued that these styles are not meaningless, but are deeply layered in meaning. This is an application of Marxist Subcultural Theory which synthesised the structuralism of Marxism with the Labelling Theory. The approach matched that of the Centre for Contemporary Cultural Studies at Birmingham University (see Crow: 1997). This approach places emphasis on the contents of youth culture and on the differences produced by class background. The assumption is that a capitalist society attempts to achieve hegemony by using the cultural values of society for their own benefit. The domination of the adults is enforced through the system of mortgages, credit cards, and family commitments, and they are seduced into accepting the relative security of capitalism. But the youth are relatively free of long-term commitment or responsibility for a family and, with many unemployed, the youth are the weakest point in the structure of hegemony.
