= Andrew George (immunologist) =

Andrew John Timothy George MBE (born 12 May 1963), is Deputy Vice-Chancellor (Educational and International) at Brunel University London and Professor of Immunology.

== Education ==
George was educated at Clifton College, Bristol. He studied Natural Sciences at Trinity College, Cambridge (Part II Pathology), before going to the Tenovus Laboratories, Southampton University, where he undertook his PhD (1987) under the supervision of Freda Stevenson (Idiotypic immunity against a B cell lymphoma).

== Career ==
Following his PhD, George was awarded a Beit Memorial Fellowship to carry out postdoctoral research at the Tenovus Laboratories. He then went to the National Institutes of Health to work in the laboratory of Dr David Segal, developing recombinant antibody-based molecules. He returned to the UK in 1992 to a lectureship at the Royal Postgraduate Medical School, Hammersmith Hospital (which merged with Imperial College London in 1997). He was promoted to Senior Lecturer, Reader and Professor of Molecular Immunology. His research has sought to understand and manipulate the immune system to treat disease. He was awarded a DSc by Imperial College London in 2012.

He was appointed director of the Graduate School of Life Sciences and Medicine in 2010, and then director of the merged Graduate School from 2011. He was Director of the School of Professional Development from 2010. In 2013 he moved to Brunel University London as Vice Principal/Deputy Vice Chancellor (Education & International) and Professor of Immunology.

== External appointments ==
George was Chair of the Hammersmith Hospitals Research Ethics Committee from 2000 to 2010, and chair of the National Research Ethics Advisors' Panel from 2009 to 2017. He was chair of the Gene Therapy Advisory Group in 2012, and continued as gene therapy advisor to the Health Research Authority. Between 2007 and 2017 he was a member of the Clinical Trials Expert Advisory Group for the Commission on Human Medicines and the MHRA, set up to scrutinize high risk clinical trials involving biological or similar agents.

He has served on many grant giving bodies, including Chair of the Scientific Advisory Panel of Action Medical Research (2008–2012), and on the NERC Training Advisory Group (2012–2014). He was Section Editor for Expert Opinion on Therapeutic Patents (1996–2000) and the Journal of Immunological Methods (1999–2003, Editorial Board 1996–2008) and on the Editorial Board of Trends in Immunology (2007–2011) and Transplantation (2000–2014).

George has been Trustee of Action Medical Research (2008–2015). He is currently governor of Richmond Adult Community College and of John Hampden Grammar School. He is a Director of Imperial College Healthcare Partners and West London Business.

== Fellowships and awards ==
George is a Fellow of the Royal College of Pathologists, of the Higher Education Academy, of the Royal Society of Arts and of the Royal Society of Biology. He has held honorary or visiting Chairs in the Institute of Ophthalmology (UCL), Flinders University and Hubei University of Medicine.

He was awarded an MBE in the 2017 New Year Honours List for services to research participants and the ethical governance of clinical research.
