= Richard Quinney =

American sociologist and photographer

Richard Quinney (born 1934) is an American sociologist, writer, and photographer known for his philosophical and critical approach to crime and social justice. Quinney grew up on a farm in Walworth County, Wisconsin. After earning his PhD in sociology from the University of Wisconsin, he taught at several universities on the East Coast and in the Midwest. He was awarded the Edwin Sutherland Award in 1984 by the American Society of Criminology for his contributions to criminological theory. He is currently professor emeritus of sociology at Northern Illinois University.

Richard Quinney is also the author of several books that combine photography with autobiographical writing. He founded the independent press Borderland Books in Madison, Wisconsin. In addition to Quinney's works, the press publishes books by other notable Wisconsin authors such as Roy Chapman Andrews, Glenway Wescott, and August Derleth.

He has two daughters, Laura and Anne, and lives with his wife Solveig in Madison, Wisconsin.

== Bibliography ==
=== Books—memoir, natural history, and photography ===
- Journey to a Far Place, Temple University Press, 1991.
- For the Time Being, State University Press of New York, 1998.
- Borderland: A Midwest Journal, University of Wisconsin Press, 2001.
- Where Yet the Sweet Birds Sing, Borderland Books, 2006.
- Once Again the Wonder, Borderland Books, 2006.
- Of Time and Place, Borderland Books, 2006.
- Tales from the Middle Border, Borderland Books, 2007
- Things Once Seen, Borderland Books, 2008
- Field Notes, Borderland Books, 2008
- A Lifetime Burning, Borderland Books, 2010
- Once Upon an Island, Borderland Books, 2011
- A Farm in Wisconsin, Borderland Books, 2012
- Ox Herding in Wisconsin, Borderland Books, 2013
- This World of Dreams, Borderland Books, 2014
- Diary of a Camera, Borderland Books, 2015
- Ox Herding in Wisconsin, Borderland Books, 2015
- The Morning Hour, Borderland Books, 2016
- Sketches: A Childhood Remembered, Borderland Books, 2016
- Mystery of the Marsh, Borderland Books, 2016
- Still Life with Camera, Borderland Books, 2016
- To This I Am Native, Borderland Books, 2018
- On the Open Road, Borderland Books, 2018
- Of Time and Place: A Family Farm in Wisconsin, Borderland Books, 2018
- Diary From the Old Place, Borderland Books, 2019

=== Books—academic sociology ===
- Criminal Behavior Systems, Holt, Rinehart and Winston, 1967.
- The Problem of Crime, Dodd, Mead, 1970.
- The Social Reality of Crime, Little, Brown, 1974.
- Critique of Legal Order, Little, Brown, 1974.
- Criminology, Little, Brown, 1975.
- Class, State, and Crime, Longman, 1977.
- Providence, Longman, 1980.
- Social Existence, Sage, 1982.
- Criminology as Peacemaking, Indiana University Press, 1991.
- Erich Fromm and Critical Criminology, University of Illinois Press, 2000.
- Bearing Witness to Crime and Social Justice, SUNY Press, 2000.
- Storytelling Sociology, Lynne Rienner Publishers, 2004.

== Sources ==
- Bartollas, Clemens and Dragan Milovanovic. Richard Quinney: Journey of Discovery. Palgrave Macmillan, 2019.
- Cullen, Francis T. and Pamela Wilcox. "Richard Quinney: Social Transformation and Peacemaking Criminology," Encyclopedia of Criminological Theory. Sage Publications, 2010, pp. 754–764.
- Encyclopædia Britannica. "Richard Quinney." (2008) Encyclopædia Britannica Online. <http://www.britannica.com/EBchecked/topic/1340924/Richard-Quinney>.
- Martin, R., Mutchnick, R.J., Austin, W., (1990) Criminological Thought: Pioneers Past and Present. New York: Macmillan, 379–404.
- Mobley, A.; Pepinsky, H.; Terry, C. (2002). "Exploring the paradox of the (un)reality of Richard Quinney's criminology". Crime & Delinquency. 48 (2): 316–332. doi:10.1177/0011128702048002008. S2CID 145708821.
- "Richard Quinney on the transformation of self and others: an interview," (2006) Contemporary Justice Review 9: 277–282
- Schaefer, D. (2008). "A review of Richard Quinney: Post retirement". Crime, Media, Culture. 4 (2): 294–303. doi:10.1177/1741659008097301. S2CID 145354234.
- Shelden, R. (2002). "Bearing Witness to Richard Quinney". Contemporary Justice Review. 5 (4): 403–405. doi:10.1080/10282580214778. S2CID 145570417.
- Sullivan, D. (1989). "Richard Quinney: An Interview". The Critical Criminologist. 1: 11–14.
- Sullivan, D. (2010). "The things a man once saw (and was): An appreciation of Richard Quinney". Contemporary Justice Review. 13 (3): 321–330. doi:10.1080/10282580.2010.498243. S2CID 143817470.
- Tifft, L. (2002). "Crime and peace: a walk with Richard Quinney". Crime & Delinquency. 48 (2): 243–63. doi:10.1177/0011128702048002004. S2CID 146309378.
- Trevino, A.J. (1989). "Richard Quinney: a Wisconsin sociologist". Wisconsin Sociologist. 26 (4): 126–34.
- Wozniak, J.F. (2002). "Toward a theoretical model of peacemaking criminology: an essay in honor of Richard Quinney". Crime & Delinquency. 48 (2): 204–31. doi:10.1177/0011128702048002002. S2CID 144213199.
- Wozniak, John F. (2008) and Michael C. Braswell, Ronald E. Vogel, and Kristie R. Blevins. Transformative Justice: Critical and Peacemaking Themes Influenced by Richard Quinney. Lexington Books.

== See also ==
- Borderland Books
- Wisconsin Historical Society
- Quinney, Richard. "Elegy for a Family Farm," Wisconsin People & Ideas, Winter 2018. pp. 26–33.
- Treviño, A. Javier. Clinard and Quinney's Criminal Behavior Systems. 4th Edition. Routledge, 2019.
