= Alex del Carmen =

American criminologist and police practices scholar

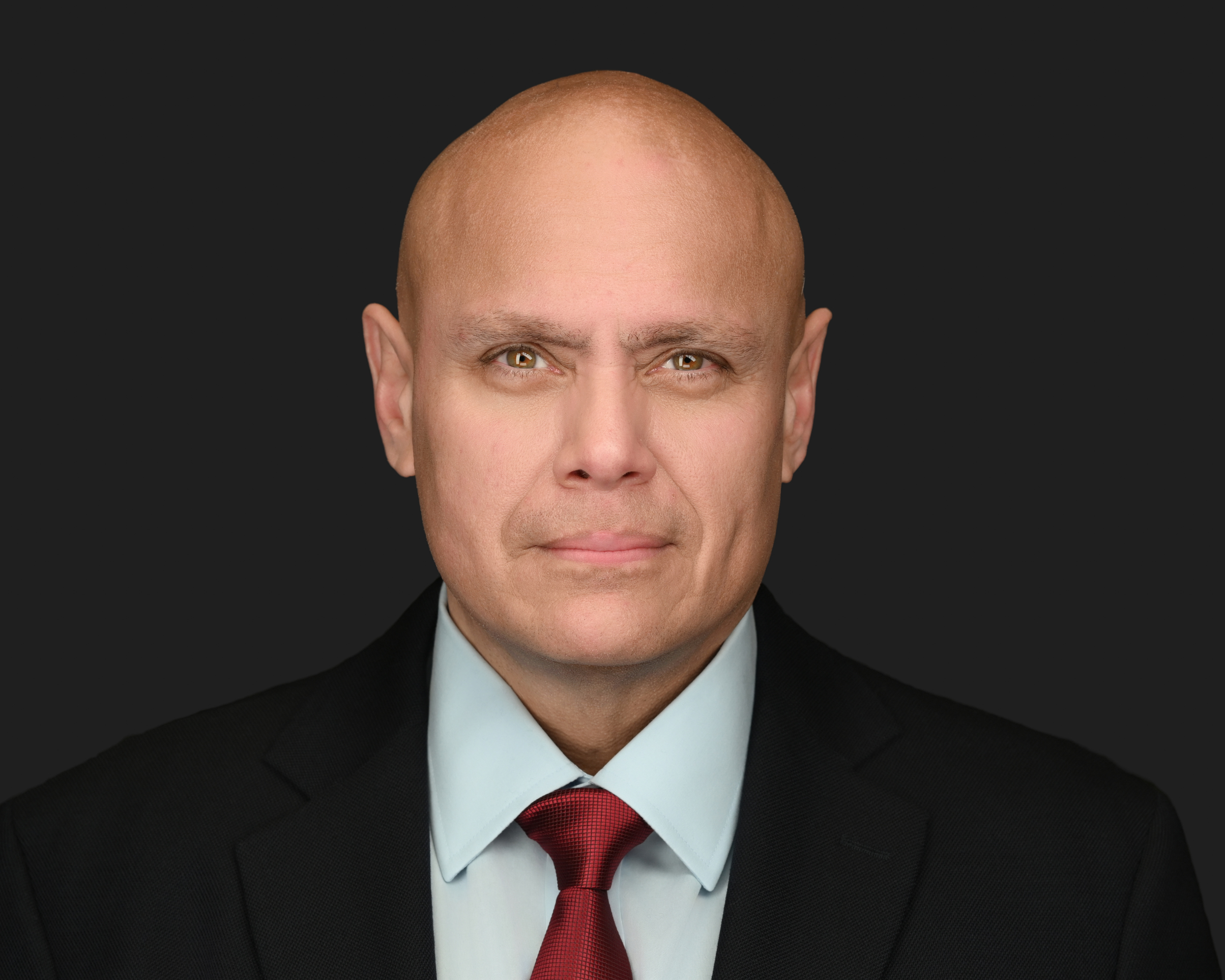
- Born: Alejandro del Carmen
- Occupation: Criminologist

Academic background
- Education: Florida State University (Ph.D.) Harvard University (Ed.M.)

Academic work
- Discipline: Criminology; criminal justice
- Sub-discipline: Police practices; racial profiling; civil rights oversight
- Notable works: ''Racial Profiling in America'' (2008); ''Racial Profiling in Policing: Beyond the Basics'' (2023)
- Website: https://delcarmenconsulting.com/

Alejandro del Carmen is a Nicaraguan and American criminologist and academic. He was a professor at Tarleton State University and director of its Institute for Predictive Analytics in Criminal Justice (IPAC), before retiring in 2026. Del Carmen is an authority on race and crime with expertise on police practices and racial profiling. He has trained thousands of police officers and police chiefs, and is a regular instructor at the FBI in Quantico.

== Early life and education ==
Del Carmen is a first-generation immigrant from Jinotepe, Nicaragua, where as a child he lived through political unrest and civil war. These early experiences inspired del Carmen to pursue criminology and develop an understanding of the psychology of people who enact violence against others. In 1997, del Carmen received a Ph.D. in Criminology from the College of Criminology at the Florida State University. In 2025, del Carmen earned a Master's in Education from the Harvard Graduate School of Education.

== Field Work ==
Del Carmen has trained thousands of police officers including all the Texas Police Chiefs since 2001. He is also responsible for creating the Texas racial profiling statistical template widely used by law enforcement agencies throughout the state.

In 2021, del Carmen co‑chaired an expert review panel that examined police practices for the City Council and Office of Police Oversight Monitor in Fort Worth, Texas. He previously served as a Federal Monitor for the United States Federal Court, Eastern District of Louisiana. Del Carmen presently serves as Special Master for the United States Federal Court, District of Puerto Rico, which has operated under a federal consent decree since an investigation in 2011 found discriminatory police practice against racial minorities. Del Carmen was appointed as a Fulbright Specialist by the United States Department of State, most recently at the Police Academy of the Czech Republic in May 2022.

Del Carmen is the founder and CEO of Del Carmen Consulting, LLC. His firm, which was founded in 2001, works with hundreds of law enforcement agencies throughout the country.

== Public Commentary ==
Del Carmen is frequently a criminologist expert guest on media outlets that include: Fox, CNN, Fox News Radio, Telemundo, Univision and NBC. Del Carmen has been asked to contribute his advice on a variety of topics, including violence enacted by police officers and against law enforcement. He discussed coverage of racial‑profiling data and misclassification issues affecting Hispanic drivers in the New York Times and ProPublica, and shared insight into police pursuit decision making in CBS News the vulnerability of teachers as targets to scam calls.

Del Carmen has commented on consent degrees and their use in police reform efforts throughout the United States. Specifically, he has suggested that the federal government offer clear directives to establish standards related to use of force within police departments.

== Academic career ==
Del Carmen joined the faculty of the University of Texas at Arlington, where he chaired the Department of Criminology and Criminal Justice. In 2014, del Carmen moved to Tarleton State University, serving as professor and associate dean, and in 2020, he became the director of the Institute for Predictive Analytics in Criminal Justice (IPAC).

In 2020, del Carmen led a team to conduct the first comprehensive analysis of racial-profiling data in Texas through the Texas A&M University System. This data was collected from nearly 2,000 agencies under the Sandra Bland Act, and findings have been cited in Texas news coverage about traffic‑stop disparities and police pursuits. Del Carmen worked with additional university faculty to gain approval from the Texas Higher Education Board for Tarleton's first PhD program, and in 2024, was named a Regents Professor by The Texas A&M System Board of Regents for exemplary performance.

Del Carmen has taught at the FBI National Academy in Quantico as a guest instructor on police practices and civil liability.

== Select Publications ==
=== Books ===
- ''Racial Profiling in America'' (Prentice Hall, 2008)
- ''Racial Profiling in Policing: Beyond the Basics'' (2nd ed., Kendall Hunt, 2023)

=== Articles ===
- Del Carmen, A., Bowling, B. (2024). A Precarious Balance: Enforcing the Law While Protecting Civil Rights. Police Chief.
- Tao, J., Chism, K., Luo, F., del Carmen, A., Bowling, B. (2025). Catalysts of generative AI adoption in policing: The primacy of transformational leadership and organizational capacity. Policing: An International Journal of Policing Strategies and Management.
- Luo, F., Chism, K., Tao, J., Gibson, C., Bowling, B., & Del Carmen, A. (2025). The journey from college to law enforcement: crossing the threshold into a policing career. Criminal Justice Review.

== Honors ==
In 2021, del Carmen received the Gary W. Sykes award, one of the highest honors given by the Institute of Law Enforcement Administration. In 2024, del Carmen was named a Regents Professor by The Texas A&M University System. He has been selected as a fellow in the Hispanic Association of Colleges and Universities (HACU) Leadership Academy/La Academia de Liderazgo.
