= Clifford Shaw =

American sociologist and criminologist

- Born: 1895; Luray, Indiana
- Died: 1957 (aged 61–62)
- Education: Adrian College; Johns Hopkins University; University of Chicago
- Known for: Juvenile delinquency
- Scientific career
- Fields: Criminology; Sociology
- Institutions: George Williams College; Central YMCA College; Institute for Juvenile Research; University of Chicago

Clifford Robe Shaw (1895 – 1957) was an American sociologist and criminologist. He was a major figure in the Chicago School of sociology during the 1930s and 1940s, and is considered to be one of the most influential figures in American criminology. His work on juvenile delinquency with Henry D. McKay, conducted in the late 1920s, played a pivotal role in moving the study of such delinquency toward the discipline of sociology, and away from psychology and psychiatry. Shaw and McKay's work spanned three general areas: studying geographic variation in rates of juvenile delinquency, the study of autobiographical works by delinquents, and the development of the Chicago Area Project, a delinquency prevention program in the Chicago area related to his Social Disorganization theory. The two studies published by Shaw and McKay in the 1930s and 1940s were still held in high regard among social scientists in the 1970s.
