= Catherine Latimer (lawyer) =

Canadian lawyer and criminologist

Catherine Latimer OC
- Born: Ottawa, Canada
- Education: University of Waterloo (BA), Cambridge University (MA), Queen's University at Kingston (JD)
- Occupation(s): lawyer, criminologist, expert witness

Catherine Latimer OC (born in Ottawa) is a Canadian lawyer, criminologist and expert witness. She has served as the executive director of the John Howard Society of Canada since 2011. She earned a BA at the University of Waterloo in 1975, a Masters in Criminology from Cambridge University and a Juris Doctor from Queen's University at Kingston in 1978. She was invested with the Order of Canada in 2018.
