= Market reduction approach =

Method of reducing crime rates

Market reduction approach (MRA) is an approach to reducing crime by reducing the opportunity for thieves to fence or resell what they have stolen.

== History ==
=== Early ===
In 1796, the London magistrate Patrick Colquhoun observed that "[i]t rarely happens that thieves go upon the highway, or commit burglaries, until the money they have previously acquired is exhausted," and that "...without a safe and ready market he [the thief] is undone."

Recognizing the key role played by dealers in stolen goods in facilitating profit from theft and motivation for offenders to steal and with an aim to influence harsher legislation and sentencing of professional fences, the American jurisprudentialist Jerome Hall emphasised the role of the professional fence in the marketing of stolen goods and created a typology that distinguished between professional fences, part-time dealers, and those who knowingly buy stolen goods for their own consumption. A number of ethnography studies (e.g. Klockars 1974; Henry 1977 and Steffensmeir 1986) hinted at the influence of the market for stolen goods upon levels of theft of certain goods.

A systematic study of the various ways that stolen goods are stored, sold and bought – going beyond the previous focus upon the guilty mind and level of involvement of dealers and consumers – was conducted by Mike Sutton, who created a fivefold market typology based on his interviews with expert prolific thieves, inexperienced thieves, fences, drug dealers and stolen goods consumers. In 1998, the UK Home Office published Sutton's report proposing a systematic framework for researching and tackling local stolen goods markets.

=== Modern ===
Current development of the market reduction approach (MRA) has its origins in a 1995 British Journal of Criminology paper: Supply by Theft that was followed by a 1998 United Kingdom Government Home Office research study entitled Handling Stolen Goods and Theft: A Market Reduction Approach, both written by Mike Sutton Further work on implementing and process evaluation of the MRA was conducted by Schneider.

Described by Marcus Felson as "...a simple idea in an important article" and as classic research, Sutton's concept of MRA has had an influence upon theory and practice regarding stolen goods markets and markets for other illicit commodities. Some criminologists have incorporated Sutton's work on stolen goods markets to explain the issue of offenders’ capacity to commit crimes. The general MRA principles have influenced work beyond research into markets for theft of high volume consumer goods, since the MRA is described as underpinning recent research into illicit markets for cultural artefacts and as a useful method for tackling the trade in endangered species.

Sutton's 1998 stolen goods Handling Report includes findings from the nationally representative British Crime Survey (1994). This revealed that 11 percent of those questioned had bought stolen goods in the preceding five years, and that 70 percent believed that some of their neighbours had stolen goods in their homes. The Handling Report was followed by a more comprehensive MRA policing guide to stolen goods markets.

== Application ==
Kent constabulary were the first to experiment with the MRA in Operation Radium. This experiment at systematically tackling stolen goods markets, along with another MRA initiative by the Greater Manchester Police, as routine policing (rather than merely cracking down from time to time) was independently evaluated by criminologists from The University of Kent. The evaluation found that while the MRA theory remains sound that the police forces experienced organisational difficulties implementing it correctly.

Based on Situational Crime Prevention (SCP) "rational choice, opportunity reduction" principles, and employing philosophy from routine activity theory (RAT) the MRA is designed to reduce theft through reducing the demand for stolen goods that motivated thieves to steal. In addition it seeks to make handling stolen goods at least as difficult as it is to steal them and to increase the risks of detection for all those selling and buying stolen goods. In this way the MRA answered a long-standing academic criticism that SCP and RAT did not take account of offender motivation. MRA principles are now firmly established within both SCP RAT and Problem Oriented Policing (POP) key texts.

The MRA has been implemented in the United Kingdom by Kent Constabulary, West Mercia Constabulary, Derby City Constabulary, Nottinghamshire Constabulary, and Greater Manchester Police. It is recommended crime reduction practice by the UK United States, and Australian governments. The New Zealand Ministry of Justice conducted a review of research focused on the MRA and identified eight areas of good practice in using it to tackle property crime.

In 2008, the MRA has been applied to research focused upon tackling markets for endangered species.

== The MRA and problem oriented policing ==
Introducing a sixth market type, e-fencing, the MRA is used by the US Department of Justice, Office of Community Oriented Policing Services, to combat crime with the problem-oriented approach to policing.
