= Carl Bell (physician) =

American physician (1947–2019)

Carl Compton Bell
- Born: October 28, 1947
- Died: August 2, 2019 (aged 71)
- Education: University of Illinois Chicago; Meharry Medical College
- Occupation: Psychiatrist
- Employer: University of Illinois Chicago

Carl Compton Bell (October 28, 1947 – August 2, 2019) was an American professor of psychiatry and public health at the University of Illinois at Chicago. Bell was a National Institute of Mental Health international researcher, an author of more than 575 books, chapters, and articles addressing issues of violence prevention, HIV prevention, isolated sleep paralysis, misdiagnosis of Manic depressive illness, and children exposed to violence.

Bell was the President/C.E.O. of the Community Mental Health Council, Inc. a large not-for-profit community mental health centers in the U.S. He was also the Director of the Institute for Juvenile Research (Birthplace of Child Psychiatry) at the University of Illinois at Chicago. He was a staff psychiatrist at Jackson Park Hospital and Medical Center on Chicago's Southside.

== Biography ==
Bell was born in Chicago's Bronzeville neighborhood, and graduated from Hyde Park High School in 1965. After graduating from the University of Illinois in 1967 with a Bachelor of Science degree in biology, he went on to Meharry Medical College where he graduated with an M.D. His postgraduate training in psychiatry was at the Illinois State Psychiatric Institute in Chicago. After his residency he went to the United States Navy from 1974 to 1976 after which he began his career as a community psychiatrist on Chicago's Southside, working in health facilities including Jackson Park Hospital and the Community Mental Health Council, which he helped to build up to a large, comprehensive mental health center, which also advises other nonprofit and public entities focused on mental health through their Institute for Managerial and Clinical Consultation.

During his 35 year long career, Bell has published over 575 articles on mental health and written a book, "Sanity of Survival." He was editor of Psychiatric Perspectives on Violence: Understanding Causes and Issues in Prevention and Treatment; author of Getting Rid of Rats: Perspectives of a Black Community Psychiatrist; co-author of Suicide and Homicide Among Adolescents and chapters on: "Black Psychiatry" in Mental Health and People of Color; "Black-on-Black Homicide" in Mental Health and Mental Illness Among Black Americans; "Isolated Sleep Paralysis" & "Violence Exposure, Psychological Distress and High Risk Behaviors Among Inner-City High School Students" in Anxiety Disorders in African-Americans; "Is psychoanalytic therapy relevant for public mental health programs" in Controversial Issues in Mental Health; and "Prevention of Black Homicide" in The State of Black America 1995. He's the subject of countless interviews in Ebony; Jet; Essence; Emerge; New York Times; Chicago Tribune Magazine; People Magazine; and Chicago Reporter. TV shows, such as "Nightline", "CBS Sunday Morning", "The News Hour with Jim Lehrer," and the "Today Show" have utilized his expert opinion. He's also lectured internationally on various topics.

Bell was a member and former chairman of the National Medical Association's Section on Psychiatry; a Fellow of the American College of Psychiatrists; a Fellow of the American Psychiatric Association, a Founding Member and Past Board Chairman of the National Commission on Correctional Health Care. Bell was the E.Y. Williams Distinguished Senior Clinical Scholar Award of the Section on Psychiatry of the National Medical Association in 1992. He received the American Psychiatric Association President's Commendation - Violence in 1997. He was appointed to the Violence Against Women Advisory Council by Janet Reno the Attorney General Department of Justice and Donna Shalala Secretary Department of Health and Human Services - 1995–2000, and was a participant - White House's Strategy Session on Children, Violence, and Responsibility. He was appointed to the working group for Dr. Satcher's Surgeon General's Report on Mental Health - Culture, Race, and Ethnicity and appointed to the Planning Board for the Surgeon General's Report on Youth Violence.

== Memberships ==
- Member, National Medical Association. Former chairman, Section on Psychiatry.
- Member, Black Psychiatrists of America.
- Former vice-president, former newsletter editor.
- Fellow: American College of Psychiatrists - 1998, Board of Regents - 2006 to 2009. - & American Psychiatric Association - 1985.
- Founding member and past board chairman, National Commission on Correctional Health Care.
- Member and former director, American Association of Community Psychiatrists.
- American Board of Psychiatry and Neurology - 1976; Board Examiner since 1978.

== Awards and recognition ==
- 2006: Carl Bell had become a staple within the community of mental health for over 25 years. This came about from a review of his book, The Sanity of Survival. “Bell’s primal and primary dedication to the African American community is the vehicle through which we all can learn and relearn the basic lesson that good clinical practice must seriously and comprehensively take cultural and ethnic factors into account.” (Moran, para. 5).
- October 2011: The American Psychiatric Association's annual Solomon Carter Fuller Award at APA's 2011 Institute on Psychiatric Services in San Francisco. The award honors “a black citizen who pioneered an area which has significantly benefited the quality of life for black people.”
- May 2012: The American Psychiatric Association's annual Agnes Purcell McGavin Award for Prevention in Child and Adolescent Psychiatry and its Special Presidential Commendation in recognition of his outstanding advocacy for mental illness prevention and for person-centered mental health wellness and recovery
- May 2014: The American Psychiatric Association's Distinguished Service Award
- May 2014: the American Association of Social Psychiatry's Abraham Halpern Humanitarian Award

Honored by The Online Museum of African American Addictions and Recovery Hall of Fame Committee as a 2017 Hall of Fame Recipient, December 30, 2016.

Honored by Marquis Who's Who for Excellence in Mental Health Care, December 9, 2016.

Presented the Distinguished Andrea Delgado, M.D. Memorial Lecture and Honoree at the Black Psychiatrists of America 37th Transcultural Psychiatry Conference – Trans-Generational Outcomes of Marginalization and Racism on Black Mental Health, Nassau, Bahamas, November 11, 2016,

Presented Award for Excellence in Community Involvement – Program for Research on Black Americans, 40th Annual Reunion, Ann Arbor, MI, June 24, 2016,

Presented National Commission on Correctional Healthcare's highest honor - the Bernard P Harrison Award of Merit - in November 2018. This award is presented to an individual or group that has demonstrated excellence and service that has advanced the correctional health care field, either through an individual project or a history of service.

Presented with the American Psychiatric Association's Adolph Meyer Award for Lifetime Achievement in Psychiatric Research, May 2019.

The Carl C. Bell Community Wellness Scholarship and Award was named after Dr. Bell and given to North Lawndale residents who are addressing trauma and showing their commitment to the community by the Trauma Response and Intervention Movement, June 2019.

Presented with the National Medical Association's Scroll of Merit (NMA's Highest Honor), July 2019.
