= Raffaele Garofalo =

Italian politician

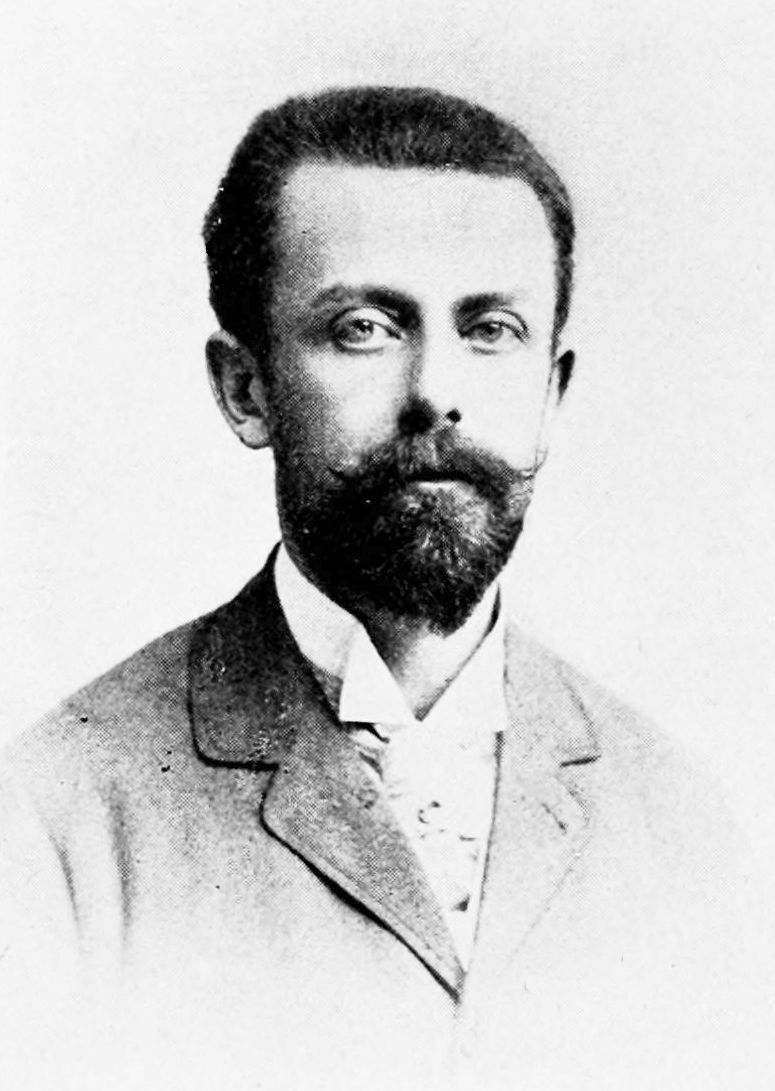
Garofalo in 1897

Raffaele Garofalo (18 November 1851 in Naples – 18 April 1934 in Naples) was an Italian criminologist and jurist.

== Criminology theories ==
He was a student of Cesare Lombroso, often regarded as the father of criminology. He rejected the doctrine of free will (which was the main tenet of the Classical School) and supported the position that crime can be understood only if it is studied by scientific methods. He attempted to formulate a sociological definition of crime that would designate those acts which can be repressed by punishment. These constituted "Natural Crime" and were considered offenses violating the two basic altruistic sentiments common to all people, namely, probity and piety. Crime is an immoral act that is injurious to society. This was more of a psychological orientation than Lombroso's physical-type anthropology.

Garofalo's law of adaptation followed the biological principle of Charles Darwin in terms of adaptation and the elimination of those unable to adapt in a kind of social natural selection. Consequently, he suggested

1. Death for those whose criminal acts grew out of a permanent psychological anomaly, rendering them incapable of social life.
2. Partial elimination or long time imprisonment for those fit only for the life of nomadic hordes or primitive tribes and
3. Enforced reparation on the part of those who lack altruistic sentiments but who have committed their crimes under pressure of exceptional circumstances and are not likely to do so again.

== Works ==
- (1880). Di un Criterio Positivo della Penalità, Napoli: Leonardo Vallardi.
- (1885). Criminologia: Studio sul Delitto, Sulle sue Cause e sui Mezzi di Repressione, Torino, Fratelli Bocca.
- (1886). Polemica in Difesa della Scuola Criminale Positiva, Bologna: Zanichelli [with Cesare Lombroso, Enrico Ferri and Giulio Fioretti].
- (1887). Riparazione Alle Vittime del Delitto, Torino: Bocca.
- (1888). Contro la Corrente! Pensieri Sulla Proposta Abolizione della Pena di Morte nel Progetto del Nuovo Codice Penale Italiano, Napoli: E. Anfossi.
- (1889). Riforma della Procedura Penale in Italia: Progetto in un Nuovo Codice, Torino: Bocca [with Luigi Carelli].
- (1895). La Superstizione Socialista, Torino; Roma: Roux Frassati e C.
- (1907). Idee Sociologiche e Politiche di Dante, Nietzsche e Tolstoi: Studi Seguiti dalla Conferenza Ignoranza e Criminalità al Governo di Parigi nel 1871, Palermo: A. Reber.
- (1911). Metodi Educativi di Civiltà Latina e Britannica, Firenze: Bemporad & Figlio.

Works in English translation

- (1914). Criminology, Boston: Little, Brown & Company.
