= Chicago Area Project =

US juvenile delinquency prevention association

- Formation: 1934; 92 years ago
- Founder: Clifford Shaw
- Headquarters: Chicago, Illinois
- Website: www.chicagoareaproject.org

Chicago Area Project (CAP) is an American juvenile delinquency prevention association based in Chicago, Illinois. The project was founded by University of Chicago criminologist Clifford Shaw in 1934 and was a pioneering community-based delinquency prevention program.

The project started to fight delinquency at "Russell Square" neighborhood of South Chicago during the 1930s and early 1940s.

== History ==
Clifford Shaw was a strong believer that juvenile delinquency in Chicago was due to deteriorating conditions in neighborhoods. Notable sociologists from the University of Chicago and the Illinois Institute for Juvenile Research supported Clifford Shaw. He was doubtful of psychological reasons for delinquency and of associations that strived to improve specific delinquents. As a result, he established CAP as an improved version of a grassroots community organization. CAP sponsored community organizers made up of locals in high-delinquency neighborhoods. Shaw also worked with other existing organizations for example the Catholic church which was in a mainly Polish neighborhood of Russell Square.

Initially, CAP's programs had 3 predominant forms. Firstly, it arranged recreation, the Russell Square Community Committee (RSCC) sponsored athletic clubs. Secondly, it improved neighborhood environments; the RSCC along with community locals created a summer camp and cleaned up community parks. Lastly, it helped delinquents; workers arranged informal guidance sessions for many young gang members. Workers collaborated with police and teachers when young people were having problems in school or were arrested. Furthermore, when neighborhood youth were on parole, CAP leaders supervised them.

In the 1930s there were only 3 community groups, which then grew to 80 in the late 1960s. In a lot of the neighborhoods, helping African Americans and Hispanics succeeded the European ethnic groups who CAP first assisted.

== See also ==
- Organized crime in Chicago
