= List of crime-related publications =

The following is a list of crime-related publications.

== Academic journals ==
- Crime & Delinquency (published by SAGE Publishing)
- Crime and Justice (published by University of Chicago Press)
- Crime, Law and Social Change (published by Springer Science+Business Media)
- Crime Science (published by Springer Science+Business Media)
- International Journal of Law, Crime and Justice (published by Elsevier)
- Journal of Crime and Justice (published by Taylor & Francis)
- Journal of Criminal Justice (published by Elsevier)
- Journal of Research in Crime and Delinquency (published by SAGE Publishing)
- The British Journal of Criminology (published by Oxford University Press)
- The Howard Journal of Crime and Justice (published by Wiley)

== Government publications ==
- Bureau of Justice Statistics Publications
- National Institute of Justice Publications
- Office for Victims of Crime Publications
