= Henry D. McKay =

American sociologist and criminologist

- Born: 1899; Hand County, South Dakota (near Orient)
- Died: 1980 (aged 80–81)
- Education: Dakota Wesleyan University; University of Chicago
- Scientific career
- Fields: Criminology; Sociology
- Institutions: University of Chicago

Henry Donald McKay (1899–1980) was an American sociologist and criminologist who, along with Clifford Shaw, helped to establish the University of Chicago's Sociology Department as the leading program of its kind in the United States.

He and Shaw were both considered members of the Chicago School of sociology. He also collaborated with Shaw on two highly influential studies on juvenile delinquency during the 1930s and 1940s. Shaw and McKay also developed social disorganization theory in a study published in 1942.
