= Freda Stevenson =

British immunologist and academic

Freda K. Stevenson
- Education: University of Oxford; University of Manchester
- Scientific career
- Workplaces: University of Southampton; University of Oxford
- Thesis: Structural studies on polysaccharide-protein complexes from cartilage (1964)

Freda Kathryn Stevenson is a British immunologist and Emerita Professor at the University of Southampton. She was elected a Fellow of the Academy of Medical Sciences in 2000, and was the first British researcher to be awarded the American Society of Hematology Henry M. Stratton Medal.

== Early life and education ==
Stevenson studied biochemistry at the University of Manchester. She earned her bachelor's and master's degree in Manchester, before moving to the University of Oxford for her doctoral research. Stevenson studied polysaccharide-protein complexes from cartilage with Dr Paul Kent from Christchurch College. She stayed at Oxford as a Medical Research Council postdoctoral researcher, where she studied surface proteins in kidneys.

== Research and career ==
Stevenson moved to the University of Southampton, where she looked for new treatments for leukaemia by studying the surface proteins on lymphocytes. She developed sequencing techniques to investigate chronic lymphocytic leukemia, and showed that there were two different types, one of which had a more rapid progression. She showed that it was possible to determine the prognosis of a leukaemia diagnosis by monitoring these surface proteins. This discovery was recognised by the Rai-Binet Medal.

Stevenson became interested in cancer immunology: the use of Immunoglobulin (antibodies) to attack cancer cells. She focussed on a receptor of leukaemic B lymphocytes: a leukaemia-specific protein. She developed anti-idiotype antibodies against cell targets in lymphoma, which was one of the first demonstrations of cancer immunology in research. She was the first to demonstrate that anti-CD38, a monoclonal antibody that binds to the CD38 protein, could be used to treat myeloma. Anti-CD38, which is now named Daratumumab was tested in Stevenson's laboratory, and is now an accepted treatment pathway for patients with myeloma.

Stevenson developed a DNA fusion-gene vaccine that encodes tumour antigens fused to pathogen-derived sequences. The vaccine is targeted against cancer antigens: it activates T cells, which induces and maintains immunity. These vaccines achieve a high level of molecular precision, and immunity amplification can be enhanced through the incorporation of additional genes. Stevenson tested DNA fusion gene vaccines to protect against lymphoma. To activate the immune system; Stevenson used the toxic portion of tetanus toxin, and showed it could induce high levels of antibodies.

In 2018 Stevenson became the first British researcher to win the American Society of Hematology Henry M. Stratton Medal.

== Awards and honours ==
- 2000 Elected Fellow of the Academy of Medical Sciences
- 2014 European Haematology Association Jean Bernard Life Time Achievement Award
- 2015 Rai-Binet Medal
- 2018 American Society of Hematology Henry M. Stratton Medal
- 2020 British Society of Haematology Lifetime Achievement Award

== Select publications ==
- Preliminary studies for an immunotherapeutic approach to the treatment of human myeloma using chimeric anti-CD38 antibody F K Stevenson 1, A J Bell, R Cusack, T J Hamblin, C J Slade, M B Spellerberg, G T Stevenson. Blood. 1991 Mar 1;77(5):1071-9. PMID: 1995092. https://pubmed.ncbi.nlm.nih.gov/1995092/
- Hamblin TJ; Davis Z; Gardiner A; Oscier DG; Stevenson, Freda (1999). "Unmutated Ig V(H) genes are associated with a more aggressive form of chronic lymphocytic leukemia". Blood. 94 (6): 1848–1854. PMID 10477713. Wikidata Q33873343.
- Terry J. Hamblin; Jenny A, Orchard; Rachel E. Ibbotson; Zadie Davis; Thomas, Peter; Stevenson, Freda; David G. Oscier (2002). "CD38 expression and immunoglobulin variable region mutations are independent prognostic variables in chronic lymphocytic leukemia, but CD38 expression may vary during the course of the disease". Blood. 99 (3): 1023–1029. doi:10.1182/blood.v99.3.1023. PMID 11807008. Wikidata Q33956997.
