= Mike Sutton (criminologist) =

British criminology

Michael Robert Sutton (born September 1959, Orpington) is an ex-reader in criminology in the School of Social Sciences at Nottingham Trent University, where he established the now defunct Centre for Study and Reduction of Bias, Prejudice and Hate Crime and is co-founder and chief editor of the Internet Journal of Criminology. He was joint winner of the 1998 British Journal of Criminology Prize for his research on hackers, and publicised the market reduction approach for tackling theft. Sutton has published journal articles on the subject of inter-racial relationships and violence.

== Biography ==
Sutton was born in Orpington in Kent. He enrolled at the University of Central Lancashire for a Bachelor of Arts in law, graduating with BA (Hons.) Law in 1983.

=== Home Office ===
At the UK Government's Home Office, Sutton was a senior research officer, initially in the Department for Research Statistics and Development, and then later in the Policing and Reducing Crime Unit. He was on the team that evaluated the unit fines experiment in the UK, the findings of which led the British Government to implement means-related fines. At a national level the results proved disastrous and the legislation was rapidly repealed following a media outcry. In 1996, he was part of the team that evaluated the £50m Safer Cities Project, finding it cost effective in reducing domestic burglary. With respect to the change in the program by its coordinators, from a programme directed largely towards primary prevention, largely towards implementing more offender-oriented schemes, Pease (1997) quotes from Sutton's 1996 evaluation, "This is a strikingly thought-provoking result, given that the situational measures adopted were subsequently found to have been cost-effective in reducing burglary".

=== Criminology ===
According to the Oxford Handbook of Criminology (2012), Sutton made an early contribution to identifying the, "A priori, economic factors [… f]or a crime to occur", namely the means for converting stolen goods into financial gain,

The capacity to commit crimes of various types will be affected by economic developments. The availability of illegal markets for stolen goods, and the shifting attractiveness of different goods on them, will structure changes in crime patterns (Sutton 1998; Sutton et al. 2001; Fitzgerald et al. 2003; Hallsworth 2005).

personal and social factors in a contemporary adolescent sample, and, for the first time ever in criminology, presents concrete evidence that crime occurs when (and only when) people with specific personal characteristics take part in settings with specific environmental features under specific circumstances.

==== Market Reduction Approach ====
Sutton emphasized the stratagem for crime reduction, by targeting the opportunity to profit from stolen goods and so removing the initial incentive to steal. He called this tactic, the Market Reduction Approach (M.R.A.) and was described as classic research by Marcus Felson, co-innovator along with Lawrence E. Cohen of the routine activity approach to crime rate analysis.

In 1999 Sutton's virtual ethnography of a smart card hacking group was awarded (jointly with David Mann) the British Journal of Criminology annual prize for the article that most significantly contributed to academic knowledge in the field that year. This article influenced the work of UK Government Foresight Panel on Crime in 2000.

Sutton's early research into vandalism identified Peer Status Motivated Vandalism as the seventh sub-type of vandalism that was missing from the typology created by Stanley Cohen. Sutton's sub-type was identified years later by Mathew Williams (criminologist) in an article in the Internet Journal of Criminology as the most suitable explanation for the motivation behind the "virtual vandalism" he studied in a 3D Internet community.

A 2007 Home Office-funded Government research report co-authored by Sutton, Getting the Message Across on the best use of media for reducing racial prejudice and discrimination, found that the UK Government, and many of its departments and funded bodies, have been wasting resources on publicity that could have made the problem worse.

=== Mythbusting ===
Spinach is sometimes wrongly claimed to be a good source of iron. However, this myth is often also wrongly explained by researchers misplacing a decimal mark. Mike Sutton showed that there almost certainly was no decimal error involved in deriving the wrong iron content of spinach. Later analysis also supports the idea that the true reason for the misestimation of the iron content of spinach are "unreliable methods or poor experimentation".

References to this decimal error story often lead back to T. J. Hamblins article "Fake!" in the British Medical Journal from 1981. However, this article is neither the original source nor does it provide any proof or reference for the decimal error story. Mike Suttons inquiry lead T. J. Hamblin to conclude that "even by the turn of the twentieth century errors in earlier measurements were readily apparent without the need to invoke decimal places."

==== Patrick Matthew and natural selection ====
In 2014, Sutton self-published Nullius in Verba: Darwin’s Greatest Secret alleging that Charles Darwin and Alfred Wallace plagiarised the theory of natural selection from Scottish grain merchant and arboriculturist Patrick Matthew. Matthew had published On Naval Timber and Arboriculture in 1831, twenty-eight years before Darwin's On the Origin of Species.

Sutton's claim that Darwin and Wallace plagiarised evolution by natural selection from Matthew was refuted by Joachim Dagg of the Ronin Institute,

[Wallace's] concept of lineage-adaptation as a sequence of extinctions of less fit and survival of fitter varieties and his gradualism put him closer to Darwin than to Matthew. But he emphasized environmental changes for differential extinction and some form of isolation for lineage-splitting and speciation, whereas Darwin's mature theory saw competition as a sufficient cause of divergence, differential extinction, lineage-adaptation and lineage-splitting. This is not to say that Darwin was right in this view and Wallace wrong. By current standards, they were both right and wrong in different respects (competitive vs. environmental selection, sympatric vs. allopatric speciation).

The perspective emerging from this comparison shows at least four unique theories (Matthew, early Darwin, mature Darwin and Wallace), each interesting in its own right. Each theory integrated change in conditions, variability, competition and natural selection in ways that allowed for species transformation somehow. Apart from this similarity, the theories differ significantly from each other in the mechanisms underlying transformation. However, this difference does not lie in the struggle for survival and survival of the fittest, but in the way in which natural selection is integrated with variability, competition and environmental conditions. Transmutation is a convergent result of structurally different mechanisms.

The similarity of Matthew's scheme to the theory of punctuated equilibria is equally superficial. Eldredge & Gould (1972) took Mayr's model of allopatric speciation and combined it with Wright's model of genetic drift in order to explain gaps in the fossil record as results of relatively swift evolutionary change in small and isolated populations. Although catastrophes can produce such populations they are not required, and the mechanism underlying the punctuated record is the drift within small and isolated populations, not the absence of competing species that would prevent species transmutation. Therefore, viewing Matthew (1831) as an anticipator of the theory of punctuated equilibria (e.g. Rampino, 2011) is as wrong as claiming his scheme identical to Darwin's or Wallace's.

Darwin biographer James Moore declared it a "non-issue", and said that "I would be extremely surprised if there was any new evidence had not been already seen and interpreted in the opposite way.".

Sutton's claim that Darwin and Wallace plagiarised evolution by natural selection from Matthew has been refuted through detailed comparison of the competing theories: ironically, they are too dissimilar to share the same origin.
