= Differential association =

Theory in criminology

In criminology, differential association is a theory developed by Edwin Sutherland proposing that through interaction with others, individuals learn the values, attitudes, techniques, and motives for criminal behavior.

The differential association theory is the most talked about of the learning theories of deviance. This theory focuses on how individuals learn to become criminals, but does not concern itself with why they become criminals. Learning Theory is closely related to the interactionist perspective; however, it is not considered so because interactionism focuses on the construction of boundaries in society and persons' perceptions of them.

Learning Theory is considered a positivist approach because it focuses on specific acts, opposed to the more subjective position of social impressions on one's identity, and how those may compel to act. They learn how to commit criminal acts; they learn motives, drives, rationalizations, and attitudes. It grows socially easier for the individuals to commit a crime. Their inspiration is the processes of cultural transmission and construction. Sutherland had developed the idea of the "self" as a social construct, as when a person's self-image is continuously being reconstructed especially when interacting with other people.

Phenomenology and ethnomethodology also encouraged people to debate the certainty of knowledge and to make sense of their everyday experiences using indexicality methods. People define their lives by reference to their experiences, and then generalise those definitions to provide a framework of reference for deciding on future action. From a researcher's perspective, a subject will view the world very differently if employed as opposed to unemployed, if in a supportive family or abused by parents or those close to the individual. However, individuals might respond to the same situation differently depending on how their experience predisposes them to define their current surroundings.

Differential association predicts that an individual will choose the criminal path when the balance of definitions for law-breaking exceeds those for law-abiding. This tendency will be reinforced if social association provides active people in the person's life. Earlier in life the individual comes under the influence of those of high status within that group, the more likely the individual to follow in their footsteps. This does not deny that there may be practical motives for crime. If a person feels hungry but has no money, the temptation to steal will become present. But, the use of "needs" and "values" is equivocal. To a greater or lesser extent, both non-criminal and criminal individuals are motivated by the need for money and social gain.

== Sutherland's theory of differential association ==
The principles of Sutherland's Theory of Differential Association key points:

1. Criminal behavior is learned from other individuals.
2. Criminal behavior is learned in interaction with other persons in a process of communication.
3. The principal part of the learning of criminal behavior occurs within intimate personal groups.
4. When criminal behavior is learned, the learning includes (a) techniques of committing the crime, which are sometimes very complicated, sometimes simple; (b) the specific direction of motives, drives, rationalizations, and attitudes.
5. The specific direction of motives and drives is learned from definitions of the legal codes as favorable or unfavorable.
6. A person becomes delinquent because of an excess of definitions favorable to violation of law over definitions unfavorable to violation of the law.
7. Differential associations may vary in frequency, duration, priority, and intensity.
8. The process of learning criminal behavior by association with criminal and anti-criminal patterns involves all of the mechanisms that are involved in any other learning.
9. While criminal behavior is an expression of general needs and values, it is not explained by those needs and values, since non-criminal behavior is an expression of the same needs and values.

== Explanation ==
An important quality of differential association theory concerns the frequency and intensity of interaction. The amount of time that a person is exposed to a particular definition and at what point the interaction began are both crucial for explaining criminal activity. The process of learning criminal behaviour is really not any different from the process involved in learning any other type of behaviour. Sutherland maintains that there is no unique learning process associated with acquiring non-normative ways of behaving.

One unique aspect of this theory is that the theory purports to explain more than just juvenile delinquency and crime committed by lower-class individuals. Since crime is understood to be learned behaviour, the theory is also applicable to white-collar, corporate, and organized crime.

== Critique ==
One criticism leveled against this theory has to do with the idea that people can be independent, rational actors and individually motivated. This notion of one being a criminal based on their environment is problematic. This theory does not take into account personality traits that might affect a person's susceptibility to these environmental influences.

== See also ==
- Tabula Rasa
