= Criminology =

Field of studies related to crimes

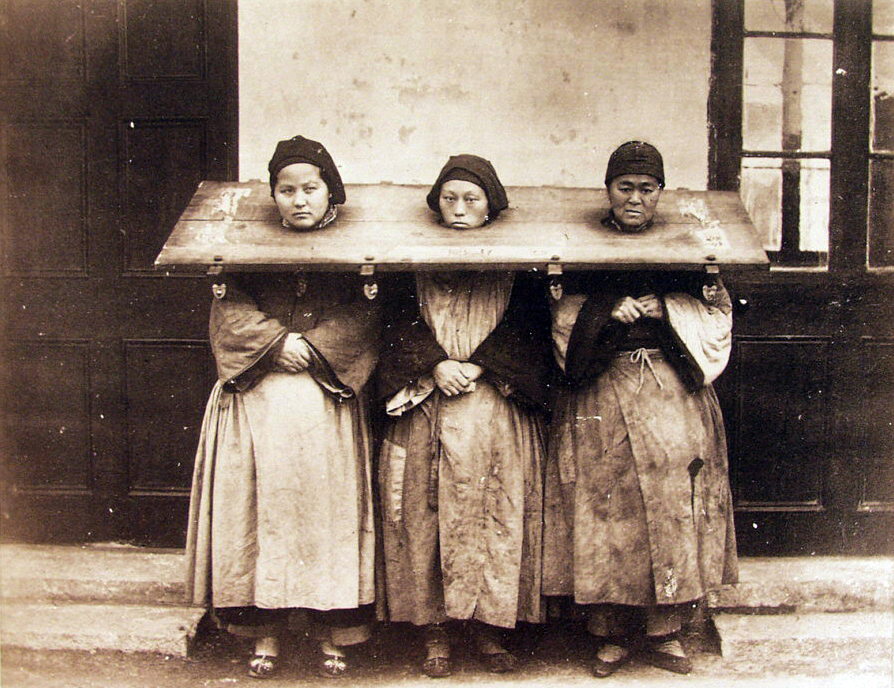
Three women in the pillory, China, 1875

Criminology (from Latin crimen, 'accusation', and Ancient Greek -λογία, -logia, from λόγος logos, 'word, reason') is the interdisciplinary study of crime and deviant behaviour. Criminology is a multidisciplinary field in both the behavioural and social sciences, which draws primarily upon the research of sociologists, political scientists, economists, legal sociologists, psychologists, philosophers, psychiatrists, social workers, biologists, social anthropologists, scholars of law and jurisprudence, as well as the processes that define administration of justice and the criminal justice system.

The interests of criminologists include the study of the nature of crime and criminals, origins of criminal law, etiology of crime, social reaction to crime, and the functioning of law enforcement agencies and the penal institutions. It can be broadly said that criminology directs its inquiries along three lines: first, it investigates the nature of criminal law and its administration and conditions under which it develops; second, it analyzes the causation of crime and the personality of criminals; and third, it studies the control of crime and the rehabilitation of offenders. Thus, criminology encompasses the activities of legislative bodies, law-enforcement agencies, judicial institutions, correctional institutions, and educational, private, and public social agencies.

== History of academic criminology ==
Modern academic criminology has direct roots in the 19th-century Italian School of "criminal anthropology", which, according to the historian Mary Gibson, "caused a radical refocusing of criminological discussion throughout Europe and the United States from law to the criminal. While this 'Italian School' was in turn attacked and partially supplanted in countries such as France by 'sociological' theories of delinquency, they retained the new focus on the criminal." According to Gibson, the term criminology was most likely coined in 1885 by Italian law professor Raffaele Garofalo as Criminologia. In the late 19th century, French anthropologist Paul Topinard used the analogous French term Criminologie.

=== History in the United States ===
In the United States, criminology grew substantially as a discipline in the first quarter of the twentieth century. From 1900 to 2000 this field of research underwent three significant phases in the United States: (1) Golden Age of Research (1900–1930) which has been described as a multiple-factor approach, (2) Golden Age of Theory (1930–1960) which endeavored to show the limits of systematically connecting criminological research to theory, and (3) a 1960–2000 period, which was seen as a significant turning point for criminology. During the post-1960s expansion of higher education, criminology in the United States began to institutionalize outside of sociology, particularly through the rapid development of standalone criminal justice programs. This shift was fueled in part by federal initiatives such as the Law Enforcement Assistance Administration (LEAA) and the Law Enforcement Education Program (LEEP), which provided funding for academic training in policing and corrections during a period of social unrest and concern over crime. These developments strained the long-standing association between sociology and criminology, as many sociologists viewed the new practice-oriented criminal justice programs as academically weaker or less theoretically grounded. In response, some educators split from the American Society of Criminology (ASC) in 1963 to form the International Association of Police Professors (which in 1970 became the Academy of Criminal Justice Sciences (ACJS)), arguing that ASC remained too narrowly sociological in focus.

By the 1990s, the field had moved toward reconciliation, with many programs embracing a dual identity as Criminology/Criminal Justice. Despite early concerns about academic rigor, criminal justice majors became highly popular and financially attractive to universities, sometimes referred to as academic "cash cows." Graduate education also expanded: by the end of the 1990s, there were more than 100 master's-level programs and at least 25 Ph.D. programs in criminology and criminal justice across the country. This institutionalization continued into the 2000s, culminating in the launch of Criminology & Public Policy in 2001, a journal founded by the ASC to bridge theoretical and applied research, with its first editor, Todd Clear, a past president of ACJS.

Criminology is now widely recognized as an interdisciplinary field that integrates insights from sociology, psychology, political science, law, and public health. Although some scholars argue that criminology should remain embedded within sociology to preserve its theoretical foundations, others see disciplinary independence as beneficial for policy relevance and innovation. As of 2020, nearly 50 criminology Ph.D. programs existed in the U.S. and Canada, and the National Research Council has identified criminology as an "emerging discipline" since 2006.

== Early schools of thought ==
There were three main schools of thought in early criminological theory, spanning the period from the mid-18th century to the mid-twentieth century: Classical, Positivist, and Chicago. These schools of thought were superseded by several contemporary paradigms of criminology, such as the sub-culture, control, strain, labelling, critical criminology, cultural criminology, postmodern criminology, feminist criminology, Queer criminology, and others discussed below.

=== Origins and classical school ===
The Classical school arose in the mid-18th century and reflects ideas from utilitarian philosophy. Cesare Beccaria, author of On Crimes and Punishments (1763–64), Jeremy Bentham (inventor of the panopticon), and other early criminological philosophers proposed ideas including:

1. Punishment should be used as a way to deter people from further criminal action. This is premised on the belief that individuals want to maximize pleasure and minimize pain.
2. Punishment should be "public, prompt, necessary, the minimum possible [i.e., no more than necessary for effective deterrence] under the given circumstances, and established by law."
3. Actual harms, not intent, should determine the severity of punishment.

This school developed during a major reform in penology when society began designing prisons for the sake of extreme punishment. This period also saw many legal reforms, the French Revolution, and the development of the legal system in the United States.

=== Positivist ===
The Positivist school argues that criminal behavior stems from internal and external factors beyond the individual's control. Its key method of thought is that criminals are born as criminals and not made into them; this school of thought also supports theory of nature in the debate between nature versus nurture. They also argue that criminal behavior is innate and within a person. Philosophers in this school applied the scientific method to the study of human behavior. Positivism comprises three segments: biological, psychological and social positivism.

Psychological positivism is the view that criminal acts, or the people who commit them, are driven by internal factors.

Social positivism, often referred to as Sociological Positivism, posits that criminals are produced by society. This school claims that low-income levels, high poverty/unemployment rates, and poor educational systems create and motivate criminals.

==== Criminal personality ====
The notion of a criminal personality is derived from the school of thought known as psychological positivism. It essentially means that parts of an individual's personality exhibit traits commonly associated with criminals, such as neuroticism, antisocial tendencies, aggressive behavior, and other factors. There is evidence of correlation, but not causation, between these personality traits and criminal actions.

==== Italian ====
Cesare Lombroso (1835–1909), an Italian sociologist working in the late 19th century, is often called "the father of criminology". He was one of the key contributors to biological positivism and founded the Italian school of criminology. Lombroso took a scientific approach, insisting on empirical evidence for studying crime. He suggested physiological traits such as the measurements of cheekbones or hairline, or a cleft palate could indicate "atavistic" criminal tendencies. This approach, whose influence came via the theory of phrenology and by Charles Darwin's theory of evolution, has been superseded. Enrico Ferri, a student of Lombroso, believed social as well as biological factors played a role, and believed criminals should not be held responsible when factors causing their criminality were beyond their control. Criminologists have since rejected Lombroso's biological theories since control groups were not used in his studies.

==== Sociological positivist ====
Sociological positivism suggests societal factors such as poverty, membership of subcultures, or low levels of education can predispose people to crime. Adolphe Quetelet used data and statistical analysis to study the relationship between crime and sociological factors. He found age, gender, poverty, education, and alcohol consumption were important factors in crime. Lance Lochner performed three different research experiments, each one supporting that education reduces crime. Rawson W. Rawson used crime statistics to suggest a link between population density and crime rates, with crowded cities producing more crime. Joseph Fletcher and John Glyde read papers to the Statistical Society of London on their studies of crime and its distribution. Henry Mayhew used empirical methods and an ethnographic approach to address social questions and poverty, and gave his studies in London Labour and the London Poor. Émile Durkheim viewed crime as an inevitable aspect of a society with uneven distribution of wealth and other differences among people.

==== Differential association (sub-cultural) ====
Differential association (sub-cultural) posits that people learn crime through association. This theory was advocated by Edwin Sutherland, who focused on how "a person becomes delinquent because of an excess of definitions favorable to violation of law over definitions unfavorable to violation of law." Associating with people who may condone criminal conduct, or justify crime under specific circumstances, makes one more likely to take that view, under his theory. Interacting with this type of "antisocial" peer is a major cause of delinquency. Reinforcing criminal behavior makes it chronic. Where there are criminal subcultures, many individuals learn crime, and crime rates swell in those areas.

=== Chicago ===
The Chicago school arose in the early twentieth century, through the work of Robert E. Park, Ernest Burgess, and other urban sociologists at the University of Chicago. In the 1920s, Park and Burgess identified five concentric zones that often emerge as cities grow, including the "zone of transition", which was considered the most volatile and prone to disorder. In the 1940s, Henry McKay and Clifford R. Shaw focused on juvenile delinquents, finding that they were concentrated in the zone of transition. The Chicago School was a school of thought that developed and attributed human behavior to social structures. This thought can be associated with, or used in, criminology because it essentially takes the stance of defending criminals and their behavior. The defense and argument rest on the idea that these people and their actions are not their fault but the result of societal conditions (e.g., unemployment, poverty), and that they are, in fact, behaving properly.

Chicago school sociologists adopted a social ecology approach to studying cities. They postulated that urban neighborhoods with high levels of poverty often experience a breakdown in the social structure and institutions, such as family and schools. This results in social disorganization, which reduces these institutions' ability to control behavior and creates an environment ripe for deviant behavior.

Other researchers suggested an added social-psychological link. Edwin Sutherland suggested that people learn criminal behavior from older, more experienced criminals with whom they may associate.

Theoretical perspectives used in criminology include psychoanalysis, functionalism, interactionism, Marxism, econometrics, systems theory, postmodernism, behavioural genetics, personality psychology, evolutionary psychology, etc.

== Other schools of thought ==
=== Social structure theories ===
This theory is applied to a variety of approaches within the bases of criminology, in particular, and in sociology more generally as a conflict theory or structural conflict perspective in sociology and sociology of crime. This perspective is broad enough to embrace a diversity of positions.

==== Disorganization ====
Social disorganization theory is based on the work of Henry McKay and Clifford R. Shaw of the Chicago School. Social disorganization theory postulates that neighborhoods plagued with poverty and economic deprivation tend to experience high rates of population turnover. This theory suggests that crime and deviance are valued within groups in society, 'subcultures' or 'gangs'. These groups have different values from the social norm. These neighborhoods also tend to have high population heterogeneity. With high turnover, informal social structure often fails to develop, which in turn makes it difficult to maintain social order in a community.

==== Social ecology ====
Since the 1950s, social ecology studies have built on the social disorganization theories. Many studies have found that crime rates are associated with poverty, disorder, high numbers of abandoned buildings, and other signs of community deterioration. As working and middle-class people leave deteriorating neighborhoods, the most disadvantaged portions of the population may remain. William Julius Wilson suggested a poverty "concentration effect", which may cause neighborhoods to be isolated from the mainstream of society and become prone to violence.

==== Strain ====
Strain theory, also known as Mertonian Anomie, advanced by American sociologist Robert Merton, suggests that mainstream culture, especially in the United States, is saturated with dreams of opportunity, freedom, and prosperity—as Merton put it, the American Dream. Most people buy into this dream, and it becomes a powerful cultural and psychological motivator. Merton also used the term anomie, but it meant something slightly different for him than it did for Durkheim. Merton saw the term as meaning a dichotomy between what society expected of its citizens and what those citizens could actually achieve. Therefore, if the social structure of opportunities is unequal and prevents the majority from realizing the dream, some of those dejected will turn to illegitimate means (crime) to realize it. Others will retreat or drop out into deviant subcultures (such as gang members, or what he calls "hobos"). Robert Agnew developed this theory further to include types of strain which were not derived from financial constraints. This is known as general strain theory.

==== Subcultural ====
Following the Chicago school and strain theory, and also drawing on Edwin Sutherland's idea of differential association, sub-cultural theorists focused on small cultural groups fragmenting away from the mainstream to form their own values and meanings about life.

Albert K. Cohen tied anomie theory with Sigmund Freud's reaction formation idea, suggesting that delinquency among lower-class youths is a reaction against the social norms of the middle class. Some youth, especially from poorer areas where opportunities are scarce, might adopt social norms specific to those places that may include "toughness" and disrespect for authority. Criminal acts may result when youths conform to norms of the deviant subculture.

Richard Cloward and Lloyd Ohlin suggested that delinquency can result from a differential opportunity for lower-class youth. Such youths may be tempted to take up criminal activities, choosing an illegitimate path that provides them more lucrative economic benefits than conventional, over legal options such as minimum wage-paying jobs available to them.

Delinquency tends to occur among lower-working-class males who lack resources and live in impoverished areas, as extensively noted by Albert Cohen (Cohen, 1965). Bias has been known to occur among law enforcement agencies, where officers tend to place a bias on minority groups, without knowing for sure if they had committed a crime or not.

British sub-cultural theorists focused more heavily on the issue of class, where some criminal activities were seen as "imaginary solutions" to the problem of belonging to a subordinate class. A further study by the Chicago school examined gangs and the influence of interactions among gang leaders, observed by adults.

Sociologists such as Raymond D. Gastil have explored the impact of a Southern culture of honor on violent crime rates.

==== Control ====
Another approach is made by the social bond or social control theory. Instead of looking for factors that make people become criminals, these theories try to explain why people do not become criminals. Travis Hirschi identified four main characteristics: "attachment to others", "belief in moral validity of rules", "commitment to achievement", and "involvement in conventional activities". The more a person features those characteristics, the less likely they are to become deviant (or criminal). On the other hand, if these factors are not present, a person is more likely to become a criminal. Hirschi expanded on this theory by proposing that a person with low self-control is more likely to become a criminal. Unlike most criminology theories, these do not look at why people commit crimes but rather at why they do not.

A simple example: Someone wants a big yacht but does not have the means to buy one. If the person cannot exercise self-control, they might try to obtain the yacht (or the means to do so) illegally. In contrast, someone with high self-control will (more likely) wait, deny themselves what they want, or seek an intelligent intermediate solution, such as joining a yacht club to use a yacht through the group's consolidated resources without violating social norms.

Social bonds, through peers, parents, and others can have a countering effect on one's low self-control. For families of low socio-economic status, a factor that distinguishes families with delinquent children, from those who are not delinquent, is the control exerted by parents or chaperonage. In addition, theorists such as David Matza and Gresham Sykes argued that criminals can temporarily neutralize internal moral and social-behavioral constraints through techniques of neutralization.

==== Psychoanalytic ====
Psychoanalysis is a psychological theory (and therapy) which regards the unconscious mind, repressed memories, and trauma, as the key drivers of behavior, especially deviant behavior. Sigmund Freud discussed how the unconscious desire for pain relates to psychoanalysis in his essay, Beyond the Pleasure Principle. Freud suggested that unconscious impulses such as 'repetition compulsion' and a 'death drive' can dominate a person's creativity, leading to self-destructive behavior. Phillida Rosnick, in the article Mental Pain and Social Trauma, posits a difference in the thoughts of individuals suffering traumatic unconscious pain, which corresponds to them having thoughts and feelings that are not reflections of their true selves. There is enough correlation between this altered state of mind and criminality to suggest causation. Sander Gilman, in the article Freud and the Making of Psychoanalysis, looks for evidence in the physical mechanisms of the human brain and the nervous system and suggests there is a direct link between an unconscious desire for pain or punishment and the impulse to commit crime or deviant acts.

=== Symbolic interactionism ===
Symbolic interactionism draws on the phenomenology of Edmund Husserl and George Herbert Mead, as well as subcultural theory and conflict theory. This school of thought focused on the relationship between state, media, and conservative-ruling elite and other less powerful groups. The powerful groups could become the "significant other" in the less powerful groups' processes of generating meaning. The former could, to some extent, impose their meanings on the latter; therefore, they were able to "label" minor delinquent youngsters as criminals. These youngsters would often take the label on board, be more readily inclined to crime, and become actors in the "self-fulfilling prophecy" of powerful groups. Later developments in this set of theories were by Howard Becker and Edwin Lemert, in the mid-20th century. Stanley Cohen developed the concept of "moral panic" describing the societal reaction to spectacular, alarming social phenomena (e.g. post-World War 2 youth cultures like the Mods and Rockers in the UK in 1964, AIDS epidemic and football hooliganism).

=== Labeling theory ===
Labeling theory refers to an individual who is labeled by others in a particular way. The theory was studied in great detail by Becker. It was originally derived from sociology, but is regularly used in criminological studies. When someone is labeled a criminal, they may accept or reject the label and continue to commit crimes. Even those who initially reject the label can eventually accept it as it becomes better known, particularly among their peers. This stigma can become even more profound when the labels are about deviancy, and it is thought that this stigmatization can lead to deviancy amplification. Malcolm Klein conducted a study that showed labeling theory affected some youth offenders but not others.

=== Traitor theory ===
At the other side of the spectrum, criminologist Lonnie Athens developed a theory about how a process of brutalization by parents or peers that usually occurs in childhood results in violent crimes in adulthood. Richard Rhodes' Why They Kill describes Athens' observations about domestic and societal violence in the criminals' backgrounds. Both Athens and Rhodes reject the genetic inheritance theories.

=== Rational choice theory ===
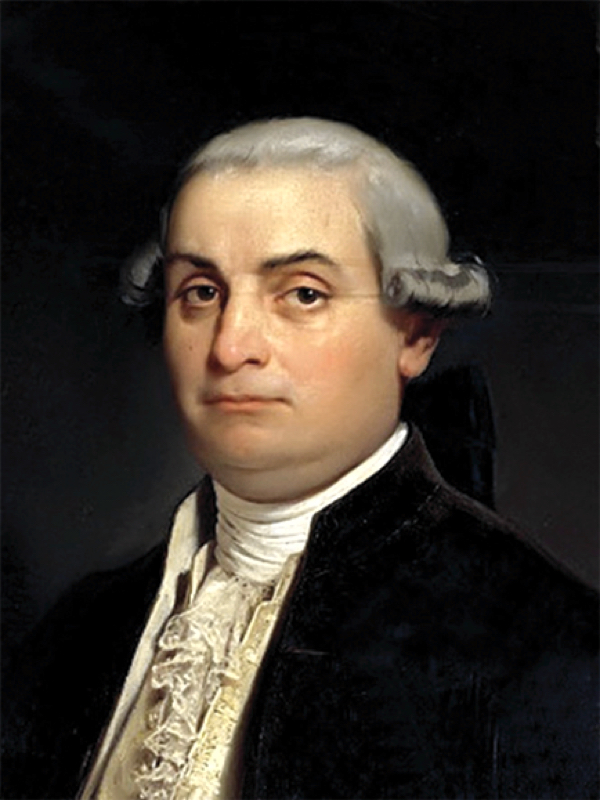
Cesare Beccaria

Rational choice theory is based on the utilitarian, classical school philosophies of Cesare Beccaria, which were popularized by Jeremy Bentham. They argued that punishment, if certain, swift, and proportionate to the crime, was a crime deterrent, with the risks outweighing any possible benefits to the offender. In Dei delitti e delle pene (On Crimes and Punishments, 1763–1764), Beccaria advocated a rational penology. Beccaria conceived of punishment as the necessary application of the law for a crime; thus, the judge was to confirm their sentence to the law. Beccaria also distinguished between crime and sin, and advocated against the death penalty, as well as torture and inhumane treatments, as he did not consider them as rational deterrents.

This philosophy was replaced by the positivist and Chicago schools and was not revived until the 1970s with the writings of James Q. Wilson, Gary Becker's 1965 article Crime and Punishment and George Stigler's 1970 article The Optimum Enforcement of Laws. Rational choice theory argues that criminals, like other people, weigh costs or risks and benefits when deciding whether to commit crime and think in economic terms. They will also try to minimize risks of crime by considering the time, place, and other situational factors.

Becker, for example, acknowledged that many people operate under high moral and ethical constraints but argued that criminals rationally see that the benefits of their crime outweigh the costs, such as the probability of apprehension and conviction, the severity of punishment, and their current set of opportunities. From the public policy perspective, since the cost of increasing the fine is marginal to that of increasing surveillance, one can conclude that the best policy is to maximize the fine and minimize surveillance.

With this perspective, crime prevention or reduction measures can be devised to increase the effort required to commit the crime, such as target hardening. Rational choice theories also suggest that increasing risk and likelihood of being caught, through added surveillance, law enforcement presence, added street lighting, and other measures, are effective in reducing crime.

One of the main differences between this theory and Bentham's rational choice theory, is that Bentham considered it possible to annihilate crime through the panopticon, whereas Becker's theory acknowledged that a society could not eradicate crime beneath a certain level. For example, if 25% of a supermarket's products were stolen, it would be very easy to reduce this rate to 15%, quite easy to reduce it until 5%, difficult to reduce it under 3% and nearly impossible to reduce it to zero (a feat which the measures required would cost the supermarket so much that it would outweigh the benefits). This reveals that the goals of utilitarianism and classical liberalism have to be tempered and reduced to more modest proposals to be practically applicable.

Such rational choice theories, linked to neoliberalism, have been at the basics of crime prevention through environmental design and underpin the Market Reduction Approach to theft by Mike Sutton, which is a systematic toolkit for those seeking to focus attention on "crime facilitators" by tackling the markets for stolen goods that motivate for thieves to supply them by theft.

=== Routine activity theory ===
Routine activity theory, developed by Marcus Felson and Lawrence Cohen, draws on control theories and explains crime in terms of opportunities for crime that arise in everyday life. A crime opportunity requires that elements converge in time and place, including a motivated offender, a suitable target or victim, and a lack of a capable guardian. A guardian at a place, such as a street, could include security guards or even ordinary pedestrians who would witness the criminal act and possibly intervene or report it to law enforcement. Routine activity theory was expanded by John Eck, who added a fourth element of "place manager", such as rental property managers who can take nuisance abatement measures.

=== Biosocial theory ===
Biosocial criminology is an interdisciplinary field that seeks to explain crime and antisocial behavior by examining biological and environmental factors. While sociological theories have dominated contemporary criminology, biosocial criminology also recognizes the potential contributions of fields such as behavioral genetics, personality psychology, and evolutionary psychology. Various theoretical frameworks such as evolutionary neuroandrogenic theory have sought to explain trends in criminality through the lens of evolutionary biology. Specifically, they seek to explain why criminality is so much higher in men than in women and why young men are most likely to exhibit criminal behavior.

Aggressive behavior has been associated with abnormalities in three principal regulatory systems in the body: serotonin systems, catecholamine systems, and the hypothalamic-pituitary-adrenocortical axis. Abnormalities in these systems are also known to be induced by stress, either severe, acute stress or chronic low-grade stress.

Biosocial approaches remain very controversial within the scientific field.

=== Marxist ===
In 1968, young British sociologists formed the National Deviance Conference (NDC) group. The group, restricted to academics, consisted of 300 members. Ian Taylor, Paul Walton, and Jock Young – members of the NDC – rejected previous explanations of crime and deviance. Thus, they decided to pursue a new Marxist criminological approach. In The New Criminology, they argued against the biological "positivism" perspective represented by Lombroso, Hans Eysenck and Gordon Trasler.

According to the Marxist perspective on crime, "defiance is normal – the sense that men are now consciously involved ... in assuring their human diversity." Thus, Marxist criminologists argued for a society in which the facts of human diversity, whether social or personal, would not be criminalized. They further attributed the processes of crime creation not to genetic or psychological facts, but rather to the material basis of a given society.

State crime is a distinct category of crimes studied by Marxist criminology, which considers these crimes among the most costly to society in terms of overall harm/injury. In a Marxist framework, genocides, environmental degradation, and war are not crimes that occur out of contempt for one's fellow man, but are crimes of power. They continue systems of control and hegemony which allow state crime and state-corporate crime, along with state-corporate non-profit criminals, to continue governing people.

=== Convict ===
Convict criminology is a school of thought in the realm of criminology. Convict criminologists have been directly affected by the criminal justice system, oftentimes having spent years inside the prison system. Researchers in the field of convict criminology, such as John Irwin and Stephan Richards, argue that traditional criminology can be better understood by those who lived within prison walls. Martin Leyva argues that "prisonization" oftentimes begins before prison, in the home, community, and schools.

According to Rod Earle, Convict Criminology began in the United States following the major expansion of prisons in the 1970s, and the U.S. remains the primary focus for those who study convict criminology.

=== Queer ===
Queer criminology is a field of study that focuses on LGBT individuals and their interactions with the criminal justice system. The goals of this field of study are as follows:

- To better understand the history of LGBT individuals and the laws put against the community
- Why LGBT citizens are incarcerated and if or why they are arrested at higher rates than heterosexual and cisgender individuals
- How queer activists have fought against oppressive laws that criminalized LGBT individuals
- To conduct research and use it as a form of activism through education

Legitimacy of queer criminology:

The value of pursuing criminology from a queer theorist perspective is contested; some believe that it is not worth researching and not relevant to the field as a whole, and as a result, it is a subject that lacks a wide range of research available. On the other hand, it could be argued that this subject is highly valuable in highlighting how LGBT individuals are affected by the criminal justice system. This research also has the opportunity to "queer" the curriculum of criminology in educational institutions by shifting the focus from controlling and monitoring LGBT communities to liberating and protecting them.

As more and more people identify as something other than heterosexual, queer criminology continues to grow in relevance. At the same time, in jurisdictions such as Russia, Uganda, and Ghana, governments have become even more punitive through laws that expand the criminalization of LGBTQ+ conduct, relationships, and organizing. 'Digiqueer criminology' has emerged as a sub-discipline of queer criminology and aims to deepen understanding of the relationship between digital technology, LGBTQ+ identity, and justice.

=== Cultural ===
Cultural criminology views crime and its control within the context of culture. Ferrell believes criminologists can examine the actions of criminals, control agents, media producers, and others to construct the meaning of crime. He discusses these actions as a means to show the dominant role of culture. Kane adds that cultural criminology has three tropes: village, city street, and media, in which males can be geographically influenced by society's views on what is broadcast and accepted as right or wrong. The village is where one engages in available social activities. Linking an individual's history to a location can help determine social dynamics. The city street involves positioning oneself in the cultural area. This is full of those affected by poverty, poor health, and crime, and large buildings that impact the city but not the neighborhoods. Mass media gives an all-around account of the environment and the possible other subcultures that could exist beyond a specific geographical area.

It was later that Naegler and Salman introduced feminist theory to cultural criminology and discussed masculinity and femininity, sexual attraction and sexuality, and intersectional themes. Naegler and Salman believed that Ferrell's mold was limited and that they could add to the understanding of cultural criminology by studying women and those who do not fit Ferrell's mold. Hayward would later add that not only feminist theory, but green theory as well, played a role in the cultural criminology theory through the lens of adrenaline, the soft city, the transgressive subject, and the attentive gaze. The adrenaline lens deals with rational choice and what causes a person to have their own terms of availability, opportunity, and low levels of social control. The soft city lens deals with reality outside of the city and the imaginary sense of reality: the world where transgression occurs, where rigidity is slanted, and where rules are bent. The transgressive subject refers to a person who is attracted to rule-breaking and is attempting to be themselves in a world where everyone is against them. The attentive gaze is when someone, mainly an ethnographer, is immersed into the culture and interested in lifestyle(s) and the symbolic, aesthetic, and visual aspects. When examined, they are left with the knowledge that they are not all the same, but they come to a settlement to live together in the same space. Through it all, the sociological perspective on cultural criminology theory attempts to understand how the environment an individual is in determines their criminal behavior.

=== Relative deprivation ===
Relative deprivation involves the process where an individual measures their own well-being and materialistic worth against that of other people and perceives that they are worse off in comparison. When humans fail to obtain what they believe they are owed, they can experience anger or jealousy over the notion that they have been wrongly disadvantaged.

Relative deprivation was originally used in sociology by Samuel A. Stouffer, a pioneer of the theory. Stouffer revealed that soldiers fighting in World War II measured their personal success by the experience in their units rather than by the standards set by the military. Relative deprivation can be made up of societal, political, economic, or personal factors that create a sense of injustice. It is not based on absolute poverty, a condition where one cannot meet a necessary level to maintain basic living standards. Rather, relative deprivation holds that even if a person is financially stable, they can still feel relatively deprived. The perception of relative deprivation can lead to criminal behavior and/or morally problematic decisions. Relative deprivation theory has increasingly been used to partially explain crime as rising living standards can result in rising crime levels. In criminology, the theory of relative deprivation explains that people who feel jealous and discontented with others might turn to crime to acquire things they cannot afford.

=== Rural ===
Rural criminology is the study of crime trends outside of metropolitan and suburban areas. Rural criminologists have used social disorganization and routine activity theories. The FBI Uniform Crime Report shows that rural communities have significantly different crime trends than metropolitan and suburban areas. The crime in rural communities consists predominantly of narcotic-related crimes such as the production, use, and trafficking of narcotics. Social disorganization theory is used to examine the trends involving narcotics. Social disorganization leads to narcotic use in rural areas because of low educational opportunities and high unemployment rates. Routine activity theory is used to examine all low-level street crimes, such as theft. Much of the crime in rural areas is explained through routine activity theory because there is often a lack of capable guardians in rural areas.

=== Epidemiological criminology ===
Epidemiological criminology, sometimes abbreviated as EpiCrim, is an interdisciplinary approach that applies concepts and methods from epidemiology and public health to the study of crime, violence, victimization, and criminal justice involvement. Traditional criminology studies crime, criminal behavior, victimization, punishment, and society's responses to crime. Epidemiological criminology keeps those concerns but adds population-level questions common in epidemiology, including who is affected, where patterns occur, what risk or protective factors are present, and how prevention efforts can be evaluated. The approach has been described as a way to connect criminology, criminal justice, public health, epidemiology, public policy, and law. Other works have used epidemiological criminology to frame public health and crime education partnerships and to describe crime as a problem of the social body. It is especially relevant to topics where crime and health overlap, including violence prevention, substance abuse, offender and victim health, and the health effects of criminal justice involvement. Epidemiological criminology is therefore best understood not as a replacement for traditional criminology, but as a prevention-oriented extension of it.

=== Public ===
Public criminology is a strand within criminology closely tied to ideas associated with "public sociology", focused on disseminating criminological insights to a broader audience than academia. Advocates of public criminology argue that criminologists should be "conducting and disseminating research on crime, law, and deviance in dialogue with affected communities." Its goal is for academics and researchers in criminology to provide their research to the public to inform public decisions and policymaking. This allows criminologists to avoid the constraints of traditional criminological research. In doing so, public criminology takes on many forms, including media and policy advising as well as activism, civic-oriented education, community outreach, expert testimony, and knowledge co-production.

=== Ultra-realism ===
Ultra-realism is a 21st-century theoretical school and research programme that straddles criminology and zemiology. Ultra-realists revisit the fundamental question that underpins both disciplines: why, rather than seeking solidarity and cooperation, do specific individuals, groups, or institutions choose to risk harming others in pursuit of their own interests? Early proponents of the ultra-realist perspective are Steve Hall and Simon Winlow. The original ultra-realist concepts of the pseudo-pacification process, special liberty, and objectless anxiety first emerged from the mid-1990s onwards in a series of articles and books. The ultra-realist framework began to take a clearly defined shape in three later works.

Ultra-realist researchers operate in research fields such as deviant leisure and consumer culture; crime, harm and place; crime, harm, work and employment; Covid, lockdown and social harm; riots and far-right politics; violence and masculinity; crime, harm and glocal markets; policing and corruption; homicide and serial murder; crime, harm and mass media; crime, corruption and compliance; history and violence; crime, corruption and sport; hate crime; technology, harm and crime; the crime decline; child abuse; military studies; subjectivity and investment fraud; crime, harm and drugs; the criminology of borders.

== Types and definitions of crime ==
Both the positivist and classical schools take a consensus view of crime: that a crime is an act that violates society's basic values and beliefs. Those values and beliefs are manifested as laws that society agrees upon. However, there are two types of laws:

- Natural laws are rooted in core values shared by many cultures. Natural laws protect against harm to persons (e.g., murder, rape, assault) or property (theft, larceny, robbery), and form the basis of common law systems.
- Statutes are enacted by legislatures and reflect current cultural mores, albeit that some laws may be controversial, e.g., laws that prohibit cannabis use and gambling. Marxist criminology, conflict criminology, and critical criminology claim that most relationships between state and citizens are non-consensual and, as such, criminal law is not necessarily representative of public beliefs and wishes: it is exercised in the interests of the ruling or dominant class. The more right-wing criminologies tend to posit that there is a consensual social contract between state and citizen.

There have been moves in contemporary criminological theory to move away from liberal pluralism, culturalism, and postmodernism by introducing the universal term "harm" into the criminological debate as a replacement for the legal term "crime".

== Subtopics ==
Areas of study in criminology include:

- Comparative criminology, which is the study of the social phenomenon of crime across cultures, to identify differences and similarities in crime patterns.
- Crime prevention
- Crime statistics
- Criminal behavior
- Criminal careers and desistance
- Domestic violence
- Deviant behavior
- Evaluation of criminal justice agencies
- Fear of crime
- The International Crime Victims Survey
- Juvenile delinquency
- Penology
- Police science
- Sociology of law
- Victimology

== See also ==
- Anthropological criminology
- Crime science
- Forensic psychology
- Forensic science
- List of crime-related publications
- List of criminologists
- Social cohesion
- The Mask of Sanity
- Taboo
- Public criminology
- Qualitative research in criminology
- Quantitative methods in criminology
- Zemiology
