= Edwin Sutherland =

American criminologist (1883–1950)

Edwin H. Sutherland
- Edwin Sutherland, known for the concept "white collar crime"
- Born: August 13, 1883; Gibbon, Nebraska
- Died: October 11, 1950 (aged 67); Bloomington, Indiana
- Education: University of Chicago
- Scientific career
- Fields: Sociology
- Workplaces: University of Illinois; University of Minnesota; Indiana University

Edwin Hardin Sutherland (August 13, 1883 – October 11, 1950) was an American sociologist. He is considered one of the most influential criminologists of the 20th century. He was a sociologist of the symbolic interactionist school of thought and is best known for defining white-collar crime and differential association, a general theory of crime and delinquency. Sutherland earned his Ph.D. in sociology from the University of Chicago in 1913.

== Early life ==
He was born in Gibbon, Nebraska. He graduated with an A.B. degree from Grand Island College in Nebraska in 1904. Afterwards, he was a high school teacher and teacher at University of Sioux Falls. He completed a PhD at the University of Chicago in 1913.

== Academic career ==
After receiving his PhD from the University of Chicago, Sutherland was at William Jewell College, Missouri (1913–1919), the University of Kansas (the summer of 1918), University of Illinois (1919–1925), Sutherland spent a summer at Northwestern (June–August 1922) prior to arriving at the University of Minnesota in 1925.

Sutherland solidified his reputation as one of the country's leading criminologists at the University of Minnesota, where he worked from 1926 to 1929. During this period, he concentrated in sociology as a scientific enterprise whose goal was to understand and control social problems. For several months in 1929 Sutherland studied the British penal system while in England. Also, during 1929–1930 Sutherland worked as a researcher with the Bureau of Social Hygiene in New York City. In 1930, Sutherland accepted a position as a research professor at the University of Chicago. In 1935 he took a position at Indiana University, where he remained till his untimely death on October 11, 1950. He founded the Bloomington School of Criminology at Indiana University.

During his time at Indiana, he published four books, including Twenty Thousand Homeless Men (1936), The Professional Thief (1937), the third edition of Principles of Criminology (1939), and the censored first edition of White Collar Crime (1949), his masterpiece. It remained censored until the original text was published in 1983 by Yale University Press.

Sutherland was elected president of the American Sociological Society in 1939, and president of the Sociological Research Association in 1940. If he had not already become prominent within the sociological profession prior to his introduction of the concept of white-collar crime in 1939, one can only speculate whether the seminal concept would have been published, as America's largest corporations threatened to sue the publishers of White Collar Crime. (They were successful, and had all references to the names of litigating corporations removed from the text.) When Yale University Press issued the unexpurgated version in 1983, the introduction by Gilbert Geis noted that Sutherland's concept of white-collar crime "altered the study of crime throughout the world in fundamental ways".

=== Theory ===
He was the author of the leading text Criminology, published in 1924, first stating the principle of differential association in the third edition retitled Principles of Criminology (1939:4–8) that the development of habitual patterns of criminality arise from association with those who commit crime rather than with those who do not commit crime. According to Sutherland, individuals learn definitions both favorable and unfavorable to crime from peers, the strength of their relationship determines if they choose to favor anti-criminal or pro-criminal definitions. Within differential association theory, Sutherland explains that criminal behavior can be learned through peer interaction with older people or more experienced criminals. The amount of time spent with peers who associate themselves with deviance leads to a greater chance of engaging in deviance. Sutherland discussed that the intensity of an individual will also determine if a person will agree with their pro-criminal definitions. The type of feelings an individual associates with someone will help determine if they will follow their definitions, whether they advocate for crime or not. Not every child raised in an environment surrounded by crime will develop into having criminal tendencies. Instead Sutherland's theory suggests that having strong bonds to positive role models increases the chance someone stays away from crime. The theory also had a structural element positing that conflict and social disorganization are the underlying causes of crime because they the patterns of people associated with. This latter element was dropped when the fourth edition was published in 1947.

He remained convinced that social class was a relevant factor, coining the phrase white-collar criminal in a speech to the American Sociological Association on December 27, 1939. In his 1949 monograph White-Collar Criminology he defined a white-collar crime "approximately as a crime committed by a person of respectability and high social status in the course of his occupation." The first two publications, in 1949 and in 1961, were heavily censored omitting names and an entire chapter. It wasn't until the publication in 1983 by Yale University Press the original uncensored version was made available. Differential Association has been one of the most cited criminological theories since it is applicable for many situations and behavior.

== Works ==
- Sutherland, Edwin H. (1924) Principles of Criminology, Chicago: University of Chicago Press.
- Sutherland, Edwin H. (1936) With Locke, H.J. Twenty Thousand Homeless Men: a study of unemployed men in the Chicago shelters, Philadelphia: J.B. Lippincott
- Conwell, Chic (1937). Sutherland, Edwin H. (ed.). The Professional Thief: by a Professional Thief. Annotated and Interpreted by Edwin H. Sutherland. Chicago: University of Chicago Press. LCCN 37036112.
- Sutherland, Edwin H. (1942) Development of the Theory, in Karl Schuessler (ed.) Edwin H. Sutherland on Analyzing Crime, pp. 13–29. Chicago: University of Chicago Press.
- Sutherland, Edwin H. (1949) White Collar Crime, New York: Holt, Rinehart & Winston.
- Sutherland, Edwin H. (1950) The Diffusion of Sexual Psychopath Laws. American Journal of Sociology, Issue 56: pp. 142–148

== See also ==
- Organi-cultural Deviance
