= Index of criminology articles =

Articles related to criminology and law enforcement.

== A ==
acquittal – addiction – age of consent – age of criminal responsibility – aging offender – allocute – alloplastic adaptation – American Academy of Forensic Sciences – animal abuse – animus nocendi – anomie theory – answer (law) – anthropometry – antisocial behaviour order – antisocial personality disorder – arson – ASBO – asocial personality – assassination – assault – assault causing bodily harm – assault occasioning actual bodily harm – asset forfeiture – automatism – autoplastic adaptation – autopsy

== B ==
ballistics – battered child syndrome – battered woman syndrome – battery – behavior theory – Jeremy Bentham – Alphonse Bertillon – binge drinking – biosocial criminology – blackmail – blunt force trauma – bodily harm – body cavity search – born criminal – breaking and entering – British Society of Criminology - Zebulon Reed Brockway – broken windows thesis – burglary

== C ==
capital punishment – carjacking – case law – causes and correlates of crime – celerity – chain of custody – chemical castration – child abuse – child neglect – child sexual abuse – chronic mentally ill offender – civil law – clandestine abuse – classical school of criminology – closed-circuit television – cohort analysis – community policing – community service – compulsive gambling – computational criminology – computer abuse – computer bulletin board – computer crime – computer forensics – computer-related crime – conflict perspective – consensual crime – consensus model (criminal justice) – conspiracy – constitutive criminology – contact rapist – conviction rate – coroner – corporal punishment – correctional psychology – counterfeiting – CPTED – crime – crime against humanity – crime index – crime mapping – crime of passion – crime rate – crime statistics – criminal anthropology – criminal homicide – criminal insanity – criminal justice – criminal justice system – criminal law – criminal negligence – criminal record – criminal tattoos – criminal threatening – criminalistics – criminalization – criminaloid – criminology – criminology of place – critical criminology – culture conflict – cycle of violence

== D ==
dangerous drug – dangerousness – date-rape drug – Daubert Standard – death penalty – deconstructionist theories – decriminalization – defense of justification – defensible space – detective – deterrence – deterrence strategy – deviance – differential association – domestic violence – double jeopardy – dramaturgical perspective – drug possession – drug-defined crime – drug-related crime – drunk driving – DUI – Durham rule

== E ==
ecological theory – elder abuse – embezzlement – enforcement discretion – environmental crime – environmental criminology – espionage – ethnic succession – evidence collection – exile – expert witness – external validity – extortion

== F ==
family violence – fear of crime – federal inmate – federal interest computer – felony – feminist criminology – fentanyl – Enrico Ferri – Fifth Amendment rights of witnesses – fine – fingerprint – first degree murder – focal concern – forcible rape – forensic accounting – forensic anthropology – forensic ballistics – forensic engineering – forensic entomology – forensic evidence – forensic genetics – forensic odontology – forensic palynology – forensic pathology – forensic psychiatry – forensic psychology – forensic science – forensic toxicology – forgery – Willie Francis – fraud – frustration-aggression theory

== G ==
gamma hydroxybutyrate – gender-politics model – general deterrence – genocide – geographic profiling – grand jury – grave robbing – grievous bodily harm – guilt – guilty but mentally ill – gun control

== H ==
habitual offender statute – hacker – harm reduction – hate crime – hedonistic calculus – heroin – home invasion – homelessness – homicide – honour culture – honour killing – house arrest – human cannibalism – human rights – hybrid offence

== I ==
identity theft – illegal gambling – illegitimate opportunity structure – imprisonment – incapacitation – inchoate offense – indictable offence – individual rights advocate – infraction – in limine – insanity defense – institutionalization – integrated theory of criminology – interactionist perspectives – interdiction – internal validity – international crime (disambiguation) – invisible evidence – irresistible impulse test – isobutyl nitrite

== J ==
just deserts – justice

== K ==
kidnapping – kleptomania – kriminalpolitik

== L ==
labeling (criminology) – laceration – larceny – larceny-theft – Law Enforcement Assistance Administration (LEAA) – law enforcement in the United Kingdom – law enforcement in the United States – left realism – legal immunity – libel – life course theories – liquor laws – Locard's exchange principle – Cesare Lombroso – looting – luminol

== M ==
Jesus Malverde – manslaughter – manslaughter in English law – mass murder – mass surveillance – M'Naghten Rules – MDMA – Meadow's law – media influence theory – medroxyprogesterone acetate treatment – mens rea – methylenedioxymethamphetamine – misdemeanor – modus operandi – Monozygotic twins – moral enterprise – moral entrepreneur – motive – moral panic – Munchausen's syndrome by proxy – murder – murder in English law

== N ==
narcotic – narcotic abuse theory – narcotrafico – national crime victimization survey – needle exchange – negligent homicide – neoclassical criminology – NIBRS – nurturant strategy

== O ==
occupational crime – offender profiling – OJJDP – operant behavior – Operation Spanner – opportunity structure – organised crime – organized crime – ostracism

== P ==
panopticon – paraffin test – participatory justice – peacemaking criminology – penal couple – penile plethysmography – penitentiary – penology – perfect crime – perjury – pharmaceutical diversion – phenobarbital – phenomenological criminology – pimping – piracy – plea bargain – plea of temporary insanity – police – police corruption – police misconduct – police riot – police state – police surgeon – polygraph – Portland Seven – positivism – positivist school of criminology – post-crime victimization – post-mortem examination – postmortem lividity – postal fraud – postmodern criminology – powercontrol theory – Alma Preinkert – primary deviance – primary research – prison – prison cell – prisons in the United States – Prohibition – prosecutor's fallacy – prostitution – protection/avoidance strategy – psychiatric criminology – psychiatric theories of criminology – psychoactive substance – psychoanalytic criminology – psychological profiling – psychological theories – psychopath – Public criminology – Public humiliation - public order crime – punishment – pure research – pyromania

== Q ==
qualitative method – questioned document examination

== R ==
racial profiling – racially motivated crime – racketeering – radical criminology – rape – realist criminology – recidivism – recidivism rate – reciprocal obligation – reintegrative shaming – remand – remorse – replicability – research design – restitution – restraining order – revolving door syndrome – reward – rigor mortis – riot – robbery – rohypnol – routine activities theory

== S ==
second degree murder – secondary deviance – secondary research – secondary victimization – securities fraud – sentence – serial killer – sex offender – sexual assault – sexual crime – sexual harassment – shaken baby syndrome – shame – shoplifting – simple assault – slander – smuggling – social control – social control theory – social disorganization – social epidemiology – social justice – social ostracism – social policy – sodomy law – somatotyping – specific deterrence – speed (drug) – spousal abuse – spree killing – stalking – starlight tour – statutory law – strain theory – street fighting – street gang – Theodore Streleski – strict liability crimes – subcultural theory – suicide pact – summary conviction – summary offence – supermale – superpredators (disambiguation) – Edwin H. Sutherland

== T ==
target hardening – tax evasion – techniques of neutralization – terminal ballistics – terrorism – tests of significance – theft – threat analysis – three strikes law – thug life (concept) – torture – total institution – toxicology – trace evidence – transient evidence – transylvanian hypothesis – treason – trespass

== U ==
uni-causal – uniform crime report – universal jurisdiction – usury – utilitarianism – uxoricide

== V ==
vandalism – verbal abuse – verstehen – victim impact statement – victim-precipitated homicide – victim-proneness – victim-witness assistance program – victimization rate – victimless crime – victimogenesis – victimology – violence – violent crime – VOCA – voluntary euthanasia – Juan Vucetich

== W ==
war crime – war on drugs – weapon possession – white-collar crime – witness intimidation

== Y ==
yakuza – young offender

== Z ==
zero tolerance
