= National Deviancy Symposium =

British criminology organisation

The National Deviancy Symposium (or National Deviancy Conference) consisted of a group of British criminologists dissatisfied with orthodox British criminology who met at the University of York in the late 1960s and early 1970s. The group included Paul Rock, David Downes, Laurie Taylor, Stan Cohen, Ian Taylor and Jock Young. Many members later became involved in critical criminology and/or Left realism.

== Foundation ==
The NDC was formed in July 1968, as a radical breakaway from the Third National Conference of Teaching and Research on Criminology at the University of Cambridge by seven individuals. These seven were Kit Carson, Stan Cohen, David Downes, Mary Susan McIntosh, Paul Rock, Ian Taylor and Jock Young.

Sir Leon Radzinowicz, one of the most important figures in post-war criminology in Britain, recounts the formation of the National Deviancy Symposium:

"I do not wish to end this account without mentioning a rather amusing episode. Right in the middle of the Third National (Criminology) Conference, taking place in Cambridge in July 1968, a group of seven young social scientists and criminologists, participants of the Conference, met secretly and decided to establish an independent 'National Deviancy Conference' and soon afterwards they duly met in York. At the time, it reminded me a little of naughty schoolboys, playing a nasty game on their stern headmaster. It was not necessary to go 'underground' because we were not in any way opposed to discussing new approaches to the sociology of deviance ... Although not invited to their conference in York I asked one of my senior colleagues in the Institute to go there as an observer.
"My attitude was by no means hostile or patronizing. As I stated at the time, movements in ideas, like life in general, often lead to seeming unexpected baffling results. Those were the years of dissent, protest and ferment in the United States with their unmistakable echoes in Britain. They affected not only the ways people acted, but also their thinking on many matters relating to social life and its reinterpretations. But it was also a reaction to some extent inevitable and to some extent misguided of the new generation of British criminologists against what appeared to be the stolid establishment of Criminology as personified by the Cambridge Institute and probably also by its first Director."

As Radzinowcz's account shows National Deviancy Conference was initially "deeply critical of the medico-psychological assumptions, social democratic politics, and atheoretical programme of what they termed 'positivist criminology'."

== Early days ==
The group proceeded to organise 13 conferences between 1968 and 1973, publishing three sets of conference papers in the process.

The group also tried to provide a financial support and a forum for campaign groups around criminal justice, such as "the gay, women's, mental patients' and prisoners' movements" such as Preservation of the Rights of Prisoners (PROP), Radical Alternatives to Prison (RAP) and People not Psychiatry.

Of the group's biggest successes was helping to set up in 1974 the European Group for the Study of Deviance and Control.

== Divergence ==
However, by the mid-1970s conferences began to be held less regularly, and academics worked on their own individual branch of critical criminology. Ian Taylor, Jock Young and Paul Walton wrote the groundbreaking The New Criminology in 1973, following that with the edited collection, Critical Criminology, in 1975 writing on the need for a marxist, "fully social" theory of deviance. Whereas those around Stuart Hall, at the Birmingham Centre for Contemporary Cultural Studies focussed on "sub-cultures of imagination and resistance". David Downes and Paul Rock put forward an interactionist approach in response to the neo-marxists in their 1979 compilation, Deviant Interpretations.

Their penultimate conference was entitled, Permissiveness and Control, and was held in 1977, where the NDC announced its end. In January 1979 they held their last conference, a joint conference with the Conference of Socialist Economists Law and the State Group under the title 'Capitalist Discipline and the Rule of Law', the book Capitalism and the Rule of Law a product of this work. In his contribution in this book, Jock Young first coined the term left idealism and is said to have been converted to left realism.

== The new National Deviancy Conference ==
The conference was revived in 2011 and held at the University of York. Many of the original contributors attended, including Jock Young, Stanley Cohen and Tony Jefferson. New blood mixed with the old, and speeches from scholars such as Robert Reiner, Steve Hall, Keith Hayward, Simon Hallsworth, Paul Hamilton, Phil Hodgeson John Lea, Mike Sutton, Simon Winlow, Andrew Wilson, Kevin Stenson and Mark Horsley called for new theories to analyse crime and control in today's world. The conference was organized by Simon Winlow and Rowland Atkinson.

The National Deviancy Conference was held again at Teesside University in 2014. The theme was 'critical criminology and post-crash capitalism'. It was organized by the Teesside Centre for Realist Criminology. The plenary speakers were Rowland Atkinson, Emaonn Carrabine, Walter DeKeseredy, Steve Hall, Keith J. Hayward, John Lea, Maggie O'Neill, Vincenzo Ruggerio and Sandra Walklate.

== Publications of National Deviancy Conferences ==
- Cohen, S. ed. (1971) Images of Deviance, Harmondsworth: Penguin
- Taylor, I. & Taylor, L., eds. (1972) Politics and Deviance: Papers from the National Deviancy Conference, Harmondsworth: Penguin
- Bailey, R. & Young, J. eds (1973) Contemporary Social Problems in Britain, Farnborough: Saxon House
- Fine, B. eds. (1979) Capitalism and the Rule of Law: From Deviancy Theory to Marxism London: Hutchinson
- National Deviancy Conference (eds) (1980) Permissiveness and Control, London: Macmillan

== Publications from the new National Deviancy Conference ==
- Winlow, S. and Atkinson, R. eds. (2012) Crime, Media, Culture: Special Edition, Papers from the York Deviancy Conference 2011, 8(2), August
- Winlow, S. and Atkinson, R. eds. (2012) New Directions in Crime and Deviancy, London: Routledge
