= Radical criminology =

School of criminology

Radical criminology states that society "functions" in terms of the general interests of the ruling class rather than "society as a whole" and that while the potential for conflict is always present, it is continually neutralised by the power of a ruling class. Radical criminology is related to critical and conflict criminology in its focus on class struggle and its basis in Marxism. Radical criminologists consider crime to be a tool used by the ruling class. Laws are put into place by the elite and are then used to serve their interests at the peril of the lower classes. These laws regulate opposition to the elite and keep them in power.

Given its nature, radical criminology is not well funded by governments and is generally not supported by government policies. Some argue that the radical criminological perspective has waned in influence, particularly with an aging population. Concerns about its credibility and utility persist, and there is ongoing debate about whether radical criminology still exists.

== Origins ==
Radical criminology is based on a variant of Marxism called Instrumental Marxism. It rose in popularity in the US in the 1960s amid the Civil Rights and Anti-War movements. The protests of students and minorities caused sociologists and criminologists to look to situational explanations of social and political unrest in America. Radical criminology's popularisation coincided with the rise of conflict and critical perspectives. All three share a common basis in Marxist ideals. In 1990 the Division of Critical Criminology was recognised by the American Society of Criminology, which solidified radical criminology as a legit theory. The band Rage Against the Machine as an example of the radical perspective.

== Approaches ==
Radical criminology posits that the current criminal justice system seeks only to serve the interests of the ruling class and thus perpetuates inequality in society. The justice system creates white collar, high class jobs while alienating oppressed minorities from the job market. The justice system’s fixation on repeat offenders and punishment reflects an adherence to individual blame theories that alleviate the blame on those in power. This is seen through the focus on street crime rather than white collar crime.

=== Definitions of crime ===
Radical criminologists reject the legalistic definition of crime for one centered in the violations of human rights. This includes the crimes committed by the ruling class such as pollution and exploitation that are not typically considered crimes. Radical criminologists also reject all individualistic theories of crime such as biological and psychological in favor of analyzing the social conditions that cause individuals to be labeled as criminals. Radical criminologists see mainstream theories of crime and deviance as serving to uphold the status quo of capitalism. The only way to solve the crime problem is to overthrow the capitalism system from which the conflict originates.

Radical criminologists are abolitionist in that they seek to end all state criminal justice systems that cause the suffering of the oppressed.

=== Views on property crimes ===
Radical criminologists believe that traditional criminology puts too much emphasis on the violence of property crime. Property crime is a symptom of a system that exploits the lower classes and puts the well-being of the property of the upper class above the needs of the lower class. Therefore it is not truly a crime, but only a reaction to an unjust society. Under capitalism, all crimes committed by the lower class are necessary for their survival.

=== Views on illegal immigration ===
Radical criminologists reject the ideas of national sovereignty and border security. These exist because of the state's oppression and should be challenged. Therefore, no immigration should be illegal.

=== Role of criminologists ===
Radical criminologists believe that criminology should be public, that is, should exist and have an impact outside of academia. The role then, of radical criminologists is to educate the public of the dangers of capitalism, while actively campaigning for its demise.

== Main concepts ==
=== Strain theory ===
In terms of the social hierarchy criteria, strain theory is generally accepted to have clear class developments and is generally consistent with radical theory. Radical theory is solely based upon the view that criminal law is a tool in which the wealthy compel the poor into repeated mannerisms and behaviour that preserve the stereotype in which they are seen as felons and delinquents. The general component of strain theory states that the allocation of rewards does not promote obedience, and that rewards are challenging and uncommon for those with little formal education and few economic resources.

In its entirety, particular strains or pressures, according to strain theories, enhance the chance of crime. Negative emotions such as dissatisfaction and rage are triggered by these tensions. These feelings put pressure on people to take action, and one option is to commit a crime. Crime can be employed to alleviate bad feelings, seek retribution against the cause of the strain or connected targets, or relieve or escape from stress. It is theorised that crime is more likely to arise in socioeconomic structures where rewards and resources are limited, and those who do not obtain their fair share of society’s goods and services are more likely to partake in criminal activity.

When criminologists argue that social organisation has unidirectional consequences that are unrelated to history, their claims have materialist connotations that are in line with Marxist methodology. This structuralist strategy can be applied to the strain theory position on crime causation, as shown by Robert Merton’s research(an American sociologist), in which he describes how crime is produced in two stages. The first stage implies that ethics play a role in crime frequency, which contradicts the systemic reasoning for radical criminality. The second aspect of the argument is that anti-social behaviour and the rejection of such traditional ideas are indicators of crime causation as well.

According to this theory, social control can be sustained in three ways; conformity is encouraged as individuals have common views and values; conformity can be purchased by providing people with socially beneficial benefits and rewards; and conformity can be maintained using intimidation. Intimidation is very counterproductive and should only be used after the other options have failed.

This theory also argues that criminality is more likely to arise in socioeconomic structures where benefits and resources are limited.

=== Cultural deviance ===
Cultural theory fits the least well with radical expectations, and unlike strain theory’s elements, cultural theories make no effort to view cultural principles as a solution to structural constraints. The cultural stance that an individual commits a crime because they have internalised pro-criminal values is widely accepted. This concept reflects the societal idea that a major component of lower-class rebellious behaviour is a practical attempt to attain states, environments, or values that a prices within the actors’ most important milieu. Wolfgang and Ferracuti also contend that the open use of force or aggression is seen as a representation of fundamental principles that are distinct from the mainstream/core society.

The basic values that cultural scholars point to for the purpose of criminal causation have been defined in a variety of ways: cultural emphasis on resilience, trouble, and enthusiasm to subcultural desires for short term gratification and risk taking. There are also claims that lower-class people have impulsive, decadent, vicious, and negativistic value inclinations.

The general inference that cultural theorists make is that people commit crimes because their society demands it; people commit crimes because they have accepted that it is the right thing to do in accordance to their role in society.

=== Social control ===
Control propositions and theories of societal disorganisation have been suggested as contributing to criminology’s theoretical problem. Lower-class crime is explained by macrosociological versions of domination and institutional disorganisation ideologies, which, with the inclusion of socially theoretical changes, will be entirely consistent with radical expectations.

Under this theory, it is believed that whilst social controls are sufficient, strong social relations can develop. Social controls are characterised as real or possible incentives and penalties that result from adherence to the norms. This means that obedience is bought, and the personality must be rewarded for it. But, since rewards are not necessarily plentiful, people may be coerced into conforming by intimidating them with payback. According to the theory, punishments have an inverse association in terms of success, since when rewards decline, further punitive steps are needed to maintain compliance.

The theory also outlines the idea that conformity starts with the fair presumption that people are more likely to conform if they have anything to achieve. When conformity is no longer seen as rewarding, there are less “stakes of conformity," a higher risk of individuals breaking out on their own, and a higher likelihood of those individuals engaging in illegal behaviour.

Basically, the social control theory is a mix of both strain theory and the cultural deviance theory.

== Conflict criminology vs radical criminology ==
The difference between conflict criminology and radical criminology derives from the fact that throughout the 1970s, numerous American radical criminologists deemed themselves conflict criminologists. The misunderstanding arises because the two ideas share philosophical roots in Karl Marx’s works, in which radical criminology has long been presented as a component of conflict theory.

There is currently a very obvious distinction between the two in regards to American criminology. The reliance of conventional criminology on scientific theories of the origins of criminal behaviour and the calculation of crime recorded in the Uniform Crime Reports is challenged by radical criminologists. The state’s interest in coercion is assisted by focusing on traditional criminals and individual responsibility, which leads to sentences designed to prevent people from choosing violence. Individual quilt often serves to deflect focus away from systemic models of causation, allowing people in positions of authority to avoid taking accountability. According to radicals, criminologists, the general population, and politicians, rely on violence in the streets, causing people in power to execute even more violent activity with no risk of retaliation.

But, according to conflict criminology, crime in patriarchal societies cannot be fully respected without acknowledging that such societies are dominated by a wealthy minority whose continued authority demands the financial misuse of others, and that such societies’ ideas, structures, and activities are structured and maintained to keep such communities marginalised, impoverished, and exploited.

== Different perspectives ==
=== United Kingdom ===
When the National Deviancy Conference (NDC) was created in July 1968 as a secession from the Third National Conference of Teaching and Research on Criminology at the University of Cambridge, it marked the beginning of radical criminology in the United Kingdom.

Radical criminology and its administrative equivalent arose from positivism in the United Kingdom. As radical thinking pushed forth new claims to the field, the underpinnings of traditional administrative criminology were widely disputed.

The distinctions between external and internal history are reflected in the developments in British criminology throughout the late 1960s and early 1970s. The material, political, and social reality in which the discipline lives, in a sense, is the main driver of developments in criminology. The most pressing material issue was an increase in crime, which was accompanied by an increase in the jail population, reoffences, and lower police clearance rates. The development of the New Left in the late 1960s and early 1970s provided the political framework for the rise of radical criminology in both the United Kingdom and the United States.

=== United States ===
Following the decade of the 1960s, radical American criminology, like Britain's, became a dominant force. A sequence of shocks shocked the world's most rich and powerful country from its relative laziness. It was tested by the Vietnam War, in which a country of peasants was on the verge of defeating the South Vietnamese and the US militarily. Young Americans became more radicalised as a result of the conflict. This is because young men were subject to the draft, which forced them to make a moral decision.

The criminal justice system, in Reiman's opinion, "acts like a distorting carnival mirror," giving people a skewed perception of crime rather than a completely false one. Much of the harm done by the “well-to-do” is not classified as a crime, and even when it is, it is not actively punished. The main concept in American criminology is that economic pressures in society are particularly harsh on the poor because of their extreme need and relative inaccessibility to opportunities for legitimate economic prosperity, which greatly intensifies the burdens towards crime that arise at all tiers of our social structure. As a result, poor individuals commit a larger percentage of the crimes that people dread than their population as a whole, validating the strain theory.

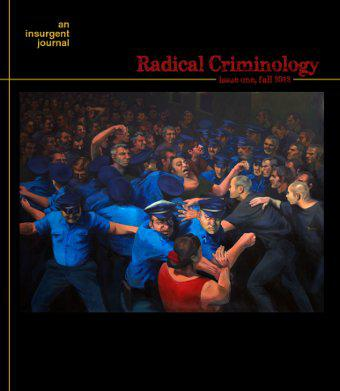
Cover issue no. 1 of "Radical Criminology: A Manifesto Journal"

== Development ==
Recently a group of anarchists and abolitionists associated with the Critical Criminology Working Group in the Criminology Department at Kwantlen Polytechnic University have advocated an activist, explicitly anti-capitalist and anti-statist radical criminology. In 2012 they launched the journal "Radical Criminology." An outline of a contemporary radical criminology and a call to action was issued in the journal's "Radical Criminology: A Manifesto."

== Criticism ==
Critiques of radical criminology come from both traditional criminologists who reject the failings of capitalism, and from other conflict criminologists who follow different interpretations of Marxist thought. Given its anti-capitalist stance, radical criminology is rejected by proponents of capitalism and those who reject the Marxist theories upon which radical criminology is based. Still others who may agree with some of the core beliefs of radical criminology find it is too impractical and idealistic.

Radical criminology fails to take into account the many varied causes and reasons for crime. Therefore, it also can't explain the relatively low crime rates in some capitalist countries when compared to others. If class conflict was the only cause of crime than all capitalist countries should have relatively the same crime rates. Additionally, countries that have successfully overthrown their capitalist structures should have eliminated crime, yet crime in socialist countries does not often differ from that of capitalist countries. With such an advanced economy, social class is not always tied so clearly to owning the means of production, and definitions of who belongs to which classes are too often ambiguous.

Some find issues with radical criminology's definition, or lack thereof, of crime. Since they reject the consensus perspective of crime, definitions of crime then vary from person to person, and are based on value judgments rather than a set of standards.

== See also ==
- Critical criminology
- Conflict criminology
- Left realism
- Conflict theory
- Postmodernity
