= Jock Young =

British sociologist and criminologist

Jock Young FRSA
- Born: 4 March 1942; Midlothian, Scotland
- Died: 16 November 2013 (aged 71)

Academic background
- Education: London School of Economics
- Influences: C. Wright Mills

Academic work
- Discipline: Sociology
- Sub-discipline: Criminology
- School or tradition: Left realism
- Institutions: University of Middlesex; CUNY Graduate Center

Jock Young FRSA (4 March 1942 – 16 November 2013) was a British sociologist and criminologist.

== Biography ==
Jock Young was educated at the London School of Economics. His PhD was an ethnography of drug use in Notting Hill, West London, out of which he developed the concept of moral panic. The research was published as The Drugtakers. He was a founding member of the National Deviancy Conferences and a group of critical criminologists in which milieu he wrote the groundbreaking, The New Criminology: For a Social Theory of Deviance in 1973, with Ian Taylor and Paul Walton and The Manufacture of News (with Stan Cohen).

He was Distinguished Professor of Criminal Justice and Sociology at the Graduate Center of the City University of New York, Visiting Professor at the University of Kent, UK, and a Fellow of the Royal Society of Arts. Before moving to New York he was Professor of Sociology at the University of Middlesex where he was head of the Centre for Criminology.

At Middlesex he devised the first postgraduate course in crime and deviancy in the UK. With his colleagues, most notably John Lea and Roger Matthews, he developed left realist criminology in a series of books including What Is to Be Done About Law and Order? (1984). He completed research on criminal victimisation, stop and search, and urban riots, and was a frequent contributor to media debates on crime and policing. He was lead investigator in the Gifford Inquiry of 1985 following the Broadwater Farm riot. The Centre for Criminology was particularly known for left realist criminology and its series of local crime victimisation surveys, for example, the Islington Crime Surveys which were conducted in 1986 and 1990. In 1998 he was awarded the Sellin-Glueck Award for Distinguished International Scholar by the American Society of Criminology followed in 2003 by the Lifetime Achievement Award of the Critical Criminology Division.

Subsequently, his theoretical interests were oriented towards cultural criminology, publishing with Jeff Ferrell and Keith Hayward Cultural Criminology: An Invitation (2008), which was awarded the Distinguished Book Award of the International Division of the American Society of Criminology. He completed a trilogy of books about social life and sociological research in late modernity: The Exclusive Society (1999), The Vertigo of Late Modernity (2007) and The Criminological Imagination (2011).

In 2022, the Division of Critical Criminology and Social Justice renamed its annual distinguished book award "The Jock Young, Criminological Imagination" award in his honor.

In the 21st century Young published sixteen articles in refereed journals on topics ranging from the US/UK crime drop to moral panic theory, Bernard Madoff, crime and the 2008 financial crisis, terrorism and immigration. Twenty-seven of his articles were published as book chapters, whilst essays from his early work in the 1970s to today have been reproduced in readers and in translation. His work has been translated into eleven languages. In 2011 Young gave the introductory plenary at both the British Criminology Conference and the York Deviancy Conference. In 2012 he was awarded the Outstanding Achievement Award of the British Society of Criminology. In the months before his death he was working on a book entitled Merton's Dreams and Mills' Imagination. In 2013 he completed a new introduction to the anniversary edition of The New Criminology.

== Personal life ==
Jock Young was born in Midlothian, Scotland, the son of a lorry driver. He died of anaplastic thyroid cancer on 16 November 2013.

== Major works ==
- Young, J. (1971) The Drugtakers: The Social Meaning of Drug Use, London: Judson, McGibbon and Kee
- Taylor, I., Walton, P. & Young, J. (1973) The New Criminology: For a Social Theory of Deviance (International Library of Sociology), London: Routledge. ISBN 0-415-03447-7
- Lea, J., and Young, J. (1984) What Is to Be Done About Law and Order?, London: Penguin.
- Young, J. (1999) The Exclusive Society: Social Exclusion, Crime and Difference in Late Modernity. London; Thousand Oaks: Sage Publications. ISBN 0-8039-8151-1
- Young, J. (2007) The Vertigo of Late Modernity, London: Sage Publications. ISBN 1-4129-3574-1
- Ferrell, J., Hayward, K., Young, J. (2008) Cultural Criminology: An Invitation, London: Sage.
- Young, J. (2011) The Criminological Imagination, Cambridge: Polity.
