= Ian Taylor (sociologist) =

British sociologist

Ian Taylor (11 March 1944 – 19 January 2001) was a British sociologist. He was born in Sheffield.

Taylor completed his undergraduate degree at Durham University, where he was an active socialist and involved in the Anti-Apartheid Movement. He continued his studies at Cambridge before returning to Durham for his doctorate.

== National Deviancy Symposium and Critical Criminology ==
Taylor was one of the founding members of the National Deviancy Symposium and was one of the co-authors of The New Criminology: For a Social Theory of Deviance in 1973 along with Jock Young and Paul Walton, as well as later editing Critical Criminology with both of them.

In 1981, whilst lecturing at Sheffield University he wrote Law and Order: Arguments for Socialism, which Jock Young states:

"[it] forcefully argued the need for parties of the left to take seriously the problems of crime"

Moving to Canada shortly after, he lectured at Carleton University before returning to become chair of Sociology at the University of Salford. On leaving Salford, he became the Principal of Van Mildert College, Durham until he retired due to illness.

== Left realism and beyond ==
In 1999 he published his final book, Crime in Context after becoming Principal of Van Mildert College at Durham University, a role he stepped down from a year prior to his death due to his ill health.

In Crime in Context, he sets out his relationship to the left realism project, saying that his involvement was 'more tangential' than with Critical Criminology, and that

The continuing legacy of that realist influence in this text are evident in two important respects. I have been concerned, first, 'to take crime seriously'... Secondly, I share with left realism a commitment to a 'realist' (as distinct from idealist) strategy with respect to the actual analysis of 'crime' (as both behaviour and mass-media representation)

== Publications and articles ==
=== 1960s ===
- Taylor, I. (1968) Football Mad: A Speculative Sociology of Football Hooliganism, NDC 1st Symposium (November)

Taylor, Ian and Laurie Taylor. 'We are All Deviants Now', International Socialism 34 (1968) 1st series

=== 1970s ===
- Taylor, I. & Walton, P. (1970) "Values in deviancy theory and society", The British Journal of Sociology, XXI (4): 362 - 74
- Taylor, I. (1971) "Theories of action in juvenile correction facilities", Unpulished paper given to the First Anglo-Scandinavian Seminar in Criminology, Norway, September 1971
- Taylor, I. (1971) "The new criminology in an age of doubt", New Edinburgh Review, 15 (November): 14–17
- Taylor, L. & Taylor, I. (eds) (1972) Politics and Deviance, Harmondsworth: Penguin
- Taylor, I., Walton, P. & Young, J. (1973) The New Criminology: For a Social Theory of Deviance (International Library of Sociology), Routledge. ISBN 0-415-03447-7
- Taylor I., Walton P. Young J. (eds) (1975) Critical Criminology, London: Routledge and Kegan Paul
- Bianchi, H., Simondi, M. & Taylor, I. (1975) Deviance and Control in Europe, London: John Wiley

=== 1980s ===
- Taylor, I. (1982) Law and Order: Arguments for Socialism, London: Macmillan
- Taylor, I. (1987) "Law and Order, Moral Order: The Changing Rhetorics of the Thatcher Government" In: Miliband, R., Pantich, L. & Saville, J. (eds) The Socialist Register, London: The Merlin Press

=== 1990s ===
- Taylor, I. (1992) "The International Drug Trade and Money Laundering: Border Control and Other Issues", European Sociological Review, 8 (1): 181–193
- Taylor, I. (1993) "Driving the Vermin off the Streets", New Statesman and Society, (8 October): 16–18
- Taylor, I. (1994) "The Political Economy of Crime" In: Maguire, M., Morgan, R. & Reiner, R. (eds.) The Oxford Handbook of Criminology, Oxford: Oxford University Press
- Taylor, I. (1997) "Free Markets and the Costs of Crime: An Audit of England and Wales" In: Walton, P. & Young, J. (eds) The New Criminology Revisited, Basingstoke: Macmillan
- Taylor, I. (1997) "Crime and Social Insecurity in Europe", Criminal Justice Matters, 27 (Spring): 3–5
- Ruggerio, V., South, N. & Taylor, I. (eds) (1998)The New European Criminology: Crime and social order in Europe, London: Routledge

-Taylor, I. (1998) "Crime, market-liberalism and the European idea"

- Taylor, I. (1999) "Respectable, Rural and English: the Lobby Against the Regulation of Firearms in Great Britain" In: Carlen, P. & Morgan, R. (eds) Crime Unlimited: Questions for the 21st Century, Basingstoke: Macmillan
- Taylor, I. (1999). Crime in Context: A Critical Criminology of Market Societies, Oxford: Polity Press

Academic offices
Preceded by Judy Turner	Principal of Van Mildert College, Durham; 1999–2000	Succeeded by George Patterson
