= Positive criminology =

Branch of criminology

Positive criminology is based on the perspective that integration and positive life influences that help individuals develop personally and socially will lead to a reduced risk of criminal behavior and better recovery of offenders. Integration works in three levels: inter-personal, intra-personal and spiritual. Positive influences include participation in recovery programs, such as those for substance use disorders. Factors that can make growth difficult include a long-standing pattern of criminal activity, serious adverse life events, and chronic mental health illness.

== History ==
The term "positive criminology" was first introduced by Natti Ronel and his research team at Bar-Ilan University, Israel. Accordingly, it represents a wide perspective that includes several existing models and theories. It is partially based on Peacemaking criminology and on Positive Psychology, and relates to known and accepted models such as restorative justice.

Enrico Ferri, a socialist, introduced his theory of positive criminality, which was based upon the elimination of antisocial conduct according to "a science of society, taking on for itself the task of the eradication of crime", during three lectures in Naples, Italy in 1901. Rather than punishment, Ferri believed that crimes should be addressed by social sanctions, in proportion to the degree of danger of the criminal act and risk to society. He and other determinists, like Baruch Spinoza, eschewed the concept of moral guilt and responsibility. While libertarianists, like Immanuel Kant of the 18th-century, believed in the concept of morality that may be subject to change. In the 19th century, there were also social scientists that believed that effectively combating criminality included improving society's health and welfare and eliminating poverty.

== Treatment and rehabilitation ==
=== Strength-based treatment programs ===
In recent years, various programs have been developed in the field of rehabilitation of offenders, in community and prison, based on the principles of cognitive-behavioral approach, usually implemented in a group setting. These programs are considered a form of strength-based treatment, due to the emphasis on personal, interpersonal and social skills developed that enable participants to acquire pro-social lifestyle, which may also reduce their need for deviant behaviors. The assumption underlying these programs is that those who work on acquisition of new positive skills, rather than just avoidance from negative behaviors, will achieve better results and be able to maintain the positive outcomes for the long run. Recent studies indicated their effectiveness in reducing recidivism amongst released offenders.

==== The Good Lives Model ====
The Good Lives Model (GLM), first proposed by Ward and Stewart and further developed by Ward and colleagues, is a strengths-based approach to offender rehabilitation that is responsive to offenders' particular interests, abilities, and aspirations. It also directs practitioners to explicitly construct intervention plans that help offenders to acquire the capabilities to achieve the things that are personally meaningful to them. It assumes that all individuals have similar aspirations and needs and that one of the primary responsibilities of parents, teachers, and the broader community is to help each of us acquire the tools required to make our own way in the world.

Criminal behavior results when individuals lack the internal and external resources necessary to satisfy their values using pro-social means, or where a single aspiration or need is valued exclusively over all other aspirations or needs. In other words, criminal behavior represents a maladaptive attempt to meet life values, or a singular focus on one specific life value.

Offenders, like all humans, value certain states of mind, personal characteristics, and experiences, which are defined in the GLM as primary goods. Following an extensive review of psychological, social, biological, and anthropological research, Ward and colleagues proposed eleven classes of primary goods: (1) life (including healthy living and functioning), (2) knowledge, (3) excellence in play, (4) excellence in work (including mastery experiences), (5) excellence in agency (i.e., autonomy and self-directedness), (6) inner peace (i.e., freedom from emotional turmoil and stress), (7) friendship (including intimate, romantic, and family relationships), (8) community, (9) spirituality (in the broad sense of finding meaning and purpose in life), (10) happiness, and (11) creativity. Whilst it is assumed that all humans seek out all the primary goods to some degree, the weightings or priorities given to specific primary goods reflect an offender's values and life priorities. Moreover, the existence of a number of practical identities, based on, for example, family roles (e.g., parent), work (e.g., psychologist), and leisure (e.g., rugby player) mean that an individual might draw on different value sources in different contexts, depending on the normative values underpinning each practical identity. Instrumental goods, or secondary goods, provide concrete means of securing primary goods and take the form of approach goals.

=== Existential therapy ===
Existential therapy is based on the premise that there are several factors that influence one's life, like culture and biology, and that the central problems people experience are due to isolation, anxiety, despair, and loneliness. The goal of therapy is to develop skills to make good life choices and use positive forces—like love, authenticity, and creativity— to create a meaningful life. Viktor Frankl, psychiatrist and author of Man's Search for Meaning, said that according to research there was a correlation between lack of meaning in one's life and depression, addictions, and criminal behavior. People who do not have a sense of meaning in their life are prone to neurotic compulsions and obsessions, boredom, materialism, hatred, power, and hedonistic pleasures. Rather than focusing on the past or future, existential therapy focuses on the present and the relationship with one's self, by being aware of one's feelings, using relaxation and other forms of therapies, and learning how to deal directly with issues.

=== Yoga and meditation programs ===
Yoga and meditation programs have been used in correctional facilities to promote reflection, mindfulness and patience, and reduce stress in an environment that is a breeding ground for violence and negative thinking. A yoga program was established in the United States at San Quentin State Prison in 2002 by James Fox. Formalized later as the Prison Yoga Project, it teaches asana, pranayama, and meditation practices—and how to train the mind not to be reactive—which helps individuals cope from past trauma and develop more productive behavior patterns. More than 100 jails and prisons in the United States have replicated the Prison Yoga Project programs. (Note: For example, The Prison Yoga Project – New York and Liberation Yoga Project, in conjunction with the Department of Health and Human Hygiene (DHMH), have provided yoga programs for men, women, and youth in several state correctional facilities, including Rikers Island and the Bedford Hills Correctional Facility for Women.) Steven Belenko, a professor with Temple University's Department of Criminal Justice states that yoga and meditation instruction could be provided via DVDs, which would be a relatively low-cost solution for prisons.

=== Self-help groups and the 12-step program ===
One of the most popular approaches in the Western world for self-change in the field of addiction is that of the twelve-step program. Self-help groups in general, and in particular the twelve-step programs, which emphasize spiritual and moral change, represent another aspect of positive criminology. The groups serve as a place for learning and practicing new behavior and values, alongside spiritual development. Research conducted among addicts who participated in the twelve-step program and the Alcoholics Anonymous (AA) and Narcotics Anonymous (NA) self- and mutual-help groups has identified several therapeutic elements that helped addicts in the recovery process, including change in their perception of life and finding new and noble meaning to life, spiritual awakening through faith in a higher power that helps them to abstain from psychoactive substances, transformation of anger and resentment into forgiveness, and sponsoring another person in the recovery process. According to Ronel (1998), self-help organizations such as NA constitute a bridge to recovery, connecting the drug subculture to the general dominant culture.

The twelve-step program originated in AA and was then adopted by other self-help organizations that target a variety of problems, such as drug addiction (NA), eating disorders (Overeaters Anonymous [OA]), emotional disturbance (Emotions Anonymous [EA]), and others. Since its inception, the twelve-step program has caught the attention of professionals as a possible expert approach of therapy, first limited to addiction and later extended into other fields, such as domestic violence or victims' assistance, as well. It could, therefore, be perceived as being a general, professional treatment method and program for recovery, also known as Grace Therapy. In a professional setting, the 12 steps may be adapted to the changing needs of the participants.

== Positive victimology ==
The concept of "positive victimology" evolved from positive criminology and it was first proposed by Natti Ronel and his research team. Positive victimology's focus is on those who were hurt by crime and/or abuse of power.

== Studies ==
=== Social acceptance and life transformation ===
Social acceptance and life transformation in the rehabilitation of imprisoned sex offenders was the first that was designed and conducted according to the principles of positive criminology. The purpose of this qualitative study was to identify the internal and external factors that assist imprisoned sex offenders to recover and change their way of life. Most participants reported that they had experienced personal and social changes during their current imprisonment, attributed to the support they received from various sources both inside and outside the jail, particularly spouses, parents, therapists, and religious figures. Participants reported that those who supported them expressed their social acceptance of them; note that this does not refer to unconditional acceptance, but one that requires taking responsibility and making a significant change by the side of the offender. It might be referred as conditioned love, where the conditions are for the benefits of the loved ones. It contains components similar to those included in the re-integrative shaming mechanism. Research findings also suggest that positive changes can be achieved even under harsh conditions such as imprisonment, through the encounter with human strengths. In a way that continues these findings, Siebrecht Vanhooren, Mia Leijssen, and Jessie Dezutter from the Department of Psychology, University of Leuven, Belgium, conducted a pilot study with a mixed-method design on posttraumatic growth and psychological stress in a sample of sexual offenders (n = 30) in ongoing therapy.

=== Impact of interactions with volunteers ===
Several studies examined the impact of a personal encounter with perceived goodness, as represented by volunteers who are perceived as altruistic by those they help. The studies focused on the encounter between lay volunteers and either: (1) at-risk street youths in a mobile outreach service (a qualitative study), (2) at-risk youth in drop-in centers for youth at-risk in Israel (a qualitative and quantitative study) and (3) two experiments carried out by Niek Hoogervorst, Judith Metz, Lonneke Roza, and Eva van Baren from the Netherlands that support this indirect effect of volunteerism on affect-based trust.

=== Altruism ===
Many philosophers such as Plato, Aristotle, Nietzsche and Spinoza, already discussed the importance of using positive human components for creating a better human society. They also argued that the ability for human kindness is not predetermined but can be changed by external interventions, such as through exposing the individual to positive encounters that may lead to appropriate changes in the person and the surroundings.

=== Improving offender's well-being ===
Positive criminology stresses the healing effect of positively perceived experiences. During the last years there is an increase in research on happiness, understood as a subjective perception of well-being, and it seems it is finding its place in criminology research as well.

=== Posttraumatic growth of South African ex-offenders ===
Positive criminology associates social integration with rehabilitation and with human strengths. Tharina Guse and Daphne Hudson, from the University of Johannesburg, South Africa, conducted a study in 2014.

=== Mindfulness and rehabilitation of young offenders ===
Positive criminology looks for integrative means of rehabilitation, as an alternative to the disintegrative nature of incarceration. In a qualitative study, Carla Barret from John Jay College, New York, attempted to understand how young male participants benefited from yoga and mindfulness training within an Alternative to Incarceration (ATI) program.

=== Angola's Christian seminary ===
Michael Hallett and colleagues presented an ethnographic account of the "self-projects" of inmate graduates of Louisiana State Penitentiary's ("Angola's") unique prison seminary program.
