= Integrative criminology =

Interdisciplinary paradigm

Integrative criminology reacts against single theory or methodology approaches, and adopts an interdisciplinary paradigm for the study of criminology and penology. Integration is not new. It informed the groundbreaking work of Merton (1938), Sutherland (1947), and Cohen (1955), but it has become a more positive school over the last twenty years (see Messner 1989).

== The problems ==
The conceptual difficulty is to retain the utility of the substance while considering form. The rule should be not to integrate unless there is a measurable benefit. Systems theory believes that isomorphism can be identified in all disciplines, and better understanding will result from finding and using that common material in an integrated theory. But there is a danger of reductionism or of creating mere abstraction in a metatheory where concepts are simply grouped within concepts. This arises from the easily generalised hypotheses about what human nature is, why people conform or do not conform, how an individual can be both the cause and consequence of society, and why deviancy is both subjective and diachronic. The temptation is to produce a "General" or "Unified" Theory, bringing all the previously separated strands together, but ignoring the fact that to be separate theories, there must have been methodologically consistent research and analysis. This is also assuming that all theories are partly correct, partly wrong, and none wholly adequate on their own. Since society should be aiming for rationality in its justice and punishment systems, it is important to re-evaluate the concepts of social control, but the intention should be to formulate new research to challenge assumptions (e.g. that what integrates society does not have to be the same thing that socialises people) or devise better operationalised hypotheses (e.g. to develop an equivalent scale for the measurement of different rewards and costs) on a more comprehensive basis rather than merely seeking confirmation that one existing theory is more valid than another.

== Discussion ==
Theories of crime and punishment have become increasingly diverse as the phenomenon of diversity has been studied by the medical, psychological, behavioural, social, economic, and political sciences. One consequence has been the abandonment of bipolar debates, e.g. as to the merits of the Classical School as against the Positivist School or free will versus determinism, or deviancy versus conformity. The proposition that a complex social phenomenon such as crime and its punishment can be researched using a single philosophical tenet is less acceptable in a postmodern world given that analyses limited in their metamethodology or methodologies are likely to ignore more factors than they consider. Consequently, more criminologists and theorists are considering the adoption of integrative and/or interdisciplinary frameworks for new research, opening the door to the creative plurality of knowledge-based frameworks through which to explain human motivation, social organisation, and structural relationships.

According to Barak (1998), integration involves linking and/or synthesising the different models and theories into formulations of crime and crime control that are more comprehensive, but progress is slow as those who have power over the separate discipline discourses resist imperialist absorption into a more diffuse discourse. Brown (1989: 1) advocated a synthesis through narrative: "the conflict that exists in our culture between the vocabularies of scientific discourse and of narrative discourse, between positivism and romanticism, objectivism and subjectivism, and between system and lifeworld can be synthesised through a poetics of truth that views social science and society as texts." According to this view, language is neither a reflection of the world or of the mind. It is, instead, a social historical practice where the meaning of words are not taken from things or intentions, but arise from the socially co-ordinated actions of people. But such methodological proposals have met with little approval. For example, the Neo-Classical and Right Realism reliance on social control and social learning theory resists reference to issues of history, gender, economics, and law of interest to Marxist criminology, Feminist school, etc. and vici versa.

The methodology of integration may be:

- Structural. This links existing theories, or at least their main components, in a new format. This may involve reconceiving the causal variables or theorising that, under certain conditions, the causal processes of one theory interlock with those of other theories. Braithwaite (1989) suggests that "side-by-side integration" provides a more internally consistent sequencing of theoretical ingredients as later outcomes are shown to be conditional on earlier outcomes.
- Conceptual. This brings pre-existing theories together and demonstrates that they are achieving comparable results, only at different levels of analysis. The intention is to blend the elements into new theories.
- Assimilation. This allows different theories to be united into large conceptual frameworks without considering the interactive relationships and conditional effects that these theories may have on each other.

Modernist integrative theories vary in their scope. Some focus on particular types of behaviour or offenders in social process-micro modelling, e.g. Wilson and Herrnstein (1985) concentrated on predatory street behavior using a social learning-behavioural choice model that relies on both positivist determinism and classical free will as it considers possible links between criminality and heredity, impulsivity, low intelligence, family practices, school experiences, and the effects of mass media on the individual. Other integrationists develop social structure-macro models, e.g. Quinney (1977) articulated a political economy and culture of crime and crime control based class-structural analysis where domination and repression through criminalisation was directed by capitalists and their agents of control. Tittle (1995: 142) proposed a control balance theory contending that the "amount of control to which people are subject relative to the amount of control they can exercise affects their general probability of committing some deviant acts as well as the probability that they will commit specific types of deviance". It also argues that individuals' control ratios or that the control balancing process is subject to a host of internal and external contingencies that can vary over time. These and other new theories care less about theories per se than about the knowledge they represent, focusing on interactive, reciprocal, dialectical, or codetermination causality, challenging whether there is a correct ordering of causal variables or whether the relations are constant over time. (see also Messerschmidt (1997) which examines the factors of class, race, gender, etc. in the process of social construction that mediates crime in particular social contexts and differentiates them through time and place. Barak and Henry (1999) also link the study of culture with the study of crime, examining the diversity of vocabularies through which different people experience violence and different criminal justice organisations exercise their power.
