= Marxist criminology =

School of criminology

Marxist criminology is one of the schools of criminology. It parallels the work of the structural functionalism school which focuses on what produces stability and continuity in society but, unlike the functionalists, it adopts a predefined political philosophy. As in conflict criminology, it focuses on why things change, identifying the disruptive forces in industrialized societies, and describing how society is divided by power, wealth, prestige, and the perceptions of the world. It is concerned with the causal relationships between society and crime, i.e. to establish a critical understanding of how the immediate and structural social environment gives rise to crime and criminogenic conditions. William Chambliss and Robert Seidman explain that "the shape and character of the legal system in complex societies can be understood as deriving from the conflicts inherent in the structure of these societies which are stratified economically and politically."

Karl Marx argued that the law is the mechanism by which one social class, usually referred to as the "ruling class", keeps all the other classes in a disadvantaged position. Marx criticized Georg Wilhelm Friedrich Hegel for his German idealist view on law that gives "a transcendental sanction to the rules of existing society" and looking upon the criminal as "a free and self-determined being" rather than a "slave of justice" with "multifarious social circumstances pressing upon him". Thus, this school uses a Marxist lens through which, inter alia, to consider the criminalization process, and by which explain why some acts are defined as deviant whereas others are not. It is therefore interested in political crime, state crime, and state-corporate crime.

== Marxist criminological views ==
Marxism provides a systematic theoretical basis upon which to interrogate social structural arrangements, and the hypothesis that economic power is translated into political power substantially accounts for the general disempowerment of the majority who live in the modern state and the limitations of political discourse. Hence, whether directly or indirectly, it informs much of the research into social phenomena not only in criminology, but also in semiotics and the other disciplines which explore the structural relationships of power, knowledge, meaning, and positional interests within society.

Many criminologists agree that for a society to function efficiently, social order is necessary and that conformity is induced through a socialization process. "Law" is the label given to one of the means used to enforce the interests of the state. Hence, because each state is sovereign, the law can be used for any purpose. It is also common ground that, whether the society is meritocratic, democratic or autocratic, a small group emerges to lead. The reason for this group's emergence may be their ability to use power more effectively, or simple expediency in that, as population size grows, the delegation of decision-making powers to a group representative of the majority leads to more efficiency. Marxists are critical of the ideas, values, and norms of capitalist ideology, and characterize the modern state as being under the control of the group that owns the means of production. For example, William Chambliss (1973) examined the way in which the vagrancy laws were amended to reflect the interests of the ruling elite. He also looked at how British Colonial Law was applied in East Africa, so that the capitalist "ruling class" could profit from coffee plantations, and how the law in medieval England benefited feudal landowners. Similarly, other researchers have highlighted evidence that corporate crime is widespread but is rarely prosecuted.

These researchers assert that political power is used to reinforce economic inequality by embedding individual property rights in the law and that the resulting poverty is one of the causes of criminal activity as a means of survival. Marxists argue that a socialist society with communal ownership of the means of production would have much less crime. Indeed, Milton Mankoff asserts that there is much less crime in Western Europe than in the United States because Europe is more ‘Socialist’ than America. The implication of such views is that the solution to the "crime problem" is to engage in a socialist revolution.

A different issue emerges by applying Marx's theory of alienation. A proportion of crime is said to be the result of society offering only demeaning work with little sense of creativity. However, the characterization of some crime as "working-class crime" and portraying it as a response to oppression is problematic. It selectively labels crime committed by people simply on the basis of their membership of a class, without engaging in victimology to identify whether any particular class or group is most likely to be the victim of such crime (because many criminals are disinclined to travel far, working-class crime is often directed at working-class people who live in the same neighborhood). In fact, the social differentiation of crime may vary by age, class, ethnicity, gender, demographic, and locality. This can cause some individuals to be at greater risk to victimization simply based on their location or even daily routine. According to Miethe and Stafford, different roles correlate to risks of victimization, and "structural changes in activity patterns influence crime rates." The three necessary elements of victimization include "motivated offenders, suitable targets, and absence of capable guardians."

Further, if anomie (the feeling one has when there is no longer any type of regulation or predictability in one’s life) is a primary cause of crime, there should be a theory to explain why only some working-class people commit crimes. According to Charles R. Tittle, anomie can be considered one of eight theories or schools that "[imply] a negative association between socioeconomic status and the probability of criminal behavior." But if there is evidence that some individuals and, in some cases, entire groups are alienated from mainstream society, there should be detailed research into the effect that this has on society as a whole (normlessness). In such research, Marxism tends to focus on societal forces rather than the motives of individuals and their dualistic capacity for both right and wrong, moral and immoral. This can lead to a less comprehensive explanation of why people exercise their autonomy by choosing to act in particular ways. By comparison, in the sociology of deviance, Robert K. Merton borrows Durkheim's concept of anomie to form the Strain Theory. Merton argues that the real problem of alienation is not created by a sudden social change, as Durkheim proposed, but rather by a social structure that holds out the same goals to all its members without giving them equal means to achieve them. It is this lack of integration between what the culture calls for and what the structure permits that causes deviant behavior. Deviance then is a symptom of the social structure. Taylor et al. intend a combination of Interactionism and Marxism as a radical alternative to previous theories to formulate a "fully social theory of deviance".

Sociologically, deviance is "the violation of a social norm which is likely to result in condemnation or punishment for the violator." Marxist criminologists view the power to label behavior as "deviant" as arising partly from the unequal distribution of power within the state, and because the judgment carries the authority of the state, it attributes greater stigma to the prohibited behavior. This is true no matter what the political orientation of the state. All states enact laws which, to a greater or lesser extent, protect property. This may take the form of theft, or prohibit damage or trespass. Even though a theft law may not appear judgmental, a Marxist analysis of the conviction rates may detect inequalities in the way in which the law is applied. Thus, the decision whether to prosecute or to convict may be skewed by having the resources to employ a good lawyer. The same analysis may also show that the distribution of punishment for any given crime may vary according to the social class of the perpetrator. But, the law of theft exists to protect the interests of all those who own property. It does not discriminate by reference to the class of the owner. Indeed, few laws in any states are drafted to protect property interests by reference to class, and the acceptance and enforcement of laws generally depend on a consensus within the community that such laws meet local needs. In this, a comparison of the crime rates between states shows little correlation by reference to political orientation. Such correlations as do exist tend to reflect disparities between rich and poor, and features describing the development of the social and economic environment. Hence, the crimes rates are comparable in states where there are the largest disparities of wealth distribution, regardless of whether they are first, second or third world.

== Individual theorists ==
=== Willem Bonger ===
Dutch criminologist Willem Bonger believed in a causal link between crime and economic and social conditions. He asserted that crime is social in origin and a normal response to prevailing cultural conditions. In more primitive societies, he contended that survival requires more selfless altruism within the community. Once agricultural technology improved and a surplus of food was generated, systems of exchange and barter began offering the opportunity for selfishness. As capitalism emerged, there were social forces of competition and wealth, resulting in an unequal distribution of resources, avarice and individualism. Once self-interest and more egoistic impulses assert themselves, crime emerges. The poor would commit crime out of need or out of a sense of injustice. Hence, those with power exercise control and impose punishment, equating the definition of crime with harm or threat of harm to the property and business interests of the powerful. Although the inherent activities comprising, say, a theft, may be identical, theft by the poor will be given greater emphasis than theft by the rich. This will have two consequences: direct which will increase the pressure for survival in an unequal society, and indirect in that it will increase a sense of alienation among the poor. Crime in the streets was a result of the miserable conditions in which workers lived in competition with one another. He believed that poverty alone could not be a cause of crime but rather poverty coupled with individualism, materialism, false needs, racism, and the false masculinity of violence and domination among street thugs.

=== Thorsten Sellin ===
Thorsten Sellin was a sociologist at the University of Pennsylvania and one of the pioneers of scientific criminology. His method involved a comprehensive view of the subject incorporating historical, sociological, psychological, and legal factors into the analysis. He applied both Marxism and conflict theory to an examination of the cultural diversity of modern industrial society. In a homogeneous society, norms or codes of behavior will emerge and become laws where enforcement is necessary to preserve the unitary culture; where separate cultures diverge from the mainstream, those minority groups will establish their own norms. Socialization will therefore be to the subgroup and to the mainstream norms. When laws are enacted, they will represent the norms, values and interests of the dominant cultural or ethnic groups in a state which may produce border culture conflict. When the two cultures interact and one seeks to extend its influence into the other, each side is likely to react protectively. If the balance of power is relatively equal, an accommodation will usually be reached; if the distribution of power is unequal, the everyday behavior of the minority group may be defined as deviant. The more diversified and heterogeneous a society becomes, the greater the probability of more frequent conflict as subgroups who live by their own rules break the rules of other groups.

== Criticism ==
Ronald L. Akers has criticized Marxist criminology on the grounds that societies based on Marxist principles "have been unjust and repressive and do not represent a future for which criminologists should strive". Marxist criminology shares with anarchist criminology the view that crime has its origins in an unjust social order and that a radical transformation of society is desirable. Unlike Marxists, who propose that capitalism be replaced with socialism, anarchists reject all hierarchical or authoritarian structures of power.
