= Nurturant strategy =

Crime prevention strategy

Nurturant strategy is a crime prevention strategy that attempts to prevent development of crime through nurturing actions as part of early childhood intervention. The strategy works to improve early life experiences and channel child and adolescent development into desirable directions.

There are two main types of nurturant strategies: "those that improve early life experiences to forestall the development of strategic styles based on criminality, and those that channel child and adolescent development in an effort to improve the match between individuals and their environment."

== See also ==
- List of criminology topics
