= David Downes (sociologist) =

British sociologist and criminologist

David Downes is a British sociologist and criminologist and is professor emeritus of Social Administration at the London School of Economics.

Downes was one of the founder members in 1968 of the National Deviancy Conference. and in 1990 of the Mannheim Centre for Criminology at the London School of Economics.

== Publications ==
=== 1960s-1980s ===
- Downes, David and Flower, Fred (1965) 'Educating for Uncertainty' Fabian Tract 364, London: Fabian Society
- Downes, David (1966) 'The Delinquent Solution: A Study in Subcultural Theory', London: Routledge and Kegan Paul
- Downes, D.M., Davies, B.P., David, M.E., Stone, P. (1976) Gambling, work and leisure: a study across three areas. London: Routledge & Kegan Paul
- Downes, Davd (1979) 'Praxis makes perfect: A critique of critical criminology' in David Downes and Paul Rock (co-eds.) 'Deviant Interpretations: Problems in Criminological Theory', Oxford: Martin Robertson.
- Downes, David and Rock, Paul (1982) 'Understanding Deviance: A Guide to the Sociology of Crime and Rule-Breaking', Oxford: Oxford University Press.
- Downes, David (1983) 'Law and Order: Theft of an Issue', London: Fabian Society in association with the Labour Campaign for Criminal Justice.
- Downes, David (1986) "12 Criminological Hypotheses" in Philip Bean and David Whynes (eds.) 'Barbara Wootton: Social Science and Public Policy Essays in her Honour', London: Tavistock.
- Downes, David, (1988) Contrasts in Tolerance: Post-War Penal Policy in The Netherlands and England and Wales. Oxford: OUP, Clarendon
- Downes, David (1989) Ed. 'Crime and the City: Essays in Memory of John Barron Mays' London: Macmillan.
- Downes, David (1989) "Only disconnect: law and order, social policy and the community" in Martin Bulmer, Jane Lewis and David Piachaud (eds.) 'The Goals of Social Policy', London: Unwin Hyman.

=== 1990s ===
- Downes, David (1992) Ed. 'Unravelling Criminal Justice: Eleven British Studies', London: Macmillan.
- Downes, D.M. (1993) 'Employment Opportunities for Offenders', London: Home Office Occasional Paper.
- Downes, David (1995) 'Broken windows of opportunity: Crime, inequality and employment' in Helen Jones and John Lansley (eds.) 'Social Policy and the City: Papers from the 1993 Conference of the Social Policy Association' Aldershot: Ashgate.
- Downes, David (1998) "The Buckling of the Shields: Dutch Penal Policy 1985-1995" in 'Comparing Prison Systems' ed. by R. Weiss and N. South, Amsterdam: Gordon and Breach.
- Downes, David (1998) "Back to the future: the predictive value of social theories of delinquency", in Simon Holdaway and Paul Rock (eds.) 'Thinking about Criminology'. London: UCL Press.
- Downes, D. (1998) '"Toughing It Out": From Labour Opposition to Labour Government.' Policy Studies, 19, no. 3-4 (December 1998), pp.191–198.
- Downes, D. (1999) 'Crime and Deviance.' In: Sociology: Issues and Debates. Ed Taylor, S. Palgrave Macmillan,
- Downes, D. (1999) 'The Role of Employment and Training in Reducing Recidivism (Plenary Address).' Reinsercao Social Ministry of Justice, Portugal

=== 2000s ===
- Downes, D. (2001) 'Four Years Hard: New Labour and Crime Control.' Criminal Justice Matters 46, Winter 2001
- Downes, D. (2001) 'The "Macho" penal economy: Mass incarceration in the US - A European Perspective.' Punishment and Society 3, no. 1 (2001), pp. 61–80.
- Downes, D. (2001) 'The macho penal economy: Mass incarceration in the U.S. - a European perspective.' In: Mass Imprisonment: Social Causes and Consequences. Ed Garland, D. Sage,
- Downes, D. & Rock, P. (2003) Understanding Deviance. 4th edition. Oxford University Press,
- Downes, D. (2004) 'New Labour and the Lost Causes of Crime.' Criminal Justice Matters 55, Spring
- Downes, D.& Hansen, K. (2006) 'Welfare and punishment in comparative perspective.' In: Perspectives on punishment: The contours of control. Ed Armstrong, S. & McAra, L. Oxford University Press,
- Downes, D. & Morgan, R. (2006) 'No turning back: The politics of law and order into the millennium.' In; The Oxford Handbook of Criminology. 4th ed. Eds. Maguire, M., Morgan, R. & Reiner, R. Oxford University Press
- Newburn, Tim and Rock, Paul (eds.}{2006) 'The politics of crime control: Essays in honour of David Downes' Oxford University Press.
- Downes, D. & Morgan, R. (2002) 'The Skeletons in the Cupboard: The Politics of Law and Order at the Turn of the Millennium.' In: Oxford Handbook of Criminology. 3rd ed. Eds. Maguire, M., Morgan, R. & Reiner, R. Oxford University Press.
- Downes David, Rock Paul, Chinkin Christine and Gearty Conor (Eds.)(2007) 'Crime, Social Control and Human Rights: From moral panics to states of denial - Essays in honour of Stanley Cohen'. Cullompton: Willan.
- Downes, David and van Swaaningen, Rene (2007) 'The Road to Dystopia: Changes in the penal climate of the Netherlands' in Michalel Tonry and Catrien Bijleveld (eds.) 'Crime and Justice in the Netherlands', vol. 35 in 'Crime and Justice: A Review of Resarch', University of Chicago Press.
- Downes, David (2007) 'Visions of penal control in the Netherlands' in Michael Tonry (ed.) 'Crime, Punishment and Politics in Comparative Perspective' Vol. 36 in 'Crime and Justice: A Review of Research', University of Chicago Press.
- Downes, David (2008) Editor's Introduction to "Cracks in the Penal Harm Movement" by Listwan et al. Criminology and Public Policy 7, 3, 2008, 419-422.
- Downes, David (2012) 'Working Out of Crime', Farnham: Ashgate.
- Downes, David, Rock, Paul and McLaughlin, Eugene (2016) 'Understanding Deviance: A Guide to the Socioogy of Crime and Rule-Breaking' 7th. edition, Oxford University Press.
- Downes, D. (2021) 'The Rise and Fall of Penal Hope' Vol. III in The Official History of Criminal Justice in England and Wales, London: Routledge.
- Downes, D. and Newburn, T. (2023) 'The Politics of Law and Order' Vol. IV in the Official History of Criminal Justice in England and Wales, London: Routledge.
