= John Lea (criminologist) =

British left realist criminologist

John Lea is a British left realist criminologist. For many years he was based at the Centre for Criminology and the Crime and Conflict Research Centre, Middlesex University in the United Kingdom.

== Career ==
He graduated from the London School of Economics and Political Science, University of London with a BSc in economics in 1967, before gaining MSc's in Economics and Social Policy there too.

From 1997 until his retirement in 2003 he was Professor of Criminology at Middlesex University. He has subsequently been visiting professor at the Universities of Brighton, Leicester, Roehampton and Goldsmiths (University of London)

== Work ==
His research interests include policing, organised crime, the historical development of crime and criminal justice institutions, the role of the private sector in criminal justice and the relationship between crime, war and security.

Lea was one of the key founders of the left realist approach alongside Jock Young, Roger Matthews, Richard Kinsey and Ian Taylor, His book with Jock Young, 'What is to be Done About Law and Order?' (1984) was a founding text of the left realist school. This was followed by, (with Richard Kinsey and Jock Young) 'Losing the Fight Against Crime'(1986).

In 2015 he was awarded the British Society of Criminology Outstanding Achievement Award. (presented at the BSC Conference, Plymouth University, July)

== Publications and articles ==
=== 1970s ===
- Fine, B., Kinsey, R., Lea, J., Picciotto, S. & Young, J. (eds) (1979) Capitalism and the Rule of Law, London: Hutchinson

=== 1980s ===
- Lea, J. & Young, J. (1981) "The Riots in Britain 1981" In: Cowell, D., Jones, T. & Young, J. (eds) Policing the Riots, London: Junction
- Lea, J. & Young, J. (1982) "Race and Crime", Marxism Today, August pg.38-39
- Lea, J. & Young, J. (1984) What Is To Be Done About Law and Order — Crisis in the Eighties. Harmondsworth: Penguin. (Pluto Press revised edition: 1993) ISBN 0-7453-0735-3
- Kinsey, R., Lea, J. & Young, J. (1986). Losing the Fight Against Crime. London: Blackwell. ISBN 0-631-13721-1
- Lea, J. (1986) 'Police Racism: some theories and their policy implication' in Matthews, R. & Young, J. (eds) Confronting Crime, London: Sage Publications.
- Jones, T., Lea, J. & Young, J. (1987) Saving the Inner City: The First Report of the Broadwater Farm Survey, London: Middlesex Polytechnic
- Lea, J., Matthews, R. & Young, J. (1987) Law and Order: Five Years On, London: Middlesex Polytechnic, Centre for Criminology
- Lea J. (1987) 'Left Realism in Criminology: A Defence' (Contemporary Crises No 11) pp 357–370
- Lea, J., Jones, T., Woodhouse, T. & Young, J. (1989) Preventing Crime: The Hilldrop Environmental Improvement Survey, Enfield: Centre for Criminology, Middlesex Polytechnic
- Painter, K., Lea, J., Woodhouse, T. & Young, J. (1989) The Hammersmith and Fulham Crime and Policing Survey, London: Middlesex Polytechnic, Centre for Criminology

=== 1990s ===
- Lea, J. (1999). "'Social Crime Revisited'". Theoretical Criminology. 3 (3): 307–325. doi:10.1177/1362480699003003003. S2CID 144985928.

=== 2000s ===
- Lea J. (2000) ‘The Macpherson Report and the Question of Institutional Racism’ Howard Journal of Criminal Justice vol 39 No 3.pp 219–233
- Lea J. (2002). Crime and Modernity: Continuities in Left Realist Criminology. London: Sage. ISBN 0-8039-7557-0
- Lea J. (2004) 'Hitting Criminals where it hurts: organised crime and the erosion of due process' Cambrian Law Review vol 35: 81–9
- Lea, J. (2010) 'Left Realism, Community and State Building' Crime, Law and Social Change 54: 141–158.
- Lea, J. (2011) (with Simon Hallsworth) 'Reconstructing Leviathan: Emerging contours of the security state' Theoretical Criminology 15(2): 141–157
- Lea, J. (2012) (with Peter Squires) Criminalisation and advanced marginality: critically exploring the work of Loic Wacquant. Bristol: Policy Press ISBN 9781447300014
- Lea, J. (2015) 'From the Criminalisation of War to the Militarisation of Crime Control' in Sandra Walklate & Ross McGarry eds. Criminology and War: Transgressing the Borders. London: Routledge
- Lea, J, (2016) War, Criminal Justice and the Rebirth of Privatisation' in Ross McGarry and Sandra Walklate eds. The Palgrave Handbook of Criminology and War. London: Palgrave
- Lea, J. (2016) Left realism: A radical criminology for the current crisis. International Journal for Crime, Justice and Social Democracy 5(3): DOI: 10.5204/ijcjsd.v5i3.329
- Lea, J. (2017) (With Wendy Fitzgibbon) 'Privatisation and coercion: The question of legitimacy' Theoretical Criminology. (online May 2017)
- Lea, J. (2020) (With Wendy Fitzgibbon) Privatising Justice: the security industry, war and crime control. London: Pluto
