= Roger Matthews (criminologist) =

British criminologist (1948–2020)

Roger Matthews (1948 – 7 April 2020 ), was a British criminologist. He was a professor of criminology at the University of Kent, Canterbury, United Kingdom. Prior to joining the University of Kent, he was a professor of criminology at London South Bank University and Middlesex University.

Matthews is known as one of the key figures in left realism, a criminological critique of both the dominant administrative criminology and the critical criminology ("left idealism").

He died on 7 April 2020 at the age of 71 from the effects of the COVID-19 virus.

== Publications ==
- Matthews, R. & Young, J. (eds) (1986) Confronting Crime, London: Sage Publications
- Matthews, R. (1988) Informal Justice?, London: Sage
- Matthews, R. (1988) Privatizing Criminal Justice, London: Sage
- Matthews, R. (1988) 'Alternatives to and in Prison: a Realist approach' In: Carlen, P. & Cook, D. eds. Paying For Crime, Milton Keynes: Open University Press
- Matthews, R. & Young, J. (eds) (1992) Rethinking Criminology: The Realist Debate, (Sage Contemporary Criminology) London: Sage. ISBN 0-8039-8621-1
- Matthews, R. & Young, J. (eds) (1992) Issues in Realist Criminology, (Sage Contemporary Criminology) London: Sage. ISBN 0-8039-8624-6
- Matthews, R. and P. Francis (eds) (1996) Prisons 2000: An International Perspective on the Current State and Future of Imprisonment. Macmillan. ISBN 0-333-64480-8
- Matthews, R. (1999) Doing Time: An Introduction to the Sociology of Imprisonment. Macmillan/Palgrave. ISBN 0-333-75231-7.
- Matthews, R. and Pitts, J. (eds) (2001) Crime, Disorder and Community Safety: A New Agenda? Routledge.ISBN 0-415-24231-2
- Matthews, R. (2002) Armed Robbery. Willan. ISBN 1-903240-60-3
- Matthews, R. & Young, J. (2003) The New Politics of Crime and Punishment, Willan. ISBN 1-903240-91-3
- Matthews, R. (2005) 'The Myth of Punitiveness', Theoretical Criminology, 9(2): 175–20
- Matthews, R. Easton, H. Briggs, D. and Pease, K. (2007) "Assessing the Impact of Anti-Social Behaviour Orders": Policy Press ISBN 978-1-84742-057-2
- Matthews, R. (2008) Prostitution, Politics and Policy. Routledge-Cavendish. ISBN 978-0-415-45917-4.
- Matthews, R. (2009) Doing Time: An Introduction to the Sociology of Imprisonment' Second Edition. Palgrave/Macmillan. ISBN 978-0-230-23552-6
- Matthews, R. (2009) 'Beyond "So What?" Criminology: Rediscovering Realism' Theoretical Criminology 13 (3):341-62.
- Matthews, R. (2010) 'Realist Criminology Revisited" in E. McLaughlin and T. Newburn (eds) The Sage Handbook of Criminological Theory. ISBN 978-1-4129-2038-4
