= Cultural criminology =

Anthropological view of crime

Cultural criminology is a subfield in the study of crime that focuses on the ways in which the "dynamics of meaning underpin every process in criminal justice, including the definition of crime itself." In other words, cultural criminology seeks to understand crime through the context of culture and cultural processes. Rather than representing a conclusive paradigm per se, this particular form of criminological analysis interweaves a broad range of perspectives that share a sensitivity to “image, meaning, and representation” to evaluate the convergence of cultural and criminal processes.

As opposed to other theories, cultural criminology views crime in the context of an offenders culture as a motive to commit crime. The theory gives motives to a crime, whereas other theories, such as rational choice theory, explain what was gained.

== Background ==
Sociologist Jack Katz is recognized by many as being a foundational figure to this approach through his seminal work, Seductions of Crime, written in 1988. Cultural criminology as a substantive approach, however, did not begin to form until the mid-1990s, where increasing interest arose from the desire to incorporate cultural studies into contemporary criminology. Developed in both the United States and the United Kingdom, the approach has had transnational impacts.

Recent theories within cultural criminology take into account the role of space (such as urban space) in the construction of crime, positing, for example, that where an action takes place is as important as the effect of the action in determining criminality. The roles of excitement and control in cultural criminology has laid the foundation for the sociological concept of "edgework". Edgework's focus on prototypically masculine, high-risk pursuits has been criticised by a number of feminist criminologists. More recent works, however, suggest that edgework can be applied to either gender.

=== Purpose ===
In Katz (1988) and other works, the goal is to find the overlap between the emotions associated with everyday life and those associated with crime. As such, one of the main tenets of cultural criminology is the role of affect in crime.

Jeff Ferrell, cited by many scholars as a forerunner of the subfield as it is known today, describes the purpose of cultural criminology as being to investigate “the stylized frameworks and experiential dynamics of illicit subcultures; the symbolic criminalization of popular culture forms; and the mediated construction of crime and crime control issues.” Moreover, the approach has often been used to demonstrate the ways in which power affects the construction of crime, such as the creation and breaking of law, as well as the interplay of moral entrepreneurship, moral innovation, and transgression.

=== Influences ===
Since the approach itself consists of a mélange of various perspectives linked together by dynamics of meaning, deliberations in this domain often invoke an assortment of theoretical elements. Cultural criminological analysis unambiguously roots itself in interactionist and constructionist tradition. More specifically, such approach concedes Howard Becker’s (1963) labelling theory, while augmenting it with a phenomenological dimension that considers the “webs of meaning and perception in which all parties are entangled.”

Along with interactionist and constructionist theories, as well as ideas posed by Katz and Becker, cultural criminological work tends to explicitly cite, or be reminiscent of, the following theories and/or theorists among others:

- Jean Baudrillard and his theory of “simulacra”
- Max Weber
- Clifford Geertz and the "webs of significance"
- Mike Presdee and his theory of the “carnival of crime”
- Jeff Ferrell
- Keith Hayward
- Ethnography
- Textual Analysis
- Media Analysis
- Visual Criminology
- Semiology
- Phenomenology
- Mimesis,
- Social ontology
- General strain theory
- Criminal psychology

== Methods ==
Originally, cultural criminologists utilized one of two main research methods: either ethnographic and fieldwork techniques, or the main qualitative research techniques associated with the scholarly readings. Cultural criminologists today also employ research methods such as participatory action research or "narrative criminology". They remain constant, however, in their rejection of abstract empiricism, positivism and administrative criminology; these rejections and criticisms were influenced by C. Wright Mills in his seminal work The Sociological Imagination and then further developed in The Criminological Imagination by Jock Young.

== Criticism ==
A key criticism of cultural criminology states that the perspective romanticizes the criminal which downplays the severity of criminal action. However, theorists such as Jock Young remind critics that the aims of cultural criminology is to place deviancy within a context of culture, regardless of how the criminal comes across.
