= International crime =

International crime may refer to:

- International criminal law, a body of law that defines four main categories of international crimes
  - Genocide
  - Crimes against humanity
  - War crimes
  - Crime of aggression
- Transnational crime, a crime with actual or potential effect across national borders
- International Crime (1938 film), a film directed by Charles Lamont
