= Phenomenological criminology =

Phenomenological criminology is an outlook on the causation of crime. Its roots are derived from phenomenology, that an idea is relevant only to the human mind and human consciousness, and imperceptible to the outside world. Its relation to criminology claims that any action of a criminal nature would have been committed for a reason only knowable to the participants. In this sense, it is impossible for the victim or an independent service – justice system – to understand its meaning or purpose.
