= Walter DeKeseredy =

American criminologist

- Born: Walter Steven DeKeseredy; March 6, 1959 (age 67)
- Known for: Research on violence against women
- Scientific career
- Fields: Criminology
- Institutions: Carleton University; West Virginia University
- Thesis: Woman abuse in dating relationships: The role of male peer support (1988)

Walter Steven DeKeseredy (born March 6, 1959) is the Anna Deane Carlson Endowed Chair of Social Sciences at West Virginia University, where he is also director of the Research Center on Violence and professor of sociology.

He received his Ph.D. from York University in 1988, and formerly taught at Carleton University. He is known for his research on violence against women, which he has been studying for more than thirty years. In particular, he is known for studying the role of threats to masculinity in male violence against women.
