= Conflict criminology =

School of criminology

Largely based on the writings of Karl Marx, conflict criminology holds that crime in capitalist societies cannot be adequately understood without a recognition that such societies are dominated by a wealthy elite whose continuing dominance requires the economic exploitation of others, and that the ideas, institutions and practices of such societies are designed and managed in order to ensure that such groups remain marginalised, oppressed and vulnerable. Members of marginalised and oppressed groups may sometimes turn to crime in order to gain the material wealth that apparently brings equality in capitalist societies, or simply in order to survive. Conflict criminology derives its name from the fact that theorists within the area believe that there is no consensual social contract between state and citizen.

== Discussion ==
Conflict theory assumes that every society is subjected to a process of continuous change and that this process creates social conflicts. Hence, social change and social conflict are ubiquitous. Individuals and social classes, each with distinctive interests, represent the constituent elements of a society. As such, they are individually and collectively participants in this process but there is no guarantee that the interests of each class will coincide. Indeed, the lack of common ground is likely to bring them into conflict with each other. From time to time, each element's contribution may be positive or negative, constructive or destructive. To that extent, therefore, the progress made by each society as a whole is limited by the acts and omissions of some of its members by others. This limitation may promote a struggle for greater progress but, if the less progressive group has access to the coercive power of law, it may entrench inequality and oppress those deemed less equal. In turn, this inequality will become a significant source of conflict. The theory identifies the state and the law as instruments of oppression used by the ruling class for their own benefit.

There are various strands of conflict theory, with many heavily critiquing the others. Structural Marxist criminology, which is essentially the most 'pure' version of the above, has been frequently accused of idealism, and many critics point to the fact that the Soviet Union and such states had as high crime rates as the capitalist West. Furthermore, some highly capitalist states such as Switzerland have very low crime rates, thus making structural theory seem improbable.

Instrumental Marxism partly holds to the above, but claims that capitalism in itself cannot be blamed for all crimes. A seminal book on the subject, The New Criminology, by Taylor, Walton, and Young, was considered groundbreaking and ahead of its time at the point of its publication in 1973. However, 11 years later, co-author Jock Young turned against the work, claiming it too was overly idealistic, and began to form yet another line of criminological thought, now commonly known as Left realism.

== Theorists ==
=== Thorsten Sellin ===
Sellin was a sociologist at the University of Pennsylvania and one of the pioneers of scientific criminology. His method involved a comprehensive view of the subject, incorporating historical, sociological, psychological, and legal factors into the analysis. He applied both Marxism and Conflict Theory to an examination of the cultural diversity of modern industrial society. In a homogeneous society, norms or codes of behaviour will emerge and become laws where enforcement is necessary to preserve the unitary culture. But where separate cultures diverge from the mainstream, those minority groups will establish their own norms. Socialization will therefore be to the subgroup and to the mainstream norms. When laws are enacted, they will represent the norms, values and interests of the dominant cultural or ethnic group which may produce border culture conflict. When the two cultures interact and one seeks to extend its influence into the other, each side is likely to react protectively. If the balance of power is relatively equal, an accommodation will usually be reached. But if the distribution of power is unequal, the everyday behavior of the minority group may be defined as deviant. The more diversified and heterogeneous a society becomes, the greater the probability of more frequent conflict as subgroups who live by their own rules break the rules of other groups.

=== George Vold ===
Vold introduced the theory in 1958, in Theoretical Criminology, approaching an understanding of the social nature of crime as a product of the conflict between groups within the same culture. Humans are naturally social beings, forming groups out of shared interests and needs. The interests and needs of groups interact and produce competition in an increasingly political arena over maintaining and/or expanding one group's position relative to others in the control of necessary resources (money, education, employment, etc.). The challenge for all groups is to control the state for their own sectional interests. Hence, the group which proves most efficient in the control of political processes, obtains the mandate to enact laws that limit the behaviour of other groups and, in some cases, prevent the fulfillment of minority group needs. Although the theory has some interest, it is limited in its application to the criminal law because it is not so much the law that represents sectional interests, but the way in which it is enforced. For example, the definition of theft might remain constant but the allocation of resources to investigate and prosecute theft may be unequally distributed between blue-collar and white-collar versions of the behaviour.

=== Austin Turk ===
Turk draws on the work of Ralf Dahrendorf, who expanded on Marxism's emphasis on the social relations of production as a key to understanding power and focused on the struggle in a modern industrial society for institutional authority. This is power exercised by the social institutions that dominate everyday life; the authority vested in groups which control key positions in religious, educational, governmental, and even family relations. This authority can be linked to economic position, but it is not necessarily dependent upon it. Turk argues that some conflict is beneficial to society because it encourages society to consider whether the current consensus is justified, i.e. there is a balance between stasis and evolution. In this debate, there is a distinction between cultural norms which set out what behaviour is expected, and social norms which represent the reality of what happens. Those who have the power transform their cultural norms into law. The mechanisms for enforcement determine the social norms and so affect the beliefs and actions of the majority of citizens. If those who are subject to the laws agree with the law's cultural values, there will be co-operative enforcement by the community and the policing agencies. Conflict emerges when the subjects do not support the cultural norms in particular laws and the policing agencies attempt their rigorous enforcement, e.g. the policing of soft drugs. There may also be conflict within the enforcement system. Whereas the police may set of policy of tolerance, judges may wish to enforce the law with more severe penalties. If fewer offenders are brought before the courts, the judges may increase the severity of the sentences in an attempt to offer a general deterrent.
