= Alma Preinkert =

American university administrator

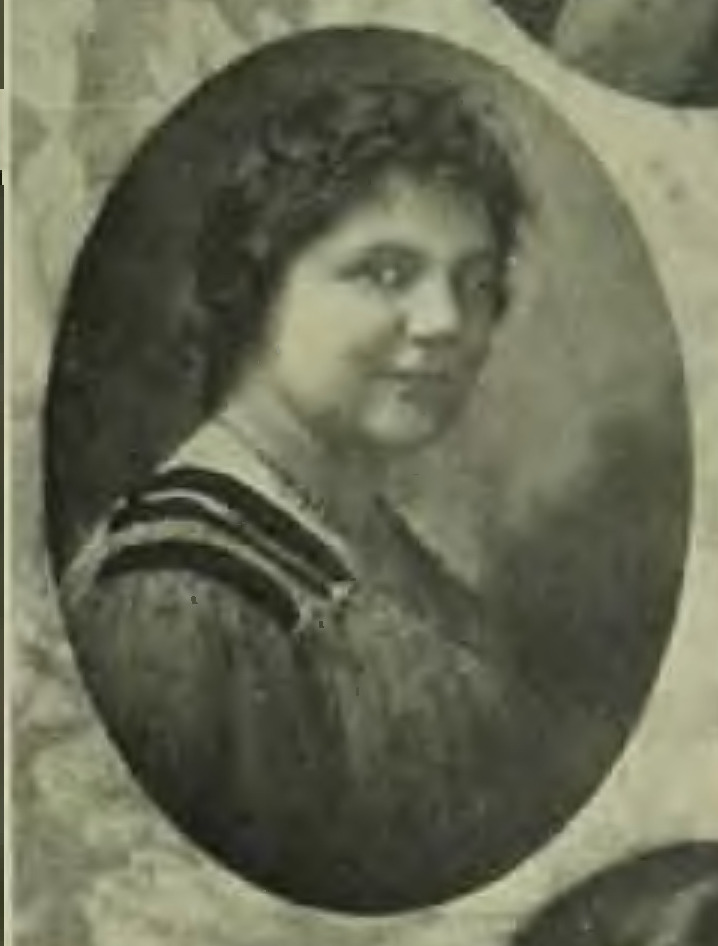
- Alma Preinkert in 1916
- Occupations: Registrar, registrar
- Employers: University of Maryland; University of Maryland (1936–1954)

Alma Preinkert (October 22, 1895 – February 28, 1954) was the registrar at the University of Maryland before being murdered by an intruder at her Washington, D.C. home. A Maryland alumna and a beloved figure in the university community, her murder sent shockwaves through the area. Although a large investigation ensued, her attacker was never identified.

A building on the university's College Park campus, the Preinkert Field House (which currently contains the National Center for Smart Growth and the Environmental Finance Center), and Preinkert Drive are named after Alma Preinkert.

== See also ==
- List of unsolved murders (1900–1979)

== Selected publications ==
- Preinkert, A. H., and American Association of Collegiate Registrars and Admissions Officers. (1940). The work of the registrar: A summary of principles and practices in American universities and colleges. Washington, DC: American Association of Collegiate Registrars and Admissions Officers.
