= Reciprocal obligation =

Type of agreement

In law, a reciprocal obligation, also known as a reciprocal agreement, is a duty owed by one individual to another and vice versa. It is a type of agreement that bears upon or binds two parties in an equal manner.
