= Critical Criminology (journal) =

- Discipline: Criminology
- Language: English
- Edited by: David Brotherton and Jayne Mooney

Publication details
- Former name(s): The Journal of Human Justice
- History: 1989-present
- Publisher: Springer Science+Business Media
- Impact factor: 1.838 (2020)

Standard abbreviations
- ISO 4: Crit. Criminol.

Indexing
- Critical Criminology
- ISSN: 1205-8629 (print); 1572-9877 (web)
- Journal of Human Justice
- ISSN: 0847-2971

Links
- Journal homepage; Online archive

Critical Criminology: An International Journal, and formerly The Journal of Human Justice (JHJ), is a peer-reviewed academic journal covering criminology from unconventional perspectives. It was established in 1989 and is the official journal of the Division on Critical Criminology and Social Justice of the American Society of Criminology, (Note: Note: Change of name ratified 2016.) and of the Academy of Criminal Justice Sciences Section on Critical Criminology.

It has been published by Springer Science+Business Media since 2006 and as of 2023 the editors in chief are David Brotherton and Jayne Mooney. Its focus is broader than a standard definition of crime, focusing on "issues of social harm and social justice", and it strives to showcase collaborative efforts towards solving complex issues which might help build a society which eliminates or minimises exclusion on the basis of gender, race, class and other differences among people. It has been published quarterly since 2006, having previously been published twice or three times a year.

The journal began life as The Journal of Human Justice in 1989, created by the Human Justice Collective in Vancouver, with its first issue focused on Canada. The last issue under this name was v. 6, no. 2, in 1995. In 1996 it was published by the American Society of Criminology's Division on Critical Criminology in the Vancouver suburb of Richmond in Canada as Critical Criminology: An International Journal and, after an hiatus in publication between 1998 and 1999, has continued under this name until the present (2020).
