= Peacemaking criminology =

Peacemaking criminology is a non-violent movement against oppression, social injustice and violence as found within criminology, criminal justice and society in general. With its emphasis on inter-personal, intra-personal and spiritual integration, it is well connected to the emerging perspective of positive criminology.

According to the writer John E. Conklin, "peacemaking criminology regards crime as the product of a social structure that puts some groups at a disadvantage, sets people against one another, and generates a desire for revenge."

Peacemaking criminology emerged from work in anarchist criminology, which applies anarchist principles to criminological inquiry. Jeff Shantz and Dana M. Williams argue that the thought of Pierre-Joseph Proudhon was a precursor of peacemaking criminology and restorative justice. More recently, Harold Pepinsky's 1978 article on "communist anarchism as an alternative to the rule of criminal law" introduced the fundamentals of the peacemaking approach.
