= Postmodernist school (criminology) =

The postmodernist school in criminology applies postmodernism to the study of crime and criminals. It is based on an understanding of "criminality" as a product of the use of power to limit the behaviour of those individuals excluded from power, but who try to overcome social inequality and behave in ways which the power structure prohibits. It focuses on the identity of the human subject, multiculturalism, feminism, and human relationships to deal with the concepts of "difference" and "otherness" without essentialism or reductionism, but its contributions are not always appreciated. Postmodernists shift attention from Marxist concerns of economic and social oppression to linguistic production, arguing that criminal law is a language to create dominance relationships.

For example, the language of courts (the so-called "legalese") expresses and institutionalises the domination of the individual, whether accused or accuser, criminal or victim, by social institutions. According to postmodernist criminology, the discourse of criminal law is dominant, exclusive and rejecting, less diverse, and culturally not pluralistic, exaggerating narrowly defined rules for the exclusion of others.

== Definitional issues ==
Postmodernism is associated with relativism and a focus on the role of ideology in the maintenance of economic and political power. Postmodernists are "skeptical of explanations which claim to be valid for all groups, cultures, traditions, or races, and instead focuses on the relative truths of each person".

A crime might be defined on the basis that the behaviour represents a danger to society and it is designated as such in the penal code (nullum crimen sine lege the Latin presumption that there can be no crime without a law defining it as such). Human activity extends its range as society develops, and any of these activities (with or without reason) may be considered harmful for people and are therefore “extinguished” by society either through informal moral condemnation or by the state when formal legal restrictions are infringed. There are overlapping explanations of criminality:

- There is nothing inherently "criminal" in any given act; crime and criminality are relative terms, social constructs reflecting diachronic social policies, e.g. one killing may be murder, another justifiable homicide.
- Hess and Scheerer (1997) suggest that criminality is not so much an ontological phenomenon as a mental construct having an historical and protean character.
- Society “constructs” its elements on the basis of ontological realities. Thus, in reality certain types of human activity are harmful and damaging, and are understood and judged so by others, by society as a whole. But it is also true that other forms of criminal behaviour do not harm others and are therefore criminalised without sufficient ontological grounds (see Public order crime).
- Criminality is almost completely constructed by the controlling institutions which establish norms and attribute determinate meanings to certain acts; criminality is thus a social and linguistic construct.

This difficulty in defining the basic concept of criminality applies equally to questions concerning its causes; even in physical and biological systems it is difficult, although not impossible, to isolate the cause-effect link from its context of interrelationships. It is more difficult for social systems. Indeed, some argue that chaos theory may provide a more appropriate model for what is termed the "social sciences". Thus, for postmodernism, the key “criminogenic” factor is the change in society from hierarchical relationships to ones based on differentiation with the meta-codes for identity as the determinant for social inclusion/exclusion.

== Theoretical concerns ==
Postmodernism is associated with the decline of the left's credibility, specifically in the failure of state socialism to offer an attractive and, later, even a viable alternative to Western capitalism. Both Marxism and socialism derived their philosophical foundation from the Enlightenment. Postmodernism is a critique of the Enlightenment and of scientific positivism which has argued that the world can be understood and both "truth" and "justice" can be discovered by applying the universal linear principle of reason (see Milovanovic, who describes the shift from Hegelian to Nietzschean and Lacanian thought). The idea that the application of scientific principles to social life will uncover the laws of society, making human life predictable and social engineering practical and possible, is discounted.

Postmodernists argue that this claim for the universality of reason was ethnocentric in that it privileged one Western view of the world while discounting other views, and truth claims were part of a relationship of domination, a claim to power. Given the history of colonialism and globalisation in both the physical and the intellectual world, this critique asserts righteous indignation and moral superiority. In postmodernism, "truth" and "falsity" are purely relative; each culture has its own standard for judging truth that is not inherently superior to any other. Postmodernist analysis is a method to uncover how the world is made to appear real, "thereby questioning that it is real in truth or fact, or that there is any way of making such judgements". No truth claim, and certainly not Enlightenment scientism, rests on any more secure foundation than any other. No knowledge claim is privileged.

The main weakness of relativism is that it offers no basis for evaluation. Henry and Milovanovic (1996) posit that all claims are to be considered valid, all social practices merely cultural variations, neither inherently inferior nor superior to any other. This may be potentially progressive because it challenges the absolutist assumptions of the superiority of, for example, Western economics and capitalism. But it does not challenge the status quo. On the contrary, as Kiely argues, appeals for tolerance and pluralism "at its worse . . . simply ignores, or even becomes an apology for, all kinds of oppressive practices" that violate any sense of human and social rights.

=== The human subject ===
The human subject is said to be one or a number of ideological constructions which are transient, multifaceted works-in-process. The discourse has the power to create a convincing truth claim about the reality of any subject that is historically conditioned, particularly when depicting human action. Subjects are continually recreating themselves while simultaneously continually recreating the social context that shapes their identity and potential for action as well as the identity and potential of others to act. Human agents are all "investors" in constructing their version of reality. Praxis is defined as purposive social activity born of human agents' consciousness of their world, and mediated through the social groups to which they belong. It assumes dualistic forms, such as negation/affirmation. Hierarchies are often reconstituted through negation; they are subject to deconstruction through affirmation.

=== Structure ===
The human subject is a "role-maker", an agent who can occupy situations and may act contingently in relation to others to affirm or negate their representations. Whereas early conceptions of structure posited an underlying "reality" which could be understood empirically, postmodernism, considers structural contexts to be constituted by the discourse to produce culturally and historically specific representations which are imbued with object-like reality and attain relative stability. In this process, other representations are silenced or denied and the human agency that constituted the contingent and transitory "reality" may be hidden. At any instance, however, certain depictions gain ascendancy and are strengthened by social action which is undertaken in relation to them.

Social actors "invest" in these depictions; they organise action to defend specific representations, giving them the appearance of stability and producing the dynamics of subordination and oppression. Social change creates competing discourses and, for a time, alternative realities. When change begins, initial states are always uncertain and through iteration over time, produce outcomes. Inevitably, as change is occurring, cracks and slippage exist, providing the basis for strategic intervention. Action is then organised to defend or deny the representation. In the end, structures as well as subjects possess "relative autonomy" while being co-dependent.

=== Crime and harmfulness ===
Crime and the identification of harm are categories constituted by the discourse but they are, nevertheless, "real" in their consequences. There may be harms of reduction, which occur when a social agent experiences a loss of some quality, and harms of repression, which occur when a social agent experiences a restriction preventing the achievement of a desired end. Crime is the outcome of an agent's "investment" in constituting a difference which, through the exercise of "disrespecting" power over others, denies their full humanity and, thereby, renders them powerless to constitute their own differences. Far from being confined to "law", in this expanded view, the exercise of power is the genesis of harms of all types and, hence, of crime. Law merely legitimises existing social relations of power.

Crime, then, is a contingent "universality": Victims are numerous but are constituted contingently, relative to historically specifiable relations of power. Power itself is produced and maintained through ideology, through discursive practices. While all humans invest in their respective constructions of reality, some become "excessive investors", conflating socially constructed differences with differential evaluations of worth, reinforcing a social hierarchy while suppressing others' co-production, rendering them silent.
