= Critical criminology =

School of criminology

Critical criminology applies critical theory to criminology. Critical criminology examines the genesis of crime and the nature of justice in relation to power, privilege, and social status. These include factors such as class, race, gender, and sexuality. Legal and penal systems are understood to reproduce and uphold systems of social inequality. Additionally, critical criminology works to uncover possible biases within traditional criminological research.

Critical criminology sees crime as a product of oppression of workers – in particular, those in greatest poverty – and less-advantaged groups within society, such as women and ethnic minorities, are seen to be the most likely to suffer oppressive social relations based upon class division, sexism and racism. More simply, critical criminology can be understood as an area of criminology that focuses on the impacts of power, domination, and oppression in ways that are often neglected by mainstream criminology. Critical criminologists focus on the larger systemic factors of crime.

== Convict criminology ==
Convict criminology, which is one type of critical criminology, emerged in the United States during the late 1990s. It offers an alternative epistemology on crime, criminality and punishment. Scholarship is conducted by PhD-trained former prisoners, prison workers and others who share a belief that in order to be a fully rounded discipline, mainstream criminology needs to be informed by input from those with personal experience of life in correctional institutions. Contributions from academics who are aware of the day-to-day realities of incarceration, the hidden politics that infuse prison administration, and the details and the nuances of prison language and culture, have the potential significantly to enrich scholarly understanding of the corrections system. In addition, convict criminologists have been active in various aspects of correctional reform advocacy, particularly where prisoner education is concerned.

== Socially contingent definitions of crime ==
Critical criminologists assert that how crime is defined is socially and historically contingent, that is, what constitutes a crime varies in different social situations and different periods of history. The conclusion that critical criminological theorists draw from this is that crime is socially constructed by the state and those in power.

One way that the social construction of crime can be conceptualized is through examining the criminalization of homosexuality. Homosexuality was illegal in the United Kingdom until 1967 when it became legalized for men over the age of 21. For critical criminologists, the criminalization of the LGBTQ+ community by the state reflects the social construction of crime, as it has since been found that there is being a part of the community is not inherently criminal. Additionally, critical theory would assert that the criminalization of homosexuality is an explicit use power by the state to control marginalized populations.

Whilst there are many variations on the critical theme in criminology, the term critical criminology has become a guiding principle for perspectives that take to be fundamental the understanding that certain acts are crimes because certain people have the power to make them so. The reliance on what has been seen as the oppositional paradigm, administrational criminology, which tends to focus on the criminological categories that governments wish to highlight (mugging and other street crime, violence, burglary, and, as many critical criminologists would contend, predominantly the crimes of the poor) can be questioned.

The gap between what these two paradigms suggest is of legitimate criminological interest, It is stated by Stephen Box in his book Power, Crime, and Mystification where he asserts that one is seven times more likely (or was in 1983) to be killed as a result of negligence by one's employer, than one was to be murdered in the conventional sense (when all demographic weighting had been taken into account).

The effect of this, critical criminologists tend to claim, is that conventional criminologies fail to 'lay bare the structural inequalities which underpin the processes through which laws are created and enforced' and that 'deviancy and criminality' are 'shaped by society's larger structure of power and institutions'. Further failing to note that power represents the capacity 'to enforce one's moral claims' permitting the powerful to 'conventionalize their moral defaults' legitimizing the processes of 'normalized repression'. Thus, fundamentally, critical criminologists are critical of state definitions of crime, choosing instead to focus upon notions of social harm or human rights.

== Conflict theories ==
According to criminologists, working in the conflict tradition, crime is the result of conflict within societies that is brought about through the inevitable processes of capitalism. Dispute exists between those who espouse a 'pluralist' view of society and those who do not. Pluralists, following from writers like Mills (1956, 1969 for example) are of the belief that power is exercised in societies by groups of interested individuals (businesses, faith groups, government organizations for example)– vying for influence and power to further their own interests. These criminologists like Vold have been called 'conservative conflict theorists'. They hold that crime may emerge from economic differences, differences of culture, or from struggles concerning status, ideology, morality, religion, race or ethnicity. These writers are of the belief that such groups, by claiming allegiance to mainstream culture, gain control of key resources permitting them to criminalize those who do not conform to their moral codes and cultural values. (Selin 1938; Vold 1979 [1958]; Quinney 1970 inter alia). These theorists, therefore, see crime as having roots in symbolic or instrumental conflict occurring at multiple sites within a fragmented society.

Others are of the belief that such 'interests', particularly symbolic dimensions such as status are epiphenomenological by-products of more fundamental economic conflict (Taylor, Walton & Young 1973; Quinney 1974, for example). For these theorists, societal conflict from which crime emerges is founded on the fundamental economic inequalities that are inherent in the processes of capitalism (see, for example, Wikipedia article on Rusche and Kirchheimer's Punishment and Social Structure, a book that provides a seminal exposition of Marxian analysis applied to the problem of crime and punishment). Drawing on the work of Marx (1990 [1868]); Engels, (1984 [1845]); and Bonger (1969 [1916]) among others, such critical theorists suggest that the conditions in which crime emerges are caused by the appropriation of the benefits others' labor through the generation of what is known as surplus value, concentrating in the hands of the few owners of the means of production, disproportionate wealth and power.

There are two main strands of critical criminological theory following from Marx, divided by differing conceptions of the role of the state in maintenance of capitalist inequalities. On the one hand instrumental Marxists hold that the state is manipulated by the ruling classes to act in their interests. On the other, structuralist Marxists believe that the state plays a more dominant, semi-autonomous role in subjugating those in the (relatively) powerless classes (Sheley 1985; Lynch & Groves 1986). Instrumental Marxists such as Quinney (1975), Chambliss (1975), or Krisberg (1975) are of the belief that capitalist societies are monolithic edifices of inequality, utterly dominated by powerful economic interests. Power and wealth are divided inequitably between the owners of the means of production and those who have only their labor to sell. The wealthy use the state's coercive powers to criminalize those who threaten to undermine that economic order and their position in it. Structural Marxist theory (Spitzer 1975; Greenberg 1993 [1981];) on the other hand holds that capitalist societies exhibit a dual power structure in which the state is more autonomous. Through its mediating effect it ameliorates the worst aspects of capitalist inequalities, however, it works to preserve the overall capitalist system of wealth appropriation, criminalizing those who threaten the operation of the system as a whole. As such this means that the state can criminalize not only those powerless who protest the system's injustices but also those excessive capitalists whose conduct threatens to expose the veneer of the legitimacy of capitalist endeavor.

Whereas Marxists have conventionally believed in the replacement of capitalism with socialism in a process that will eventually lead to communism, anarchists are of the view that any hierarchical system is inevitably flawed. Such theorists (Pepinsky 1978; Tift & Sulivan 1980; Ferrell 1994 inter alia) espouse an agenda of defiance of existing hierarchies, encouraging the establishment of systems of decentralised, negotiated community justice in which all members of the local community participate. Recent anarchist theorists like Ferrell attempt to locate crime as resistance both to its social construction through symbolic systems of normative censure and to its more structural constructions as threat to the state and to capitalist production.

In a move diametrically opposed to that of anarchist theorists, Left Realists wish to distance themselves from any conception of the criminal as heroic social warrior. Instead they are keen to privilege the experience of the victim and the real effects of criminal behaviour. In texts such as Young 1979 & 1986, Young and Matthews 1991, Lea and Young 1984 or Lowman & MacLean 1992, the victim, the state, the public, and the offender are all considered as a nexus of parameters within which talk about the nature of specific criminal acts may be located. Whilst left realists tend to accept that crime is a socially and historically contingent category that is defined by those with the power to do so, they are at pains to emphasise the real harms that crime does to victims who are frequently no less disadvantaged than the offenders.

All of the above conflict perspectives see individuals as being inequitably constrained by powerful and largely immutable structures, although they to varying degrees accord to humans a degree of agency. Ultimately, however, the relatively powerless are seen as being repressed by societal structures of governance or economics. Even left realists who have been criticised for being 'conservative' (not least by Cohen 1990), see the victim and the offender as being subject to systems of injustice and deprivation from which victimising behaviour emerges.

It is important to keep in mind that conflict theory while derived from Marxism, is distinct from it. Marxism is an ideology, accordingly it is not empirically tested. Conversely, conflict theory is empirically falsifiable and thus, distinct from Marxism.

== Criticism ==
Conflict Criminologies have come under sustained attack from several quarters, not least from those – left realists – who claim to be within the ranks. Early criminologies, pejoratively referred to as 'left idealist' by Jock Young 1979, were never really popular in the United States, where critical criminology departments at some universities were closed for political reasons (Rock 1997). These early criminologies were called into question by the introduction of mass self-report victim surveys (Hough & Mayhew 1983) that showed that victimisation was intra-class rather than inter-class. Thus notions that crimes like robbery were somehow primitive forms of wealth redistribution were shown to be false. Further attacks emanated from feminists who maintained that the victimisation of women was no mean business and that left idealists' concentration on the crimes of the working classes that could be seen as politically motivated ignored crimes such as rape, domestic violence, or child abuse (Smart 1977). Furthermore, it was claimed, left idealists neglected the comparative aspect of the study of crime, in that they ignored the significant quantities of crime in socialist societies, and ignored the low crime levels in capitalist societies like Switzerland and Japan (Incardi 1980).

== Feminist theories ==
Feminist criminology brings to light the gendered aspect of mainstream criminology. They reflect on the ways that women have been an invisible demographic in criminological research. Gillian Balfour and Elizabeth Comack critique the limited amount of research done on criminalized women and the ways in which the research conceptualizes women as 'other' than men. Theorists argue that because of this gap, explanatory models that have been developed to explain crime have low generalizability. They are also engaged in a project to bring to criminological theory insights to be gained from an understanding of taking a particular standpoint, that is, the use of knowledge gained through methods designed to reveal the experience of the real lives of women.

A second aspect of feminist critique centers upon the notion that even where women have become criminologists, they have adopted 'malestream' modes of research and understanding, that is they have joined and been assimilated into the modes of working of the masculine paradigm, rendering it simultaneously gender blind and biased (Menzies & Chunn 1991). However, as Menzies and Chunn argue, it is not adequate merely to 'insert' women into 'malestream' criminology, it is necessary to develop a criminology from the standpoint of women. At first glance this may appear to be gender biased against the needs and views of men. However, this claim is based on a position developed by Nancy Hartsock known as standpoint feminism. Based on the work of Marx, Hartsock suggests that the view of the world from womanhood is a 'truer' vision than that from the viewpoint of man. According to Marx (Marx 1964, Lucacs 1971) privilege blinds people to the realities of the world meaning that the powerless have a clearer view of the world – the poor see the wealth of the rich and their own poverty, whilst the rich are inured, shielded from, or in denial about the sufferings of the poor. Hartsock (1983 & 1999) argues that women are in precisely the same position as Marx's poor. From their position of powerlessness they are more capable of revealing the truth about the world than any 'malestream' paradigm ever can. Thus there are two key strands in feminist criminological thought; that criminology can be made gender aware and thus gender neutral; or that that criminology must be gender positive and adopt standpoint feminism.

Cutting across these two distinctions, feminists can be placed largely into four main groupings: liberal, radical, Marxist, and socialist (Jaggar 1983). Liberal feminists are concerned with discrimination on the grounds of gender and its prevalence in society and seek to end such discrimination. Such ends are sought through engagement with existing structures such as governments and legal frameworks, rather than by challenging modes of gender construction or hegemonic patriarchy (Hoffman Bustamante 1973, Adler 1975, Simon 1975, Edwards 1990). Thus liberal feminists are more or less content to work within the system to change it from within using its existing structures.

Critical feminists – radical feminists, Marxists, and socialists – are keen to stress the need to dispense with masculine systems and structures. Radical feminists see the roots of female oppression in patriarchy, perceiving its perpetrators as primarily aggressive in both private and public spheres, violently dominating women by control of their sexuality through pornography, rape (Brownmiller 1975), and other forms of sexual violence, thus imposing upon them masculine definitions of womanhood and women's roles, particularly in the family. Marxist feminists, (Rafter & Natalizia 1981, MacKinnon 1982 & 1983) however, hold that such patriarchal structures are emergent from the class producing inequalities inherent in capitalist means of production. The production of surplus value requires that the man who works in the capitalist's factory, pit, or office, requires a secondary, unpaid worker – the woman – to keep him fit for his labours, by providing the benefits of a home – food, keeping house, raising his children, and other comforts of family. Thus, merely in order to be fit to sell his labour, the proletarian man needs to 'keep' a support worker with the already meagre proceeds of his labour. Hence women are left with virtually no economic resources and are thus seen to exist within an economic trap that is an inevitable outcome of capitalist production. Socialist feminists attempt to steer a path between the radical and the Marxist views, identifying capitalist patriarchy as the source of women's oppression (Danner 1991). Such theorists (Eisenstein 1979, Hartmann 1979 & 1981, Messerschmidt 1986, Currie 1989) accept that a patriarchal society constrains women's roles and their view of themselves but that this patriarchy is the result not of male aggression but of the mode of capitalist production. Thus neither capitalist production nor patriarchy is privileged in the production of women's oppression, powerlessness, and economic marginalization. Socialist feminists believe that gender based oppression can only be overcome by creating a non-patriarchal, non-capitalist society, and that attempting merely to modify the status quo from within perpetuates the very system that generates inequalities.

Of significant importance in understanding the positions of most of the feminists above is that gender is taken to be a social construct. That is, the differences between men and women are not by and large biological (essentialism) but are insociated from an early age and are defined by existing patriarchal categories of womanhood. In the face of this pacifying or passive image of women, feminist criminologists wish to generate a discursive and real (extended) space within which expressions of women's own views of their identity and womanhood may emerge.

There are many forms of criticism leveled at feminist criminology, some 'facile' (Gelsthorpe 1997) such as those of Bottomley & Pease (1986), or Walker (1987) who suggest that feminist thinking is irrelevant to criminology. A major strand of criticism is leveled at what it is argued is its ethnocentrism (Rice 1990, Mama 1989, Ahluwalia 1991), that is, that in its silence on the experience of black women it is as biased as male criminology in its ignorance of the experience of women. Criminology, claim these writers, is sexist and racist and that both errors need to be corrected. A significant number of criticisms are leveled at feminist criminology by Pat Carlen in an important paper from 1992 (Carlen 1992). Among Carlen's criticisms is that of an apparent inability of feminist criminology to reconcile theoretical insight with political reality, exhibiting a "theoreticist, libertarian, separatist and gender-centric tendenc[y]". She suggests that this libertarianism reflects itself in a belief that crime reduction policies can be achieved without some form of 'social engineering'. Further criticizing feminism's libertarian streak, Carlen suggests that feminists injunction to allow women to speak for themselves reveals a separatist tendency, arguing that what feminists call for is merely good social science and should be extended to let all classes of humans speak for themselves. This separatism, claims Carlen, further manifests itself in a refusal to accept developments in mainstream criminology branding them 'malestream' or in other pejorative terms. Perhaps the most damning criticism of feminism and of certain stripes of radical feminism in particular is that, in some aspects of western societies, it has itself become the dominant interest group with powers to criminalize masculinity (see Nathanson & Young 2001).

== Postmodern theories ==
In criminology, the postmodernist school applies postmodernism to the study of crime and criminals, and understands "criminality" as a product of the power to limit the behaviour of those individuals excluded from power, but who try to overcome social inequality and behave in ways which the power structure prohibits. It focuses on the identity of the human subject, multiculturalism, feminism, and human relationships to deal with the concepts of "difference" and "otherness" without essentialism or reductionism, but its contributions are not always appreciated (Carrington: 1998). Postmodernists shift attention from Marxist concerns of economic and social oppression to linguistic production, arguing that criminal law is a language to create dominance relationships. For example, the language of courts (the so-called "legalese") expresses and institutionalises the domination of the individual, whether accused or accuser, criminal or victim, by social institutions. According to postmodernist criminology, the discourse of criminal law is dominant, exclusive and rejecting, less diverse, and culturally not pluralistic, exaggerating narrowly defined rules for the exclusion of others.
