= Left realism =

School of thought in criminology

Left realism emerged in criminology from critical criminology as a reaction against what was perceived to be the left's failure to take a practical interest in everyday crime, allowing right realism to monopolize the political agenda on law and order. Left realism argues that crime disproportionately affects working-class people, but that solutions that only increase repression serve to make the crime problem worse. Instead they argue that the root causes of crime lie in relative deprivation, and that although preventive measures and policing are necessary, they should be placed under democratic control.

== Overview ==
Pat Carlen (1992) suggests that the main tenets of left realism are theoretical and political:

Theoretical

1. 'The basic triangle of relations which is the proper subject-matter of criminology [is] - the offender, the state and the victim' (Young, 1986) (since altered to include society at large, see The Square of Crime)
2. Theoretical explanations must be symmetrical - there must be the same explanation for social action and reaction.
3. 'Man is a creator of human nature' (Young, 1987), and therefore explanations of crime should not be deterministic and people should be seen as being responsible for their actions.

Political

1. Crime is a real problem and especially to working-class people who suffer disproportionately from personal crime, such as robbery, assault, burglary and rape.
2. The 'left' should attempt to develop a credible (populist?) approach to crime control in order to prevent the 'right' from having a monopoly of the 'crime problem'.
3. The purpose of theorizing should be to make practical interventions into law and order issues.
4. In order to reduce crime there is a need to achieve a higher level of cooperation between police and public, and this will be best achieved by a democratization of local control of the police."

== Break with left idealism ==
Left realism emerged from critical criminology taking issue with "the two major socialist currents in criminology since the war: reformism and left idealism", criticising 'the moral panics of the mass media or the blatant denial of left idealism'

=== Critique of establishment criminology ===
Writing years later, Jock Young summed up critical criminology's criticism of establishment criminology by saying

The essential flaw of establishment criminology is, of course, the attempt to explain crime without touching upon reality, constantly to distance explanation from basic social and economic problems of a divided society.

=== Establishment of left realism ===
Left Realism set down a marker in the United Kingdom with the work of Lea and Young (1984) as representative of a group of academics: Richard Kinsey, John Lea, Roger Matthews, Geoff Pearson, and Jock Young. The group saw themselves as facing up to the challenge thrown down by Ian Taylor in Law and Order: Arguments for Socialism for the left to take crime seriously.

In What is to be Done About Law and Order? (1984), Young and Lea set out three main policies of left realism:

Demarginalisation

"Realists would argue for alternatives to prison", they would advocate "measures such as community service orders, victim restitution schemes, and widespread release from prison" which would stop "the severance of the moral bond with the community. The institutions that are involved in controlling crime and criminals must epitomise justice"

Pre-emptive deterrence

"Environmental and public precautions against crime are always dismissed by left idealists and reformers as not relating to the heart of the matter. Environmental and public precautions against crime distract us from the real concerns... On the contrary, the organisation of communities in an attempt to pre-empt crime is of the utmost importance"

Minimal use of prison

"Prisons should only be used in those circumstances where there is extreme danger to the community... Life inside should be as free and as 'normal' as possible. Such a demand is not humanitarian idealism - it is based on the simple fact that the result of prison experience is to produce pitiful inadequates or hardened criminals"

Left realism however, did not isolate itself completely from Critical Criminology. John Lea, for example, took issue with Stan Cohen's characterisation of retreating from previous theoretical gains.

== Theoretical contributions ==
=== Crime statistics and local victimization surveys ===
According to Young, "For Left Realism, the social survey is a democratic instrument: it gives a picture of consumer demand and satisfaction."

Left realists argue that the national victimization research, such as the British Crime Survey, can be used to give an average risk rate that ignores the variations in crime between areas. Such studies can be used to view people's fear of crime as 'irrational'. According to Young, "The (local) victimization survey accurately provides a map of the problems of an area. Although based on public input, it delivers what any individual member of the public is ignorant of: that is how private problems are publicly distributed."

Further more "at certain parts of the social structure, we have a compounding of social problems. If we were to draw up a map of the city outlining areas of high infant mortality, bad housing, unemployment, poor nutrition, etc., we would find that these maps would coincide and that further, the outline traced would correspond to those areas of high criminal victimization... Further, this compounding of social problems occurs against those who are more or less vulnerable because of their position in the social structure. That is, people who have the least power socially suffer most from crime."

Left realists conducted local victimisation surveys in Islington, Hammersmith and Fulham, Broadwater Farm and Merseyside.

=== Square of crime ===
One of left realism's most substantial contributions to criminology is the square of crime. Expanding on "The basic triangle of relations which is the proper subject-matter of criminology [is] - the offender, the state and the victim" (Young, 1986), Young proceeded to add the public (civil society) to this to create the four corners of a square, with the offender and victim at one side (the actors) and the state and civil society at the other (the reactors).

According to Young, "Any changes in one of these factors will affect the crime rate... The point here is that crime cannot be simply explained in terms of crime control agencies, and that the agencies involved in crime control are much wider than in the criminal justice system."

Young continues, "The police-public relationship is central the interaction between all the parts is also important. For example, the police and agency response to victims greatly affects the actual impact of victimisation and in certain instances, such as rape and sexual assault, can even involve what has been termed 'secondary victimisation'. That is where the victim herself becomes further stigmatised by police and courts. All of this, particularly in terms of willingness (and wariness) to report to the police, affects the official crime rate and the possibilities of clear-up."

=== Relative deprivation ===
Young (1994) argues that there is an aetiological crisis, i.e. there is a lack of explanation for the fact that reported crime rises during both economic good times and bad times. Aetiology assumes fundamental importance. If the cause of crime is injustice, then its solution must lie in this direction. If poor conditions cause crime, it must be impossible to prevent crime without changing these circumstances. Furthermore, it follows that it must be wrong to punish the offender for conditions beyond his or her control. This would be punishing the criminal and blaming the victim. The social democratic brand of positivism, although sensing that injustice was the root cause of crime, either deflected its attentions to purely individual deprivation (e.g. maternal deprivation, broken homes, etc.) or made the fundamental mistake of believing that ameliorating deprivation quantitatively in an absolute sense (e.g. raising standards of education, housing, etc.) would solve the problem of relative deprivation. Young distinguishes the structural approach of other Left-wing theorists, and posits that most crime is minor, amateurish, sporadic, and intra-class, i.e. committed by working class offenders on working class victims. He rejects the positivist view that unemployment or poverty causes crime, but prefers Merton's theory of anomie and Subcultural Theory which focus on the lack of opportunity to achieve social status and economic expectations: a lack most commonly felt by the most disadvantaged sections of the community. He believes that the majority of criminals hold conventional social values, reflecting the need to achieve material success or social status in a competitive society where sexism, racism, machismo and other ideological forms affect outcomes. Indeed, criminal behaviour could be characterised as the operation of capitalist principles, i.e. the investment of labour for a return, but in an illegitimate form.

For left realism, "Discontent is a product of relative, not absolute, deprivation... Sheer poverty, for example, does not necessarily lead to a subculture of discontent; it may, just as easily, lead to quiescence and fatalism. Discontent occurs when comparisons between comparable groups are made which suggest that unnecessary injustices are occurring... Exploitative cultures have existed for generations without extinction: it is the perception of injustice - relative deprivation - which counts."

Young argues that relative deprivation is the most probable cause of criminality because people whose progress towards fulfilling expectations has stalled grow more aware of the injustice and unfairness in a society that allows inequality to arise, and this in turn breeds political disenchantment. At a societal level, this disenchantment may lead to rioting. At an individual level, theft and burglary may seem an appropriate means to redress the balance. This may be seen as an appropriate means of furthering the "just cause" to throw off oppression. Realists tend to not see crime as some form of revolutionary challenge to the ruling class. Rather, they say, crime is a reactionary form of behaviour which demonstrates the absence of real political solutions to the experience of degradation and exploitation suffered by the working class, thus making individual crime devoid of political agenda. The majority fear crime regardless of social class and wish to find ways of eliminating it so as to create a secure environment. This creates a "problem of order" for a government which has the political responsibility to maintain an orderly society, and is accountable to an electorate likely to find disorder and chaos high on their political agenda.

== After the 1997 Labour Party victory ==
Criminologists such as Roger Hopkins Burke see left realism as 'very influential with the 'New' Labour Government elected in 1997' suggesting that acts such as the 1998 Crime and Disorder Act which combined measures that ensured offenders had to take responsibility for their actions and policies to tackle social and economic exclusion. However, whilst noting that social exclusion was "...a key term in the policies of New Labour", Jock Young commented that they used the 'weak thesis' of social exclusion where such exclusion is self-imposed by a lazy and idle underclass, a value shared with the previous Conservative administration.

== Key articles ==
- Kinsey, Richard; Lea, John & Young, Jock. (1986). Losing the Fight Against Crime. London: Blackwell. ISBN 0-631-13721-1
- Lea, John. (1987). Left Realism: A Defence. Contemporary Crises.
- Lea, John & Young, Jock. (1984). What Is To Be Done About Law and Order — Crisis in the Eighties. Harmondsworth: Penguin. (Pluto Press revised edition: 1993). ISBN 0-7453-0735-3
- Matthews, Roger & Young, Jock. (2003). The New Politics of Crime and Punishment. Willan Publishing. ISBN 1-903240-91-3
- Matthews, Roger & Young, Jock. (eds.). (1992) Rethinking Criminology: The Realist Debate. (Sage Contemporary Criminology). London: Sage. ISBN 0-8039-8621-1
- Matthews, Roger & Young, Jock (eds.). (1992) Issues in Realist Criminology. Sage Contemporary Criminology Series. London: Sage. ISBN 0-8039-8624-6
- Taylor, Ian. (1982). Law and Order: Arguments for Socialism.
- Young, Jock. (ed.). (1994). The Exclusive Society: Social Exclusion, Crime and Difference in Late Modernity. London: Thousand Oaks: Sage Publications. ISBN 0-8039-8151-1
- Young, Jock. (2007). The Vertigo of Late Modernity. London: SAGE Publications Ltd. ISBN 978-1412935746
