= Rapping =

Type of musical delivery involving rhythmic speech

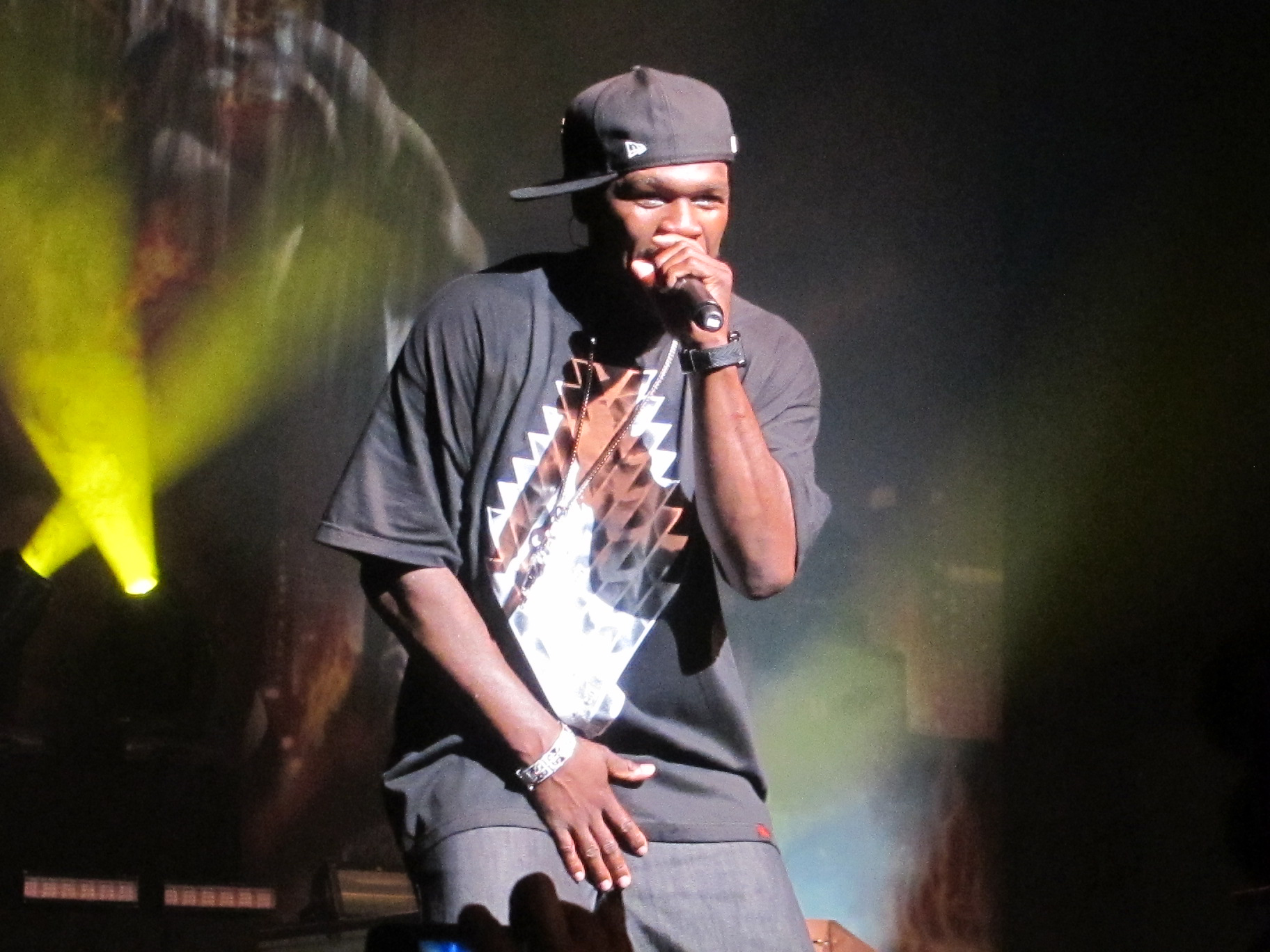
American rapper 50 Cent (Curtis Jackson) performing at Warfield Theatre, San Francisco, June 3, 2010

Rapping (also dropping, rhyming, flowing, spitting, emceeing, or MCing) is an artistic form of vocal delivery and emotive expression that incorporates "rhyme, rhythmic speech, and [commonly] street vernacular". It is usually performed over a backing beat or musical accompaniment. The components of rap include "content" (what is being said, e.g., lyrics), "flow" (rhythm, rhyme), and "delivery" (cadence, tone). Rap differs from spoken-word poetry in that it is usually performed off-time to musical accompaniment. It also differs from singing, which varies in pitch and does not always include words. Because they do not rely on pitch inflection, some rap artists may play with timbre or other vocal qualities. Rap is a primary ingredient of hip-hop music, and so commonly associated with the genre that it is sometimes called "rap music".

Precursors to modern rap music include the West African griot tradition, certain vocal styles of blues and jazz, an African-American insult game called playing the dozens (see Battle rap and Diss), and 1960s African-American poetry. Stemming from the hip-hop cultural movement, rap music originated in the Bronx, New York City, in the early 1970s and became part of popular music later that decade. Rapping developed from the announcements made over the microphone at parties by DJs and MCs, evolving into more complex lyrical performances.

Rap is usually delivered over a beat, typically provided by a DJ, turntablist, or beatboxer when performing live. Much less commonly a rapper can decide to perform a cappella. When a rap or hip-hop artist is creating a song, "track", or record, done primarily in a production studio, most frequently a producer provides the beat(s) for the MC to flow over. Stylistically, rap occupies a gray area between speech, prose, poetry, and singing. The word, which predates the musical form, originally meant "to lightly strike", and is now used to describe quick speech or repartee. The word has been used in the English language since the 16th century. In the 1960s the word became a slang term meaning "to converse" in African American vernacular, and very soon after that came to denote the musical style.

Rap music has played a significant role in expressing social and political issues, addressing topics such as racism, poverty, and political oppression. By the 21st century, rap had become a global phenomenon, influencing music, fashion, and culture worldwide.

== History ==
=== Etymology and usage ===
The English verb rap has various meanings; these include "to strike, especially with a quick, smart, or light blow", as well "to utter sharply or vigorously: to rap out a command". The Shorter Oxford English Dictionary gives a date of 1541 for the first recorded use of the word with the meaning "to utter (esp. an oath) sharply, vigorously, or suddenly". Wentworth and Flexner's Dictionary of American Slang gives the meaning "to speak to, recognize, or acknowledge acquaintance with someone", dated 1932, and a later meaning of "to converse, esp. in an open and frank manner". It is these meanings from which the musical form of rapping derives, and this definition may be from a shortening of repartee. A rapper refers to a performer who "raps". By the late 1960s, when Hubert G. Brown changed his name to H. Rap Brown, rap was a slang term referring to an oration or speech, such as was common among the "hip" crowd in the protest movements, but it did not come to be associated with a musical style for another decade.

Rap was used to describe talking on records as early as 1970 on Isaac Hayes' album ...To Be Continued with the track name "Monologue: Ike's Rap I". Hayes' "husky-voiced sexy spoken 'raps' became key components in his signature sound". Del the Funky Homosapien similarly states that rap was used to refer to talking in a stylistic manner in the early 1970s: "I was born in '72 ... back then what rapping meant, basically, was you trying to convey something—you're trying to convince somebody. That's what rapping is, it's in the way you talk."

It is sometimes claimed that "rap" is an acronym for 'Rhythm And Poetry', but this does not reflect the history of the word and thus is best seen as a backronym.

=== Roots and origin ===
Similarities to rapping can be observed in West African chanting folk traditions. Centuries before hip-hop music existed, the griots of West Africans were delivering stories rhythmically, over drums and sparse instrumentation. Such resemblances have been noted by many modern artists, modern day "griots", spoken word artists, mainstream news sources, and academics. Rap lyrics and music are part of the "Black rhetorical continuum", continuing past traditions of expanding upon them through "creative use of language and rhetorical styles and strategies".

Gotta Let You Go
Joe Hill Louis's song "Gotta Let You Go" is an early example of rapping in blues.

Blues, rooted in the work songs and spirituals of slavery, was first played by black Americans around the time of the Emancipation Proclamation. This way of preaching, unique to African-Americans, called the Black sermonic tradition influenced singers and musicians such as 1940s African-American gospel group The Jubalaires. The Jubalaire's songs "The Preacher and the Bear" (1941) and "Noah" (1946) are precursors to the genre of rap music. The Jubalaires and other African-American singing groups during the blues, jazz, and gospel era are examples of the origins and development of rap music. Grammy-winning blues musician/historian Elijah Wald and others have argued that the blues were being rapped as early as the 1920s. Wald went so far as to call hip-hop "the living blues". A notable recorded example of rapping in blues was the 1950 song "Gotta Let You Go" by Joe Hill Louis.

Jazz, which developed from the blues and other African-American and European musical traditions and originated around the beginning of the 20th century, has also influenced hip-hop and has been cited as a precursor of hip-hop. Not just jazz music and lyrics but also jazz poetry. According to John Sobol, the jazz musician and poet who wrote Digitopia Blues, rap "bears a striking resemblance to the evolution of jazz both stylistically and formally". Boxer Muhammad Ali anticipated elements of rap, often using rhyme schemes and spoken word poetry, both for when he was trash talking in boxing and as political poetry for his activism outside of boxing, paving the way for The Last Poets in 1968, Gil Scott-Heron in 1970, and the emergence of rap music in the 1970s. An editor of the newspaper, The Fayetteville Observer interviewed Bill Curtis of the disco-funk music group the Fatback Band in 2020. Curtis noted that when he moved to the Bronx in the 1970s he heard people rapping over scratched records throughout the neighborhoods and radio DJs were rapping before the genre was released on retail recordings. The Fatback Band released the first rap recording, "King Tim III (Personality Jock)", a few weeks before the Sugarhill Gang in 1979. In another interview Curtis said: "There was rapping in the Bronx and the cats there had been doing it for a while...Fatback certainly didn't invent rap or anything. I was just interested in it and I guess years later we were the first to record it. At the time you could already see cats rapping everywhere in the streets and doing stuff."

With the decline of disco in the early 1980s rap became a new form of expression. Rap arose from musical experimentation with rhyming, rhythmic speech. Rap was a departure from disco. Sherley Anne Williams refers to the development of rap as "anti-Disco" in style and means of reproduction. The early productions of Rap after Disco sought a more simplified manner of producing the tracks they were to sing over. Williams explains how Rap composers and DJ's opposed the heavily orchestrated and ritzy multi-tracks of Disco for "break beats" which were created from compiling different records from numerous genres and did not require the equipment from professional recording studios. Professional studios were not necessary therefore opening the production of rap to the youth who as Williams explains felt "locked out" because of the capital needed to produce Disco records.

More directly related to the African-American community were items like schoolyard chants and taunts, clapping games, jump-rope rhymes, some with unwritten folk histories going back hundreds of years across many nationalities. Sometimes these items contain racially offensive lyrics.

=== Proto-rap ===
In his narration between the tracks on George Russell's 1958 jazz album New York, N.Y., the singer Jon Hendricks recorded something close to modern rap, since it all rhymed and was delivered in a hip, rhythm-conscious manner. Art forms such as spoken word jazz poetry and comedy records had an influence on the first rappers. Coke La Rock, often credited as hip-hop's first MC cites the Last Poets among his influences, as well as comedians such as Wild Man Steve and Richard Pryor. Comedian Rudy Ray Moore released under the counter albums in the 1960s and 1970s such as This Pussy Belongs to Me (1970), which contained "raunchy, sexually explicit rhymes that often had to do with pimps, prostitutes, players, and hustlers", and which later led to him being called "The Godfather of Rap".

Gil Scott-Heron, a jazz poet/musician, has been cited as an influence on rappers such as Chuck D and KRS-One. Scott-Heron himself was influenced by Melvin Van Peebles, whose first album was 1968's Brer Soul. Van Peebles describes his vocal style as "the old Southern style", which was influenced by singers he had heard growing up in South Chicago. Van Peebles also said that he was influenced by older forms of African-American music: "... people like Blind Lemon Jefferson and the field hollers. I was also influenced by spoken word song styles from Germany that I encountered when I lived in France."

During the mid-20th century, the musical culture of the Caribbean was constantly influenced by the concurrent changes in American music. As early as 1956, deejays were toasting over dubbed Jamaican beats. It was called "rap", expanding the word's earlier meaning in the African-American community—"to discuss or debate informally."

The early rapping of hip-hop developed out of DJ and master of ceremonies' announcements made over the microphone at parties, and later into more complex raps. Grandmaster Caz stated: "The microphone was just used for making announcements, like when the next party was gonna be, or people's moms would come to the party looking for them, and you have to announce it on the mic. Different DJs started embellishing what they were saying. I would make an announcement this way, and somebody would hear that and they add a little bit to it. I'd hear it again and take it a little step further 'til it turned from lines to sentences to paragraphs to verses to rhymes."

One of the first rappers at the beginning of the hip-hop period, at the end of the 1970s, was also hip-hop's first DJ, DJ Kool Herc. Herc, a Jamaican immigrant, started delivering simple raps at his parties, which some claim were inspired by the Jamaican tradition of toasting. However, Kool Herc himself denies this link (in the 1984 book Hip Hop), saying, "Jamaican toasting? Naw, naw. No connection there. I couldn't play reggae in the Bronx. People wouldn't accept it. The inspiration for rap is James Brown and the album Hustler's Convention". Herc also suggests he was too young while in Jamaica to get into sound system parties: "I couldn't get in. Couldn't get in. I was ten, eleven years old," and that while in Jamaica, he was listening to James Brown: "I was listening to American music in Jamaica and my favorite artist was James Brown. That's who inspired me. A lot of the records I played were by James Brown."

However, in terms of what was identified in the 2010s as "rap", the source came from Manhattan. Pete DJ Jones said the first person he heard rap was DJ Hollywood, a Harlem (not Bronx) native who was the house DJ at the Apollo Theater. Kurtis Blow also said the first person he heard rhyme was DJ Hollywood. In a 2014 interview, Hollywood said: "I used to like the way Frankie Crocker would ride a track, but he wasn't syncopated to the track though. I liked [WWRL DJ] Hank Spann too, but he wasn't on the one. Guys back then weren't concerned with being musical. I wanted to flow with the record". And in 1975, he ushered in what became known as the "hip hop" style by rhyming syncopated to the beat of an existing record uninterruptedly for nearly a minute. He adapted the lyrics of Isaac Hayes' "Good Love 6-9969" and rhymed it to the breakdown part of "Love Is the Message". His partner Kevin Smith, better known as Lovebug Starski, took this new style and introduced it to the Bronx hip-hop set that until then was composed of DJing and b-boying (or beatboxing), with traditional "shout out" style rapping.

The style that Hollywood created and his partner introduced to the hip-hop set quickly became the standard. Before that time, most MC rhymes, based on radio DJs, consisted of short patters that were disconnected thematically; they were separate unto themselves. But by using song lyrics, Hollywood gave his rhyme an inherent flow and theme. This was quickly noticed, and the style spread. By the end of the 1970s, artists such as Kurtis Blow and the Sugarhill Gang were starting to receive radio airplay and make an impact far outside of New York City, on a national scale. Blondie's 1981 single, "Rapture", was the first number-one single on the United States Billboard Hot 100 chart to feature rap vocals.

=== Old-school hip-hop ===
Old school rap (1979–84) was "easily identified by its relatively simple raps" according to AllMusic, "the emphasis was not on lyrical technique, but simply on good times", one notable exception being Melle Mel, who set the way for future rappers through his socio-political content and creative wordplay.

=== Golden age ===
Golden age hip-hop (the mid-1980s to early '90s) was the time period where hip-hop lyricism went through its most drastic transformation – writer William Jelani Cobb says "in these golden years, a critical mass of mic prodigies were literally creating themselves and their art form at the same time" and Allmusic writes, "rhymers like PE's Chuck D, Big Daddy Kane, KRS-One, and Rakim basically invented the complex wordplay and lyrical kung-fu of later hip-hop". The golden age is considered to have ended around 1993–94, marking the end of rap lyricism's most innovative period.

== Flow ==
"Flow" is defined as "the rhythms and rhymes" of a hip-hop song's lyrics and how they interact – the book How to Rap breaks flow down into rhyme, rhyme schemes, and rhythm (also known as cadence). 'Flow' is also sometimes used to refer to elements of the delivery (pitch, timbre, volume) as well, though often a distinction is made between the flow and the delivery.

Staying on the beat is central to rap's flow – many MCs note the importance of staying on-beat in How to Rap including Sean Price, Mighty Casey, Zion I, Vinnie Paz, Fredro Starr, Del the Funky Homosapien, Tech N9ne, People Under the Stairs, Twista, B-Real, Mr Lif, 2Mex, and Cage.

MCs stay on beat by stressing syllables in time to the four beats of the musical backdrop. Poetry scholar Derek Attridge describes how this works in his book Poetic Rhythm – "rap lyrics are written to be performed to an accompaniment that emphasizes the metrical structure of the verse". He says rap lyrics are made up of "lines with four stressed beats, separated by other syllables that may vary in number and may include other stressed syllables. The strong beat of the accompaniment coincides with the stressed beats of the verse, and the rapper organizes the rhythms of the intervening syllables to provide variety and surprise".

The same technique is also noted in the book How to Rap, where diagrams are used to show how the lyrics line up with the beat – "stressing a syllable on each of the four beats gives the lyrics the same underlying rhythmic pulse as the music and keeps them in rhythm ... other syllables in the song may still be stressed, but the ones that fall in time with the four beats of a bar are the only ones that need to be emphasized in order to keep the lyrics in time with the music".

In rap terminology, 16 bars is the amount of time that rappers are generally given to perform a guest verse on another artist's song; one bar is typically equal to four beats of music.

=== History ===
Old school flows were relatively basic and used only few syllables per bar, simple rhythmic patterns, and basic rhyming techniques and rhyme schemes. Melle Mel is cited as an MC who epitomizes the old school flow – Kool Moe Dee says, "from 1970 to 1978 we rhymed one way [then] Melle Mel, in 1978, gave us the new cadence we would use from 1978 to 1986". "He's the first emcee to explode in a new rhyme cadence, and change the way every emcee rhymed forever. Rakim, The Notorious B.I.G., and Eminem have flipped the flow, but Melle Mel's downbeat on the two, four, kick to snare cadence is still the rhyme foundation all emcees are building on".

Artists and critics often credit Rakim with creating the overall shift from the more simplistic old school flows to more complex flows near the beginning of hip-hop's new school – Kool Moe Dee says, "any emcee that came after 1986 had to study Rakim just to know what to be able to do. Rakim, in 1986, gave us flow and that was the rhyme style from 1986 to 1994. From that point on, anybody emceeing was forced to focus on their flow". Kool Moe Dee explains that before Rakim, the term 'flow' was not widely used – "Rakim is basically the inventor of flow. We were not even using the word flow until Rakim came along. It was called rhyming, it was called cadence, but it wasn't called flow. Rakim created flow!" He adds that while Rakim upgraded and popularized the focus on flow, "he didn't invent the word".

Kool Moe Dee states that Biggie introduced a newer flow which "dominated from 1994 to 2002", and also says that Method Man was "one of the emcees from the early to mid-'90s that ushered in the era of flow ... Rakim invented it, Big Daddy Kane, KRS-One, and Kool G Rap expanded it, but Biggie and Method Man made flow the single most important aspect of an emcee's game". He also cites Craig Mack as an artist who contributed to developing flow in the '90s.

Music scholar Adam Krims says, "the flow of MCs is one of the profoundest changes that separates out new-sounding from older-sounding music ... it is widely recognized and remarked that rhythmic styles of many commercially successful MCs since roughly the beginning of the 1990s have progressively become faster and more 'complex'". He cites "members of the Wu-Tang Clan, Nas, AZ, Big Pun, and Ras Kass, just to name a few" as artists who exemplify this progression.

Kool Moe Dee adds, "in 2002 Eminem created the song that got the first Oscar in Hip-Hop history [Lose Yourself] ... and I would have to say that his flow is the most dominant right now (2003)".

=== Styles ===
There are many different styles of flow, with different terminology used by different people – stic.man of Dead Prez uses the following terms –

- "The Chant", which he says is used by Lil Jon and Project Pat
- "The Syncopated Bounce", used by Twista and Bone Thugs-n-Harmony
- "Straight Forward", used by Scarface, 2Pac, Melle Mel, KRS-One circa Boogie Down Productions era, Too Short, Jay-Z, Ice Cube, Dr. Dre, and Snoop Dogg
- "The Rubik's Cube", used by Nas, Black Thought of The Roots, Common, Kurupt, and Lauryn Hill
- "2-5-Flow", a pun of Kenya's calling code "+254", used by Camp Mulla

Alternatively, music scholar Adam Krims uses the following terms –

- "sung rhythmic style", used by Too Short, Grandmaster Flash and the Furious Five, and the Beastie Boys
- "percussion-effusive style", used by B-Real of Cypress Hill
- "speech-effusive style", used by Big Pun
- "offbeat style", used by E-40, Outkast

=== Rhyme ===
MCs use many different rhyming techniques, including complex rhyme schemes, as Adam Krims points out – "the complexity ... involves multiple rhymes in the same rhyme complex (i.e. section with consistently rhyming words), internal rhymes, [and] offbeat rhymes". There is also widespread use of multisyllabic rhymes.

It has been noted that rap's use of rhyme is some of the most advanced in all forms of poetry – music scholar Adam Bradley notes, "rap rhymes so much and with such variety that it is now the largest and richest contemporary archive of rhymed words. It has done more than any other art form in recent history to expand rhyme's formal range and expressive possibilities".

In the book How to Rap, Masta Ace explains how Rakim and Big Daddy Kane caused a shift in the way MCs rhymed: "Up until Rakim, everybody who you heard rhyme, the last word in the sentence was the rhyming [word], the connection word. Then Rakim showed us that you could put rhymes within a rhyme ... now here comes Big Daddy Kane — instead of going three words, he's going multiple". How to Rap explains that "rhyme is often thought to be the most important factor in rap writing ... rhyme is what gives rap lyrics their musicality.

=== Rhythm ===
Many of the rhythmic techniques used in rapping come from percussive techniques and many rappers compare themselves to percussionists. How to Rap 2 identifies all the rhythmic techniques used in rapping such as triplets, flams, 16th notes, 32nd notes, syncopation, extensive use of rests, and rhythmic techniques unique to rapping such as West Coast "lazy tails", coined by Shock G. Rapping has also been done in various time signatures, such as 3/4 time.

Since the 2000s, rapping has evolved into a style of rap that spills over the boundaries of the beat, closely resembling spoken English. Rappers like MF Doom and Eminem have exhibited this style, and since then, rapping has been difficult to notate. The American hip-hop group Crime Mob exhibited a new rap flow in songs such as "Knuck If You Buck", heavily dependent on triplets. Rappers including Drake, Kanye West, Rick Ross, Young Jeezy and more have included this influence in their music. In 2014, an American hip-hop collective from Atlanta, Migos, popularized this flow, and is commonly referred to as the "Migos Flow" (a term that is contentious within the hip-hop community).

=== Groove classes ===
Mitchell Ohriner in "Flow: The Rhythmic Voice in Rap Music" describes seven "groove classes" consisting of archetypal sixteen-step accent patterns generated by grouping notes in clusters of two and/or three. These groove classes are further distinguished from one another as "duple" and "nonduple". Groove classes without internal repetition can occur in any of sixteen rhythmic rotations, whereas groove classes with internal repetition have fewer meaningful rotations.

Groove class	Duple or nonduple?	Internal repetition?
2222_2222	duple	yes
332_332	nonduple	yes
332_2222	nonduple	no
323_2222	nonduple	no
333322	nonduple	no
333232	nonduple	no
3223222	nonduple	no

=== Rap notation and flow diagrams ===
The standard form of rap notation is the flow diagram, where rappers line up their lyrics underneath "beat numbers". Different rappers have slightly different forms of flow diagram that they use: Del the Funky Homosapien says, "I'm just writing out the rhythm of the flow, basically. Even if it's just slashes to represent the beats, that's enough to give me a visual path."; Vinnie Paz states, "I've created my own sort of writing technique, like little marks and asterisks to show like a pause or emphasis on words in certain places."; and Aesop Rock says, "I have a system of maybe 10 little symbols that I use on paper that tell me to do something when I'm recording."

Hip-hop scholars also make use of the same flow diagrams: the books How to Rap and How to Rap 2 use the diagrams to explain rap's triplets, flams, rests, rhyme schemes, runs of rhyme, and breaking rhyme patterns, among other techniques. Similar systems are used by PhD musicologists Adam Krims in his book Rap Music and the Poetics of Identity and Kyle Adams in his academic work on flow.

Because rap almost always revolves around a strong 4/4 beat, with certain syllables said in time to the beat, all the notational systems have a similar structure: they all have the same four beat numbers at the top of the diagram, so that syllables can be written in-line with the beat numbers. This allows devices such as rests, "lazy tails", flams, and other rhythmic techniques to be shown, as well as illustrating where different rhyming words fall in relation to the music.

== Performance ==
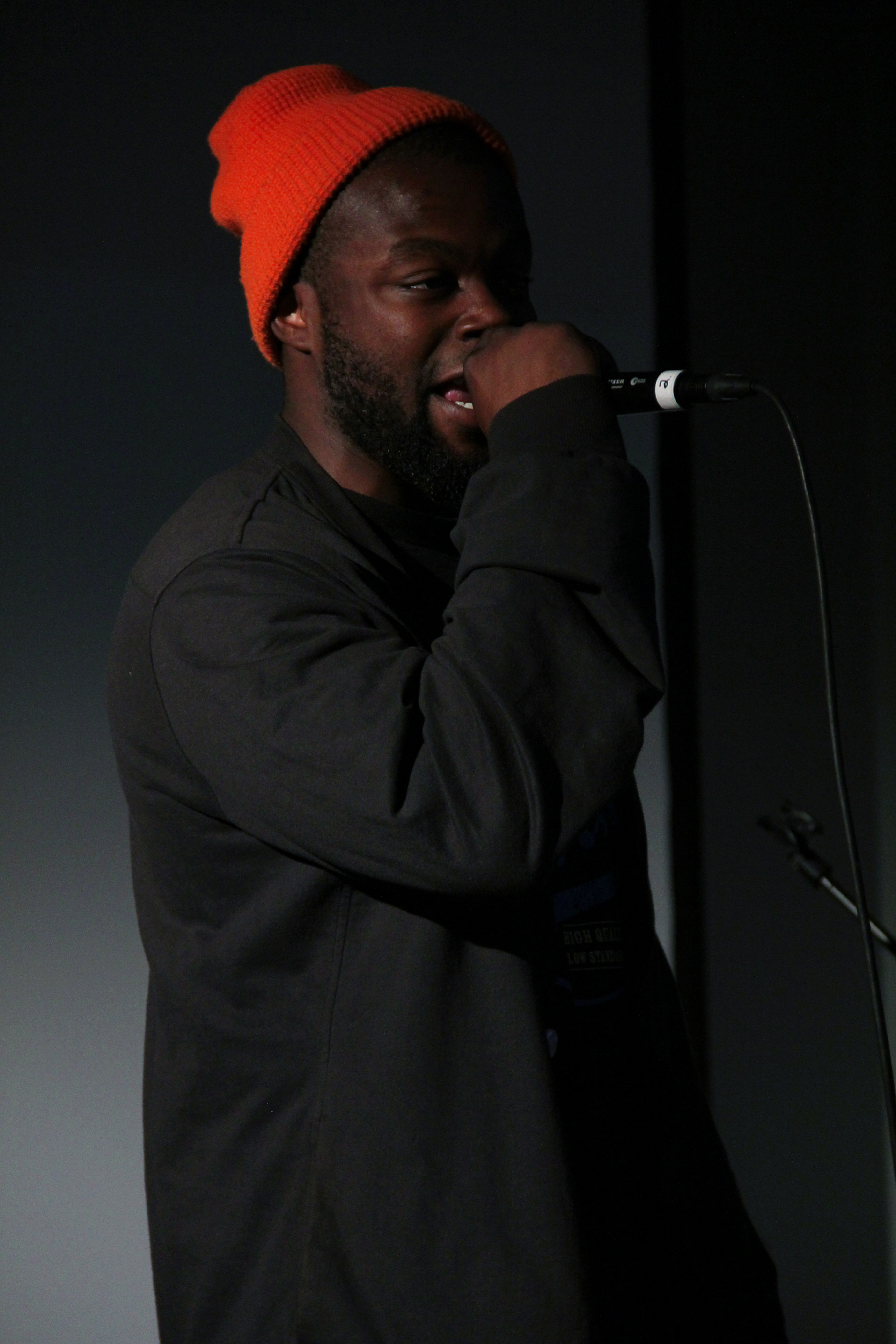
Ekow, part of The Megaphone State rap duo, performing at the Sello Library in Espoo, Finland, in 2011

To successfully deliver a rap, a rapper must also develop vocal presence, enunciation, and breath control. Vocal presence is the distinctiveness of a rapper's voice on record. Enunciation is essential to a flowing rap; some rappers choose also to exaggerate it for comic and artistic effect. Breath control, taking in air without interrupting one's delivery, is an important skill for a rapper to master, and a must for any MC. An MC with poor breath control cannot deliver difficult verses without making unintentional pauses.

Raps are sometimes delivered with melody. West Coast rapper Egyptian Lover was the first notable MC to deliver "sing-raps". Popular rappers such as 50 Cent and Ja Rule add a slight melody to their otherwise purely percussive raps whereas some rappers such as Cee-Lo Green are able to harmonize their raps with the beat. Lauryn Hill, T-Pain and Drake incorporate fully sung vocals alongside raps with both R&B and hip-hop instrumentals. The Midwestern group Bone Thugs-n-Harmony was one of the first groups to achieve nationwide recognition for using the fast-paced, melodic and harmonic raps that are also practiced by Do or Die, another Midwestern group. Another rapper that harmonized his rhymes was Nate Dogg, a rapper part of the group 213. Rakim experimented not only with following the beat, but also with complementing the song's melody with his own voice, making his flow sound like that of an instrument (a saxophone in particular).

The ability to rap quickly and clearly is sometimes regarded as an important sign of skill. In certain hip-hop subgenres such as chopped and screwed, slow-paced rapping is often considered optimal. The current record for fastest rapper is held by Spanish rapper Domingo Edjang Moreno, known by his alias Chojin, who rapped 921 syllables in one minute on December 23, 2008.

=== Emcees ===
In the late 1970s, the term emcee, MC or M.C., derived from "master of ceremonies", became an alternative title for a rapper, and for their role within hip-hop music and culture. An MC uses rhyming verses, pre-written or ad lib ('freestyled'), to introduce the DJ with whom they work, to keep the crowd entertained or to glorify themselves. As hip-hop progressed, the title MC acquired backronyms such as 'mike chanter' 'microphone controller', 'microphone checker', 'music commentator', and one who 'moves the crowd'. Some use this word interchangeably with the term rapper, while for others the term denotes a superior level of skill and connection to the wider culture.

MC can often be used as a term of distinction, referring to an artist with good performance skills. As Kool G Rap notes, "masters of ceremony, where the word 'M.C.' comes from, means just keeping the party alive" [sic]. Many people in hip-hop including DJ Premier and KRS-One feel that James Brown was the first MC. James Brown had the lyrics, moves, and soul that greatly influenced a lot of rappers in hip-hop, and arguably even started the first MC rhyme.

For some rappers, there was a distinction to the term, such as for MC Hammer who acquired the nickname "MC" for being a "Master of Ceremonies" which he used when he began performing at various clubs while on the road with the Oakland As and eventually in the military (United States Navy). It was within the lyrics of a rap song called "This Wall" that Hammer first identified himself as MC Hammer and later marketed it on his debut album Feel My Power. The term MC has also been used in the genre of grime music to refer to a rapid style of rapping. Grime artist JME released an album titled Grime MC in 2019 which peaked at 29 on the UK Albums Chart.

Uncertainty over the acronym's expansion may be considered evidence for its ubiquity: the full term "Master of Ceremonies" is very rarely used in the hip-hop scene. This confusion prompted the hip-hop group A Tribe Called Quest to include this statement in the liner notes to their 1993 album Midnight Marauders:

The use of the term MC when referring to a rhyming wordsmith originates from the dance halls of Jamaica. At each event, there would be a master of ceremonies who would introduce the different musical acts and would say a toast in style of a rhyme, directed at the audience and to the performers. He would also make announcements such as the schedule of other events or advertisements from local sponsors. The term MC continued to be used by the children of women who moved to New York City to work as maids in the 1970s. These MCs eventually created a new style of music called hip-hop based on the rhyming they used to do in Jamaica and the breakbeats used in records. MC has also recently been accepted to refer to all who engineer music.

=== Female rappers ===
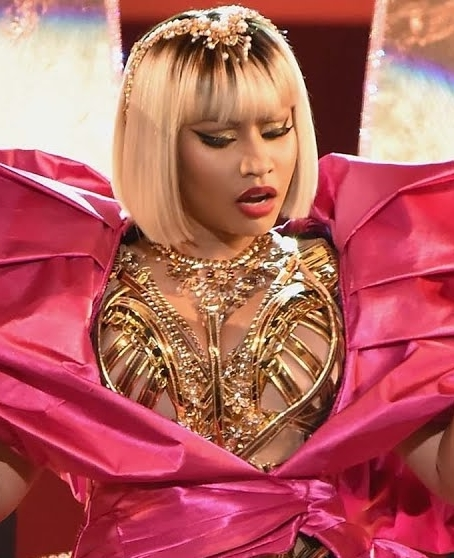
Rapper Nicki Minaj is often regarded as the "Queen of Rap".

Female rappers with mainstream success have included Lauryn Hill, Nicki Minaj, MC Lyte, Jean Grae, Foxy Brown, Lil' Kim, Missy Elliott, Queen Latifah, Da Brat, Trina, Megan Thee Stallion, Cardi B, M.I.A., CL from 2NE1, Iggy Azalea, Eve, and Lisa Lopes from TLC.

== Subject matter ==
"Party rhymes", meant to excite the crowd at a party, were nearly the exclusive focus of old school hip-hop, and they remain a staple of hip-hop music to this day. In addition to party raps, rappers also tend to make references to love and sex. Love raps were first popularized by Spoonie Gee of the Treacherous Three, and later, in the golden age of hip-hop, Big Daddy Kane, Heavy D, and LL Cool J would continue this tradition. Hip-hop artists such as KRS-One, Hopsin, Public Enemy, Lupe Fiasco, Mos Def, Talib Kweli, Jay-Z, Nas, The Notorious B.I.G. (Biggie), and dead prez are known for their sociopolitical subject matter. Their West Coast counterparts include The Coup, Paris, and Michael Franti. Tupac Shakur was also known for rapping about social issues such as police brutality, teenage pregnancy, and racism.

Other rappers take a less critical approach to urbanity, sometimes even embracing such aspects as crime. Schoolly D was the first notable MC to rap about crime. Early on KRS-One was accused of celebrating crime and a hedonistic lifestyle, but after the death of his DJ, Scott La Rock, KRS-One went on to speak out against violence in hip-hop and has spent the majority of his career condemning violence and writing on issues of race and class. Ice-T was one of the first rappers to call himself a "playa" and discuss guns on record, but his theme tune to the 1988 film Colors contained warnings against joining gangs. Gangsta rap, made popular largely because of N.W.A, brought rapping about crime and the gangster lifestyle into the musical mainstream.

Materialism has also been a popular topic in hip-hop since at least the early 1990s, with rappers boasting about their own wealth and possessions, and name-dropping specific brands: liquor brands Cristal and Rémy Martin, car manufacturers Bentley and Mercedes-Benz and clothing brands Gucci and Versace have all been popular subjects for rappers.

Various politicians, journalists, and religious leaders have accused rappers of fostering a culture of violence and hedonism among hip-hop listeners through their lyrics. However, there are also rappers whose messages may not be in line with these views, for example Christian hip-hop. Others have praised the "political critique, innuendo and sarcasm" of hip-hop music.

In contrast to the more hedonistic approach of gangsta rappers, some rappers have a spiritual or religious focus. Christian rap is currently the most commercially successful form of religious rap. With Christian rappers like Lecrae, Thi'sl and Hostyle Gospel winning national awards and making regular appearances on television, Christian hip-hop seems to have found its way in the hip-hop family. Aside from Christianity, the Five Percent Nation, an Islamic esotericist religious/spiritual group, has been represented more than any religious group in popular hip-hop. Artists such as Rakim, the members of the Wu-Tang Clan, Brand Nubian, X-Clan and Busta Rhymes have had success in spreading the theology of the Five Percenters.

=== Literary technique ===
Rappers use the literary techniques of double entendres, alliteration, and forms of wordplay that are found in classical poetry. Similes and metaphors are used extensively in rap lyrics; rappers such as Fabolous and Lloyd Banks have written entire songs in which every line contains similes, whereas MCs like Rakim, GZA, and Jay-Z are known for the metaphorical content of their raps. Rappers such as Lupe Fiasco are known for the complexity of their songs that contain metaphors within extended metaphors.

=== Diction and dialect ===
Many hip-hop listeners believe that a rapper's lyrics are enhanced by a complex vocabulary. Kool Moe Dee claims that he appealed to older audiences by using a complex vocabulary in his raps. Rap is famous, however, for having its own vocabulary—from international hip-hop slang to regional slang. Some artists, like the Wu-Tang Clan, develop an entire lexicon among their clique. African-American English has always had a significant effect on hip-hop slang and vice versa. Certain regions have introduced their unique regional slang to hip-hop culture, such as the Bay Area (Mac Dre, E-40), Houston (Chamillionaire, Paul Wall), Atlanta (Ludacris, Lil Jon, T.I.), and Kentucky (Cunninlynguists, Nappy Roots). The Nation of Gods and Earths, aka The Five Percenters, has influenced mainstream hip-hop slang with the introduction of phrases such as "word is bond" that have since lost much of their original spiritual meaning. Preference toward one or the other has much to do with the individual; GZA, for example, prides himself on being very visual and metaphorical but also succinct, whereas underground rapper MF Doom is known for heaping similes upon similes. In still another variation, 2Pac was known for saying exactly what he meant, literally and clearly.

Rap music's development into popular culture began in the 1990s. The 1990s marked the beginning of an era of popular culture guided by the musical influences of hip-hop and rap itself, moving away from the influences of rock music. As rap continued to develop and further disseminate, it went on to influence clothing brands, movies, sports, and dancing through popular culture. As rap has developed to become more of a presence in popular culture, it has focused itself on a particular demographic, adolescent and young adults. As such, it has had a significant impact on the modern vernacular of this portion of the population, which has diffused throughout society.

The effects of rap music on modern vernacular can be explored through the study of semiotics. Semiotics is the study of signs and symbols, or the study of language as a system. French literary theorist Roland Barthes furthers this study with this own theory of myth. He maintains that the first order of signification is language and that the second is "myth", arguing that a word has both its literal meaning, and its mythical meaning, which is heavily dependent on socio-cultural context. To illustrate, Barthes uses the example of a rat: it has a literal meaning (a physical, objective description) and it has a greater socio-cultural understanding. This contextual meaning is subjective and is dynamic within society.

Through Barthes' semiotic theory of language and myth, it can be shown that rap music has culturally influenced the language of its listeners, as they influence the connotative message to words that already exist. As more people listen to rap, the words that are used in the lyrics become culturally bound to the song, and then are disseminated through the conversations that people have using these words.

Most often, the terms that rappers use are pre-established words that have been prescribed new meaning through their music, that are eventually disseminated through social spheres. This newly contextualized word is called a neosemanticism. Neosemanticisms are forgotten words that are often brought forward from subcultures that attract the attention of members of the reigning culture of their time, then they are brought forward by the influential voices in society – in this case, these figures are rappers. To illustrate, the acronym YOLO was popularized by rapper, actor and RnB singer Drake in 2012 when he featured it in his own song, "The Motto". That year the term YOLO was so popular that it was printed on t-shirts, became a trending hashtag on Twitter, and was even considered as the inspiration for several tattoos. However, although the rapper may have come up with the acronym, the motto itself was in no way first established by Drake. Similar messages can be seen in many well-known sayings, or as early as 1896, in the English translation of La Comédie Humaine, by Honoré de Balzac where one of his free-spirited characters tells another, "You Only Live Once!". Another example of a neosemanticism is the word "broccoli". Rapper E-40 initially uses the word "broccoli" to refer to marijuana, on his hit track Broccoli in 1993. In contemporary society, artists D.R.A.M. and Lil Yachty are often accredited for this slang on for their hit song, also titled "Broccoli".

With the rise in technology and mass media, the dissemination of subcultural terms has only become easier. Dick Hebdige, author of Subculture: The Meaning of Style, merits that subcultures often use music to vocalize the struggles of their experiences. As rap is also the culmination of a prevalent sub-culture in African-American social spheres, often their own personal cultures are disseminated through rap lyrics.

It is here that lyrics can be categorized as either historically influenced or (more commonly) considered as slang. Vernon Andrews, the professor of the course American Studies 111: Hip-Hop Culture, suggests that many words, such as "hood", "homie", and "dope", are historically influenced. Most importantly, this also brings forward the anarchistic culture of rap music. Common themes from rap are anti-establishment and instead, promote black excellence and diversity. It is here that rap can be seen to reclaim words, namely, "nigga", a historical term used to subjugate and oppress Black people in America. This word has been reclaimed by Black Americans and is heavily used in rap music. Niggaz With Attitude embodies this notion by using it as the first word of their influential rap group name.

== Freestyle and battle ==
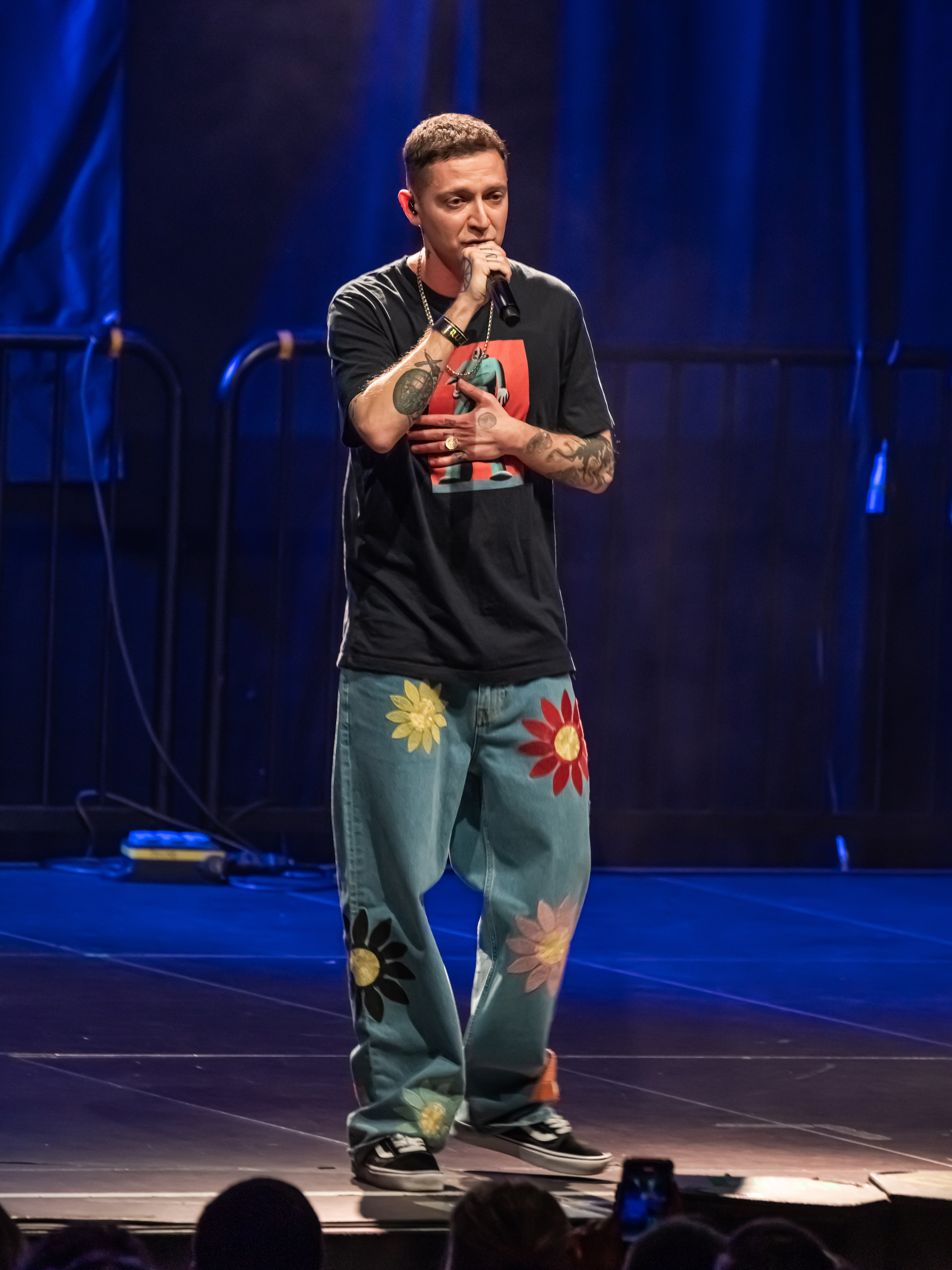
Russian rapper Oxxxymiron is one of the most viewed battle rappers in the world.

There are two kinds of freestyle rap: one is scripted (recitation), but having no particular overriding subject matter, and has yet evolved since the late 2000s to become the most commonly referred to style when the term "freestyle" is being used. Its primary focus has morphed from making up a rap on the spot, to being able to recite memorized or "written" lyrics over an "undisclosed" beat, not revealed until the performance actually begins. A variation is when a DJ or host will use multiple beats and will rotate them dynamically; it is the freestyler's job to keep their flow and not appear to trip up when the beat switches. Alternatively, keeping the rhythm or flow going can be substituted by "switching styles". This involves the rapper doing a variation of changing one's voice or tone, and/or the rhythm or flow, and potentially much more. However, this must be done smoothly, else any notoriety or respect gained can very quickly be lost all together. Some rappers have multiple characters, egos, or styles in their repertoire.

The second, more difficult and respected style, has adapted the terms "off the dome", or "off (the) top" in addition to relatively less common older references like "spitting", "on the spot" and "unscripted". Often times these terms are followed by "freestyle" e.g. Killer "Off top Freestyle" by (Artist X)! This type of rapping requires the artist to both spit their lyrics over undisclosed and possibly rotating beats, but additionally primarily completely improvise the session's rapped lyrics. Many "off top" rappers inadvertently reuse old lines, or even "cheat" by preparing segments or entire verses in advance. Therefore, "off the dome" freestyles with proven spontaneity are valued above generic, always usable, or rehearsed lines or "bars". Rappers will often reference places or objects in their immediate setting, or specific (usually demeaning) characteristics of opponents, to prove their authenticity and originality.

Battle rapping, which can be freestyled, is the competition between two or more rappers in front of an audience. The tradition of insulting one's friends or acquaintances in rhyme goes back to the dozens, and was employed famously by Muhammad Ali in his boxing matches. The winner of a battle is decided by the crowd and/or preselected judges. According to Kool Moe Dee, a successful battle rap focuses on an opponent's weaknesses, rather than one's own strengths. Television shows such as MTV's DFX and BET's 106 and Park host weekly freestyle battles live on the air. Battle rapping gained widespread public recognition outside of the African-American community with rapper Eminem's movie 8 Mile.

The strongest battle rappers will generally perform their rap fully freestyled. This is the most effective form in a battle as the rapper can comment on the other person, whether it be what they look like, how they talk, or what they wear. It also allows the rapper to reverse a line used to "diss" him or her if they are the second rapper to battle. This is known as a "flip". MC Jin was considered "World Champion" battle rapper in the mid-2000s.

== Derivatives and influence ==
Throughout hip-hop's history, new musical styles and genres have developed that contain rapping. Entire genres, such as rap rock and its derivatives rapcore and rap metal (rock/metal/punk with rapped vocals), or hip house have resulted from the fusion of rap and other styles. Many popular music genres with a focus on percussion have contained rapping at some point; be it disco (DJ Hollywood), jazz (Gang Starr), new wave (Blondie), funk (Fatback Band), contemporary R&B (Mary J. Blige), reggaeton (Daddy Yankee), or even Japanese dance music (Soul'd Out). UK garage music has begun to focus increasingly on rappers in a new subgenre called grime which emerged in London in the early 2000s and was pioneered and popularized by the MC Dizzee Rascal. Increased popularity with the music has shown more UK rappers going to America as well as tour there, such as Sway DaSafo possibly signing with Akon's label Konvict. Hyphy is the latest of these spin-offs. It is typified by slowed-down atonal vocals with instrumentals that borrow heavily from the hip-hop scene and lyrics centered on illegal street racing and car culture. Another Oakland, California group, Beltaine's Fire, has recently gained attention for their Celtic fusion sound which blends hip-hop beats with Celtic melodies. Unlike the majority of hip-hop artists, all their music is performed live without samples, synths, or drum machines, drawing comparisons to The Roots and Rage Against the Machine.

Bhangra, a widely popular style of music from Punjab, India has been mixed numerous times with reggae and hip-hop music. The most popular song in this genre in the United States was "Mundian to Bach Ke" or "Beware the Boys" by Panjabi MC and Jay-Z. Although "Mundian To Bach Ke" had been released previously, the mixing with Jay-Z popularized the genre further.

== See also ==
- Amoebaean singing
- Flyting, contests consisting of the exchange of insults, often in poetry
- Patter song
- The Rapper—1970 song addressed to women, warning them about men, rappers, who seduce them with lies, "rapping"
- Rap squat
- Sprechgesang
