= Youth subculture =

Subcultures associated with young people

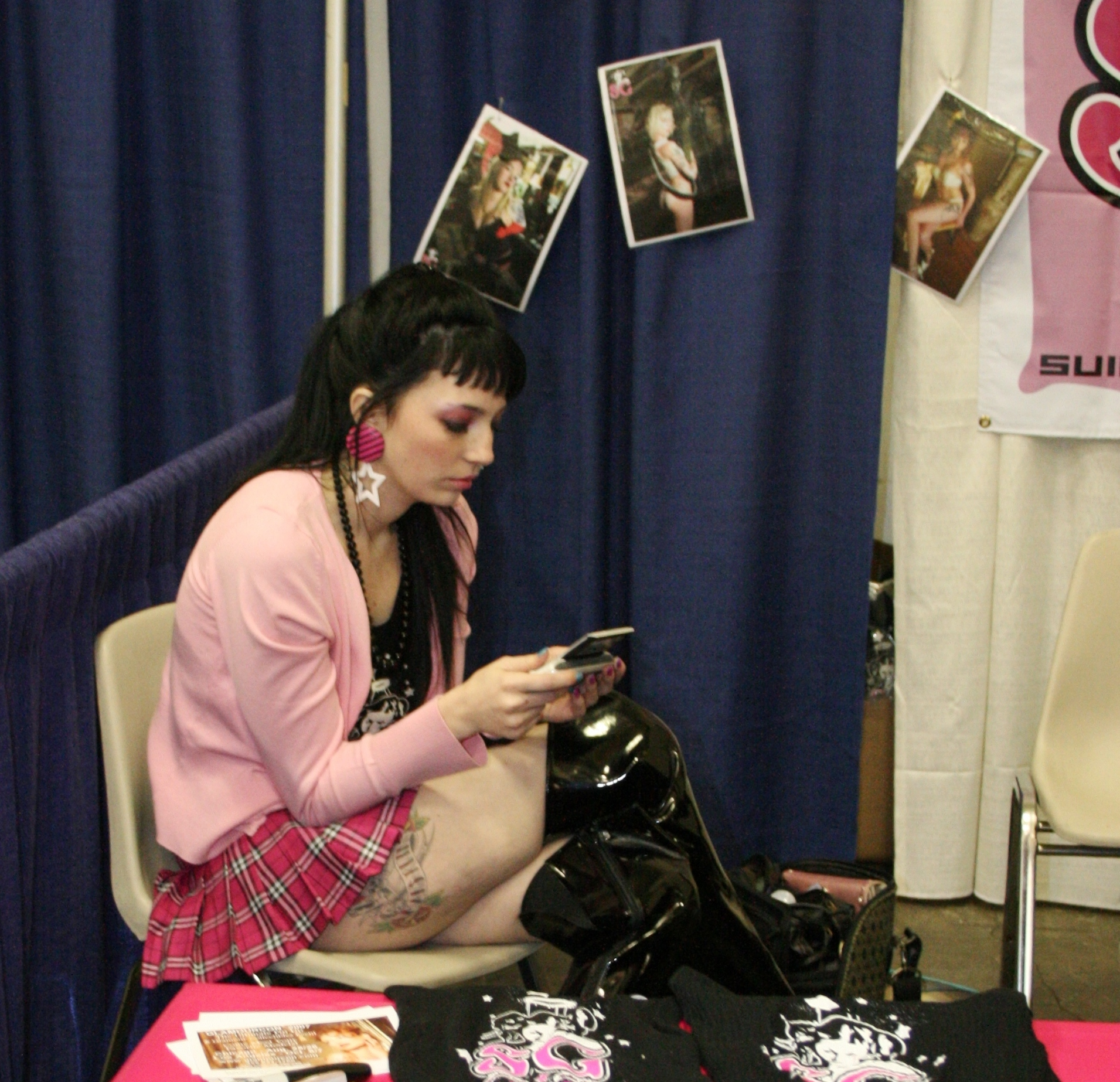
Example of a participant in Goth subculture (Los Angeles, 2007)

Youth subculture is a youth-based subculture with distinct styles, behaviors, and interests. Youth subcultures offer participants an identity outside of that ascribed by social institutions such as family, work, home and school. Youth subcultures that show a systematic hostility to the dominant culture are sometimes described as countercultures.

Youth music genres are associated with many youth subcultures, such as hip-hop, punks, emos, ravers, juggalos, metalheads, and goths. The study of subcultures often consists of the study of the symbolism attached to clothing, music and other visible affections by members of the subculture, and also, the ways in which these symbols are interpreted by members of the dominant culture.

Socioeconomic class, gender, intelligence, conformity, morality and ethnicity, can be important in relation to youth subcultures. Youth subcultures can be defined as systems, modes of expression, or lifestyles, developed by groups in subordinate structural positions in response to dominant systems, which reflect their attempt to solve structural contradictions arising from the wider societal context.

The term, scene, can refer to an exclusive subculture or faction. Scenes are distinguished from the broad culture through either fashion; identification with specific (sometimes obscure or experimental) musical genres or political perspectives; and a strong in-group or tribal mentality. The term can be used to describe geographic subsets of a subculture, such as the Detroit drum and bass scene or the London goth scene.

== Theories ==
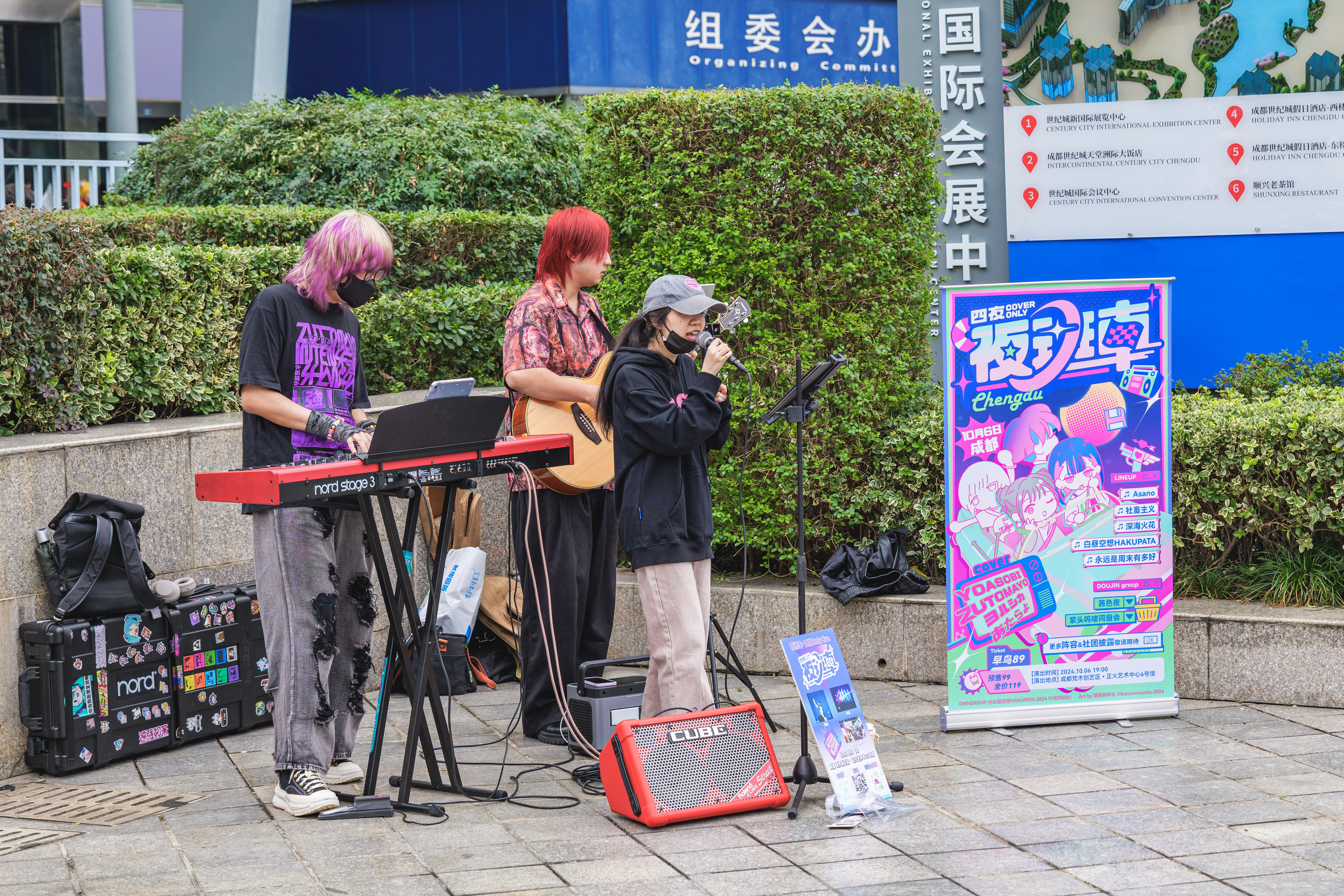
A youth band performing at the Chengdu Comiday Dojin Festival in 2024. Their appearance and items reference multiple modern youth subculture factions.

Early studies in youth culture were mainly produced by functionalist sociologists, and focus on youth as a single form of culture. In explaining the development of the culture, they utilized the concept of anomie. The generalizations involved in this theory ignore the existence of subcultures.

Marxist theories account for some diversity, because they focus on classes and class-fractions rather than youth as a whole. Stuart Hall and Tony Jefferson describe youth subcultures as symbolic or ritualistic attempts to resist the power of bourgeois hegemony by consciously adopting behavior that appears threatening to the establishment. Conversely, Marxists of the Frankfurt School of social studies argue that youth culture is inherently consumerist and integral to the divide-and-rule strategy of capitalism. They argue that it creates generation gaps and pits groups of youths against each other (e.g. mods and rockers), especially as youth culture is the dominant culture in the west.

Interactionist theorist Stan Cohen argues youth subcultures are not coherent social groupings that arise spontaneously as a reaction to social forces, but that mass media labeling results in the creation of youth subcultures by imposing an ideological framework in which people can locate their behavior. Post-structuralist theories of subculture utilize many of the ideas from these other theories, including hegemony and the role of the media. In his book, Subculture: The Meaning of Style, Dick Hebdige subcultures as a reaction of subordinated groups that challenge the hegemony of the dominant culture. This theory accounts for factors such as gender, ethnicity and age. Youth can be seen as a subordinate group in relation to the dominant, adult society.

Historical theorist Steven Mintz claims that until about 1955, youth subculture as such did not exist. Children aspired to (or were pulled into) adulthood as fast as their physical development allowed. Marcel Danesi argues that since then, the media, advertisers and others have made youth the dominant culture of Western societies, to the point that many people retain what others consider to be immature attitudes far into adulthood. This is further supported by P. Lewis, who claims that youth culture did not originate until the 1950s, with the development of rock and roll. However, other historians have said that youth culture may have developed earlier, particularly in the inter-war period. There were examples of new youth subcultures emerging throughout that period, such as the flapper.

Subcultures may also be seen as extensions of crowds, subcultures that emerge within a specific school. Certain crowds (jocks, geeks, preppies, druggies, emos) are found in many, even most, high schools across the United States, though the particular terms used by the adolescents in them may vary (nerds instead of geeks, etc.). Most of these can be found in other Western countries as well, with the exception of jocks (the United States is unusual in having athletics specifically affiliated with schools, although similar athletic affiliation groups exist in British public schools.)

== See also ==
- Beat Generation
- Counterculture of the 1960s
- Hungry Generation
- La Sape
- List of generations
- List of subcultures
- Street fashion
- Trash culture
- Youth culture
- Youth voice
