= Scooterboy =

Member of one of several scooter-related subcultures of the 1960s

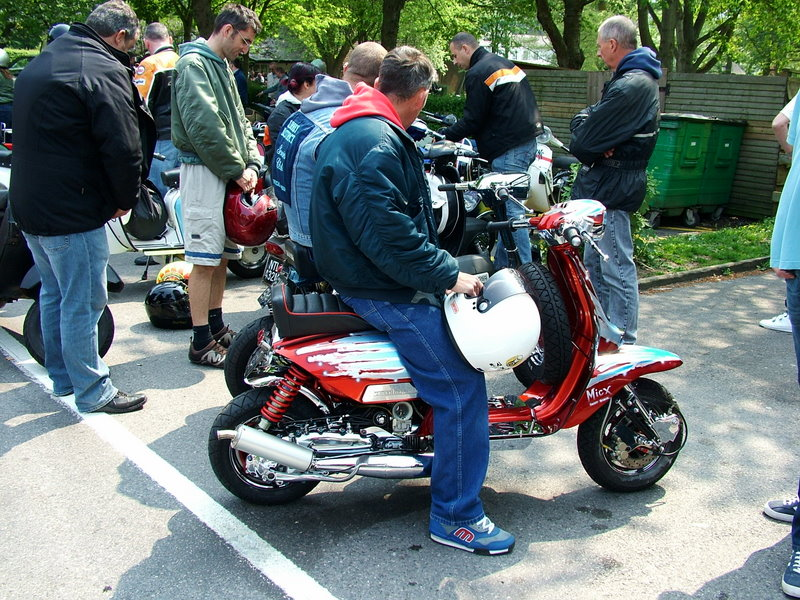

A scooterboy (or scooter boy) is a member of one of several scooter-related subcultures of the 1960s and later decades, alongside rude boys, mods and skinheads. The term is sometimes used as a catch-all designation for any scootering enthusiast who does not fall into the latter three categories.

== Definitions ==
Michael Brake identifies the subculture differently, classifying it as a subgroup of the mods, alongside "art school mods", "mainstream mods", and "hard mods". Scooter boys, according to Brake, had "Italian motor scooters (a working-class sports car) covered in accessories and anoraks and wide jeans".

According to Colin Shattuck and Eric Peterson, a scooter boy is more specifically, "one who attends scooter rallies and accumulates event patches on a garment of some kind". The garment is conventionally a MA-1 bomber jacket(Scooter Jacket), but can be any of several other types of jacket, a mechanic's, a motorcyclist's, or even a parka. According to Kayleen Hazlehurst, the scooterboy with anorak, accessory-covered scooter and industrial work boots was a late-1960s/early-1970s halfway house between the mods and the skinheads.

Scooterboy Gaz Kishere suggests a less reductive view of this is that scooter boys emerged as a break away from a strongly 'new mod' conformity of the late 70's mod revival which saw a massive re-ignition of scooter riders and interest in traveling to scooter rallies. It enabled people to identify with more diverse groups such as punks, psychobillies or for those new to the scooter scene to keep their own original subculture identity. However the scooterboy 'birth' was also a reaction to the 'new mod' scene from those who adopted this as a passing interest or sought to no longer conform to the mainstreaming of the then scooter scene, or never were mods. It would be difficult to reduce scooterboys to patch wearing enthusiasts or as a subgroup of mods. As scooter boys continued to find the freedom to emerge, they were as likely to own a leather motorcycle jacket, a grinder, welder, black paint and have long hair. In reality, the antithesis of the Quadrophenia mod.

Music biographer Mick Middles observes that the flight-jacketed scooter boy with Dr. Martens shoes was a slightly different image, favoured by scooter boys in the late 1970s scooter revival. He describes the Lambretta boom period from 1968 to 1973 as featuring:

[g]iant packs of scooter boys surg[ing] out every Sunday from the big Lancashire towns ... avoiding the faster, dirtier motorbiking 'greasers' and clashing with each other in Blackpool and Southport. Those were the days of Crombie coats and two-tone 'tonic' trousers, of brogues ... and Barathea blazers, of smartness, neatness, in clothes as in music.

He characterises the late 1970s revival, in contrast, as "something of an oddity", in which scooter owners were "more concerned with the machine — the mechanics, the practicalities — than the look.

== See also ==
- Cutdown
