= Subculture: The Meaning of Style =

1979 book by Dick Hebdige

- Author: Dick Hebdige
- Language: English
- Subject: Youth subculture
- Publisher: Methuen
- Publication date: 1979
- Publication place: United Kingdom
- Media type: Book

Subculture: The Meaning of Style is a 1979 book by Dick Hebdige, focusing on Britain's postwar youth subculture styles as symbolic forms of resistance. Drawing from Marxist theorists, literary critics, French structuralists, and American sociologists, Hebdige presents a model for analyzing youth subcultures. While Hebdige argues that each subculture undergoes the same trajectory, he outlines the individual style differences of specific subcultures, such as Teddy boys, mods, rockers, skinheads, and punks. Hebdige emphasizes the historical, class, race, and socioeconomic conditions that surrounded the formation of each subculture. While Subculture: The Meaning of Style is one of the most influential books on the theory of subcultures, it faces a range of critiques.

== Influences ==
Hebdige studied under Stuart Hall at the Birmingham University's Centre for Contemporary Cultural Studies. Hebdige's model somewhat builds from Hall's understanding of subcultures, and his theory of Encoding/Decoding. Hall sees different subcultures as representative of the variety of ways one can handle the "raw material of social ... existence." Hebdige also incorporates and responds to the literary criticism of Richard Hoggart and Raymond Williams; the Marxist theories of ideology of Louis Althusser, Bertolt Brecht, Antonio Gramsci, and Henri Lefebvre; and the American subcultural sociology of William F. Whyte and Albert K. Cohen, and the French structuralism of Roland Barthes, Julia Kristeva, Claude Lévi-Strauss, and Jacques Lacan.

== Summary ==
In Subculture: The Meaning of Style, Hebdige argues that the styles of Britain's postwar working-class youth subcultures challenge dominant ideology, hegemony, and social normalization through symbolic forms of resistance. Hebdige focuses, in particular, on the evolution of styles in subcultures such as Teddy boys, mods, rockers, skinheads and punks. According to Hebdige, style is constructed through a combination of clothing, music, dance, make-up and drugs. Hebdige emphasizes the historical, socioeconomic, class, race, and mass media contexts of each subculture. For instance, Hebdige argues that there is a common theme underlying the white punk and black reggae subcultures; both reject British national symbolism. Although seemingly unrelated, Hebdige proves this point by outlining the similarities in their styles.

Hebdige argues that all subcultures experience the same trajectory. In this model, subcultures initially form through a common resistance. The dominant society often sees these groups as radical, leading to fear, skepticism, and anxiety in their response. In some ways, this gives the subculture's resistance more power but only momentarily, because eventually entrepreneurs find a way to commodify the style and music of the subculture. Before long, elements of the subculture are available to the mainstream, e.g. Edwardian jackets of the Teddy boys. In this way, what was once subversive, rebellious, and radical, is now contained. For this reason, it is often the case that the moment when dominant society begins to recognize a subculture is the moment that the resistant power of the subculture begins to die.

== Response and criticism ==
While Hebdige's Subculture: The Meaning of Style is viewed in cultural studies as one of the most influential theories and analyses of youth subcultures, there are many who found the book lacking. Hebdige's theory has, nonetheless, been upheld within the field. Many scholars have applied Hebdige's model of subculture to other subcultures not identified in his book. For instance, Agnes Jasper uses Hebdige to explore the Dutch Gothic subculture. Sunaina Maira applies Hebdige's model to Indian-American youth subculture.

Critiques include:

- The theory does not translate well to American subcultures because the class consciousness does not work the same way.
- Hebdige places too much emphasis on the symbolic meaning of style, thereby overlooking other aspects of youth rebellion.
- The theory overlooks the variety of efforts outside of style in which subcultures engage.
- The book relies on a thorough knowledge of Britain's youth cultures that some readers may not have.
- Some passages are vague, lacking focus, which hurts Hebdige's argument.
- Hebdige's methodology and basis for his interpretations lacks sufficient scholarly research.
- Hebdige does not attempt to explain why style is the form in which resistance and subversion manifests.
- Hebdige idealizes the punk subculture.
- The book lacks sufficient discussion on the definition and significance of sexuality in relation to punks.
- The book only begins to resolve the relationships between sociology and semiotics, and style and subculture.
