= Cutdown =

Customised scooter

A cutdown is a customised scooter (usually an Italian Vespa or Lambretta) with parts of the bodywork removed or cut away. Cutdowns were popular amongst skinheads and scooterboys during the mod revival of the 1970s and 1980s. While the style-obsessed British mod youth subculture of the 1960s prized the glamorous, metropolitan image of scooters, many skinheads and scooterboys viewed their bikes as simply a form of transportation.

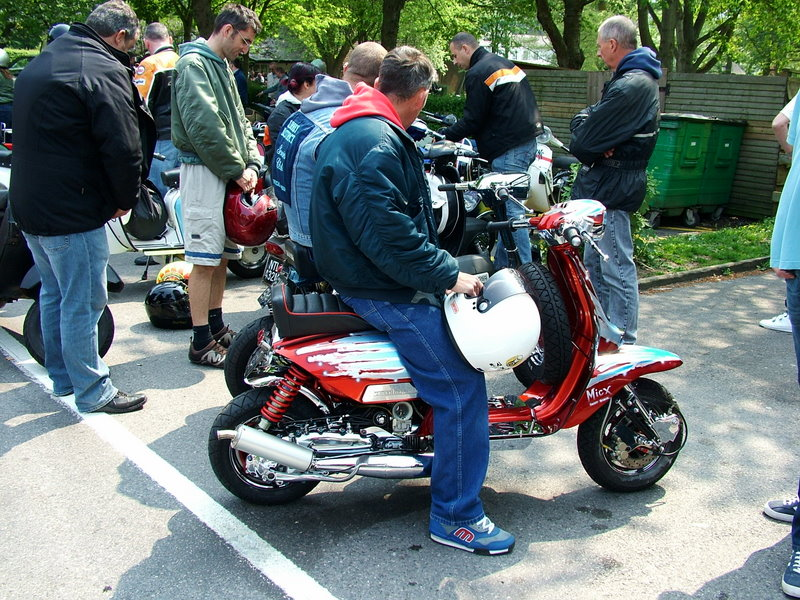
This "naked" Lambretta has been cut down and customized.

While some scooter enthusiasts have focused on the stripped-down look, with just a bare frame and visible engine and mechanical parts, some scooterboys put back almost as much hardware as they had taken off, by adding customized chrome-plated accessories and racks.

== Modifications ==
Many cutdowns have unneeded parts removed to improve power-to-weight ratio. Typically the front mudguards, leg shields, floors, rear section and side panels are removed. Cutting away body parts is the easiest with Lambretta scooters, because they are built on a tubular frame, which means that the body parts do not have a structural role. Vespa scooters, on the other hand, are usually built with a unibody design, so the body panels give the bike its structure. This means that when Vespas are cut down, they cannot be made as bare-bones as a Lambretta. The body panels of a Vespa are modified by slimming them down or giving them a different shape, in such a way that the structural soundness of the bike is not compromised.

Cutdowns are often tuned – much like a four-wheeled hot rod – by overboring the cylinders to increase engine power or adding performance exhausts, modified carburettors, or aftermarket shock absorbers. Some enthusiasts replace the standard drum front brakes with hydraulic disc brakes or add water cooling radiators. Lambretta owners may replace existing parts with a Nikasil plated aluminium barrel with radical porting, large Dell'Orto or Mikuni carburettors and bespoke (custom-made) expansion chambers, hydraulic clutches, and modern low-profile tyres. Some scooterists use aluminum Fabrizi racing barrels, because they use a rotary induction mechanism. Stock gas tanks may be replaced with increased capacity tanks, which put the weight of the fuel further forward. Some riders install a small fairing to reduce wind resistance and enable higher speeds and stability. To reduce weight, some scooterists use lighter-weight aftermarket parts, such as carbon fibre sports seats and other parts made from carbon fibre, carbon kevlar and fiberglass.

Some cutdowns have been used for drag racing. At scooter races, cutdowns often race in a separate category called the "specials", which is for cutdown and heavily modified racing scooters. The other scooter race categories include stock races with relatively unmodified larger scooters (152 to 250 cc) and "small frame" races for scooters with 136 cc or smaller engines. For races, scooters usually have to have accessories removed, such as center and side stands, mirrors, turn signals that stick out, and luggage racks. Scooter races often disallow performance-enhancing fuel additives such as octane booster.

== Related scooter types ==
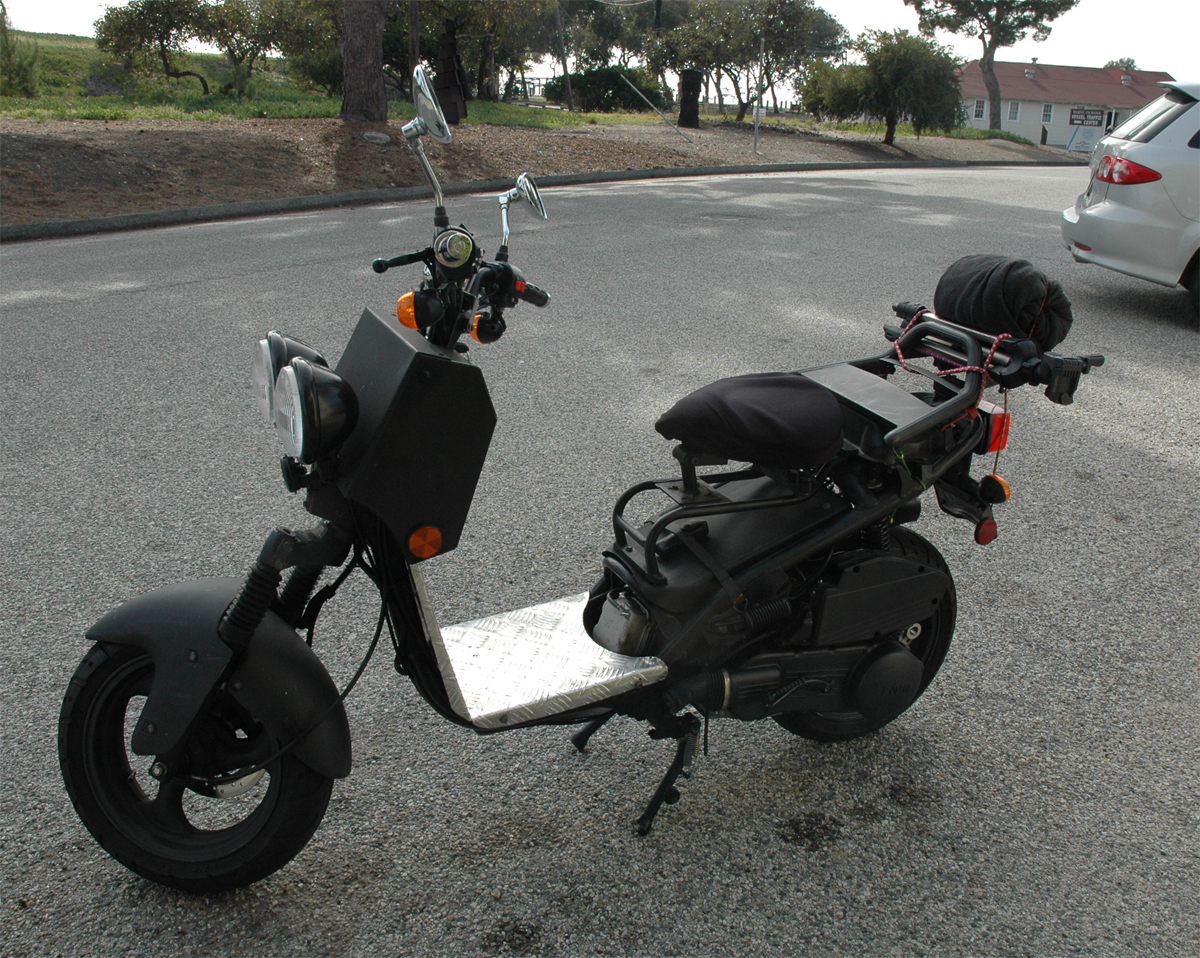
A Baja 150cc scooter.

A cutdown scooter resembles a "naked scooter", which is a scooter designed without panels covering the engine and with little or no bodywork. The difference between the two types is that while a cutdown scooter started as a regular scooter with body panels and bodywork, before it was customized, a "naked scooter" is designed and manufactured as a "bare-bones" vehicle. In the 1960s, Lambretta models A through D were in this category. In the 1990s, Italjet produced a stripped-down scooter called the Dragster. In the 2000s Honda produced the Ruckus, which had the motor mounted in a skeleton-style metal frame.

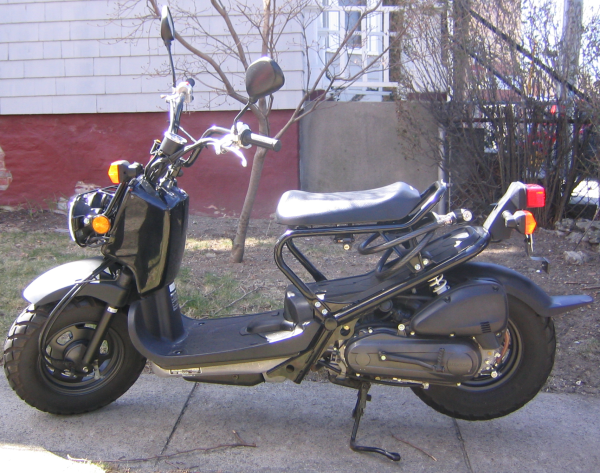
The Honda Ruckus uses a skeleton-style frame without body paneling

Another scooter type which is related to cutdowns is the "chopper", which is an extreme cutdown scooter with extra-long front forks. These bikes are mostly made using Lambrettas, because when the bodywork is removed from their tubular frame they resemble smaller custom style motorcycles. "Rats" are cutdowns which are made by putting together old parts to create a rough-looking, unpainted bike. In contrast to many other scooter enthusiasts, "rat" builders view blemishes and unrepaired dents as attractive. The "rat" approach to scooter customizing is similar to the rat rod style of hot rodding, in which old cars often have original paint with rust patches, or even just bare rusty metal. Major scooter rallies which give prizes to scooters sometimes put "chopper" and "rat" scooters in a separate category from the rest of the cutdowns.

== See also ==
- Hot rod
- Skinhead
- Scooterboy
- Kustom Kulture
