= Youth culture =

Shared values and practices of young people

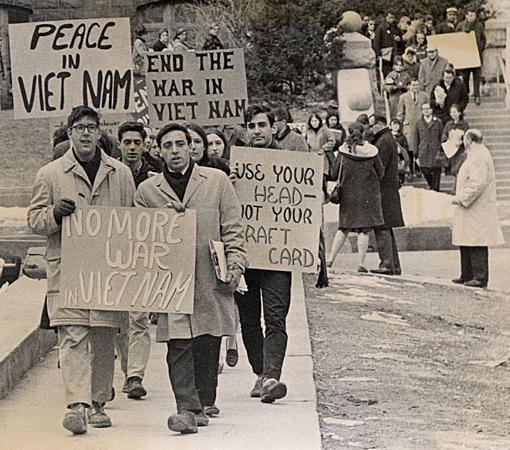
Student Vietnam War protesters in 1965

Youth culture refers to the societal norms of children, adolescents, and young adults. Specifically, it comprises the processes and symbolic systems that are shared by the youth and are distinct from those of adults in the community.

An emphasis on clothes, popular music, sports, vocabulary, and dating typically sets youth apart from other age groups. Within youth culture, there are many constantly changing youth subcultures, which may be divided based on race, ethnicity, economic status, public appearance, or a variety of other factors.

== Existence ==
There is a debate surrounding the presence, existence, and origins of youth culture. Some researchers argue that youth culture is not a separate culture, as their values and morals are not distinct from those of their parents. Additionally, peer influence varies greatly among contexts, gender, age, and social status, making a single "youth culture" difficult to define. Janssen et al. used the terror management theory (TMT) to argue for the existence of youth culture. They tested the following hypothesis: "If youth culture serves to help adolescents deal with problems of vulnerability and finiteness, then reminders of mortality should lead to increased allegiance to cultural practices and beliefs of the youth." The results supported the hypothesis and the outcome of previous studies, and suggest that youth culture is a culture.

Schwartz and Merten used adolescent language to argue that youth culture is distinct from the rest of society. Schwartz argued that high school students used their vocabulary to create meanings that are distinct to adolescents. Specifically, the adolescent status terminology (the words that adolescents use to describe hierarchical social statuses) contains qualities and attributes that are not present in adult status judgments. According to Schwartz, this reflects a difference in social structures and the ways that adults and teens experience social reality. This difference indicates cultural differences between adolescents and adults, which supports the presence of separate youth culture.

== Movements ==
Throughout the twentieth century, youth have had a strong influence on both lifestyle and culture. The flappers and the Mods are two examples of the impact of youth culture on society. The flappers were young women that were confident about a prosperous future after World War I. This liveliness showed in their new attitudes in life in which they openly drank, smoked, and, in some cases, socialized with gangster-type men. The fashionable dress at the time also reflected the flapper's new lifestyle.

Mods emerged during a time of war and political and social troubles, and stemmed from a group called the modernists. They were young men and women who came from all classes who believed that their fashion choices "gave them entrée everywhere" and empowered them. The Mods' style and embrace of modern technology spread from the UK overseas to North America and other countries.

== Theories ==
The presence of youth culture is a relatively recent historical phenomenon. There are several dominant theories about the emergence of youth culture in the 20th century, which include hypotheses about the historical, economic, and psychological influences on the presence of youth culture. One historical theory credits the emergence of youth culture to the beginning of compulsory schooling. James Coleman argues that age segregation is the root of separate youth culture. Before mandatory education, many children and adolescents interacted primarily with adults. In contrast, modern children associate extensively with others their age. These interactions allow adolescents to develop shared experiences and meanings, which are the root of youth culture.

Another theory posits that some cultures facilitate the development of youth culture, while others do not. The basis of this distinction is the presence of universalistic or particularistic norms. Particularistic norms are guidelines for behavior that vary from one individual to another. In contrast, universalistic norms apply to all members of society. Universalistic norms are more likely to be found in industrialized societies. Modernization in the last century has encouraged universalistic norms since interaction in modern societies makes it necessary for everyone to learn the same set of norms. Modernization and universalistic norms have encouraged the growth of youth culture. The need for universalistic norms has made it impractical for young people's socialization to come primarily from immediate family members, which would lead to significant variation in the communicated norms. Therefore, many societies use age grouping, such as in schools, to educate their children on societies' norms and prepare them for adulthood; youth culture is a byproduct of this tactic. Because children spend so much time together and learn the same things as the rest of their age group, they develop their own culture.

Psychological theorists have noted the role of youth culture in identity development. Youth culture may be a means of finding identity when one's path in life is not always clear. Erik Erikson theorized that the vital psychological conflict of adolescence is identity versus role confusion. The goal of this stage of life is to answer the question, "Who am I?"

In many societies, adolescents are expected to behave like children and take on adult roles. Some psychologists have theorized that forming youth culture is a step to adopt an identity that reconciles these two conflicting expectations. For example, Talcott Parsons posited that adolescence is when young people transition from reliance on parents to autonomy. In this transitory state, dependence on the peer group serves as a stand-in for parents. Burlingame restated this hypothesis in 1970. He wrote that adolescents replace parents with the peer group and that this reliance on the peer group diminishes as youth enter adulthood and take on adult roles.

Frank A. Fasick relates youth culture as a method of identity development to the simultaneous elongation of childhood and the need for independence in adolescence. According to Fasick, adolescents face contradictory pulls from society. Compulsory schooling keeps them socially and economically dependent on their parents, while young people need to achieve some sort of independence to participate in the market economy of modern society. As a means of coping with these contrasting aspects of adolescence, youth create freedom through behavior—specifically, through leisure-oriented activities done with peers.

== Impact on adolescents ==
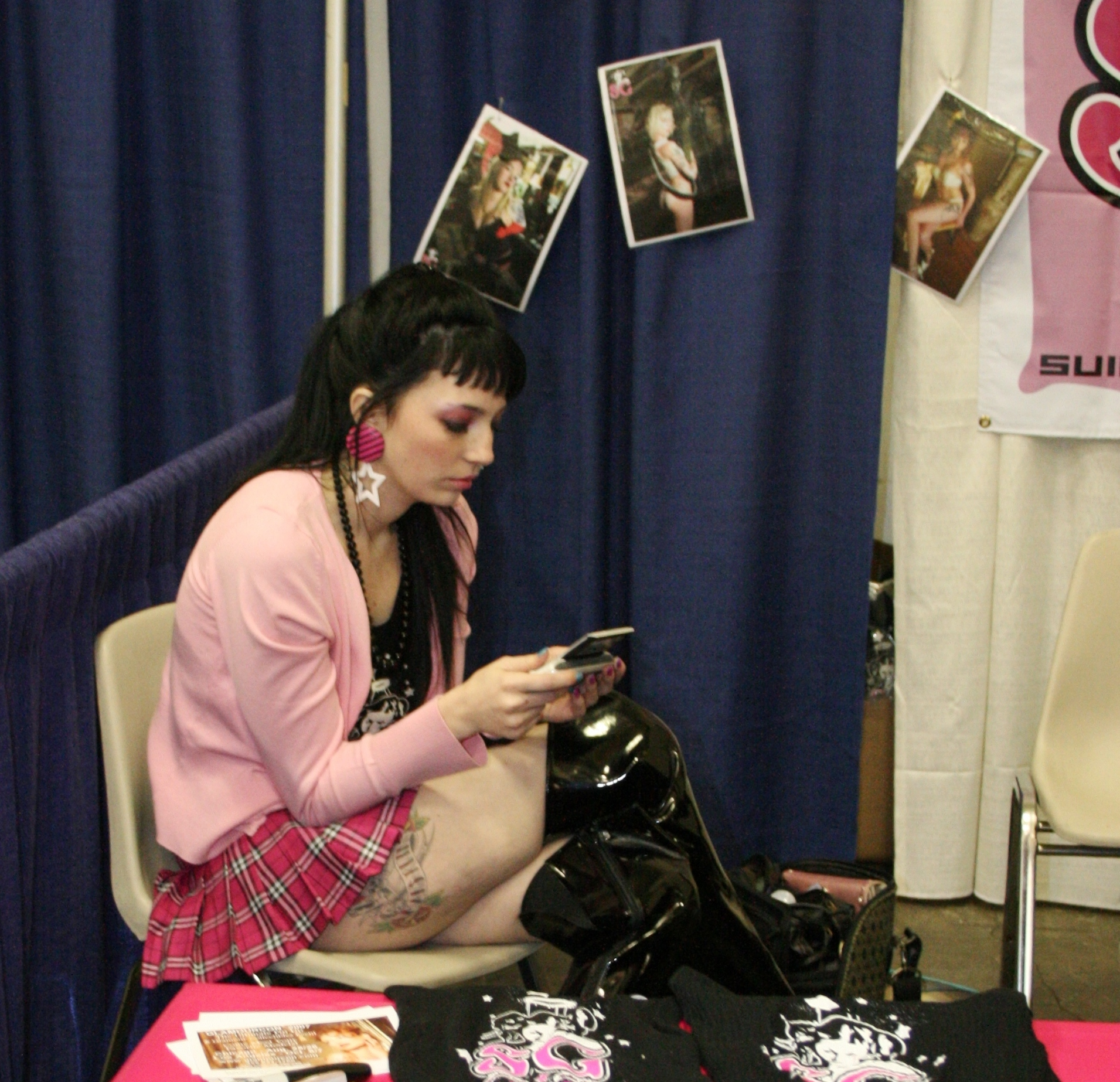
Example of a participant of emo youth subculture

For decades, adults have worried that youth subcultures were the root of moral degradation and changing values in younger generations. Researchers have characterized youth culture as embodying values that are "in conflict with those of the adult world". Common concerns about youth culture include a perceived lack of interest in education, involvement in risky behaviors like substance use and sexual activity, and engaging extensively in leisure activities. These perceptions have led many adults to believe that adolescents hold different values than older generations and to perceive youth culture as an attack on the morals of current society. These worries have prompted the creation of parenting websites such as The Youth Culture Report and the Center for Parent Youth Understanding, whose goal is to preserve the values of older generations in young people.

There is no consensus among researchers about whether youth subcultures hold different beliefs than adults do. Some researchers have noted the simultaneous rise in age segregation and adolescent adjustment problems such as suicide, delinquency, and premarital pregnancy. However, most evidence suggests that these youth problems are not a reflection of different morals held by younger generations. Multiple studies have found that most adolescents hold views that are similar to their parents. One study challenged the theory that adolescent cohorts had distanced themselves from their parents by finding that between 1976 and 1982, their problems increased, and they became less peer-oriented. A second study's findings that adolescents' values were more similar to their parents in the 1980s than in the 1960s and '70s echoes Sebald's finding. Another study did find differences between adolescents' and parents' attitudes but found that the differences were in the degree of belief, not in the behavior itself.

There may also be pluralistic ignorance on the part of youth when comparing their attitudes to peers and parents. A study by Lerner et al. asked college students to compare their attitudes on several issues to their peers and parents. Most students rated their attitudes as falling somewhere between their parents' more conservative attitudes and their peers' more liberal attitudes. The authors suggested that the reason for this is that the students perceived their friends as more liberal than they were.

Sports, language, music, clothing, and dating tend to be superficial ways of expressing autonomy—they can be adopted without compromising one's beliefs or values. Some areas in which adolescents assert autonomy can cause long-term consequences, such as substance use and sexual activity.

The impact of youth culture on deviance and sexual behavior is debatable. More than 70 percent of American high school students report having drunk alcohol. Similarly, about two-thirds of teenagers have engaged in sexual intercourse by the time they leave high school. As drinking and having sex may be common in adolescence, many researchers include them as aspects of youth culture. While engaging in these activities can have harmful consequences, the majority of adolescents who engage in these risky behaviors do not suffer long-term consequences. The possibilities of addiction, pregnancy, incarceration, and other negative outcomes are some potentially negative effects of participation in youth culture. Research demonstrates that many factors may influence youth to engage in high-risk behaviors, including "a lack of stable role models, heightened family stresses, lowered levels of family investment, weakened emotional bonds between parents and their children, lowered levels of social capital and social control, and a lack of hope in ones [sic] future".

Teen culture may also have benefits for adolescents. Peer influence can have a positive effect on adolescents' well-being; for example, most teens report that peer pressure stops them from using drugs or engaging in sexual activity.

== Impact on society in general ==
Young people can make changes in society, such as through youth-led revolutions. Organizations of young people, which were often based on student identity, were crucial to the American civil rights movement, which included organizations like the Southern Student Organizing Committee, Students for a Democratic Society, and the Student Nonviolent Coordinating Committee. The Freedom Summer campaign relied heavily on college students; hundreds of students engaged in registering African Americans to vote, teaching in "Freedom Schools", and organizing the Mississippi Freedom Democratic Party.

The American protests in the Vietnam War were also student-driven. Many college campuses opposed the war with sit-ins and demonstrations. Organizations such as the Young Americans for Freedom, the Student Libertarian Movement, and the Student Peace Union were based on youth status and contributed to anti-war activities. Some scholars have claimed that the activism during the Vietnam War was symbolic of a youth culture whose values were against mainstream American culture.

In the early 2010s, the Arab Spring illustrated how young people played roles in demonstrations and protests. The movement was initiated primarily by young people, mostly college students dissatisfied with the opportunities afforded to them. The participation of young people prompted Time magazine to include several youth members of the movement in its 2011 list of 100 most influential people. Additionally, this movement utilized social media (which is considered an aspect of youth culture) to schedule, coordinate, and publicize events.

== See also ==
- Bohemianism
- Children's clothing
- Crowds
- Yuppie
- After-Eighty generation
- Youth subculture
- Lost Generation
  - Interbellum Generation
- Greatest Generation
- Silent Generation
- Baby Boomers
  - Generation Jones
- Generation X
  - Xennials
- Millennials
  - Zillennials
- Generation Z
- List of subcultures
- Generation
