= Dick Hebdige =

English sociologist

- Born: 1951 (age 74–75)
- Education: Centre for Contemporary Cultural Studies
- Occupations: Media theorist, sociologist
- Employer: University of California, Santa Barbara
- Known for: Subcultural studies
- Notable work: Subculture: The Meaning of Style (1979)
- Movement: New Left

Dick Hebdige (born 1951) is an English media theorist and sociologist, and a professor emeritus of art and media studies at the University of California, Santa Barbara, where he taught from 2002 to 2021. His work is commonly associated with the study of subcultures, and its resistance against the mainstream of society. His current research interests include media topographies, desert studies, and performative criticism.

Hebdige has written extensively on contemporary art, design, media and cultural studies, on mod style, reggae, postmodernism and style, surrealism, improvisation, and Takashi Murakami. He has published three books: Subculture: The Meaning of Style (1979), Cut’n’mix: Culture, Identity and Caribbean Music (1987), and Hiding in the Light: On images and Things (1988). From 1974 to 2016, he published more than 57 essays and articles.

== Early life and education ==
Hebdige received his Master of Arts (MA) degree from the Centre for Contemporary Cultural Studies in Birmingham, England, and an honorary Ph.D. degree from Goldsmiths, University of London (formerly known as Goldsmiths' College).

== Professional career ==
Hebdige has been teaching at art schools since the mid-1970s. Since 1992, Hebdige has been working on arts administration, events planning, program development, and curriculum innovation first at CalArts (2001-2008), then at the University of California, Santa Barbara (UCSB) as director of the Interdisciplinary Humanities Center from 2005 and as co-director of the University of California Institute for Research in the Arts (UCIRA). He served as the dean of critical studies and the director of the experimental writing program at the California Institute of the Arts before going to UCSB, where he served as professor of film and media studies and art studio from 2002 - 2021. Hebdige also served as scholar in residence at the University of Houston in 2007 where he has given multimedia lectures and performance series with the Cynthia Woods Mitchell Center for the Arts.

In partnership with the Future Art Research Institute in Phoenix, Arizona, Hebdige launched UCIRA’s Desert Studies Project in 2009. The program, now run from UCSB, is "a pilot program in interdisciplinary arts-centered research, immersion pedagogy, and process curating," aiming to "integrate arts-based research and the production, performance and exhibition of artworks into Desert Studies." The project invites students, faculty, and the public to make art that is "immersive" in the desert in multiple ways.

== Major publications ==
Hebdige's 1979 book Subculture: The Meaning of Style was written between 1977 and 1978 amid the unfolding of punk in the United Kingdom. Hebdige, in his mid-twenties at the time, had just graduated with a Master of Arts degree from Birmingham University’s Centre for Contemporary Cultural Studies (CCCS). At this time, the domain of cultural studies was just emerging. Subculture was commissioned by University of Cardiff English professor and editor, Terence Hawkes, as part of a series published by Methuen called New Accents (aimed at introducing theoretical and interpretive approaches to English literature students). The commission was an opportunity for Hebdige to continue graduate work on developing a contextual, culturalist model of youth culture and consumption. Specifically, linking the concerns of youth culture, consumption, and the politics of insubordination to debates within aesthetics, semiotics, and poststructuralism. Hebdige states that “the aspiration was to blur the line between specialized, discipline-embedded academic and intellectually curious subcultural, non-academic readerships.” The book serves as a mirror of bricolage subculture, with “do-it-yourself bricolaged theory for do-it-yourself bricolaged subculture.”

Whereas previous research was concerned with the relation between subcultures and social class in postwar Britain, Hebdige saw youth cultures in terms of a dialogue between black and white youth. He argues that punk emerged as a mainly white style when black youth became more separatist in the 1970s in response to discrimination in British society. Previous research described a homology between the different aspects of a subcultural style (dress, hairstyle, music, drugs), while Hebdige argues that punk in London in 1976-77 borrowed from all previous subcultures and its only homology was chaos. In making this argument, he draws on the early work of Julia Kristeva who also found such subversion of meaning in French poets such as Mallarmé and Lautréamont.

Hebdige’s 1987 book Cut’n’Mix: Culture, Identity and Caribbean Music focuses on the music of the Caribbean including calypso, ska, reggae, and Caribbean club culture. Cut’n’Mix traces the roots of this music and describes the style and cultural identity that have developed alongside it. Specifically, the book addresses the African and Caribbean roots of the music in relation to religion and the myth and importance of rhythm, the music of Trinidad, the story of reggae, the musical and spiritual inheritance of Rastafari, the Jamaican record industry, and the scene of black British reggae, white Jamaican music, Two Tone, and the legacy of punk.

Hebdige’s 1988 book Hiding in the Light: On Images and Things is a collection of essays examining the creation and consumption of objects and images, including fashion and documentary photographs, 1950s streamlined cars, Italian motor scooters, 1980s style manuals, Biff cartoons, the Band Aid campaign, pop art, and pop music videos. Hebdige considers their cultural significance and impact on popular taste within the framework of modernity, postmodernity, and popular culture: “The wider questions raised in these debates are addressed throughout this book, but the stress falls on the ‘thing itself’ – and the author concludes that it is only by grounding our analysis in the study of particular images and objects that we can counteract the limitations of semiotics, mass culture theory and the vertigo of postmodernism.”

== Thought ==
In interviews, Hebdige often challenges typical expectations and depictions of his role in academia. He has also spoken out about the division between his work as a writer and his job as a professor and lecturer, saying: “I tend to separate my writing – most of it for the last twenty years for art catalogs – from the teaching and other University work so that the conventional research component of what I do is in effect detached from my daily life in the academy. For instance, I’ve never taught a class on youth subculture though as an academic I’m identified almost exclusively with that topic because of a book I wrote more than 30 years ago.”

== Publications ==
- Subculture: The Meaning of Style. London & New York: Routledge, 1979.
- Cut‘n’Mix: Culture, Identity and Caribbean Music. London & New York: Routledge, 1987.
- Hiding in the Light: On Images and Things. London & New York: Routledge, 1988.

Contributions

- Sound Unbound: Sampling Digital Music and Culture. Cambridge, MA: MIT Press, 2008. Edited by Paul D. Miller a.k.a. DJ Spooky. ISBN 9780262633635. Hebdige contributed a chapter.
