= 311 Boyz =

Teen gang in Las Vegas, Nevada

- Type: Gang
- Purpose: Illegal Activities
- Methods: Violence, Vandalism, Arson, Bullying, Riot
- Members: 140 (2003)
- Key people: Steven Gazlay

The 311 Boyz was a teen gang in Las Vegas, Nevada, estimated at 140 members, who beginning in the summer of 2003 committed or were suspected of a number of violent acts. In 2003, the gang consisted mostly of young males who attended Centennial High School and lived in the northwest area of Las Vegas.

== Background ==
The group gained notoriety following an incident in July 2003. It was originally reported that this group of teenagers was a gang, and the media continued to use the term even when Judge Michael Cherry later determined the group did not fit the legal definition of a gang. At a party, three teens (Stephen Tanner Hansen, Joseph Grill, Craig Lefevre) in a pickup truck fled from the scene in fear of an altercation. A group of teens gave chase on foot and in other cars after the driver struck the vehicle of a teen boy who was punching the passenger of the pickup truck in the face. The pickup was rammed from behind at least once, and as it attempted to exit the housing subdivision, a gauntlet of teens threw bottles and rocks at the speeding vehicle. A softball-sized rock went through a window, striking Hansen, one of the passengers, in the arm and head. Hansen survived: his arm was broken; his face was shattered, requiring metal plates to stabilize the bones; and his vision was permanently impaired in one eye. As he would later testify, he might have been killed if he hadn't raised his arm and partially deflected the rock.

Nine teens involved in the attack on the pickup would be charged with various criminal offenses, including attempted murder; the charges against one defendant were dropped before any trials. Of the remaining eight, five pleaded guilty to lesser felony charges, and accepted plea agreements where the prosecution would not seek additional jail time, but on 6 August 2004, District Judge Michael Cherry ignored the prosecution's recommendations and sentenced four of the defendants to a year in detention; the fifth defendant received probation. Two defendants would plead guilty to lesser charges and receive probation; the final defendant, Scott Morse, was acquitted at trial.

Police reports indicated that they suspected Steven Gazlay, one of the four who received jail time, of being the ringleader of the group. Soon after the charges were filed in the Hansen case, Gazlay was charged with a separate assault at a party in May 2003, where he assaulted another teen with a crowbar. A jury found him guilty in that case in December 2003. Gazlay was also accused of burning a teen with a red-hot knife and ramming a condominium gate, but as part of Gazlay's plea agreement, those charges were dismissed, and the crowbar assault verdict was set aside.

The ensuing police investigation would discover links between many of the defendants and at least nine assaults in the area, as well as video tapes of fighting between teenagers, taken by another teen.

== Origin of name ==
CBS News speculated that the name might be a coded reference to the Ku Klux Klan: K is the 11th letter of the alphabet, and there are 3 in "KKK".

== Criticism ==
Some research argues that the 311 Boyz phenomenon fits into Stanley Cohen's definition of a media-induced moral panic, with specific reference to The Las Vegas Review-Journal's newspaper coverage of the 311 Boyz incidents. Excessive amounts of highly critical coverage by The Las Vegas Review-Journal may have created the appearance of an imminent danger to the community where little existed. High school boys involved in a violent altercation were presented by news coverage as a unique youth phenomenon and a dangerous new type of gang, one that was savagely and randomly attacking community members. The coverage seems to have employed the classic myth of the violent teen, similar to the mods and rockers, as well as a deviancy amplification spiral.

== Later work ==
The group's alleged ringleader, Steven Gazlay, went on to have eight felony convictions by 2019. He was arrested in 2021 for allegedly defrauding a lender for more than $700,000 to fund a gambling spree.
