= List of moral panics =

This is a list of events that are argued to fit the sociological definition of a moral panic.

In sociology, a moral panic is a period of increased and widespread societal concern over some group or issue, in which the public reaction to such group or issue is disproportional to its actual threat. The concern is further fueled by mass media and moral entrepreneurs who promote or popularize the issue. Moral panics may result in legislative and/or long-lasting cultural changes in the societies where they occur.

The concept was first introduced into the field of sociology by Stanley Cohen in his 1972 book Folk Devils and Moral Panics and has since been expanded by other researchers. Moral panics as a group phenomenon are different from mass hysteria, which is closer to a psychological illness rather than a sociological phenomenon.

== 18th century and before ==
title	concern	causes	location	time	refs
Persecution of Christians in the Roman Empire	That Christianity was a threat to public order and religious traditions	Rejection of imperial cult, accusations of cannibalism and incest	Roman Empire	AD 64-313	
Blood libel	That Jews engage in the kidnapping and murder of gentile children	Antisemitism, accusations of kidnapping, murder, and conspiracy to kill children against Jews	Europe, Middle East	1100s-present	
Witch-hunts	That some individuals with supernatural powers, "witches", were causing harm to people in their communities	Unsubstantiated rumors and accusations of witchcraft	Europe, North America	Middle Ages to the 1700s	

== 19th century ==
title	concern	causes	location	time	refs
Anti-Catholic panic	That Catholics were conspiring against American interests	Increased immigration of Catholics to the United States, pre-existing anti-Catholic attitudes, political tension between the U.S. and European powers	United States	1840s, 1850s	
Garrotting panics	Robberies involving the practice of garroting	Media coverage of garroting robberies	United Kingdom, United States	1860s	
Dime novels panic	That dime novels were pushing the brains of younger people too much	Popularization of dime novels among the youth, increased media coverage among Puritans	United States	1870s–1890s	
White slavery scare	The prostitution of White women	Allegations regarding the prostitution of White women by private businesses, release of Traffic in Souls	United Kingdom, United States	1880s (UK), early 1900s (US)	

== 20th century ==
title	concern	causes	location	time	refs
Amusement park panic	That amusement parks were dangerous to young people and could injure or kill them	An increase of new amusement parks being built, news reports of young children being injured on rides	United States	1910s–1930s	
Comic book panic	That comic books were negatively influencing young people	Popularization of comic books among the youth, publication of Seduction of the Innocent	United States	1930s–1950s	
Sexual psychopath panic	Child sexual offending by "sexual psychopaths", a contested psychological category of sex offenders	Sensationalistic media coverage of child sex crimes	United States	1930s–1950s	
Homosexual panic	That homosexuals were trying to "promote homosexuality" to society, including children	Homophobia, increased visibility of homosexuals and queer rights movements	United States, United Kingdom	1950s–1990s	
Poisoned candy myths	That malevolent strangers were lacing Halloween candy with drugs, poison, or sharp objects such as razor blades	Social upheaval, greater racial integration, and improved status for women, reflected societal questions about who was trustworthy.	United States	1950s-1990s	
Lavender scare	That homosexuals were conspiring against American interests	Societal tensions during the Cold War, the belief that homosexuals were sympathetic toward the Soviet Union	United States	1950s	
Television panic	Addiction caused by minors watching television	Popularization of television among the youth, widespread fears around the product	Global	1946-1960s	
McCarthyism	Communist infiltration and subversion in the United States government, Hollywood, etc.	Red Scare during the Cold War	United States	1947–1959	
Mods and rockers panic	Hooligan activities by the two youth groups	Sensationalistic media coverage of the conflicts between the groups	United Kingdom	1960s	
War on drugs	Drug trafficking and consumption	Increase of drug consumption in society, media alarmism	Global	1970s–present	
Sex offender panic	Child sex crimes perpetrated by sex offenders and pedophiles	Reoccurrence of high-profile child sexual abuse scandals	United States, United Kingdom	1970s–present	
Overpopulation panic	That the world is overpopulated, has gone past the planet's carrying capacity and that birth rates are too high	Publication of The Population Bomb, increase of cases of falling birth rates, new development in countries across the world	Global	1970s–present	
Violent video games panic	That video games were influencing children into committing violent acts	Popularization of violent video games among the youth, discredited psychological theories about games	United States	1970s–1990s	
Mugging panic	Muggings in public streets, especially by young Black males	Media alarmism, 1973 Birmingham mugging attack	United Kingdom	1970s	
Satanic panic	That supposed Satanic cults were engaging in child sexual abuse rituals	Unsubstantiated Satanic ritual abuse rumors and allegations, tabloid journalism	United States	1980s	
Missing children panic	Child abduction by strangers in public places	Murder of Adam Walsh, media sensationalism	United States	1980s	
Dungeons & Dragons panic	That some RPG table-top games, especially D&D, were leading young people into drug use and Satanism	Popularization of mythical-themed role-play games, Christian and BADD activism, other controversies	United States	1980s	
Day-care sex-abuse hysteria	That some day-care centers were engaging in Satanic child sexual abuse	Increased usage of day-cares among employed women with young children	United States	1980s–1990s	
AIDS panic	AIDS dissemination, particularly by gay men	AIDS pandemic of the 1980s, Conservative activism	Global	1980s–1990s	
"Wilding" panic	Physical and sexual assaults in public streets by ethnic youth gangs	Rape of Trisha Meili, media sensationalism	United States	1989–1990s	
Dangerous dogs panic	Dog attacks against humans, especially by pit bulls	Sensationalistic media coverage of dog attacks	United Kingdom	late 1980s–1990s	
Michael Jackson allegations	That Michael Jackson was a child sexual abuser and potential pedophile	Evan Chandler filing a lawsuit against Jackson, Release of Leaving Neverland in 2019	United States, Canada, United Kingdom	1993, 2019–present	
Harry Potter panic	That the book series was leading children into witchcraft and occultism	The novels' themes of magic and witchcraft, anti-occult activism against the series	United States, United Kingdom, Canada, Australia	1990s–2000s	
Internet moral panic	The dissemination of legal and illegal pornography on the internet, online criminal activities	Popularization of the Internet, media sensationalism	Global	1990s–2000s; 2020s-present	
School shooting panic	School shootings	Increased media coverage of school shooting cases	United States	1990s–present	
Y2K bug panic	That the world would end on New Year's Day 2000 and computers would malfunction	Media alarmism	Global	1990s–2000	

== 21st century ==
title	concern	causes	location	time	refs
Islamic terrorism panic	Arab and Muslim terrorism	September 11 attacks	United States	Early 2000s	
Human trafficking panic	Sex trafficking and human trafficking	Reoccurrence of high-profile human- and sex-trafficking scandals	United States, United Kingdom, Australia	2000s–present	
Brain maturity and young adult capability	That young adults are incapable of making decisions, and that brains don't mature until the age of 25	Brain matures at 25 myth	Global	2000s–present	
MySpace panic	Potential concerns about cyberbullying and predators	Rise of the use of MySpace among teens, release of To Catch a Predator	Global	2005–2010	
Internet predator panic	Sexting between adults and minors on the internet	Popularization of social media among young people, misreadings of forensic statistics by mass media	Global	2000s	
Gender ideology panic	That LGBT activists were introducing children to "gender ideology" in schools	Increase of neo-Conservative activism in Latin America since the 1980s	Latin America	2000s–2010s	
2012 phenomenon	That transformative or catastrophic events would occur on or around December 21, 2012	Release of 2012 in 2009, spread of the rumor throughout the news and social media	Global	2000s–2012	
Knife crime panic	United Kingdom, and especially London, was experiencing a knife crime epidemic	Introduction of a new category of "knife-related crime", increase in knife-related crimes, over-reporting by media of knife killings	United Kingdom	2007–2008; 2018	
Going dark	That privacy tools such as end-to-end encryption shield cybercriminals, such as child predators, drug traffickers or terrorists, from law enforcement, thereby preventing them from accessing them	Increased adoption of cryptography, legislation in several countries attempting to limit privacy, anonymity and encryption, arrest and indictment of Pavel Durov in France on 24 August 2024	Global	Mid 2010s–present	
Blue Whale Challenge	A social media "game" consisting of fifty tasks for players to complete, gradually becoming more violent and ending in players being tasked to commit suicide	Death of Renata Kambolina, media reports that the game's administrators had caused at least two-hundred suicides	Russia, India, Bangladesh, Armenia, Brazil, Egypt	2016	
2016 clown sightings	Sightings of people dressed as "creepy clowns" in strange places, presumably with the intent to harm others	Media reports of people disguised as clowns	United States	2016	
Elsagate	That children could end up watching inappropriate content labeled as "for kids" on YouTube	Increase of "kids" channels featuring inappropriate or disturbing content	Global	2016–present	
Momo Challenge hoax	That an internet user named "Momo" was encouraging children online to harm or kill themselves	Internet hoax	Global	2018	
QAnon panic	That some politicians and celebrities engaged in Satanic child sexual abuse rituals	Conspiracy theories fueled by social media algorithms	United States	2010s	
Anti-LGBT panic	LGBT child grooming and genital mutilation of cisgender children by gender professionals	Increase in prevalence of LGBT children, unsubstantiated theories spread by anti-LGBT activists	United States, United Kingdom, Argentina, Brazil	2010s–present	
Fast food prices	That fast food prices are being overinflated and the quality of fast-food restaurants are decreasing	An increase of social media and news coverage of customers frustrated over the prices and economic inflation	Global	2010s–present	
Teen use of smartphones and social media	Depression, anxiety and suicide thought to be caused by use of social media and cell phones	Increasing use of cell phone ownership by teens; publication of The Anxious Generation by Haidt in 2024 which resulted in global age verification laws and social media bans	Global	2023–present	
Gentle parenting	That parents are not parenting their kids properly, leading children to lack discipline	Increasing media coverage of cases of permissive parenting, calling them gentle parenting instead	Global	2020s–present	
Blind boxes	That blind boxes are causing children to gamble and can be addictive	Increase of blind box production; Labubu toys	Global	2020s–present	
Needle spiking	People spiking others via hypodermic needle	Post-COVID-19 pandemic anxiety; reporting on social and legacy media	Europe	2021–2024	
Child safety on Roblox	Concern over the game exposing children to violent and sexual content as well as facilitating child sexual abuse.	An increase in news coverage covering cases of both violent and sexual content on the platform, child sexual abuse occurring through the platform, Schlep getting banned from Roblox	Global	2022/2023–present	
Brainrot	Children watching low-quality content with little to no educational value	A increase of mass media reports about "brainrot" and channels featuring such content	Global	2022/2023–present	
Artificial Intelligence	Use of artificial intelligence to replace workers, generate misinformation and possible existential risks from artificial superintelligence.	OpenAI releasing chatGPT in November 2022, instantly putting powerful text-generation into the hands of millions	Global	Mid 2010's–present	

== Sources ==
- Goode, E.; Ben-Yehuda, N. (2010). Moral Panics: The Social Construction of Deviance. Wiley. ISBN 978-1-4443-0793-1.
