= Deviancy amplification spiral =

Media hype phenomenon

In sociology, a deviancy amplification spiral occurs in societies or social environments when certain attempts to eradicate slightly deviant or criminal behavior by labeling and shaming it in a way that ultimately serves to further marginalize the people viewed as deviant, and cause them to engage in further deviance, thus intensifying social disapproval and perpetuating the cycle.

== Origin of term ==
The process of deviancy amplification was first described by Leslie T. Wilkins in his 1964 book, Social Deviancy, in which he argued that minor initial deviation can intensify into significant deviance if it is met with overreaction and moral panic.

== Process ==
According to sociologist Stanley Cohen, the spiral starts with some deviant act. Usually the deviance is criminal, but it can also involve lawful acts considered morally repugnant by a large segment of society. With the new focus on the issue, hidden or borderline examples that would not themselves have been newsworthy are reported, confirming the pattern. This confirmation of the pattern was first documented by Stanley Cohen in Folk Devils and Moral Panic, a study of the media response to clashes between the Mods and Rockers, two rival UK subcultures of the time.

Reported cases of such deviance are often presented as the potential "tip of the iceberg", implying the problem may be much more serious or widespread than is known from confirmed or validated cases. As a result, minor problems can begin to look serious and rare events begin to seem common. Members of the public are motivated to keep informed on these events, leading to high readership for the stories, feeding the spiral. The resulting publicity has the potential to increase the deviant behavior by glamorizing it, or by making it seem common or acceptable. In the next stage, public concern typically forces the police and the law enforcement system to focus more resources on dealing with the specific deviancy than it warrants.

Judges and magistrates then come under public pressure to deal out harsher sentences and politicians pass new laws to increase their popularity by giving the impression that they are dealing with the perceived threat. The responses by those in authority tend to reinforce the public's fear, while the media continue to report police and other law enforcement activity, amplifying the spiral.

The theory does not contend moral panics always include the deviancy amplification spiral.

Eileen Barker asserts the controversy surrounding certain new religious movements can turn violent in a deviancy amplification spiral. In his autobiography, Lincoln Steffens details how news reporting can be used to create the impression of a crime wave where there is none, in the chapter "I Make a Crime Wave".

Button and Tunley have also presented a theory that offers the opposite to deviancy amplification, which they call deviancy attenuation. In this phenomenon, they argue, illegal or morally repugnant acts are ignored or minimized. Fraud is one example they cite: Fraud is ignored or minimized and there are fewer resources dedicated to combating fraud, which leads to fewer investigations and prosecutions of fraud, which reinforces the belief of authorities that fraud is not a major problem.

== See also ==
- Availability heuristic
- Crowd psychology
- Culture of fear
- Folk devil
- List of moral panics
- Love Jihad
- Group sex
- Jenkem
- Junk food news
- Knockout game
- Mass hysteria
- Mass media
- Mean world syndrome
- Missing white woman syndrome
- Moral panic
- Rainbow party
- Representativeness heuristic
- Sensationalism
- Social control
- Yellow journalism
