= Folk Devils and Moral Panics =

1972 sociology book by Stanley Cohen

- Author: Stanley Cohen
- Publisher: Granada Publishing
- Publication date: 1972
- Pages: 224
- ISBN: 978-0415610162

Folk Devils and Moral Panics: The Creation of the Mods and Rockers is a 1972 sociology book by Stanley Cohen. It was the first book to define the social theory of moral panic.

== See also ==
- Folk devil
- Moral entrepreneur
- Mass psychogenic illness
