= Erich Goode =

American sociologist

Erich Goode is an American sociologist specializing in the sociology of deviance. He has written a number of books on the field in general, as well as on specific deviant topics. He was a professor at the State University of New York at Stony Brook.

== Biography ==
Goode received a B.A. from Oberlin College (1960) and a Ph.D. in sociology from Columbia University (1966). He has taught at Columbia University, New York University, Florida Atlantic University, the University of North Carolina at Chapel Hill, and Hebrew University in Jerusalem, Israel. He is currently professor emeritus at the State University of New York at Stony Brook. He also teaches at the University of Maryland.

Goode takes a constructionist approach to deviance. In his view, a behavior is deviant if and only if society at large considers it so. The broader social factors that go into the classification of a behavior as deviant are thus considered a valid subject of study. His research focuses on the deviant individuals (and behaviors) themselves, as well as the particular individuals and groups that play a part in classifying the behavior as deviant.

As a sociologist, Goode makes no judgment about whether a particular is "bad" or "evil", and considers deviance as a topic to be entirely dependent on whether the society at large considers the behavior deviant. In this view, a particular behavior can be deviant in one society, but normal in another. This is in contrast to the perspective of essentialism, which would say that a behavior either "really is" deviant or "really isn't", and that it is the task of the sociologist to discover and report on the truth of the matter, and what society at large believes is mostly irrelevant.

According to the constructionist framework as espoused by Goode, an instance of "deviance" can exist as a social construct exclusively, completely separate from any actual behavior. In other words, "imaginary deviance" can exist that causes a frenzy of interesting sociological behavior in response to a non-existence phenomenon. Satanic ritual abuse is an example of this in modern times, and the case of witch hunts is an example from antiquity. These are often called moral panics, and Goode considers them a valid subject (perhaps the ideal subject) for deviance studies.

Erich Goode is known for his exploration and exposure of the "moral panic" concept. He takes a "harm reductionist" approach to studying social deviance. This commitment aims to reduce social harm without engaging in value judgments or essentialist claims about those being studied.

Goode has encountered criticism within the sociological community after admitting in an article in 2002 to engaging in casual sex with participants to his 1980s study of the National Association for the Advancement of Fat Acceptance, or NAAFA. Such behavior is generally considered unethical for researchers. Critics argue that Goode's position as an investigator took advantage of the women involved in his work.

== Goode's four types of drug use ==
1. Legal instrumental use - Taking prescribed drugs and over the counter drugs to relieve or treat symptoms.

2. Legal recreational use - Using legal (tobacco, alcohol, caffeine) drugs to achieve a certain mental state.

3. Illegal instrumental use - Taking non-prescription drugs to accomplish a task or goal.

4. Illegal recreational use - Taking illegal drugs for fun or pleasure to experience euphoria.

== Books ==
Marijuana (1969) seeks to bring to the reader the whole configuration of this mushrooming problem, which, like the Sexual Revolution and the New Politics, lies at the heart of the alienation felt by many young people and the fears of social breakdown voiced by many of their elders. Atherton Press, Library of Congress Catalog Card Number 68–56981

In The Marijuana Smokers (1971), Goode looked at marijuana through a sociological lens.

In Drugs in American Society, Goode argued that the effect of a drug is dependent on the societal context in which it is taken. Thus, in one society (or social context) a particular drug may be a depressant, and in another it may be a stimulant.

Deviant Behavior is a textbook intended for undergrad students. In it, Goode takes the position of a weak constructionist.

Moral Panics: The Social Construction of Deviance, written with Nachman Ben-Yehuda, is a book about moral panics, from a sociological perspective.

In Paranormal Beliefs: A Sociological Introduction (1999), Goode studies paranormal beliefs such as UFOs, ESP, and creationism using the methods of the sociology of deviance. Consistent in tone with the rest of his works, he takes the position that whether the phenomenon in question is real is not important to a sociologist. Rather, sociologists should be concerned with how the paranormalist is labeled as deviant, and what effect the label has on them and society.
