= Leslie T. Wilkins =

British criminologist (1915–2000)

Philosophical work
- Institutions: University of California, Berkeley; Home Office; United Nations; State University of New York, Albany
- Main interests: criminology, social deviance, operational research
- Notable ideas: deviancy amplification spiral

Leslie Thomas Wilkins (3 March 1915 – 6 May 2000) was a British criminologist and statistician, best known for theories of the deviancy amplification spiral, contributing to the development of sentencing guidelines and the "Mannheim-Wilkins scale" used in parole processes.

== Career ==
Wilkins started his research career in the 1940s with the Air Ministry and the Wartime Social Survey. In collaboration with Professor of Criminology at the London School of Economics, Hermann Mannheim, Wilkins published the first Home Office research study (Prediction Methods in relation to borstal training, 1955) before being appointed as the first Deputy Director of the Home Office Research Unit. He subsequently worked for the United Nations in the Far East (1964-66).

He moved to the University of California, Berkeley (1966-69) where he became acting dean of the School of Criminology. After his resignation he moved on to the School of Criminal Justice at the State University of New York, Albany (1969-82) and was named Professor Emeritus (1981). He returned to the UK (1982) and continued writing many books and articles on criminology until his death.

Wilkins had a significant impact on a generation of international criminologists (including Stanley Cohen), was a founding member of the British Society of Criminology, an editor of the Howard Journal of Crime and Justice, and worked with Stafford Beer's company, SIGMA, in the 1960s.

== See also ==
- deviancy amplification spiral
- British Society of Criminology
- Stafford Beer
