= Media panic =

Emotional discourse related to media technologies

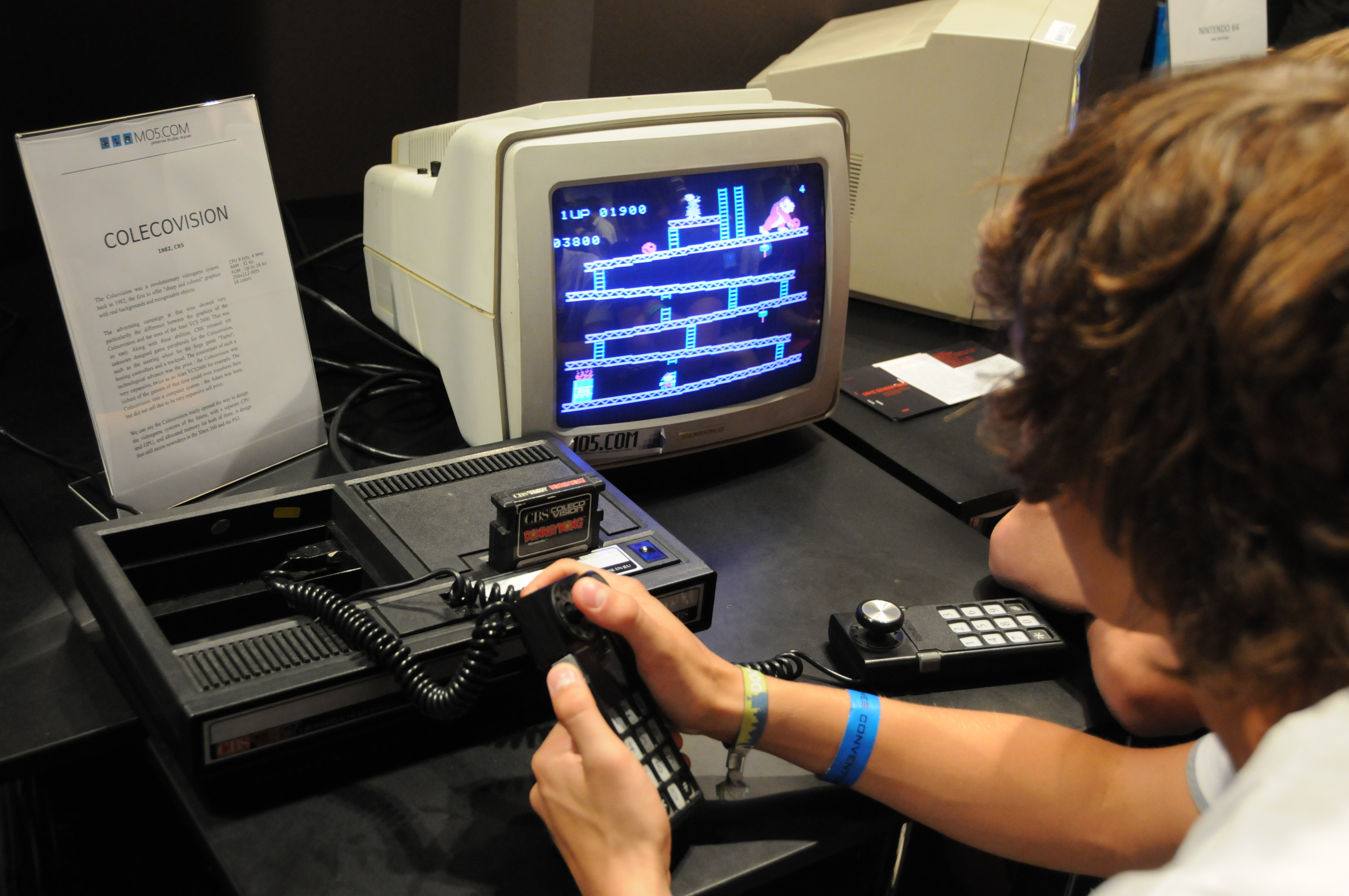
Many adults have been worried about the impact violent video games could have on youth.

The term "media panic" refers to the highly emotionally charged discourse surrounding the emergence of new media technology, such as the Internet, computer games or social media that is feared threaten society and its values. It can be considered a specification of the wider concept of "moral panic".

== Definition ==
The term "media panic" was coined by Danish media scholar Kirsten Drotner. She identifies several key characteristics of media panic:

- The media is both the initiator and disseminator of the discussion.
- The discussion is highly emotionally charged and morally polarizing (the medium either 'good' or 'bad'), those who oppose it tend to be the most vocal.
- Concerns tend to centre around potential effects on children and the young and their perceived vulnerability to its influence (mass media bias).
- Advocates ('moral entrepreneurs') tend to be representatives of certain groups (religious, professional, political, socio-economic) and have vested interests in the discussion, often deliberately framing youth as victims.
- According to John Springhall, media panics are often not strictly concerned by the nature of juvenile misbehaviour but instead become scapegoats for more general adult anxieties – fear of the future, of technological change and the erosion of moral absolutes. "Attacks on the influence of the media thereby act to conceal social uncertainties."

== Manifestation ==
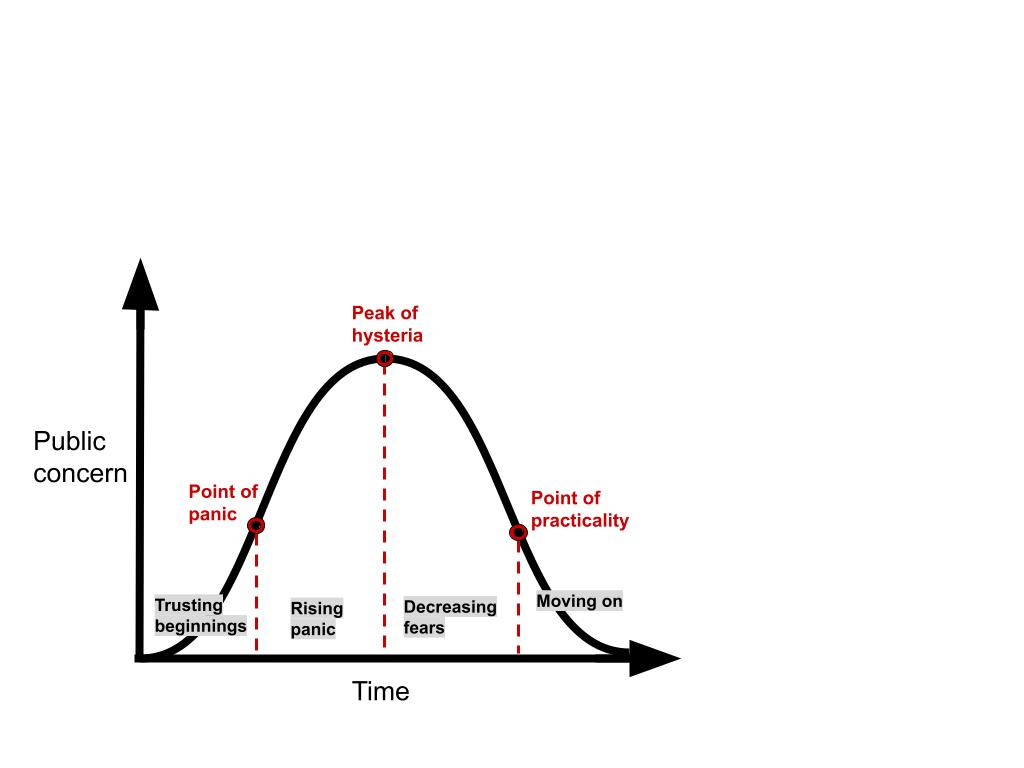
Media Panic Cycle Diagram

Over the last several hundred years there have been numerous examples of sudden short-lived bouts of public concern at the introduction of new media technologies. All of which have followed a distinctly similar progression. This process is seen as “cyclical and unchanging”, old media become acceptable and fade into the background and are replaced by new media and scapegoated in the same way. Media outlets may exaggerate the severity or likelihood of a threat that the new medium or media technology poses in order to capture attention and drive ratings. They may oversimply complex and nuanced issues -- presenting tenuous links as profound or inevitable, leading to misunderstandings and misconceptions by the public.

== History ==
Media panic has a long history, going back even as far as Ancient Greece with Socrates condemning the written word: “if men learn this they implant forgetfulness into their souls”.

=== Comic book censorship ===
In the 1950s Psychiatrist Dr. Fredric Wertham made largely unfounded claims that so-called “crime comics” indoctrinated children into a life of violence and delinquency. In his book "Seduction of the Innocent" he linked these American comics to juvenile crime, as well as the promotion of homosexual lifestyles (Batman and Robin) and unfeminine activities (Wonder Woman). These assertions particularly appealed to middle-class parents causing an uproar of concern for their children.

This media panic had substantial and long-lasting impacts including the formation of the Comics Code Authority which drastically limited the type of content that could be published. Many in the industry were forced to leave the profession and the content that remained was far tamer.

=== Horror films ===
In the 1980s, Video Nasties, often low-budget horror films, became the subject of media panic. The Daily Mail started a campaign of front-page headlines: “Ban video sadism now”, described the “Rape of our children's minds”, and in a story headed “‘Taken over’ by something evil from the TV set”, suggested that a boy had been possessed by one such film. This highly emotive coverage stirred up a frenzy among the general public which led to the Video Recordings Act being passed in 1984. This gave statutory power to the British Board of Film Classification, the act made it illegal to sell or supply a video that the board hadn’t examined and classified.

=== Smartphones and social media ===
Social media is the most recent technological shift in the way we consume media. This shift has been met with concern surrounding the impacts of social media usage on teenagers. The NYC Mayor Eric Adams once classified “unfettered access to and use of social media” as a public health crisis and accused companies like TikTok of “monetising our children's privacy and jepoardising their mental health” by including “addictive and dangerous features” in the design of their platform.

Unlike other examples, social media has the capability to produce virtually unlimited supply of potential threats. Curtis Puryeara also explains how virality is a key factor in how users classify potential threats through the Social Amplification Model of Moral Panics on Social Media. We have evolved to detect threats, but we must then identify which warrant a response. We rarely consider them in isolation and often look to others for information. The combination of virality metrics (e.g. number of shares) and threatening content may act as a heuristic for users when trying to evaluate the perceived danger of a threat as it indicates that others consider the threat worth their attention.

== Criticisms and possible solutions ==
Media outlets and social networking sites must be held accountable for the information they are publishing by regulatory bodies to ensure balanced and well-founded coverage. For example, through fact-checking, this is of particular importance on social media given the recent emergence of generative AI technology, to prevent the dissemination of dis- and misinformation. Sensationalism should be avoided to prevent an exaggerated sense of threat from forming.

The provision of media literacy education in schools, the workplace, and society can help individuals to navigate modern media, giving them the tools and skills to scrutinise the legitimacy of sources and discern credible information from misinformation.

== See also ==
- Alarmism
- Hostile media effect
- Media bias
- Sensationalism
- Vicarious trauma after viewing media
