= Linda Calvey =

British author and murderer (born 1948)

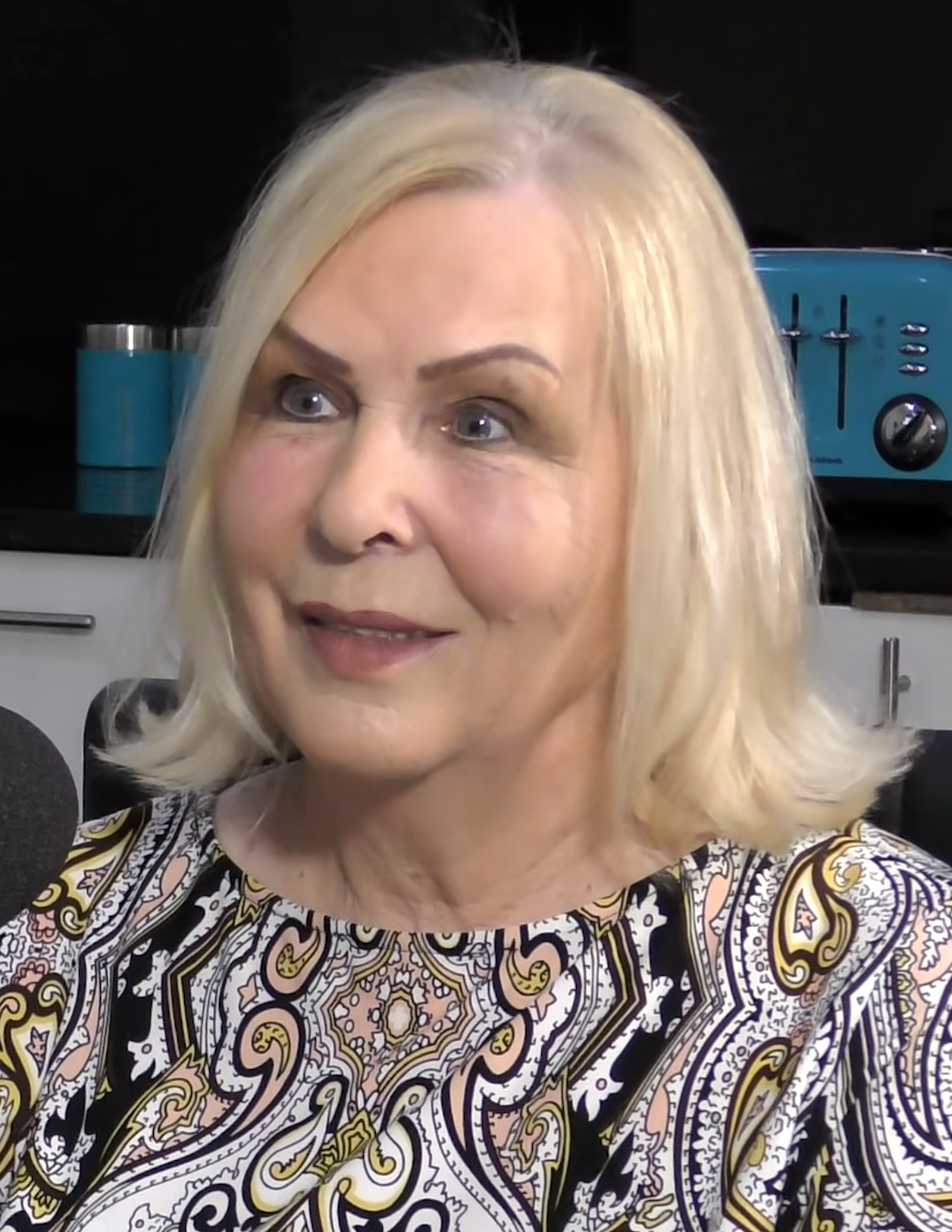
- Calvey in 2021
- Born: Linda E P Welford; 8 April 1948 (age 78); Ilford, Essex, UK
- Other name: The Black Widow
- Occupation: Author
- Spouse(s): Mickey Calvey (died 1978); Daniel Reece (divorced); George Caeser (died 2015)
- Children: 2
- Status: On licence
- Criminal charges: Multiple robbery offences (1986); murder (1991)
- Penalty: Seven years imprisonment (for robbery); life imprisonment (for murder)

Linda Calvey (born Linda E P Welford, 8 April 1948) is an English convicted murderer and author. She was convicted of a number of armed robberies in the 1980s. In 1990 she murdered her lover Ronnie Cook and was sentenced to life imprisonment in November 1991, of which she served 18 years. She was known as the "Black Widow" because all of her lovers ended up either dead or in prison.

== Early life ==
Calvey worked as a receptionist at a paint factory while a teenager.

== Previous criminal career ==
Calvey began her criminal career as a lookout after being invited by her cousin to a party for armed robber Mickey Calvey, who at the time was on temporary home leave towards the end of his eight-year prison term, where she fell in love with him. She married him at 22 years old, with him having to be brought to the wedding from his prison by armed guard. She later became a getaway driver and eventually wielded guns herself during robberies. She went on to make £1 million in robberies, saying in 2002: "I loved the buzz of picking up a shotgun, confronting men in armoured vans and forcing them to hand over vast sums of money." She later said she always thought that the money was "rightfully hers". She was known to keep guns under her doormat.

Her first conviction in 1986 resulted in her being sentenced to seven years imprisonment, of which she served about three years, half her sentence. Most of her sentence was served at HM Prison Holloway. As part of a criminal gang she had helped in a series of post office robberies, in which staff and customers were sprayed with dangerous ammonia. The judge commented in his sentencing remarks:

This is an amazingly horrifying case. It must be the worst case ever heard in front of a British court. These robberies were carefully planned and organised, they were skilfully, effectively and ruthlessly carried out.

Calvey's brother Anthony Welford had allowed his house to be used as a base by the gang and was himself jailed for nine years for conspiracy to rob the post offices.

== Meeting Ronnie Cook and Daniel Reece ==
Calvey met Ronnie Cook after the death of her husband Mickey. He was one of Mickey's associates before his death, and provided money to Calvey to support her after Mickey's death. According to Calvey, Cook soon became controlling, having say over what she wore and trailing her when she went out with friends. After Calvey declined Cook's marriage proposal, she said he threatened to hurt her son. Cook was sentenced to 16 years in prison for taking part in an armed robbery at some point after.

Calvey was introduced to Daniel Reece by a friend of Cook, Brian Thorogood, who thought Reece could use the support after Reece's son had been killed in a traffic accident while Reece was in prison. The friendship between the two then developed into a relationship. She also then cheated on Cook with Thorogood.

=== Murder of Ronnie Cook ===
In late 1990, around 18 months after being paroled from her armed robbery sentence, Calvey paid criminal associate Daniel Reece £10,000 to kill Ronnie Cook. However, he lost his nerve at the last minute and Calvey picked up the gun herself, shooting the victim at point blank range, whilst he knelt in front of her. He suffered horrific and fatal injuries to the head on the second shot; the blast also broke his neck. A neighbour had heard Calvey shout "kneel" before a shot rang out. The allegation that Calvey had killed Cook was supported by Reece, as well as gangster Frankie Fraser, who said Calvey did it so Cook would not find out she had been spending some of his money. At Calvey's trial, the prosecuting attorney said Cook's motive was to "simplify the rather dangerous and complex” state of her personal affairs — referring to her romances with Reece and Thorogood. Cook was due for full release from prison at the time and so would soon have discovered how Calvey, on whom he had lavished gifts and money, had cheated on him and become the lover of Reece and Thorogood. He also would have found that she had spent the cash he had entrusted to her. Reece testified to police: "I couldn't kill him. I shot to his side. I froze. Linda took the gun from me. She shot him in the head." The claim that he had shot him to his side first was supported by the fact that Cook was found to have a bullet wound to the arm. Calvey's footprints were also found next to the body, indicating she was present in the room at the shooting. On the day of the murder, Calvey had driven to HM Prison Maidstone to pick up Cook, who was on day release at the end of his sentence, and took him to her home, knowing a gunman would be there to murder him. He was shot only about half an hour after he had been collected by Calvey from the prison.

At trial Calvey denied murder, saying the man she had cheated on and who was supposedly abusive to her had "meant everything to her" and she could not have killed him. However, the jury did not believe Calvey and found her guilty of murder. She showed no reaction when the jury announced their guilty verdict.

Calvey was convicted of murder and sentenced to eighteen and a half years in prison. During her imprisonment in 1995 a tribute was written to her by Charles Bronson, considered Britain's most violent prisoner, with Bronson saying that she was "a true lady, a real east London girl". Calvey herself sent a floral tribute to the funeral of gangster Ronnie Kray alongside her fellow inmate and criminal associate Tina Molloy, who was imprisoned aged 17 for the murder of Edna Phillips in 1992 soon after the infamous murder of James Bulger. Calvey and Molloy's tribute read: "To Ron, with love and affection from Linda Calvey, Tina Molloy, and the girls of H-wing".

In 2002, a book by Kate Kray detailing Calvey's life and crimes was published.

=== Calvey's claims ===
Calvey denied murdering Cook despite being found guilty. First she attempted to blame a stranger hitman, saying she ran from the house screaming as she saw this mystery assassin shoot Cook in the kitchen. She claimed that, after they got home, "the door burst open and a man shouted, 'Get down. Police!'" before shooting him. The People newspaper described her story in 2000 as "cynical and self-serving" and said that "no-one" believed her story. In 2002 Calvey repeated this claim while represented legally by controversial fake lawyer and criminal Giovanni Di Stefano, who infamously defended Saddam Hussein and Slobodan Milošević and who is now banned from working in law in the UK. In 2013, Di Stefano made headlines by proudly declaring he would have represented Hitler if he had had the chance. Under Di Stefano's representation Calvey appealed to the Criminal Cases Review Commission, but they were unconvinced and rejected her appeal.

Calvey has since changed her story and now claims that when she picked up Cook and arrived home, Reece snuck in and shot him, claiming it was to avenge Mickey (as Cook had been a participant in the botched robbery that resulted in Mickey's death and alleged Cook knowingly put him in danger) and to protect Calvey's son. She also claimed that police had conducted gunshot residue tests on both her face and hands and eliminated her as a suspect, but returned a few days later, interviewed, and arrested her. In 2022, She was interviewed by UNILAD and stated the same thing: "I picked him (Cook) up, we went to my home and as we walked into my house, the door got kicked in and a gunman ran in and he (Cook) was shot dead. And when they (police) knew who I was, they then charged me with the murder." By this time she was no longer married to Reece, who as of 2017 was himself still imprisoned, with Calvey having married for a third time in 2008.

However, according to Kate Kray, the partner of infamous gangster Ronnie Kray, hardly any convicted gangsters like Calvey regard themselves as guilty, and so it is not surprising that Calvey claims she is innocent. Furthermore, despite claiming that Reece killed Cook, she later married Reece at HM Prison Durham in 1995. Reece's best man at the wedding was Mike Martin, the lover of Suzanne Capper torturer and murderer Bernadette McNeilly. Some of Calvey's guests were IRA terrorists Ella O'Dwyer and Martina Anderson. Calvey insisted in 2019 she is "different from the woman I was 30 years ago". Around this time she published a book about her life with the support of her family, one of whom – brother Anthony – had himself been imprisoned with her for housing Calvey's robbery gang.

== Personal life ==
Calvey has been married three times. Her first husband, Mickey Calvey, was an armed robber who died after being shot by police during a botched robbery on 9 December 1978. She was then briefly married to Danny Reece, the hitman she allegedly hired to kill Ronnie Cook, although Calvey has always denied it. Their marriage took place at HM Prison Durham. Her third marriage, to millionaire George Caesar, occurred in Dymchurch on 4 April 2009. He died in September 2015.

Calvey has two children with her first husband Mickey Calvey named Neil and Melanie, as well as several grandchildren and great-grandchildren.

== See also ==
- Dena Thompson – English female murderer also nicknamed "The Black Widow"
- Ernest Barrie – British man who protested his innocence of a crime and was released after a campaign, but went on to kill a man
