= Jenkem =

Purported inhalant drug

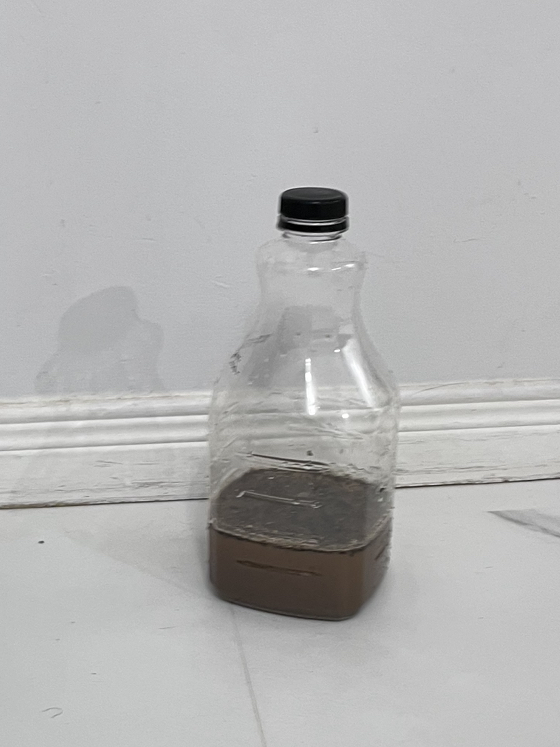
A bottle of Jenkem, which has been fermented for a period of 30 days.

Jenkem is an inhalant and hallucinogen created from fermented human waste. In the mid-1990s, it was reported to be a popular street drug among Zambian youth, created by placing feces and urine in a bottle or a bucket, sealing it with a balloon or lid and leaving it to ferment in the sun; afterwards they would inhale the gases generated.

In November 2007, there was a rash of interest in the United States after widespread reports of Jenkem becoming a popular recreational drug in middle and high schools across the country. The response to jenkem claims has been described as a moral panic, though the validity of the original claim has since been called into question. Several sources reported the increase in American media coverage was based on a hoax and on faulty Internet research.

== Description ==
The name derives from Genkem, a brand of glue which had "become the generic name for all the glues used by glue-sniffing children" in South Africa, where the drug originated and is most popular on the African continent as of 2000. In the book Children of AIDS: Africa's Orphan Crisis by Emma Guest, the making of jenkem is described: "fermented human sewage, scraped from pipes and stored in plastic bags for a week or so, until it gives off numbing, intoxicating fumes." The process is similarly described in a 1995 Inter Press Service report: "Human excreta is scooped up from the edges of the sewer ponds in old cans and containers which are covered with a polyethylene bag and left to stew or ferment for a week." A 1999 BBC article refers to "the dark brown sludge, gathering up fistfuls and stuffing it into small plastic bottles. They tap the bottles on the ground, taking care to leave enough room for methane to form at the top."

The effects of jenkem inhalation supposedly last for around an hour and consist of auditory and visual hallucinations for some users. In 1995, one user told a reporter it is "more potent than cannabis." A 1999 report interviewed a user, who said, "With glue, I just hear voices in my head. But with jenkem, I see visions. I see my mother who is dead and I forget about the problems in my life." Fumito Ichinose, an anesthesia specialist from Boston who conducted a study on the effects of hydrogen sulfide gas, or "sewer gas," on mice, informed Salon.com that holding one's breath, choking, or "the inhalation of gases like those produced from jenkem could result in hypoxia, a lack of oxygen flow to the body that could be alternately euphoric and physically dangerous."

== Media reports ==
=== 1995–2006 ===
The second media description of jenkem came from an Inter Press Service wire report in 1995. According to a 1998 report in The New York Times, Fountain of Hope, a non-profit organization, said that jenkem was used by street children in Lusaka, Zambia, to obtain a "powerful high". In 2002, Project Concern International Zambia and Fountain of Hope released a report entitled "Rapid Assessment of Street Children In Lusaka", where jenkem is listed as the third most popular drug among Lusaka's street children, following Dagga (Cannabis) and "glue and Dagga" but ahead of "Ballan" (uncured tobacco) and petrol. John C. Zulu, director of the Ministry of Sport, Youth and Child Development in Zambia, said in November 2007 that jenkem usage is less common than glue-sniffing and, "Initially, they used to get it from the sewer, but they make it anywhere ... They say it keeps them warm and makes them fearless." In 1999, BBC News ran a story about jenkem. In 2004, South African weekly investigative newspaper Mail & Guardian mentioned jenkem abuse in a report on Zambia's street children.

=== 2007 to present ===
On September 26, 2007, the Sheriff's Department of Collier County, Florida issued an internal bulletin about jenkem based on a TOTSE internet forum post by user "Pickwick", which included purported photos of the manufacture and use. "Pickwick" confessed it was a hoax around the time of the internal bulletin. In November of that year, officials at the Drug Enforcement Administration said no reports of jenkem use had been confirmed in the United States.

After initially classifying stories of Western jenkem use as "undetermined", Snopes quickly reclassified it as "false". About.com also concluded reports were "based on faulty Internet research". The Smoking Gun stated the Collier County alert "may be full of shit". Drug research site Erowid reported, "the jenkem stories that have been circulating in the U.S. media are almost certainly the strange result of a hoax."

Jenkem use was reported uncritically by KIMT of Mason City, Iowa, WIFR-TV in Rockford, Illinois, and WINK NEWS Fort Myers, Florida. The Washington Post columnist Emil Steiner reported that "a spokesman for the Drug Enforcement Administration (DEA) insists that 'there are people in America trying [jenkem],'" which the DEA agent characterized as "dangerous, bad and stupid." Fox News ran the story after the Steiner The Washington Post column, mentioning Pickwick's hoax and retraction. In the same article, a Washington D.C. DEA spokesman, Garrison Courtney, specified that, "We wouldn't classify it as a drug so much because it's feces and urine." UK technology tabloid website The Register concluded that "the jury's out." ABC News interviewed DEA spokesman Garrison Courtney, who stated that, "It is in Africa, we know that... We've heard rumors and speculation about it here, but part of looking for trends is listening first for speculation. It is something we want to keep on top of."

Journalist Kyle Magistrado from WSBT-TV in South Bend, Indiana advised parents to "wait up for [their children] at night and not let their kids go to bed until they have seen them and smelled their breath." They also advised parents to check their toilets, and look for any bottles with dark contents. Austin, Texas NBC affiliate KXAN-TV interviewed an addiction counselor, who speculated on its use: "Once it becomes OK with a certain group of adolescents, it becomes OK with a lot more." Australian broadcaster Ninemsn summarized American news reports. A syndicated report published on the web pages of CBS affiliate CBS-47 and Fox affiliate Fox 30, both in Jacksonville, Florida, reported on jenkem and also referred to it by the slang term "butt hash", citing media reports from The Washington Post, the Drudge Report, and Inside Edition. This was also followed up by a Fox 30 televised news segment, in which Captain Tim Guerrette of the Collier County Sheriff's department was interviewed. A Florida syndicated newspaper article focused on the leaked police memo and included interviews with DEA spokesman Rusty Payne, the Palmetto Ridge High School principal, and a spokeswoman for the Collier County Health Department.

Jamie Pietras of the Salon website published a long piece on jenkem in 2007. Pietras interviewed a Zambian government official on ways to curtail use and also focused on the Western media scare. Pietras interviewed researcher Earth Erowid of Erowid, and Jag Davies, the communications director for the Multidisciplinary Association for Psychedelic Studies (MAPS), neither of whom could provide any confirmation of its use in America. Partnership for a Drug-Free America public affairs representative Candice Besson also stated that PDFA had not previously heard about the drug.

The Enterprise Ledger of Enterprise, Alabama, quoted a local narcotics investigator who believed it was being used in Coffee County, Alabama. A commentary in The Times-Reporter of Dover-New Philadelphia, Ohio, said jenkem was "largely debunked", but that "someone will be stupid enough to try it." The story was also covered with varying degrees of skepticism in the Orange County Register, Evansville, Indiana, Fox affiliate WTVW, and Wichita, Kansas, CBS affiliate KWCH-TV.

In 2009, Bettendorf, Iowa, amended its city ordinance regarding illegal inhalants to include organic substances. In 2010, an apartment building in Fort Pierce, Florida, was condemned after police found leaking containers of human waste in a unit. One police official speculated the tenant was manufacturing jenkem.

== See also ==
- Bananadine
- Deviancy amplification spiral
- Psychoactive toad
- Whoonga
- Lant
