= Centennial High School (Las Vegas) =

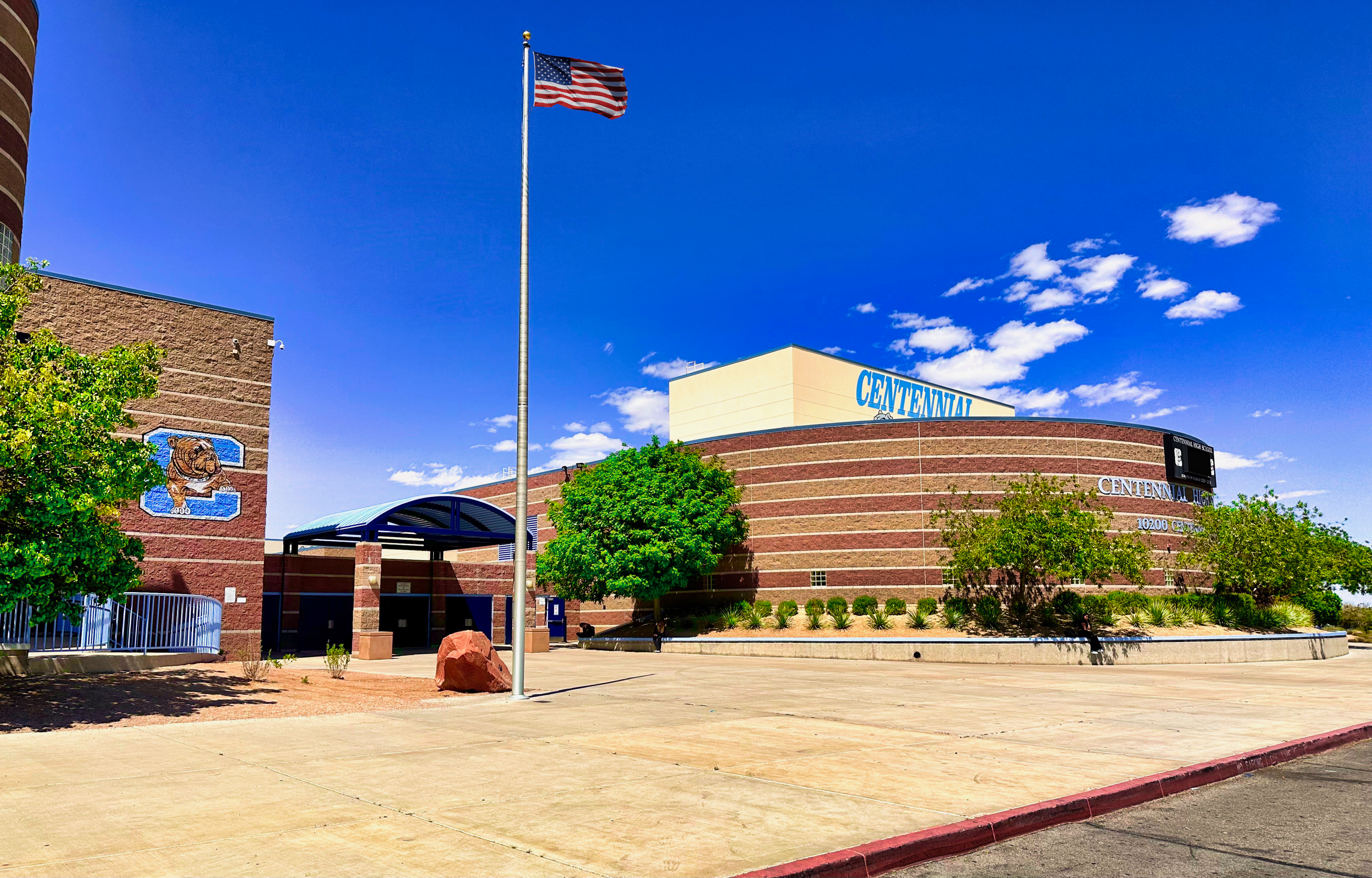
- Centennial High School

Location
- 10200 Centennial Pkwy; Las Vegas, Nevada 89149; United States; 36.278°N 115.319°W

Information
- Type: Public
- Established: 1999
- School district: Clark County School District
- Principal: Keith Wipperman
- Teaching staff: 105.00 (on FTE basis)
- Grades: 9 to 12
- Enrollment: 2,988 (2023-2024)
- Student to teacher ratio: 28.46
- Colors: Carolina Blue, Navy Blue and White
- Athletics conference: Sunset 4A Region – Northwest Division
- Mascot: Bulldog
- Nickname: Home of the Bulldogs
- Website: www.centennialhighschool.org

Centennial High School is a public secondary school located in unincorporated Clark County, Nevada, United States, in Las Vegas. The school serves about 3000 students in grades 9 to 12 in the Clark County School District.

In 2000, the movie Pay It Forward was filmed at Centennial High.

The school gained notoriety when it was learned that the 311 Boyz attended school there. The youths were heavily influenced by the Bumfights series.

== Extracurricular activities ==
=== NJROTC ===
In 2007, the Centennial High School Naval Junior Reserve Officers' Training Corps (NJROTC) unit was rated the most outstanding in the nation by The Navy League.

In 2001 and 2008, the Centennial High School NJROTC unit won 3rd overall in the nation at the Navy Nationals Championship in Pensacola, Florida. The 2014-2015 school year the Centennial High School NJROTC won 3rd overall and 1st in the nation for their Color Guard. The 2015-2016 school year at Navy Nationals, Centennial took home 4th in the nation and 3rd in the nation for Color Guard. Also in the 2015-2016 school year, Centennial High School NJROTC was awarded Overall Best Unit from the Area 13 Commander.

Centennial High School NJROTC unit has won the Navy Nationals competition twice in its history, by both the largest margin (200 points, 2009) and subsequently the smallest margin (3 points, 2010).

=== Singers ===
In 2007 the Centennial High School Chamber Singers sang at the 2007 ACDA National Convention in Miami, Florida.

=== Athletics ===
The Centennial boys volleyball team from 2003 under head coach David Fish went undefeated (23-0) and had three of its players go on to play at the division 1 collegiate level at Brigham Young University.

Centennial High School has had 13 state championship teams in the 2008-2009 school year: men's cross-country, women's basketball, women's soccer, and women's softball.

Centennial High School is also well known for having one of the best track and field programs in the state. Head coach Roy Sessions has led the women's team to 13 state wins.

==== Nevada Interscholastic Activities Association State Championships ====
- Volleyball (Boys) - 2003, 2018, 2019
- Basketball (Girls) – 2002, 2003, 2004, 2005, 2009, 2011, 2015, 2016, 2017, 2018, 2019, 2020, 2025
- Cross Country (Boys) – 2008, 2010, 2012, 2013
- Cross Country (Girls) – 2000
- Cheer leading - 2010
- Soccer (Girls) – 2003, 2005, 2008, 2009
- Softball - 2004, 2009, 2012
- Track and Field (Girls) – 2002, 2011, 2012, 2013, 2014, 2015, 2016, 2017, 2018, 2019, 2021, 2022, 2024, 2025
- Track and Field (Boys) - 2012, 2013, 2015
- Bowling (Boys)- 2011, 2013, 2014
- Bowling (Girls) - 2016
- Science Olympiad- 2012, 2014
- Baseball (Boys) Bryce Massanari

== Notable alumni ==
- Troy Brown Jr. (born 1999), NBA player for the Los Angeles Lakers
- Aaron Fotheringham (born 1991), extreme wheelchair athlete and the first person to land a backflip in a wheelchair
- Nehemiah Kauffman (c.1996–2016), victim of unsolved shooting
- Jonah Laulu (born 2000), NFL defensive tackle for the Indianapolis Colts
- Italee Lucas (born 1989), selected 21st overall by the Tulsa Shock in the 2011 WNBA draft
- Alex Marshall (born 1989), piano/guitarist for the band The Cab
- Tommy Pham (born 1988), major league baseball outfielder
- Tasha Schwikert (born 1984), member of the 2000 U.S. Olympic team in gymnastics NCAA champion, and six-time national champion
- Rhamondre Stevenson (born 1998), NFL player

== Feeder schools ==
- Eileen Conners Elementary School
- Edith Garehime Elementary School
- Shiela R. Tarr Academy of International Studies Elementary School
- Marc Kahre Elementary School
- Dorothy Eisenberg Elementary School
- Ruthe Duskin Elementary School
- Dean Lamar Allen Elementary School
- Marshall C. Darnell Elementary School
- Kenneth Divich Elementary School
- Henry & Evelyn Bozarth Elementary School
- Justice Myron E. Leavitt Middle School
- Edmundo “Eddie” Escobedo Senior Middle School
- Irwin & Susan Molasky Junior High School
