= Murder of Edna Phillips =

1992 murder in Penywaun, Wales

Edna Phillips was a 70-year-old woman who was murdered on 16 July 1992 by two teenage girls, one of them her next-door neighbour, at her home on a council estate in Penywaun in South Wales. The details of the crime were made public soon after the start of the trial of the two boys who murdered two-year-old James Bulger in Merseyside, which contributed to the resulting moral panic in the United Kingdom.

== Background and murder ==
Phillips lived on the Penywaun council estate, which had become increasingly dangerous since unemployment increased in the Cynon Valley and the local police station was closed as a cost-saving measure. The Rossi family moved into the house next door when their daughter, Maria, was a toddler. Phillips took Maria for walks when she was little, but later made complaints about loud music and drunkenness at the Rossi house, and reported Maria to the police; after that the Rossis despised her, rubbish was dumped in her garden, and Maria threw stones at her, called her a "fucking bitch" in the street, smeared feces on her house and committed other vandalism, stole her money, and mistreated her dog, Chum. In 1987, Phillips began asking to be moved to another house, but her request was not granted. In 1992, after Maria burgled her house, she wrote to her MP, Ann Clwyd; the police then put her in touch with Victims' Services and installed a burglar alarm, and a deputy divisional commander wrote to Clwyd that "All matters raised within the letter [had] been satisfactorily addressed."

Late in the evening of 16 July 1992, under the influences of cider and drugs, Maria Rossi and her friend, Christina "Tina" Molloy, both 17, saw Phillips, who was then 70 and partially sighted, calling for Chum to come in; they forced her back into her house, where they strangled her with the dog's chain, slashed her 35 times in the face with a utility knife, scissors and a piece of broken glass, stabbed her 86 times and stamped on her chest, breaking five ribs, broke her nose and attempted to scalp her, and broke eggs over her body. They stole her vacuum cleaner, radio and her money. The next morning Maria was heard singing "Ding, dong, Edna's dead" or "We've killed Edna".

== Trial verdict and public reactions ==
A crowd of 300 people attacked the Rossi house after discovery of the murder, throwing stones, destroying a greenhouse belonging to Rossi's grandparents and uprooting the plants. 'Murderer' was painted on the house and Molloy's parents' house was also wrecked; both families had to be taken to safety and their new addresses kept secret.

On 8 March 1993, both Rossi, who had previous convictions for theft and drug offenses, and Molloy, who had two previous convictions for assault and criminal damage, were given indefinite sentences. In sentencing, Judge Baker described them as "evil products of a modern age" and said: "If as youngsters some discipline had been imposed upon you, whether in the home, at school or through the courts, you might not be standing in the dock for this dreadful offense."

Details of the crime were first made public at the sentencing, which followed by less than three weeks the start of the trial of two ten-year-old boys for murdering two-year-old James Bulger. It contributed to a moral panic in the UK concerning young killers, who, the sociologist Colin Hay said in a 1995 article, were particularly disturbing since they did not constitute a clear "folk devil".

== Appeal and reduction in sentence ==
Molloy and Rossi were sentenced to a 'tariff' (minimum term) of 15 years. In April 1999 the Home Secretary, Jack Straw, reduced Rossi's to 13 years, but the Lord Chief Justice, Lord Woolf, refused to reduce it further, while reducing Molloy's to 12 years. In a case brought on behalf of Rossi and of Anthony Dudson, who was 16 when he participated in the murder of Suzanne Capper in Manchester in December 1992, the High Court ruled that the Home Secretary must regularly review all sentences of those in prison for murders committed when they were juveniles; this ruling was affirmed in February 2004 over the objections of the then Home Secretary, David Blunkett. Rossi was then known as Maria Smith. Rossi was released in 2010. People in Penywaun warned that neither of them would be welcome to return.

Christina Molloy was found dead in her house in Cambridgeshire in May 2017. Since her release she had struggled with alcohol and drug addiction, which led to her death.

== See also ==
- Sharon Carr – Britain's youngest female murderer, killed an adult woman when aged 12 in 1992
- Lorraine Thorpe – Britain's youngest female double murderer, tortured and killed two adults in 2009
