= Bananadine =

Fictional drug

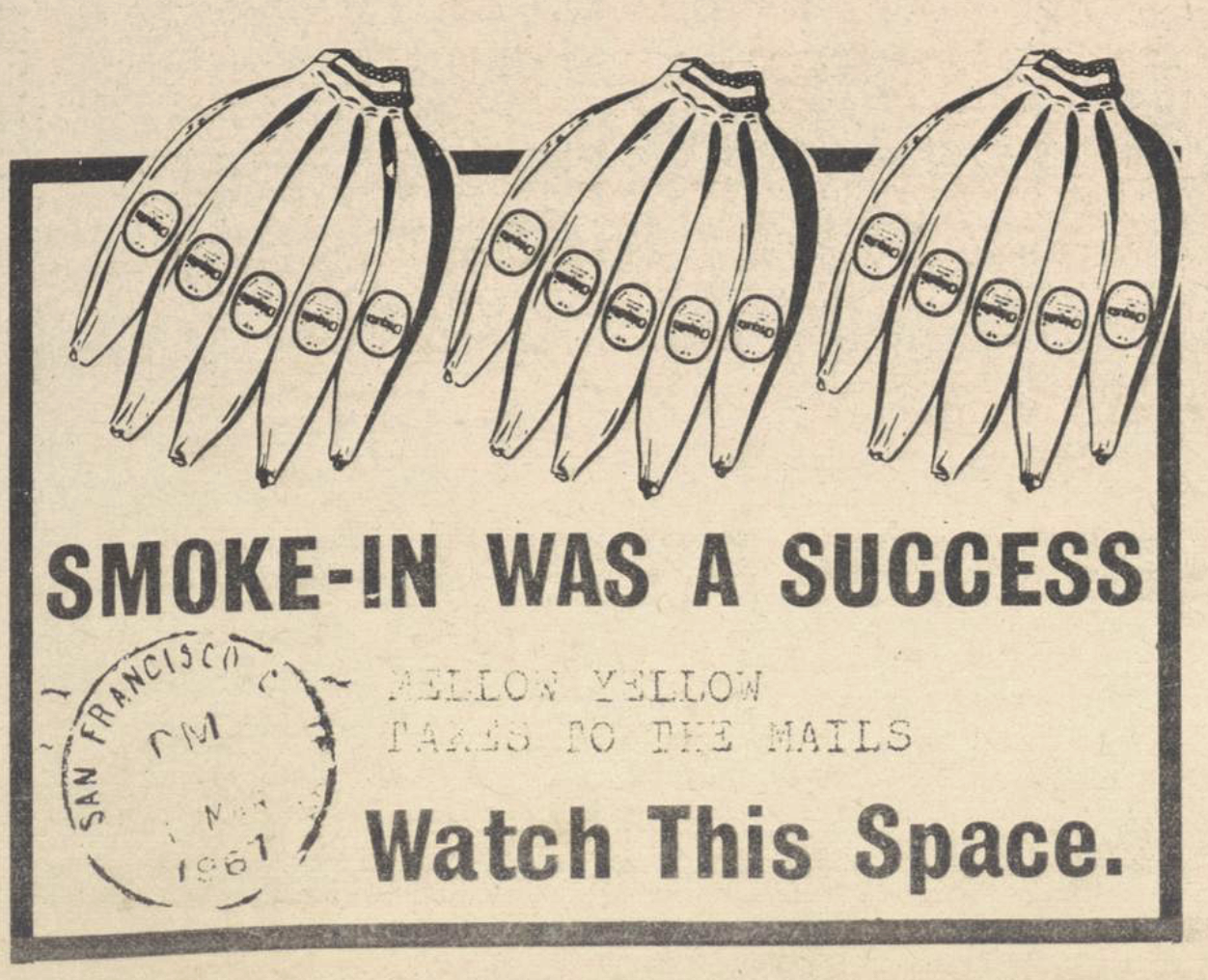
Illustration accompanying the 1967 hoax in the Berkeley Barb

Bananadine is a fictional psychoactive substance which is supposedly extracted from banana peels. A hoax recipe for its "extraction" from banana peel was originally published in the Berkeley Barb in March 1967. The Barb claimed that the recipe was excerpted from an upcoming San Francisco Oracle issue, likely to add credibility to the hoax.

== History and influence ==
Just a few months earlier, Donovan's hit single "Mellow Yellow" (1966) had been released, and in the popular culture of the era, the song was assumed to be about smoking banana peels. On August 6, 1967, shortly after the song's release, bananadine was featured in a New York Times Magazine article titled "Cool Talk About Hot Drugs". David Peel took his stage name from the hoax.

The original hoax was designed as a sort of thought experiment to raise questions about the ethics and practicality of making psychoactive drugs illegal and prosecuting those who took them: "what if the common banana contained psychoactive properties, how would the government react?" Nonetheless, the idea of smoking banana peels was taken seriously. Columnist Cecil Adams reported in The Straight Dope:

The wire services, and after them the whole country, fell for it hook, line, and roach clip. "Smokeouts" were held at Berkeley. The following Easter Sunday, the New York Times reported, "beatniks and students chanted 'banana-banana' at a 'be-in' in Central Park" and paraded around carrying a two-foot wooden banana. The Food and Drug Administration announced it was investigating "the possible hallucinogenic effects of banana peels".

Nonetheless, bananadine became more widely known when William Powell, believing the Berkeley Barb article to be true, reproduced the method in The Anarchist Cookbook in 1970, under the name "Musa sapientum Bananadine" (referring to the banana's old binomial nomenclature). In 1971, a book of one-line joke comics was released, containing a comic in which a teen is secretly handing bunches of bananas to a zoo gorilla at night, uttering the line: "Just throw the skins back, man!"

== See also ==
- Urban legends about drugs
- Jenkem
