= Folk devil =

Person or group portrayed as outsiders and deviant

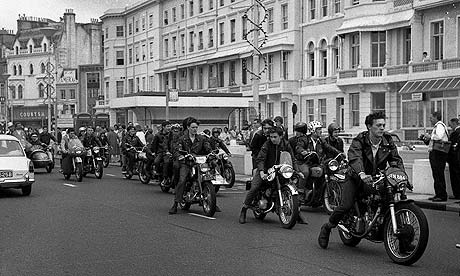
Sociologist Stanley Cohen classified the 1960s Mods and Rockers subcultures as folk devils, the groups having recognizable, oversimplified identities, and the stories of their behavior being exaggerated

Folk devils are groups portrayed in folklore or the media as outsiders and deviant, and who are blamed for crimes or other sorts of social problems.

The pursuit of folk devils frequently intensifies into a mass movement that is called a moral panic. When a moral panic is in full swing, the folk devils are the subject of loosely organized but pervasive campaigns of hostility through gossip and the spreading of urban legends. The mass media sometimes get in on the act or attempt to create new folk devils in an effort to promote controversy. Sometimes the campaign against the folk devil influences a nation's politics and legislation.

== Concept ==
The concept of the folk devil was introduced by sociologist Stanley Cohen in 1972, in his study Folk Devils and Moral Panics, which analysed media controversies concerning Mods and Rockers in the United Kingdom of the 1960s.

Cohen's research was based on the media storm over a violent clash between two youth subcultures, the mods and the rockers, on a bank holiday on a beach in England, 1964. Though the incident only resulted in some property damage without any serious physical injury to any of the individuals involved, several newspapers published sensationalist articles surrounding the event.

Cohen examined articles written about the topic and noted a pattern of distorted facts and misrepresentation, as well as a distinct, simplistic depiction of the respective images of both groups involved in the disturbance. He articulated three stages in the media's reporting on folk devils:

1. Symbolisation: the folk devil is portrayed in one singular narrative, their appearance and overall identity oversimplified to be easily recognizable.
2. Exaggeration: the facts of the controversy surrounding the folk devil are distorted, or fabricated altogether, fueling the moral crusade.
3. Prediction: further immoral actions on the part of the folk devil are anticipated.

In the case of the mods and rockers, increased police presence the following year on the bank holiday led to another occurrence of violence. Cohen noted that the depiction of mods and rockers as violent, unruly troublemakers actually led in itself to a rise in deviant behaviour by the subcultures.

== Cases ==
The basic pattern of agitations against folk devils can be seen in the history of witchhunts and similar manias of persecution; the histories of predominantly Catholic and Protestant European countries present examples of adherents of the rival Western Christian faith as folk devils; minorities and immigrants have often been seen as folk devils; in the long history of antisemitism, which frequently targets Jews with allegations of dark, murderous practices, such as blood libel; or the Roman persecution of Christians that blamed the military reverses suffered by the Roman Empire on the Christians' abandonment of paganism.

In modern times, political and religious leaders in many nations have sought to present atheists and secularists as deviant outsiders who threaten the social and moral order. The identification of folk devils may reflect the efforts of powerful institutions to displace social anxieties. Some Christian groups alleged that there were fifty million Americans who engaged in some form of devil worship within their lifetimes.

Another example of religious and ethnic discrimination associated with Cohen's folk devil theory would be Islamophobia, the discrimination of Muslims and those perceived as being Middle Eastern in origin. Post-9/11 reactions by Western countries stereotyped Muslims as violent, hateful, and of possessing fanatical extremist ideology. The group was depicted as posing a threat to social peace and safety in the Western world, and was subject to much hostility politically, from the media and from society.

Certain politicians, pundits, and media outlets are reportedly attempting to trigger that fear response by portraying transgender individuals as society's folk devils, crafting a narrative that paints them as sexual deviants and labeling them as "groomers." Even as such accusations are debunked or explained, multiple states have introduced or implemented anti-LGBT legislation as a response to the panic. The proposed laws include bans on gender-affirming care, limits on the participation of transgender athletes in sports, requirements for transgender individuals to use public bathrooms based on their assigned sex at birth and restrictions on public drag performances.

=== Columbine ===
In a 2014 study, Cohen's theory of the moral panic was applied to the media reaction to the Columbine massacre.

On April 20, 1999, Eric Harris and Dylan Klebold, two students from Columbine High School in Columbine, Colorado, went on a shooting spree which resulted in the deaths of 15 people. News reports in the weeks following the tragedy labelled the shooters as being "obsessed" with goth subculture, and suggested a link between Harris and Klebold's alleged identification with gothic subculture and their acts of violence.

In their attempt to make sense of the Columbine shootings, journalists and other media commentators linked goths to terrorism, Charles and Marilyn Manson, self-mutilation, hostage-taking, gang culture, the Waco cult, the Oklahoma City bombing, Satanism, mass murder, ethnic cleansing in Kosovo, suicide, the Internet, video games, skinhead music, white extremism and Adolf Hitler.

The ABC news program 20/20 aired a special entitled "The Goth Phenomenon" in which it reinforced claims that the shooters were heavily submerged in goth culture, and suggested that individuals of gothic subculture were to blame for homicidal activity in the past. The hostility and hysteria over the perceived 'evil' goth culture amplified in the years following the shooting. Goths were stereotyped in the media as being perpetuators or supporters of violence donned in black trench coats. Several high schools across the United States banned black trench coats and other apparel perceived as being linked to goth culture. Some police departments in the United States labelled gothic subculture as being "gang-based", and as something that should be subjected to "increased police surveillance". From the time of the Columbine shooting until 2003, there were reports of individuals sporting what was seen as gothic dress being interrogated, ticketed and arrested. In 2002, U.S. Representative Sam Graves caused Blue Springs, Missouri to be granted US$273,000 to combat the "new gothic threat". The backlash against goth subculture after the Columbine shooting draws many parallels to Stanley Cohen's research on the mods and rockers, two other youth subcultures cast as folk devils by society. In both instances the groups were portrayed in one distinct, dumbed-down image, ostracized, stripped of any redeeming qualities, and blamed for wrongdoings in society.

== See also ==
- Fearmongering
- Labeling theory
- Moral panic
- Scapegoating
