= Nachman Ben-Yehuda =

Israeli sociologist

Nachman Ben-Yehuda (Hebrew: נחמן בן יהודה; born 8 March 1948) is a professor emeritus and former dean of the department of sociology and anthropology at the Hebrew University of Jerusalem.

== Masada myth ==
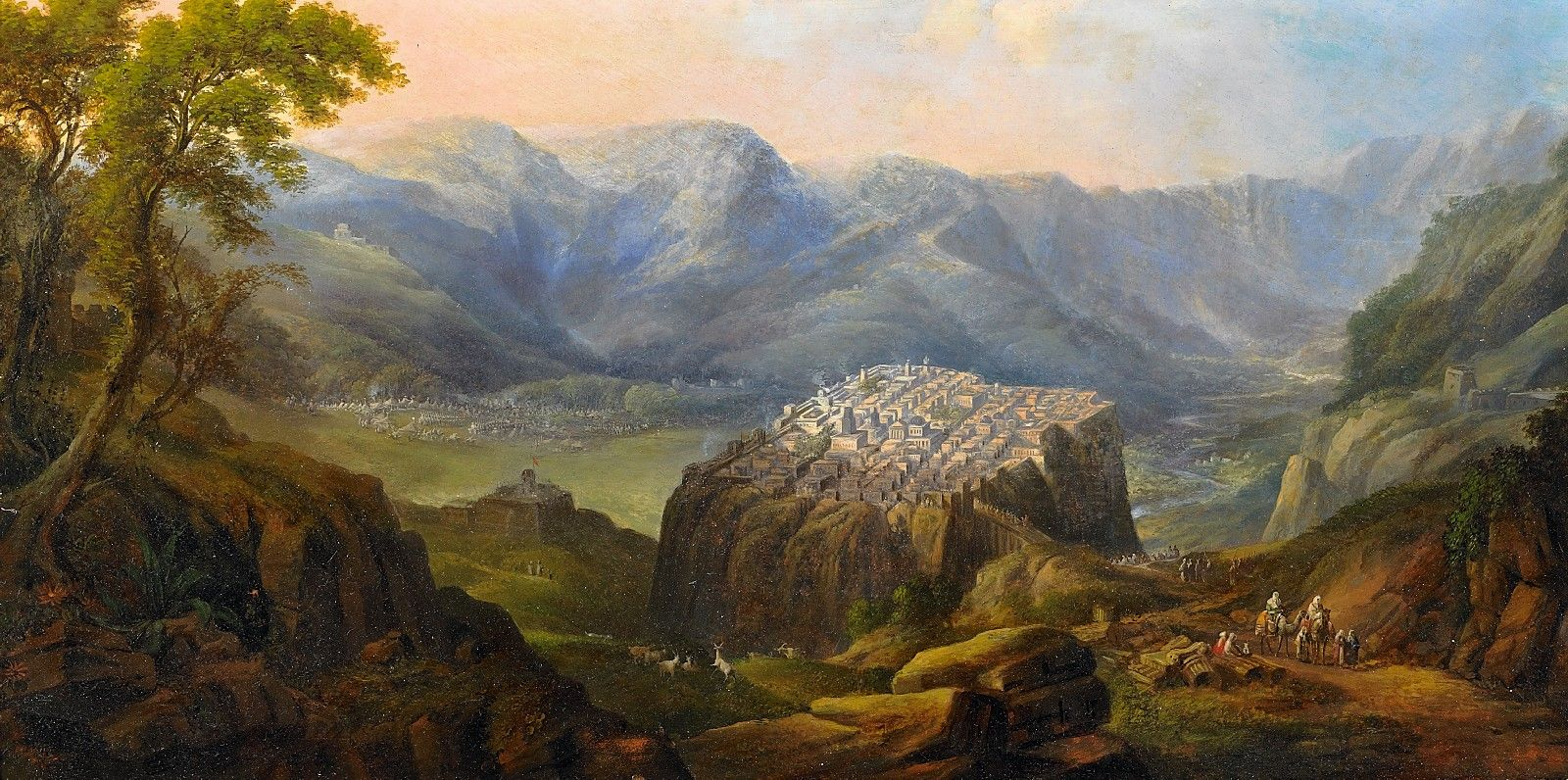
The Siege of Masada, 19th century painting after De bello Iudaico

One of Ben-Yehuda's subjects of research is the fall of the Masada fortress, the last refuge of a Jewish group, the Sicarii, to the Romans in 73 CE. During the Siege of Masada, the Sicarii committed mass suicide rather than surrender to slavery.

He views the story of Masada, as presented in the early decades of the State of Israel, as a modern legend. According to his book Sacrificing Truth, the rendition of Flavius Josephus was embellished before and after the establishment of the State of Israel. Based on transcripts of the 1963-65 archaeological dig, he claims that the team, led by Yigael Yadin, a former chief of staff of the Israel Defense Forces, fraudulently misrepresented findings and artifacts to fit within a pre-scripted narrative. Ben-Yehuda compared the story as reported in the sole historical source, Josephus, to the myth that developed during the Zionist movement from the 1940s to the 1960s. He examined how archaeologists, notably Yigael Yadin, interpreted their findings to conform to the myth.

According to Ben-Yehuda, Josephus describes the Sicarii unflatteringly. They assassinated their Jewish opponents, and would not help the Jewish Zealots who were besieged in Jerusalem. They raided nearby villages, including Ein Gedi, where they murdered 700 Jewish women and children. They offered no resistance to the Romans, and their suicide was cowardly, unheroic and unwise.

Ben-Yehuda himself was brought up on the Masada myth, and climbed Masada himself to watch the sun rise over the Dead Sea. Israeli youth movements visited Masada, and it was the location for military swearing-in ceremonies. According to the myth, the Jews at Masada were Zealots who escaped the destruction of Jerusalem and continued to harass the Romans. Ben-Yehuda quotes Moshe Dayan calling Masada "a symbol of heroism and of Liberty for the Jewish people to whom it says: Fight to death rather than surrender."

Ben-Yehuda argues that, contrary to Josephus, the myth claims that the rebels are "Zealots" rather than Sicarii, Masada was a rebel base for attacks on the Romans. The massacre in Ein Gedi disappears.

Ben-Yehuda compared Yadin's tape-recorded notes during the excavations with Yadin's later statements. For example, Yadin's team found three skeletons, of a woman, a man and a child. On the tape, Yadin said that they could not have been a family. In later writings, Yadin said that they were the remains of an important commander, his wife, and their child. Ben-Yehuda believes that Yadin's distortions were ideologically motivated.

== Selected books ==
- Fraud and Misconduct in Research: Detection, Investigation, and Organizational Response, with Amalya Oliver-Lumerman (University of Michigan Press, 2017, ISBN 978-0-472-13055-9)
- Atrocity, Deviance, and Submarine Warfare: Norms and Practices during the World Wars (University of Michigan Press, 2013, ISBN 978-0-472-11889-2)
