= Norm entrepreneur =

Someone interested in changing social norms

A norm entrepreneur or moral entrepreneur is an individual, group, or formal organization that seeks to influence a group to adopt or maintain a social norm on the basis of assumed boundaries of altruism, deviance, duty, or compassion.

== Terminology ==
The term moral entrepreneur was coined by the sociologist Howard S. Becker in Outsiders: Studies in the Sociology of Deviance (1963) in order to help explore the relationship between law and morality, as well as to explain how deviant social categories become defined and entrenched. In Becker's view, moral entrepreneurs fall into roughly two categories: rule creators, and rule enforcers.

The term norm entrepreneur was coined by Cass Sunstein in his 1996 paper titled Social Norms and Social Roles. In his paper, Sunstein highlights that existing social conditions can often be more fragile than is typically assumed, as they depend on social norms to which many may not be strongly aligned. Sunstein identifies a category of people, who he calls norm entrepreneurs, who are interested in changing social norms. Their willingness and ability to persuade others of the desirability and appropriateness of certain behaviors drives the first stage of the norm life cycle – norm emergence. If they are successful in their endeavors they can produce what he calls norm bandwagons and norm cascades, which lead to substantial changes in social norms.

Wunderlich (2020) provides an overview of norms research and discusses the emergence and development of international norms. She defines norm entrepreneurship and presents a taxonomy of various types of norm entrepreneurs, exploring their motives, objectives, and delineating the tools and conditions for their success. Wunderlich argues there is a bias towards "feel-good" norm Entrepreneurship.

== Rule creator and rule enforcer ==
Rule creators generally express the conviction that some kind of threatening social evil exists that must be combated. "The prototype of the rule creator," Becker explains, is the "crusading reformer:"

He is interested in the content of rules. The existing rules do not satisfy him because there is some evil which profoundly disturbs him. He feels that nothing can be right in the world until rules are made to correct it. He operates with an absolute ethic; what he sees is truly and totally evil with no qualification. Any means is justified to do away with it. The crusader is fervent and righteous, often self-righteous.

These moral crusaders are primarily focused on successful persuasion of others, with less concern about the means by which this persuasion is achieved. Successful moral crusades are generally dominated by those in the upper social strata of society. They often include religious groups, lawmaking bodies, and stakeholders in a given field. There is political competition in which these moral crusaders originate crusades aimed at generating reform, based on what they think is moral, therefore defining deviance. Moral crusaders must have power, public support, generate public awareness of the issue, and be able to propose a clear and acceptable solution to the problem. The degree of a moral entrepreneur's power is highly dependent upon the social and cultural context.

The sociology of social control seeks to predict and explain the behavior of both rule creators and rule enforcers. The creation and application of explicit rules are seen as characteristics of moralism, or the tendency to treat people as enemies. Among the social conditions that are identified as sources of moralism are status superiority and social remoteness between the agents of social control and the people whose behavior they regulate. Thus, the most likely targets of both rule creators and rule enforcers are those who are socially inferior, culturally different, and personally unknown. It is their behavior that is most likely to seem objectionable and to call forth the strenuous efforts of moral entrepreneurs. Once moral entrepreneurs or claimsmakers define the behaviors of these individuals or groups as deviant or a moral threat, then the entire group may be seen by society as a deviant subculture. Similarly, they or their behavior may be seen as the roots of the next moral panic. This is often the goal of the moral entrepreneurs: to rally the support of society behind their specific aims through the redefining of behaviors and groups as deviant or problematic. Alternately, those individuals with social power, wealth, high status, or large public support bases are the most likely to assert this power and to act as a moral entrepreneur.

== Social problems ==
According to Richard Posner—who was also influential to the concept of moral entrepreneurship, after Howard Becker—moral entrepreneurs are people with "the power to change our moral intuitions." They do not use rational argument, and according to Posner:

Rather, they mix appeals to self-interest with emotional appeals that bypass our rational calculating faculty and stir inarticulable feelings of oneness with or separateness from the people (or it could be land, or animals) that are to constitute, or be ejected from, the community that the moral entrepreneur is trying to create. They teach us to love or hate whom they love or hate.

Moral entrepreneurs are critical for moral emergence (and moral panic) because they call attention to or even 'create' issues by using language that names, interprets, and dramatizes them. Typifying is a prominent rhetorical tool employed by moral entrepreneurs when attempting to define social problems. Typification is when claimsmakers characterize a problem's nature which is most commonly done by suggesting that a problem is best understood from a particular perspective (i.e. medical, moral, criminal, political, etc.) Therefore, moral entrepreneurs often engage in typification by claiming that certain behaviors or groups are acting in morally dangerous ways. Moral entrepreneurs are more successful at defining deviance when they can identify an entire group with a particular behavior and create fear that the behavior represents a danger not only to the group but also to the rest of society. Through typification and the creation of a dangerous class, moral entrepreneurs aim to place the activities of a particular group on the public's agenda and label certain actions as social problems.

Claimsmakers in areas such as the problem of drinking and driving, child abuse, or date rape, play an important role in the creation of the rhetoric that creates and determines what is deviant and what is a considered a problem in society.

== Lawmaking ==
Moral entrepreneurs are also central in the construction of social deviance, including the development of drug scares. The role of moral entrepreneurs in this instance, for example, is to assign responsibility to drugs for an array of preexisting public problems. Over the course of the past century, drug laws have been passed with the intent of reducing drug problems; even if they have not done this, they have certainly expanded the power of the social control held by moral entrepreneurs.

== See also ==
- Deviance (sociology)
- Labeling theory
- Lobbying
- Moral panic
- Norm (social)
