= Mods and rockers =

Conflict of two British youth subcultures

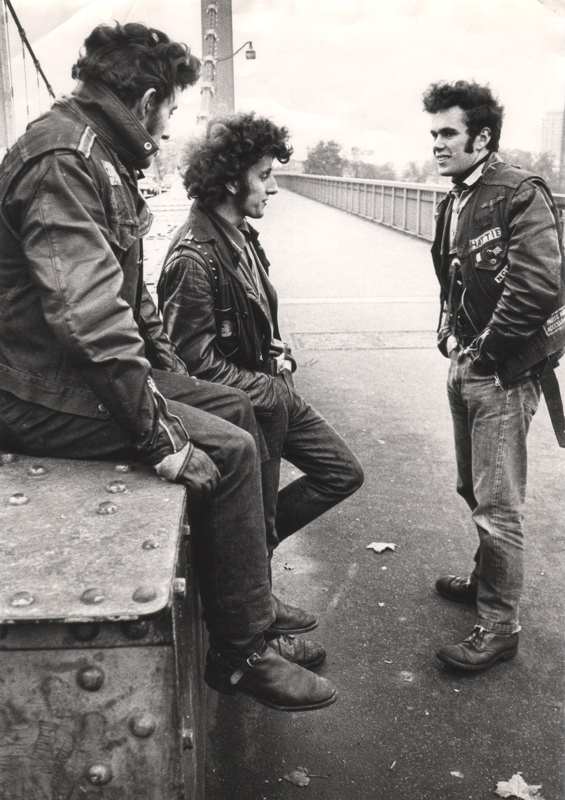
Three rockers on Chelsea Bridge

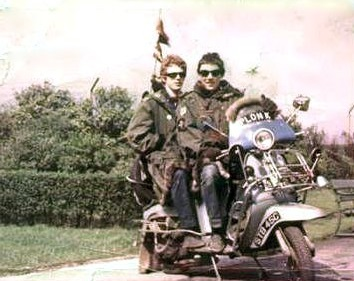
Two mods on a Lambretta 175 scooter

Mods and rockers were two conflicting British youth subcultures of the late 1950s to mid 1960s. News coverage of the two groups fighting in 1964 sparked a moral panic about British youth, and they became widely perceived as violent, unruly trouble-makers.

The rocker subculture was centred on motorcycling. Rockers generally wore protective clothing such as black leather jackets and motorcycle boots or winklepickers. The style was influenced by Marlon Brando in the 1953 film The Wild One. The common rocker hairstyle was a quiff or pompadour, while their music genre of choice was 1950s to early 60s rock and roll and R&B, played by artists including Eddie Cochran, Gene Vincent, and Bo Diddley, as well as British rock and roll musicians such as Billy Fury and Johnny Kidd.

The mod subculture was centred on fashion and music, and many mods wore parkas and rode scooters. Mods wore suits and other clean-cut outfits, and listened to music genres such as modern jazz, soul, Motown, ska and British rhythm and blues-rooted bands like the Who and the Small Faces, and later the Yardbirds and the Jam. The Who wrote a portrait of the cultures with their 1973 album and movie score Quadrophenia.

== Physical conflicts ==
BBC News stories from May 1964 stated that mods and rockers were jailed after riots in seaside resort towns in Southern England, such as Margate in Kent, Brighton in Sussex, and Clacton in Essex.

Conflicts took place at Clacton and Hastings during the Easter weekend of 1964. A second round took place on the south coast of England over the Whitsun weekend (18 and 19 May 1964), especially at Brighton, where fights occurred over two days and moved along the coast to Hastings and back; hence the "Second Battle of Hastings" tag. A small number of rockers were isolated on Brighton beach where they – despite being protected by police – were overwhelmed and assaulted by mods. Eventually calm was restored and a judge levied heavy fines, describing those arrested as "sawdust Caesars".

Newspapers described the mod and rocker clashes as being of "disastrous proportions", and labelled mods and rockers as "vermin" and "louts". Newspaper editorials fanned the flames of hysteria, such as a Birmingham Post editorial in May 1964, which warned that mods and rockers were "internal enemies" in the UK who would "bring about disintegration of a nation's character". The magazine Police Review argued that the mods and rockers' purported lack of respect for law and order could cause violence to "surge and flame like a forest fire".

As a result of this news coverage, two British members of parliament travelled to the seaside areas to survey the damage, and M.P. Harold Gurden called for a resolution for intensified measures to control hooliganism. One of the prosecutors in the trial of some of the Clacton brawlers argued that mods and rockers were youths with no serious views, who lacked respect for law and order.

There were occasional incidents thereafter. In 1980, during the mod revival, the punk rock band the Exploited recorded the song "Fuck the Mods" on their E.P. Army Life, whose back cover stated "To all the Edinburgh punks and skins – keep on mod-bashing!!" The band performed in Finsbury Park, London in 1981 on the same night that the Jam were playing nearby, and there was fighting after the gigs between the mods who had watched the Jam and the rockers who had watched the Exploited.

== Academic debunking ==
The sociologist Stanley Cohen was led by his retrospective study of the mods and rockers conflict to develop the term "moral panic". In his 1972 study Folk Devils and Moral Panics, he examined news coverage of the mod and rocker riots in the 1960s. He conceded that mods and rockers had some fights in the mid-1960s, but argues that they were no different from the evening brawls that occurred between youths throughout the 1950s and early 1960s at seaside resorts and after football games. He argued that the U.K. press turned the mod subculture into a symbol of delinquent and deviant status.

Cohen argued that as hysteria about knife-wielding mods increased, the image of a fur-collared anorak and scooter would "stimulate hostile and punitive reactions". He said the news media used possibly faked interviews with supposed rockers such as "Mick the Wild One". The press also tried to exploit accidents that were unrelated to mod–rocker violence, such as an accidental drowning of a youth, which resulted in the headline "Mod Dead in Sea".

Eventually, when the press ran out of real fights to report, they would publish deceptive headlines, such as using a subheading "Violence", even when the article reported that there was no violence at all. Newspaper writers also began to associate mods and rockers with various social issues, such as teen pregnancy, contraceptives, amphetamines and violence.

== In film ==
In the Beatles' 1964 film A Hard Day's Night, Ringo Starr was asked by a reporter, "Are you a mod or a rocker?" Starr answered, "Uh, no, I'm a mocker." Paul McCartney originally gave this response in an April 1964 interview.

The 1979 film Quadrophenia starring Phil Daniels as Jimmy, Leslie Ash as Steph and Sting the lead singer of the English band the Police as Ace Face, is set against the background of the 1964 Brighton clash with the incident featuring prominently.

The 2010 remake of the 1948 film Brighton Rock is set in the era of mods and rockers, with Bank Holiday tribal clashes on Brighton promenades and beaches.

== See also ==
- Mods & Rockers Film Festival
