= Stanley Cohen (sociologist) =

British sociologist (1942–2013)

Stanley Cohen FBA
- Born: 23 February 1942; Johannesburg, South Africa
- Died: 7 January 2013 (aged 70); London, United Kingdom

Philosophical work
- Era: 20th-century philosophy
- Institutions: London School of Economics; Durham University; University of Essex; Hebrew University of Jerusalem
- Main interests: juvenile delinquency, subculture, social control theory, human rights violations,
- Notable ideas: moral panic, normality of denial

Stanley Cohen FBA (23 February 1942 – 7 January 2013) was a South African-British sociologist and criminologist, Professor of Sociology at the London School of Economics, known for breaking academic ground on "emotional management", including the mismanagement of emotions in the form of sentimentality, overreaction, and emotional denial. He is also known for developing the concept moral panics. He had a lifelong concern with human rights violations, first growing up in South Africa, later studying imprisonment in England and finally in Israel. He founded the Centre for the Study of Human Rights at the London School of Economics.

== Life ==
Cohen was born in Johannesburg, South Africa in 1942, son of a Lithuanian businessman. He grew up as a Zionist and intended to settle in Israel. He studied Sociology and Social Work as an undergraduate at the University of Witwatersrand, getting involved in anti-apartheid issues.

He came to London in 1963, where he worked as a social worker, before completing his PhD at London School of Economics (LSE) about the social reactions to juvenile delinquency. The Mods and Rockers youth riots were then occurring at England's southern seaside towns, which he studied in the sensational press reactions and by direct interviews. From 1967, he lectured sociology briefly at the Enfield College, NE London, and then at Durham University. During this time of the student rebellions of 1968 he was influenced by the anti-psychiatry movement and participated in the National Deviancy Symposium. A project in Durham prison with Laurie Taylor from York, led to their publication of three books, namely Psychological Survival: The Experience of Long-term Imprisonment (1972), Escape Attempts (1976), Prison Secrets (1978) and the later Visions of Social Control: Crime, Punishment and Classification (1985) which Cohen wrote alone.

From 1972 until 1980, he worked as Professor of Sociology at the University of Essex.

In 1980, he moved with his family to Israel, where he became the Director of the Institute of Criminology at the Hebrew University of Jerusalem. He worked with human rights organisations campaigning against torture and dealing with the Israeli–Palestinian conflict.

He returned to England in 1996 after being diagnosed with Parkinson's disease and was appointed Martin White Professor of Sociology at LSE, where he worked until retirement in 2005. In 1998 Cohen was elected a fellow of the British Academy. In 2003, he received an honorary doctorate from University of Essex, and in 2008 from Middlesex University. In 2009 he was the first recipient of an Outstanding Achievement Award from the British Society of Criminology. He died on 7 January 2013 from consequences of Parkinson's disease.

== Work ==
Cohen was a leading writer on criminology and sociology.

=== Folk Devils and Moral Panic (1972) ===
Cohen's 1972 study (Folk Devils and Moral Panics) of the UK popular media and social reaction to the Mods and Rockers phenomenon is widely regarded by British criminologists as one of the most influential works in the field in the last forty years. The work applied the concepts of labelling, societal reaction and the notion of the Deviancy Amplification Spiral. It helped to shift the focus of Criminology away from the causes of crime towards social reaction, the sociology of crime and Social Control. Cohen suggested the media overreact to an aspect of behaviour which may be seen as a challenge to existing social norms. However, the media response and representation of that behaviour actually helps to define it, communicate it and portrays it as a model for outsiders to observe and adopt. So the moral panic by society represented in the media arguably fuels further socially unacceptable behaviour. Although Cohen is credited with coining the term moral panic the term is quite old - for instance an early usage can be found in the Quarterly Christian Spectator in 1830 and it was used by the Canadian communications theorist Marshall McLuhan in 1964.

=== States of Denial (2001) ===
Cohen's last book States of Denial: Knowing about Atrocities and Suffering attempts to analyze personal and political ways in which humans avoid uncomfortable realities, like poverty, suffering, injustice. In 11 chapters he examines elementary forms of denial, Knowing and Not-Knowing: The Psychology of Denial (How could people simultaneously know and not know about such matters?), Denial at Work: Mechanisms and Rhetorical Devices, Accounting for Atrocities: Perpetrators and Officials, Blocking Out the Past: Personal Memories, Public Histories, Bystander States (Though ignorance is bliss, to what extent is a bystander a perpetrator?, Images of Suffering, Appeals: Outrage Into Action, Digging Up Graves, Opening Wounds: Acknowledging the Past, Acknowledgement Now (societal and personal transformation) and concludes with Loose Ends.

The book has been highly praised by reviewers in the English speaking world. The Guardian wrote, "He leads the reader to the conclusion that it is denial that is 'normal' and an ability to see the truth and act accordingly which is rare, whether in individuals or in governments." Michael Ignatieff said "this book will become the starting point for all future debate on the subject".

States of Denial examines how people are in denial about racial oppression, slavery and other suffering. Cohen explains that many people know that racially-oppressive acts occur, yet deny it. He writes how it seems as if these people only want to signify and realize things that they want, not actual reality. He says that people do know yet do not know that there is suffering and oppression, as if they choose to ignore it rather than talk about such an uneasy topic. Many people assume, and sometimes witness these acts occur, yet when asked will deny anything ever happened. Stanley Cohen writes about how people act blind to reality, due to uncomfortable and uneasy topics. According to Cohen, many people are in touch with the fact that racial oppression still occurs, along with other acts of human suffering, yet deny that those actions happen. The topic of racial oppression being such an uncomfortable topic makes it hard for many to acknowledge that it actually happens to this day. Stanley Cohen's point of the book is to bring awareness to those who do not see the truth being mass incarceration and how society is structured. He wants people to realize how much people choose to ignore in society today, and that it needs to change.

== Personal life ==
In 1963, Cohen married Ruth Kretzmer. She died in 2003; As of 2013, they were survived by their two daughters Judith and Jessica.

Laurie Taylor commented on his personality this way: "He could be cruel about the pedants and time-servers he met along the way, intolerant of those who modified their political principles as they gained promotion." Cohen's love of jokes and self-deprecating humor is exemplified in an anecdote when Taylor mentioned cutting down drinking during their next academic collaboration, like Richard Burton, who said that he "could see the world as it really was", to which Cohen replied "That's all very well, but who the hell wants to see the world as it really is?".

== Publications ==
=== 1960s ===
- Cohen, S. (1969) Hooligans, vandals and the community: a study of social reaction to juvenile delinquency. PhD thesis, The London School of Economics and Political Science (LSE).

=== 1970s ===
- Cohen, S. (ed) (1971) Images of Deviance Harmondsworth: Penguin
- Cohen, S. (1971) "Directions for Research on adolescent group violence and vandalism", British Journal of Criminology, 11(4): 319–340
- Cohen, S. (1971) "Protest, unrest and delinquency: convergences in labels or behaviour?" Paper given to the International Symposium on Youth Unrest, Tel Aviv 25–27 October
- Cohen, S. (1972) Folk Devils and Moral Panics, London: MacGibbon and Kee
- Cohen, S. (1972) "Breaking out, smashing up and the social context of aspiration" In: Riven, B. (ed) Youth at the Beginning of the Seventies, London: Martin Robertson
- Taylor, L. & Cohen, S. (1972) Psychological Survival: the Experience of Long Term Imprisonment, Harmondsworth: Penguin
- Cohen, S. & Taylor, Laurie (1976) Escape attempts: the theory and practice of resistance in everyday life ISBN 978-0-415-06500-9
- Cohen, S. (1979) "The punitive city: notes on the dispersal of social control", Contemporary Crises, 3(4): 341–363

=== 1980s ===
- Cohen, S. (1980) "Footprints in the Sand: A Further Report on criminology and the sociology of deviance in Britain" In: Fitzgerald, M., McLennan, G. & Pawson, J. (eds) Crime and Society: Readings in History and Theory, London: Routledge and Kegan Paul pg.240
- Cohen, S. (1982) "Western Crime Control Models in the Third World," in S. Spitzer and R. Simon (eds.), Research in Law, Deviance and Social Control Vol. 4.
- Cohen, S. & Scull, A. (eds.) (1983) Social Control and the State: Historical and Comparative Essays Oxford: Martin Robertson
- Cohen, S. (1985) Visions of Social Control: Crime, Punishment and Classification, Polity Press
- Cohen, S. (1988) Against Criminology, New Brunswick, NJ: Transaction Books
- Cohen, S. (1988) "Taking Decentralization Seriously: Values, Visions and Policies," in J. Lowman et al. (eds.), Transcarceration: Essays on the Sociology of Social Control, Aldershot: Gower.

=== 1990s ===
- Cohen, S. (1990) "Intellectual Scepticism and Political Commitment: The Case of Radical Criminology," Institute of Criminology, University of Amsterdam.
- Cohen, S. (1991) "Talking about torture in Israel", Tikkun, 6(6): 23–30, 89–90
- Cohen, S. (1993) "Human rights and crimes of the state: the culture of denial", Australian and New Zealand Journal of Criminology, 26(2): 97–115. John Barry Memorial Lecture, University of Melbourne, 30 September 1992

=== 2000s ===
- Cohen, S. (2001) States of Denial: Knowing about Atrocities and Suffering, Polity Press, 360 pages, ISBN 978-0-7456-2392-4
- Cohen, S. & Seu, B. (2002) "Knowing Enough Not to Feel Too Much," in P. Petro (ed.) Truth Claims: Representations and Human Rights, Piscataway, NJ: Rutgers University Press. 256 pages. ISBN 0813530520.

=== 2010s ===
- Cohen, S. (December 2011). "Whose side were we on? The undeclared politics of moral panic theory". Crime, Media, Culture. 7 (3): 237–243. doi:10.1177/1741659011417603. S2CID 145462357.

== See also ==
- Agnotology
- Denialism
