= Café racer =

Genre of sporting motorcycle

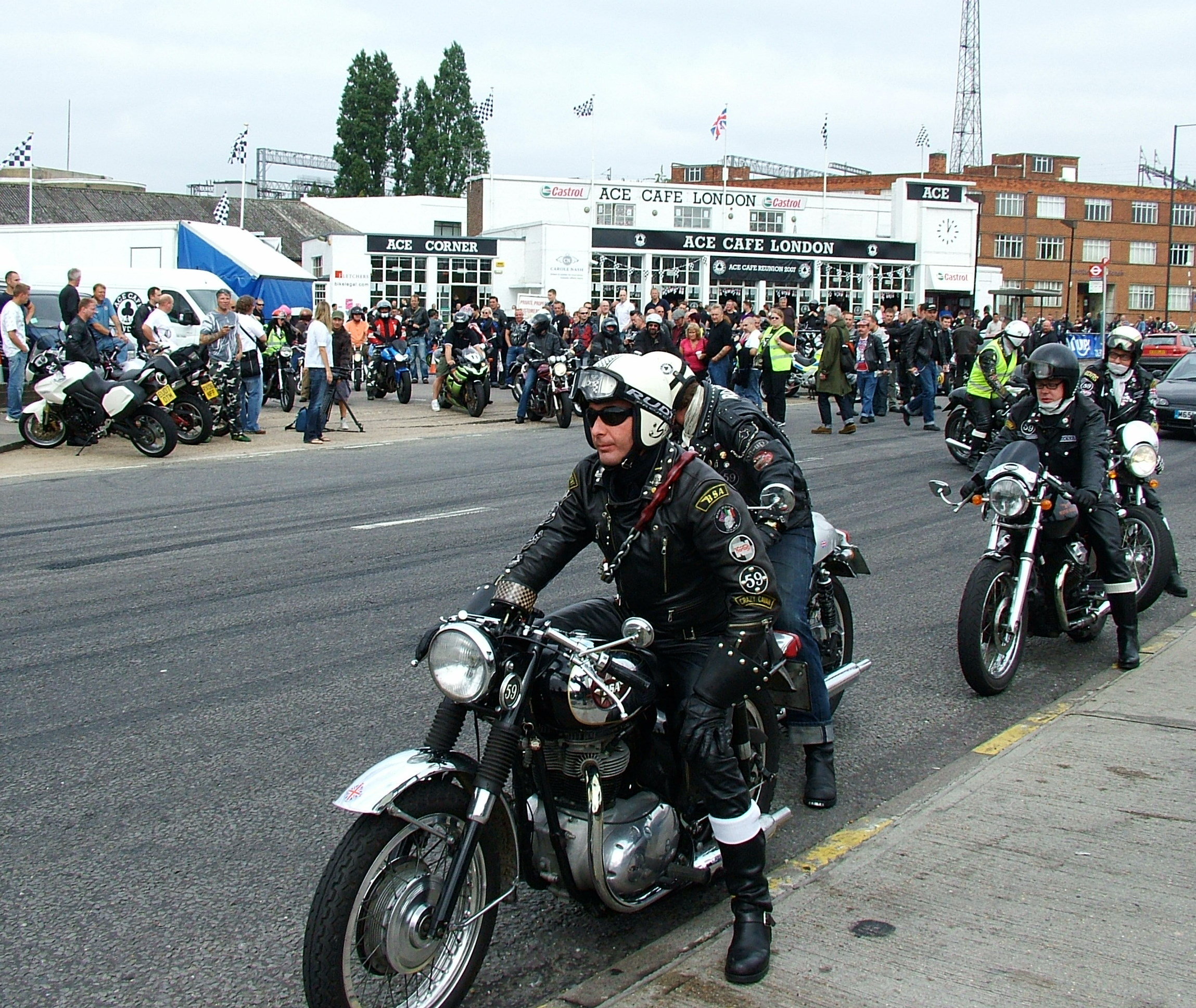
BSA café racer at the Ace Cafe. (The rider is wearing a 59 Club badge).

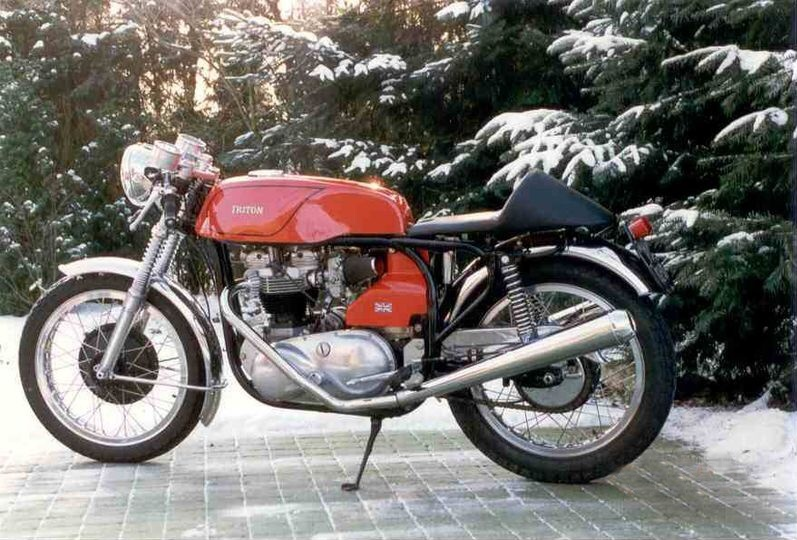
Triton café racer with a Triumph engine in a Norton Featherbed frame

A café racer is a genre of sport motorcycles that purportedly originated among British motorcycle enthusiasts of the early 1960s in London. Café racers were initially just standard production bikes that were later modified by their owners and optimised for speed and handling for quick rides over short distances. Café racers have since become popular around the world, and some manufacturers produce factory-made models that are available in the showrooms.

The term is currently (2025) in use by 'motorcycle pundits' and motorcycle stylists, but its actual origins are highly dubious. A review of supporting citations referring to the expression are relatively modern and often originate from sources that are not British and often not related to motorcycling. The specific term likely entered the motorcycling vernacular far later than the suggested 1960s.

Defined by visual minimalism, a café racer was typically an air-cooled parallel twin motorcycle with low-mounted handlebars and rear-seat footrests. Items considered "non-essential" such as side panels, chain enclosures, and large mudguards (fenders) were replaced by lighter components, or the components dispensed with altogether.

== Café racer origins ==
Café racers were particularly associated with the urban rocker or "ton-up boys" youth subculture, where the bikes were used for short, quick rides between popular cafés, such as London's Ace Cafe on the North Circular ring road, and Watford's Busy Bee café. In post-war Britain, car ownership was still uncommon, but as rationing and austerity diminished, by the late 1950s young people could for the first time afford a motorcycle. Previously, motorcycles (often with voluminous sidecars) provided family transport, but the growing economy enabled such families to afford a car and dispense with a motorcycle at last. Many of these motorcycles were second hand, or retired military motorcycles which were no longer eligible for service. They were often small-mid sized displacement motors with bolt on accessories and fairings attached to the body for military use. Young people were eager to buy such cast-off motorcycles and modify them into café racers, which for them represented speed, status, and rebellion, rather than mere inability to afford a car.

The café racer idea caught on in the US, which was already a major market for British motorcycles. In 2014, journalist Ben Stewart recognised the café racer as a European style that would be appreciated in America. Writing in 1973, Wallace Wyss claimed that the term "café racer" was originally used in Europe to describe a "motorcyclist who played at being an Isle of Man road racer".

=== Subculture ===
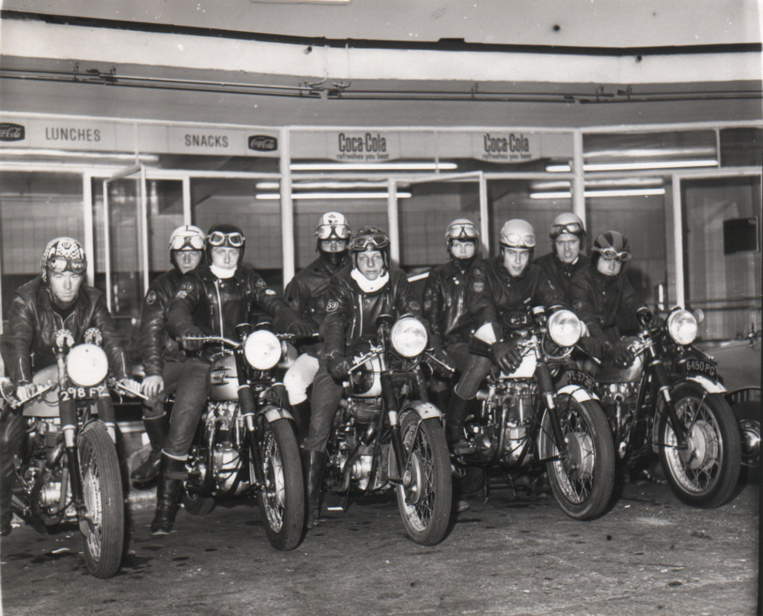
1960s Rockers outside Watford's Busy Bee Café

The term "Rockers" was applied to a young and rebellious rock and roll subculture who wanted to escape the convention of mainstream 1950s UK culture. Owning a fast, personalised, and distinctive café racer gave them status and allowed them to ride between transport cafés in and around towns and cities. Biker lore has it that one goal was to reach "the ton" (100 miles per hour (160 km/h) along a route where the rider would leave from a café, race to a predetermined point, and return to the café before a single song could play on the jukebox, called record-racing. However, author Mike Seate contends that record-racing is a myth, the story having originated in an episode of the BBC Dixon of Dock Green television show.

== Café racer configuration ==
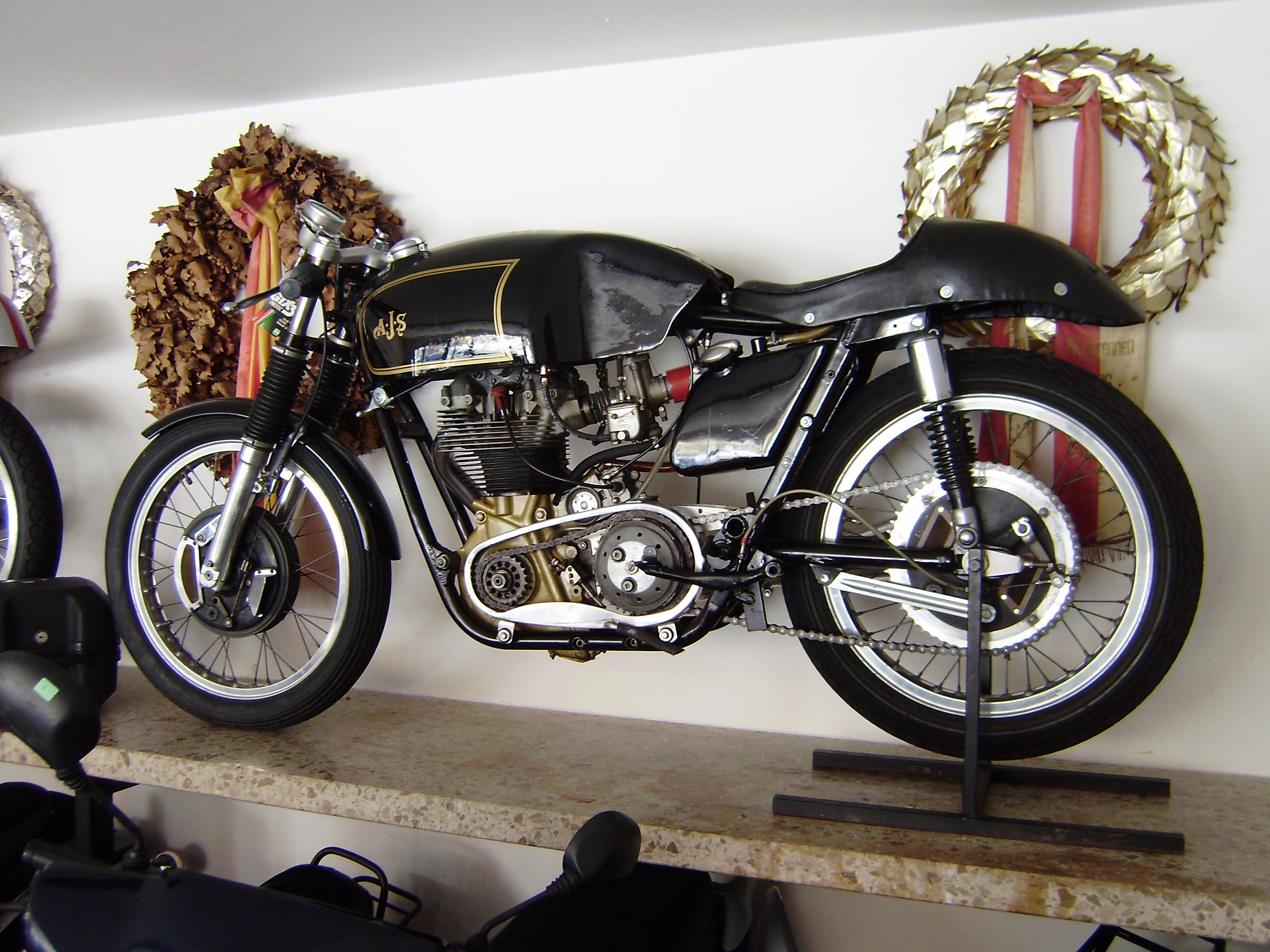
A 1962 AJS 7R 350 cc race bike, with features often imitated by café racers

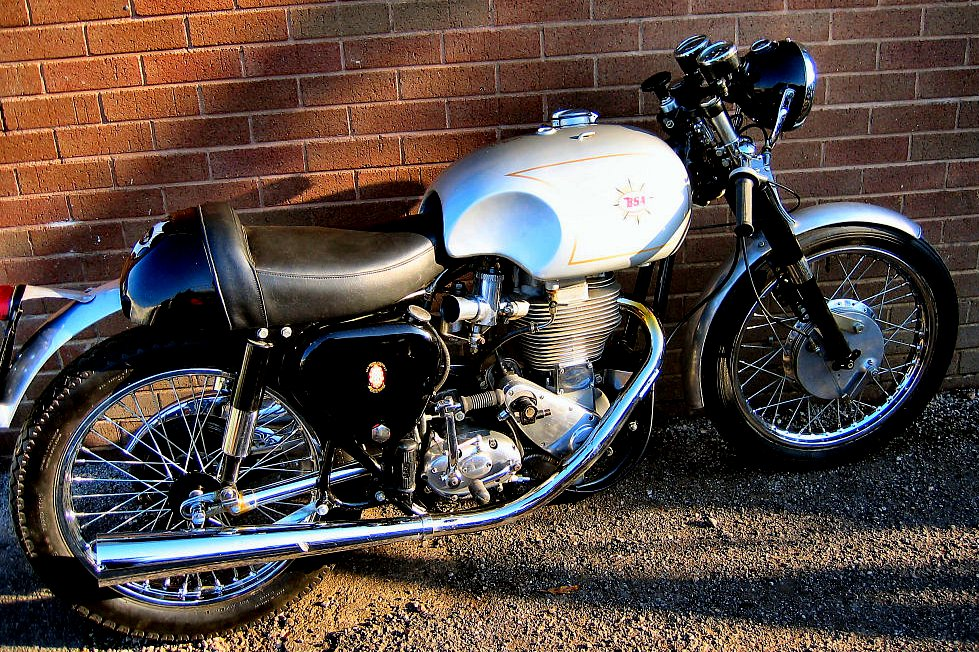
BSA Gold Star 500 café racer

Café racer riders would often lighten their bikes, and tune their engine, typically fitting "clip-ons" (or dropped handlebars) and rear-set footrests, which enabled the rider to "tuck in", reducing wind resistance and improving control. Occasionally, café racers might be fitted with half- or even full-race-style fairings. Some bikes had swept-back pipes, reverse cone megaphone mufflers, TT100 Dunlop tires, and larger carburetors (often with inlet trumpet rather than air filters). Occasionally the standard dual seat would be replaced by a solo saddle.

As owners became more experimental, they would fit engines in different frames. A typical example was the "Triton", a homemade combination of a Triumph Bonneville engine in a Norton Featherbed frame. A less common hybrid was the "Tribsa", which had a Triumph engine in a BSA duplex frame. Other hybrids included the "NorVin" (a Vincent V-Twin engine in a Featherbed frame), and bikes with racing frames by Rickman or Seeley.

== Evolution ==
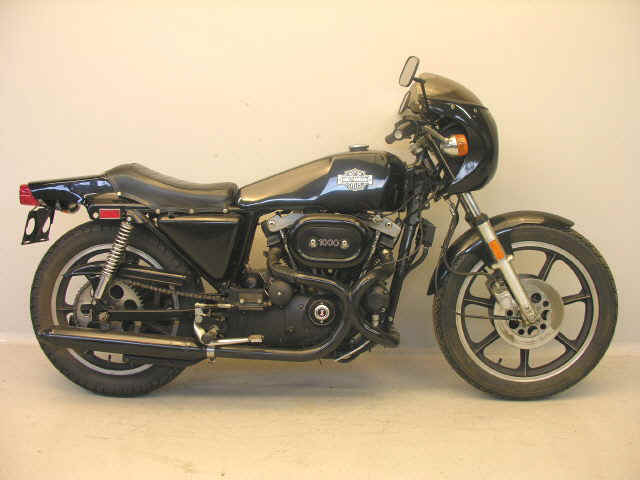
1977 Harley-Davidson XLCR

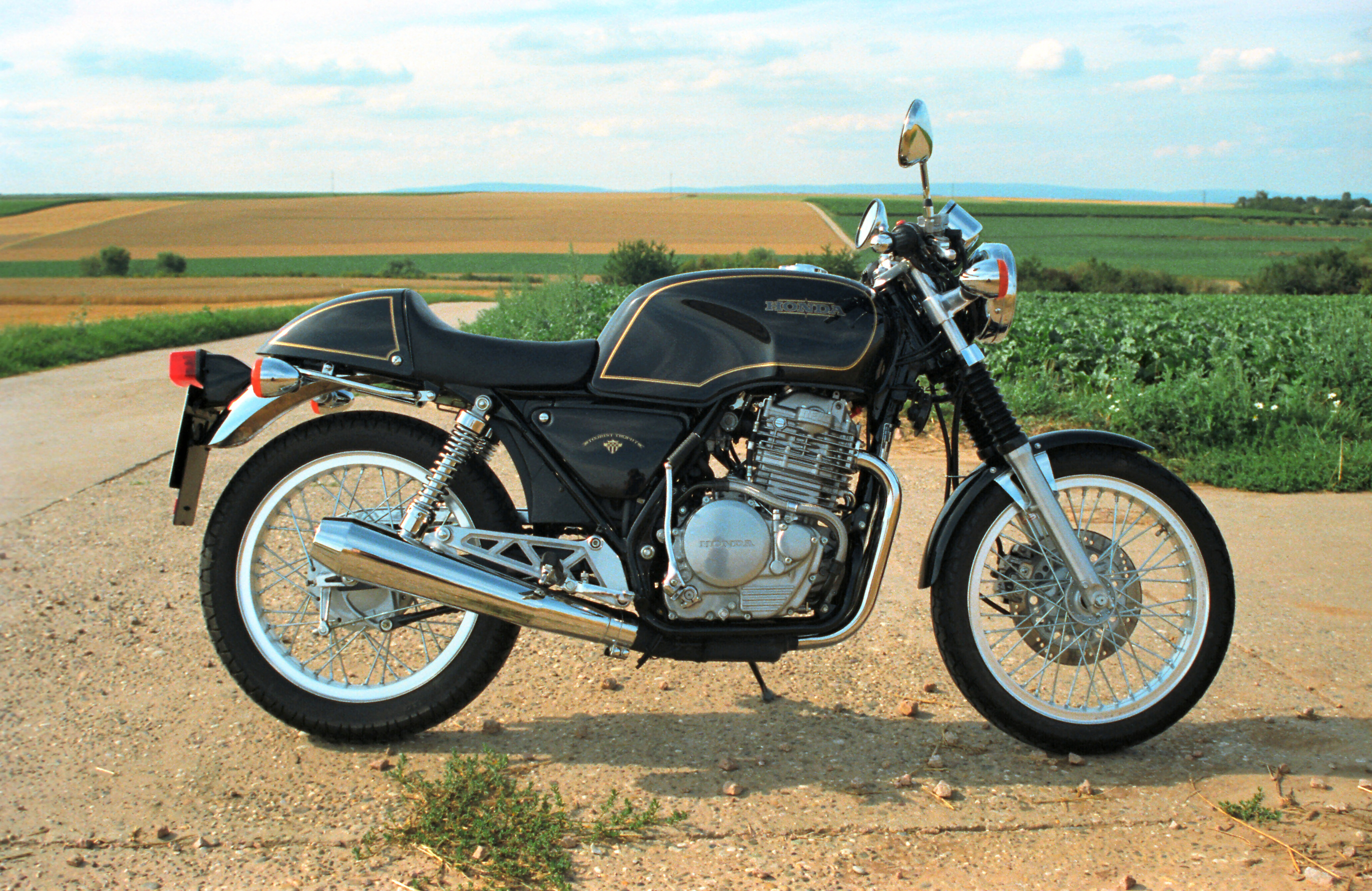
Honda GB500 TT café racer

Café racer styling evolved throughout the time of their popularity. By the mid-1970s, Japanese bikes had overtaken British bikes in the marketplace, and the look of real Grand Prix racing bikes had changed. The hand-made, frequently unpainted aluminium racing fuel tanks of the 1960s had evolved into square, narrow, fibreglass tanks. Increasingly, three-cylinder Kawasaki two-strokes, four-cylinder four-stroke Kawasaki Z1, and four-cylinder Honda engines were the basis for café racer conversions. By 1977, a number of manufacturers had taken notice of the café racer boom and were producing factory café racers, such as the well-received Moto Guzzi Le Mans and the Harley-Davidson XLCR. The Japanese domestic market started making cafe racer replicas in the early 1980s, first Honda with the GB250 in 1983, then GB400 and GB500 versions in 1985. The GB400TTMKII has a frame mounted fairing and single seat with cowl. The Honda GB500 TT, sought to emulate BSA and Norton café racers of the 1960s. Markets outside got the XBR500 in 1985, with more angular modern styling to compete with the Yamaha SRX600, until Honda USA released a version of the GB500 in 1989.

In the mid-1970s, riders continued to modify standard production motorcycles into so-called "café racers" by equipping them with clubman bars and a small fairing around the headlight. A number of European manufacturers, including Benelli, BMW, Bultaco, and Derbi produced factory "café" variants of their standard motorcycles in this manner, without any modifications made to make them faster or more powerful, a trend that continues today.

Amidst the end of the 1970's and early 1980's, small displacement, affordable Japanese sport bikes became standard on the motorcycle market. A new "café racer" sub-genre appeared within the scene, known as the "street fighter". Street fighter bikes often boast similar aerodynamic choices as the traditional café racer, removing fairings, accessory panels. These bikes often mimic the aesthetics of the café racer as well, transplanting and a round headlight onto the front forks. The "street fighter" culture imbued many similar values to that of the café racer for another generation of riders.

Although many riders of four-strokes associate cafe racers with four-stroke motors and British marques, and with an era prior to the onslaught of mostly-Japanese two-strokes, owners of two-stroke standard motorcycles have also been as enthusiastic at modifying their motorcycles into cafe racers, although the riders are less likely to ape 1950s clothing and hair fashions. During the course of the 1980s, manufacturers mostly phased out two-stroke standard motorcycles, replacing them with race replicas. Many obsolete standard designs continued to be manufactured or distributed from remaining stocks, especially in less wealthy countries. 1970s Yamaha and Honda designs, by example, were distributed or manufactured in India and elsewhere through partnerships with Indian manufacturers such as Escorts (partnered with Yamaha) and Hero Cycles (Hero Honda). Owners of these machines in countries where they are still available, such as India, Malaysia, and the Philippines have continued to modify these two-stroke standard motorcycles into cafe racers. Manufacturers of newer two-stroke designs also produce cafe racer inspired models, including the British 250cc Langen cafe racer announced in 2020.

== Modern café racers ==
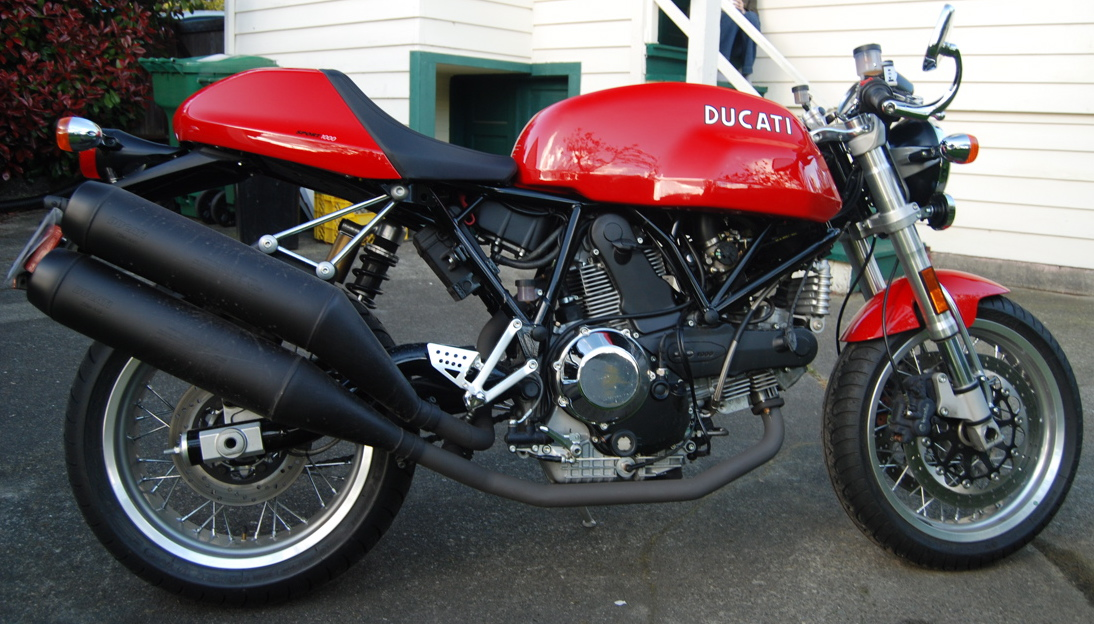
2006 Ducati SportClassic 1000

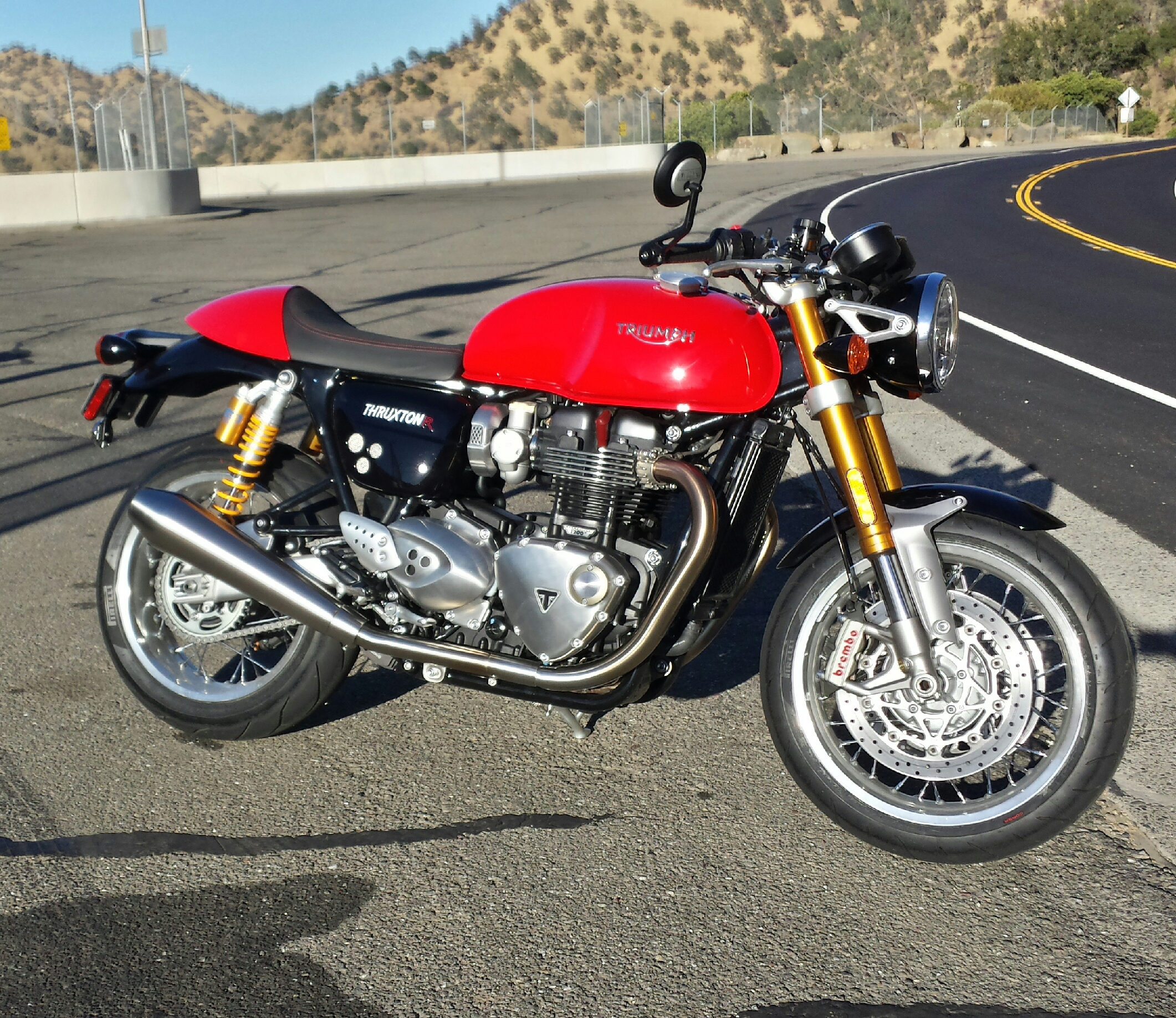
1200cc Triumph Thruxton R

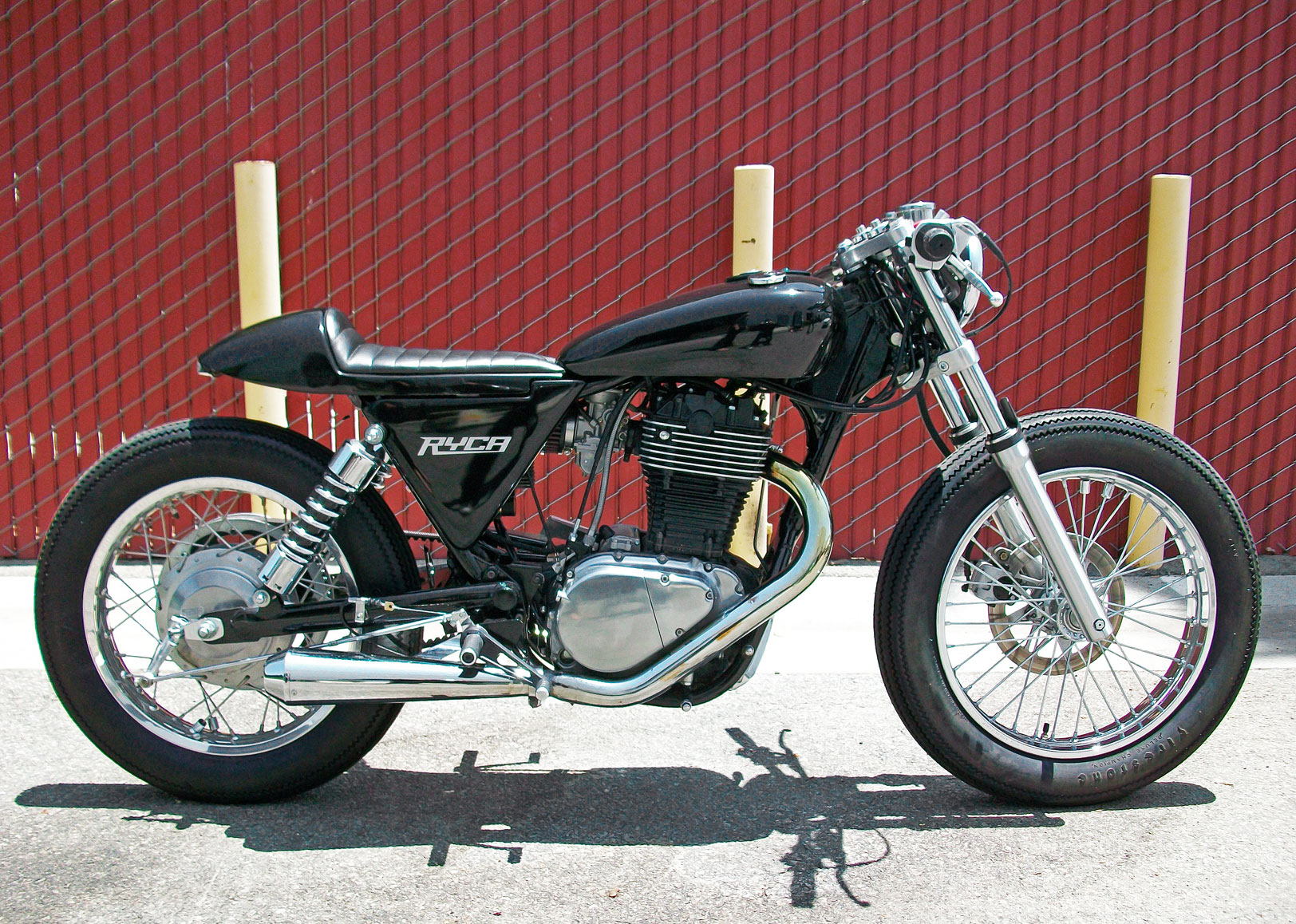
Suzuki S40 customised in a café racer style

Major manufacturers, such as BMW, Norton, Ducati and Yamaha, have responded to consumer interest in ready-to-ride café racers and have exploited this niche market. Triumph produced a turn-key retro motorcycle with their Thruxton R. Another modern cafe racer is the Ducati SportClassic, made from 2006 till 2009.

The café racer influence is apparent in the design of some electric motorcycles, for example, the TC model of Super Soco is commonly referred to as a café racer.

A shared design foundation that can frequently be found among many café racers are clip on handle bars, a flat alignment of the passenger seat and fuel tank and spoked wheels for a distinctive look.

Modern stock café racers from motorcycle factories include:

- BMW R nineT Racer
- Ducati Scrambler Café Racer
- Harley-Davidson XL1200CX Roadster
- Métisse Mk5
- Moto Guzzi V7
- Norton Commando 961 Café Racer
- Royal Enfield Continental GT 650
- Yamaha XSR900 Abarth
- Honda CB1000R Café Racer
- Honda SCL500
- Triumph Thruxton
- Kawasaki Vulcan S Cafe
- Kawasaki Z900RS Cafe
- Husqvarna Vitpilen 701
- Suzuki SV650X
- MV Agusta Superveloce 800

== See also ==
- 59 Club
- Ace Cafe London
- Outline of motorcycles and motorcycling
