= Rocker (subculture) =

Biker subculture members in the United Kingdom

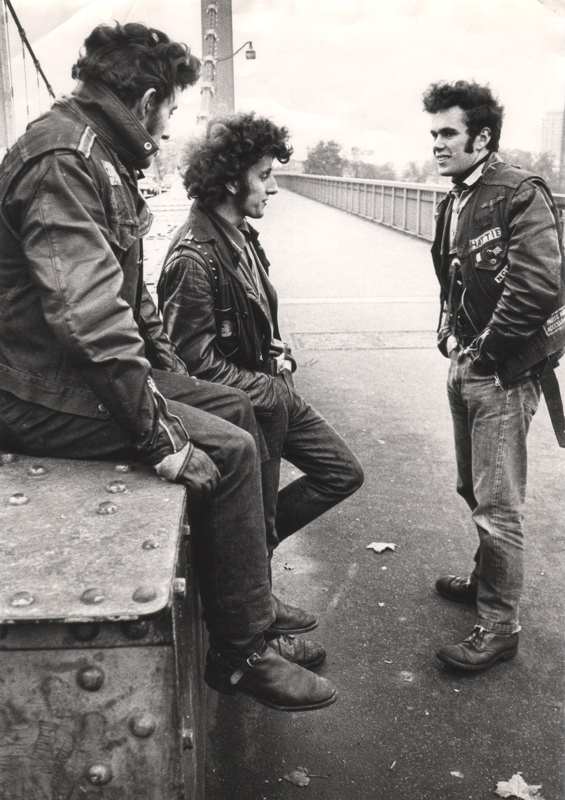
Three rockers on Chelsea Bridge

Rockers (also known as leather boys and ton-up boys) are members or followers of a rock and roll and biker subculture that originated in the United Kingdom during the late 1950s and remained popular in the 1960s, especially among youths. Rockers who rode bikes were widely known as ton-up boys for achieving a speed of 100 miles per hour (160 km/h). By 1965, the term greaser had also been introduced to Great Britain and, since then, the terms greaser and rocker have become synonymous within the British Isles, although used differently in North America and elsewhere. Rockers were also derisively known as coffee bar cowboys. Their Japanese counterpart was called the kaminari-zoku (thunder tribe/clan/group, or thunderers).

== Origins ==
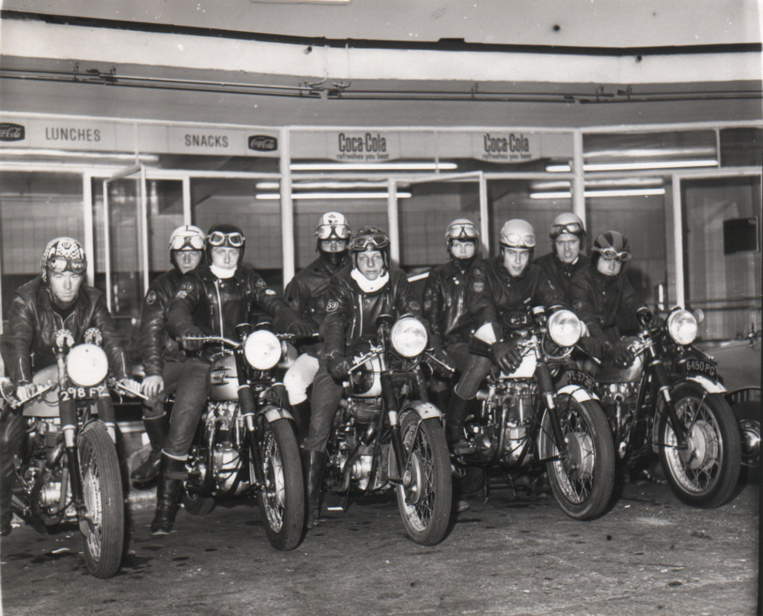
1960s Rockers under canopy outside Busy Bee Café, Watford, England

Until the post-war period, motorcycling held a prestigious position and enjoyed a positive image in British society, being associated with wealth and glamour. Starting in the 1950s, the working class were able to buy inexpensive motorcars, so that motorcycles became transport for the poor.

Many factors allowed the rocker subculture to emerge: the end of post-war rationing in the UK, a general rise in prosperity for working-class youths, the recent availability of credit and financing for young people, the influence of American popular music and films, the construction of race track-like arterial roads around British cities, the development of transport cafés, and a peak in British motorcycle engineering. During the 1950s, they were known as "ton-up boys" because doing a ton is English slang for driving at a speed of 100 mph (160 km/h) or over.

The rockers or ton-up boys took what was essentially a sport and turned it into a lifestyle, dropping out of mainstream society and "rebelling at the points where their will crossed society's". This damaged the public image of motorcycling in the UK. The mass media started targeting these socially powerless youths, creating a moral panic through exaggerated, ill-founded portrayals of them as "folk devils", loutish, scruffy, motorised cowboys, loners, or outsiders. From the 1960s on, they became more commonly known as rockers, a term previously little known outside small groups.

The rocker subculture was associated with 1950s and early-1960s rock and roll music by American artists such as Gene Vincent, Eddie Cochran, and Chuck Berry, music that George Melly called "screw and smash" music.

== Café racers ==
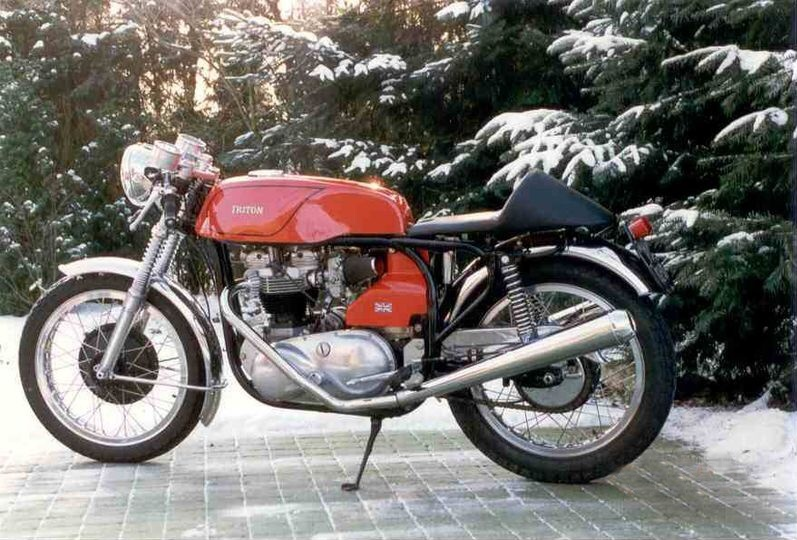
A vintage Triton motorcycle consisting of a Triumph twin-cylinder engine in a Norton Featherbed frame built in a street legal racer style with single seat, clip-on low handlebars and megaphone exhausts.

The term café racer originated in the 1950s, when bikers often frequented transport cafés, using them as starting and finishing points for road races. A café racer is a motorcycle that has been modified for speed and good handling rather than for comfort. Features include: a single racing seat, low handlebars (such as ace bars or one-sided clip-ons mounted directly onto the front forks for control and aerodynamics), large racing petrol tanks (aluminium ones were often polished and left unpainted), swept-back exhaust pipes, rear-set footpegs (to give better clearance while cornering at high speeds) with or without half or full race fairings.

These motorcycles were lean, light and handled various road surfaces well. The most defining machine of the rocker heyday was the Triton, which was a custom motorcycle made of a Norton Featherbed frame and a Triumph Bonneville engine. It used the most common and fastest racing engine combined with the best handling frame of its day. Other popular motorcycle brands included BSA, Royal Enfield and Matchless.

The term café racers is now also used to describe motorcycle riders who prefer vintage British, Italian or Japanese motorbikes from the 1950s to late 1970s. These modern café racers do not resemble the rockers of earlier decades, and they dress in a more modern and comfortable style, with only a hint of likeness to the rocker style, nor do they share the passion for 50s rock'n'roll. These modern café racers have taken elements of the American greaser, British rocker, and modern motorcycle rider styles to create a look of their own. Rockers in the 2000s tend still to ride classic British motorcycles, however, classically styled European café racers are now also seen, such as Moto Guzzi or Ducati, as well as classic Japanese bikes, some with British-made frames such as those made by Rickman.

== Characteristics ==
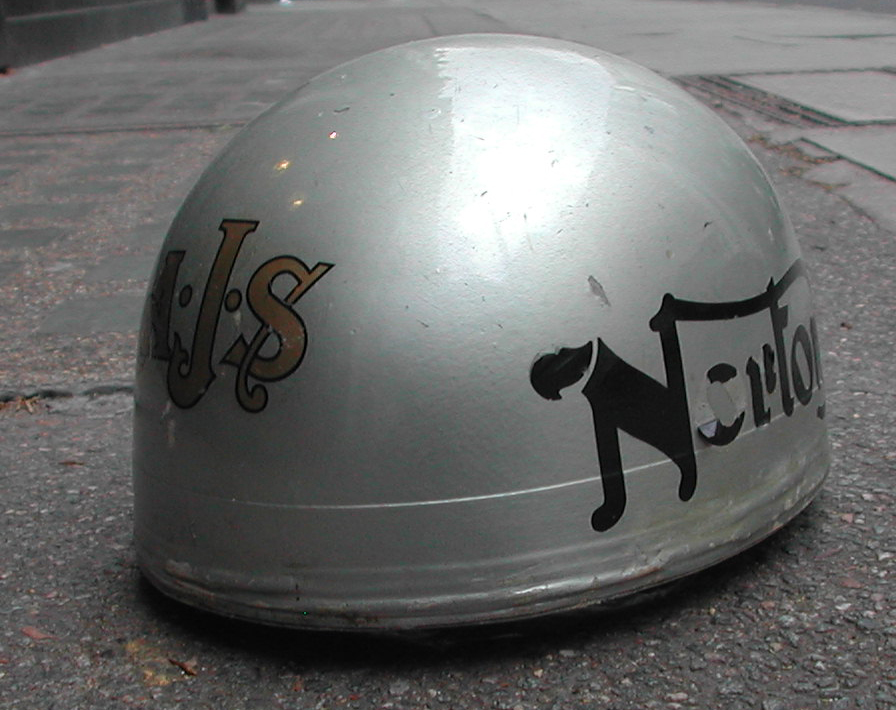
Aviakit Pudding basin helmet

Rockers bought standard factory-made motorcycles and stripped them down, tuning them up and modifying them to appear like racing bikes. Their bikes were not merely transport, but were used as an object of intimidation and masculinity projecting them uneasily close to death, an element exaggerated by their use of skull and crossbone-type symbolism.

First seen in the United States and then England, the rocker fashion style was born out of necessity and practicality. Rockers wore heavily decorated leather motorcycle jackets, often adorned with metal studs, patches, pin badges and sometimes an Esso gas man trinket. When they rode their motorcycles, they usually wore no helmet, or wore a classic open-face helmet, aviator goggles and a white silk scarf (to protect them from the elements). Other common items included: T-shirts, leather caps, Levi's or Wrangler jeans, leather trousers, tall motorcycle boots (often made by Lewis Leathers and Goldtop) or brothel creepers/beetle crushers. Also popular was a patch declaring membership of the 59 Club of England, a church-based youth organisation that later formed into a motorcycle club with members all over the world. The rocker hairstyle, kept in place with Brylcreem, was usually a tame or exaggerated pompadour hairstyle, as was popular with some 1950s rock and roll musicians.

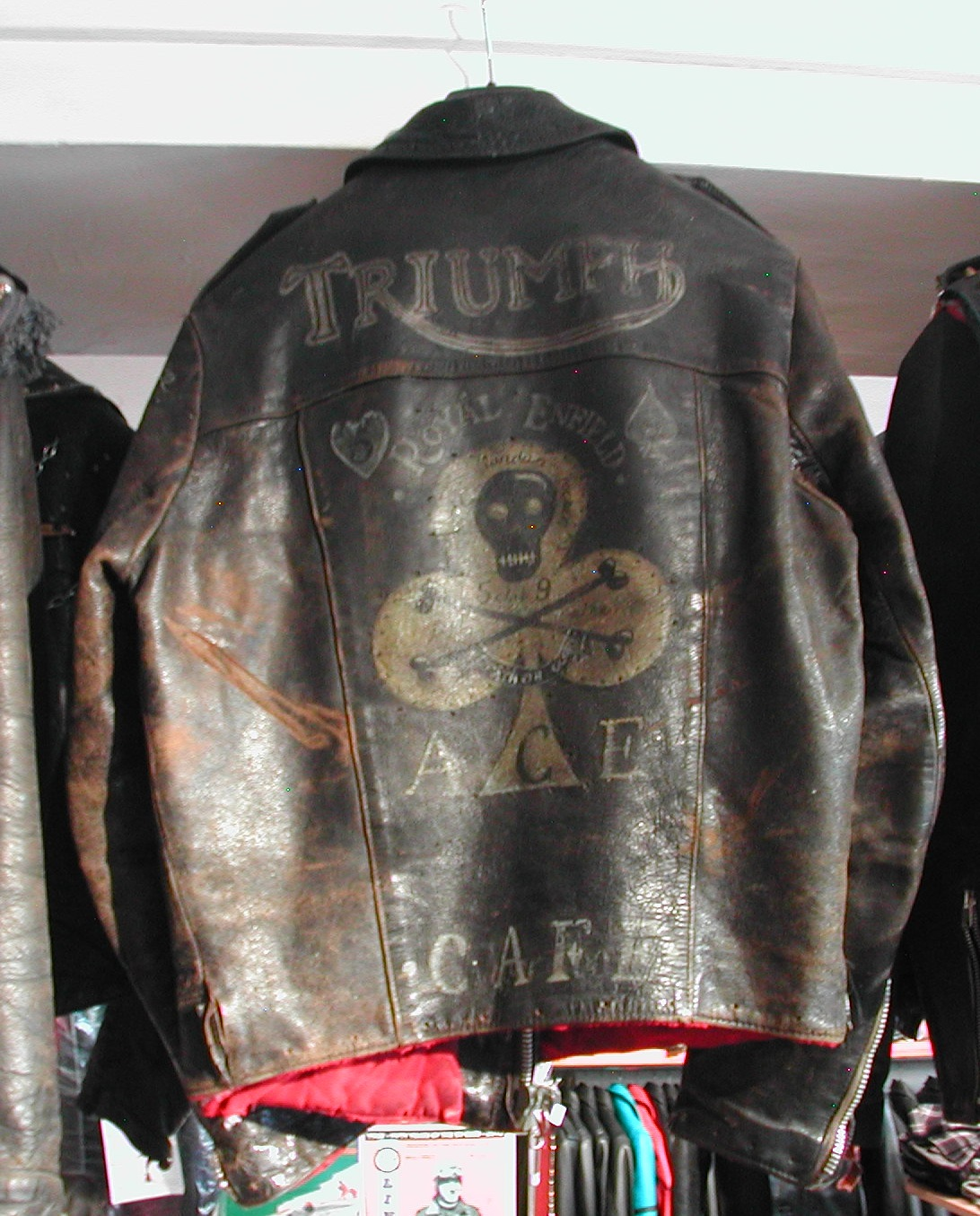
Customised Lewis Leathers motorcycle jacket with Ace Cafe details

Largely due to their clothing styles and dirtiness, the rockers were not widely welcomed by venues such as pubs and dance halls. Rockers also transformed rock and roll dancing into a more violent, individualistic form beyond the control of dance hall management. They were generally reviled by the British motorcycle industry and general enthusiasts as being as an embarrassment and bad for the industry and the sport.

Originally, many rockers opposed recreational drug use. According to Johnny Stuart:

They had no knowledge of the different sorts of drugs. To them amphetamines, cannabis, heroin were all drugs - something to be hated. Their ritual hatred of Mods and other sub-cultures was based in part on the fact that these people were believed to take drugs and were therefore regarded as sissies. Their dislike of anyone connected with drugs was intense.

== Cultural legacy ==
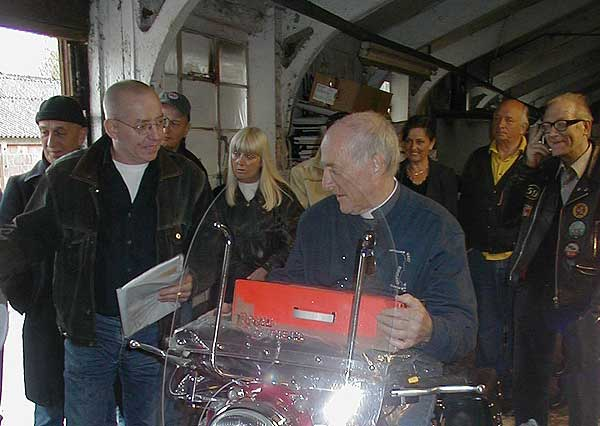
Len Paterson, founder of the Rocker Reunion movement, left, Father Graham Hullet of the 59 Club, seated on motorcycle, at Enfield Motorcycles factory, UK.

The rockers' look and attitude influenced pop groups in the 1960s, such as The Beatles, as well as hard rock and punk rock bands and fans in the late 1970s. The look of the ton-up boy and rocker was accurately portrayed in the 1964 film The Leather Boys. The rocker subculture has also influenced the rockabilly revival and the psychobilly subculture.

The English singer George Michael started using the aesthetic for his last appearance as Wham! on Top of the Pops and prominently during the more mature 1987-88 "Faith" era, wearing a black leather jacket with "Rockers Revenge" (a reference to the biker subculture) and BSA logo, a pair of Levi's jeans and leather boots combined with classic biker accessories.

Many contemporary rockers still wear engineer boots or full-length motorcycle boots, but Winklepickers (sharp pointed shoes) are no longer common. Some wear brothel creepers (originally worn by Teddy Boys), or combat boots. Rockers have continued to wear leather motorcycle jackets, often adorned with patches, studs, spikes and painted artwork; jeans or leather trousers; and white silk scarves. Leather caps adorned with metal studs and chains, common among rockers in the 1950s and 1960s, are rarely seen any more. Instead, some contemporary rockers wear a classic woollen flat cap.

== Rocker reunions ==
In the early 1970s, the British rocker and hardcore motorcycle scene fractured and evolved under new influences coming from California: the hippies and the Hells Angels. The remaining rockers became known as greasers, and the scene had all but died out.

In the early 1980s, a rockers revival was started by Lenny Paterson and a handful of original rockers. Paterson organised rocker reunion dances called piss-ups, which attracted individuals from as far as Europe. The first rocker reunion motorcycle run of 30 classic British motorcycles rode to Battersea - home of the Chelsea Bridge Boys. Following runs went to other destinations with historic relevance to rockers such as Brighton.

In 1994, Mark Wilsmore and others organised the first Ace Cafe Reunion to mark the 25th anniversary of the closure of the famous transport cafe before going on to re-opening and establishing a series of events. These events now attract up to 40,000 motorcyclists.

== Films and documentaries ==
- The Leather Boys
- BBC Home Truths
- Look at Life: Behind the Ton-Up Boys

== See also ==
- Bōsōzoku

== Bibliography ==
- Stanley Cohen; (1972). Folk Devils and Moral Panics; The Creation of the Mods and Rockers. Routledge. ISBN 0-85965-125-8.
- Johnny Stuart; (1987). Rockers!. Plexus Publishing Ltd. ISBN 0-85965-125-8
- Danny Lyons; (2003). The Bikeriders. Wild Palms 1968, Chronicle Books ISBN 0-8118-4160-X
- Winston Ramsey; (2002). The Ace Cafe then and now. After the Battle, ISBN 1870067436
- Ted Polhemus; (1994). Street Style. Thames and Hudson / V&A museum ISBN 0-500-27794-X
- Steve Wilson; (2000). Down the Road. Haynes ISBN 1-85960-651-2
- Alastair Walker; (2009) The Café Racer Phenomenon. Veloce Publishing ISBN 978-1-84584-264-2
- Horst A. Friedrichs (2010): Or Glory: 21st Century Rockers. Prestel ISBN 978-3-7913-4469-0
