= Honda GB500 =

GB500
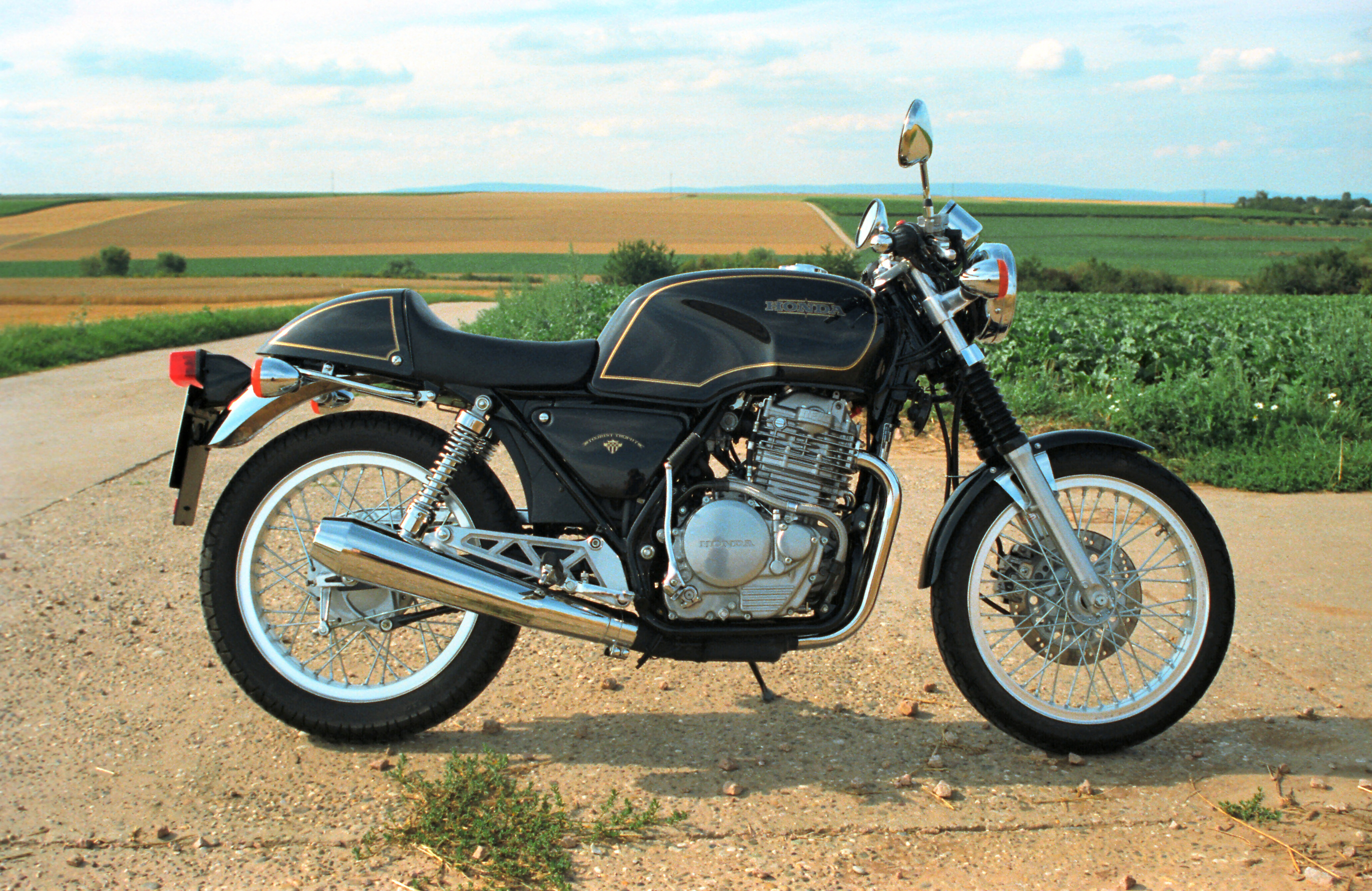
- Manufacturer: Honda
- Production: 1985–1990
- Predecessor: GB250
- Class: Café racer
- Engine: 498 cc (30.4 cu in) air-cooled RFVC 4-valve SOHC single
- Bore / stroke: 92 mm × 75 mm (3.6 in × 3.0 in)
- Compression ratio: 8.9:1
- Top speed: 108 mph (174 km/h)
- Power: 33 hp (25 kW) @ 6,500 rpm (rear wheel)
- Transmission: 5-speed
- Suspension: Front: 35 mm telescopic forks Rear: Twin shocks with adjustable pre-load
- Brakes: Front: single disc Rear: drum
- Tires: Front: 90/90-18 in Rear: 110/90-18 in
- Rake, trail: Rake: 30°, Trail: 118mm
- Wheelbase: 55.6 in (1,412 mm)
- Dimensions: L: 83 in (2,100 mm); W: 27 in (680 mm); H: 41.5 in (1,055 mm)
- Weight: 359 lb (163 kg) (dry); 390 lb (180 kg) (wet)
- Fuel capacity: 4.4 US gal (17 L; 3.7 imp gal)

The Honda GB500 'Tourist Trophy' (or TT) is an air-cooled single-cylinder solo café racer motorcycle. It was first marketed in Japan in 1985 in two 400 cc and one 500 cc versions. In 1989, Honda introduced a third 400 cc version for Japan; and in 1989 and 1990 a 500 cc version was available in the United States.

The GB500's design, mechanical configuration and café racer styling recall British 500 cc singles of the 1950s and 1960s. The GB500 TT derives its name from "Great Britain and from the Tourist Trophy (or TT), a classic 37-mile road circuit on the Isle of Man.

== Overview ==
The GB500's engine was derived from the Honda XR500RD, which has been modified with an increased flywheel mass, the addition of a self-starter, and a change from twin carburetors to a single carburetor. The overhead camshaft, single-cylinder engine was characterised by a four-valve combustion chamber in which the valve stem axes were arranged radially relative to the geometric centre of the hemispherical combustion chamber. Also featured were a tubular frame, wire-spoked wheels with polished alloy rims, solo seat, seat hump and pin-striped fuel tank.

The styling was influenced by the single-cylinder racing bikes that were prominent in the Isle of Man TT races until the later 1960s; models such as the Manx Norton, Velocette Venom, BSA Gold Star and AJS 7R. When introduced, sales were sluggish and the model did not sell well in export regions. However, today the GB500 is appreciated by a much wider market and examples in good condition command premium prices.

The motorcycle was a fine-handling machine with both electric and kick-start, the latter having a cable-operated decompressor arrangement which allowed easier starting. However, examples manufactured in 1989 and 1990 had an automatic decompressor system incorporated in the camshaft.

Japanese and non-US export models had the tank and side panels painted in dark maroon with a Honda wing decal on the tank. It was available with either a single seat with no cowl or a dual seat, the latter version having a longer footrest carrier on the left to carry a pillion footrest. It featured clip-on handlebars and the instruments mounted in vacuum-plated 'chrome' housings featured a black background with white lettering. US-model production was for model years 1989 and 1990 and featured black-green paint with gold pin-striping and lettering with a 'Honda' tank logo exclusive to the GB series. Like the Japan-market model, it had visually prominent steel-braided oil lines, steel side covers (i.e., not plastic as with the closely-related XBR500), fork gaiters, non-adjustable fork hydraulic damping and 18-inch wheels with tube-type tires.

In 1992, a third party exported 1,000 unsold Honda GB 500s from the United States to Germany (where the model is known as the "Clubman") as grey import vehicles.

Both the 400 cc and 500 cc versions were imported and sold by Honda, New Zealand. When originally released in NZ, the GB came in three models: dual seat; Mk2 with half-fairing, single seat with cowling; and no fairing, single seat.
