= Lewis Leathers =

British brand name

- Industry: Clothing, publications
- Founded: London, 1892; 134 years ago
- Founder: David Isaacs
- Headquarters: London, W1
- Area served: Worldwide
- Products: Motorcycle clothing
- Owner: Saaya Harris Nohara
- Divisions: UK, Japan, USA
- Website: www.lewisleathers.com

Lewis Leathers is a brand name of the oldest British motorcycle clothing company. D. Lewis Ltd, manufacturer of leather jackets which was established in the late 19th century.

The company supplied early aviators, motorists and motorcyclists with protective clothing against the cold and damp British climate. In the mid-1950s, D. Lewis produced the Bronx leather jacket, one of the first products aimed directly at the post-war teenage fashion market, which was widely adopted by the Ton-up Boys and Rockers of the 1960s, becoming associated with the 59 Club and sponsoring leading motorcycle and TT racers of the day.

== History ==
=== D. Lewis ===
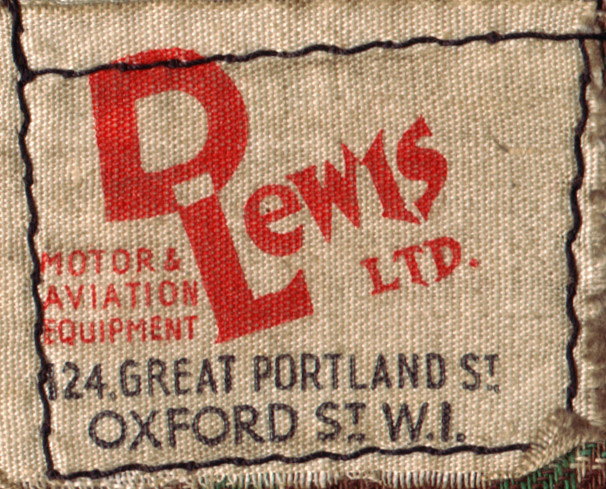
D. Lewis of Great Portland Street

Originally a family business called D. Lewis, started in 1892 as a gentlemen's outfitter or "wardrobe company", At that time, the company produced gents suiting and raincoats in the east end of London. D. Lewis became a Limited company in 1929 under the stewardship of brothers Nathan Jones, David and Lewis Isaacs on Great Portland Street in London's West End, they also had Birmingham, Sheffield and Liverpool which traded under the name of N Jones. It was during the 1910s that the company started making and retailing specialist clothing for what was then considered the "gentlemen's" sports of aviation and motoring producing their wares in Watford.

At the time, Great Portland Street was known as "Motor Row", the primary location for purchasing automobiles and related accessories in the early years of the 20th century. It had no less than 33 showrooms located along it, including companies such as: Benz Motor, Jaguar, Austin, Morgan Motor and the Indian Motorcycle Company., as well as being the center of the clothing trade.

=== Aviakit ===
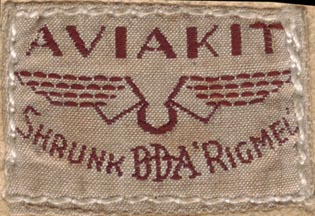
1930s Aviakit label

Initially used as a telegram address ("Aviakit Wesdo") in 1929, in 1930 the company introduced Aviakit (short for "aviation kit") as the brand name for its aviation clothing, which it had already been selling from the first quarter of the century and acting as contractors to numerous governments around the world including the Netherlands, India, Belgium, South Africa and Greece. It went on to produce clothing for the Royal Air Force (RAF) during World War II including made to measure outfits for officers. The product line was also to include boots, goggles, and crash helmets identical to those made by Everoak.

Its garments were worn by Spitfire test pilot Sir Alex Henshaw and RAF fighter pilots during World War II. The name still appears in Lewis Leathers jackets, boots, gloves and other products to this day.

=== Post-World War II ===
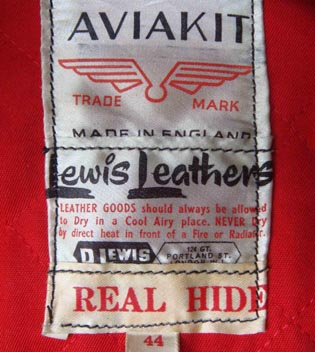
1960s Aviakit label

Following the end of hostilities, although handicapped by petrol rationing, D. Lewis started selling ex-RAF clothing to de-mobbed motorcyclists and then, in the early 1950s as rationing ended, started to develop more casual items into their ranges, expanding into shops in Sheffield, Birmingham and St Albans. By 1953, its advertising claims were that the company was already the largest motorcycle clothing and accessory company in the UK and abroad.

The company's products came to represent the high end of the market, out of reach of many individuals, also serving the circuit racing fraternity offering repair and replacement right hand boots which commonly wore out on England's clockwise racing circuits.

=== Lewis Leathers ===
It was not until 1960 that the company registered the name by which it soon became most commonly known, 'Lewis Leathers'. This brand name was introduced on a new range of leather jackets aimed at the youth market and, in 1962, it aligned itself with the burgeoning 59 Club in London, Hackney Wick. As the Mods and Rockers clashed at English seaside resorts, Lewis Leather clothing was to be seen on both sides of the conflict.

In 1982, the company was sold to the Newbold Brothers; it was then sold to Richard Lyon in November 1986. In 1991 its classic designs were to be researched and re-created by Derek Harris. After trading from the same location for 101 years, the Great Portland Street shop closed in 1993. That same year saw the launch of a small 'Retro Range' of Lewis Leathers jackets with lining, labels and hardware all as found on the jackets seen during the 60s and 70s. The release of this range and its subsequent marketing in Japan, USA and the UK coincided with vintage Lewis Leathers jackets becoming increasingly sought after in Japan where they are promoted for their authentic connections to the rockers of the 60s, leading British Punks, Rock musicians and fashion icons, and are often highly customised.

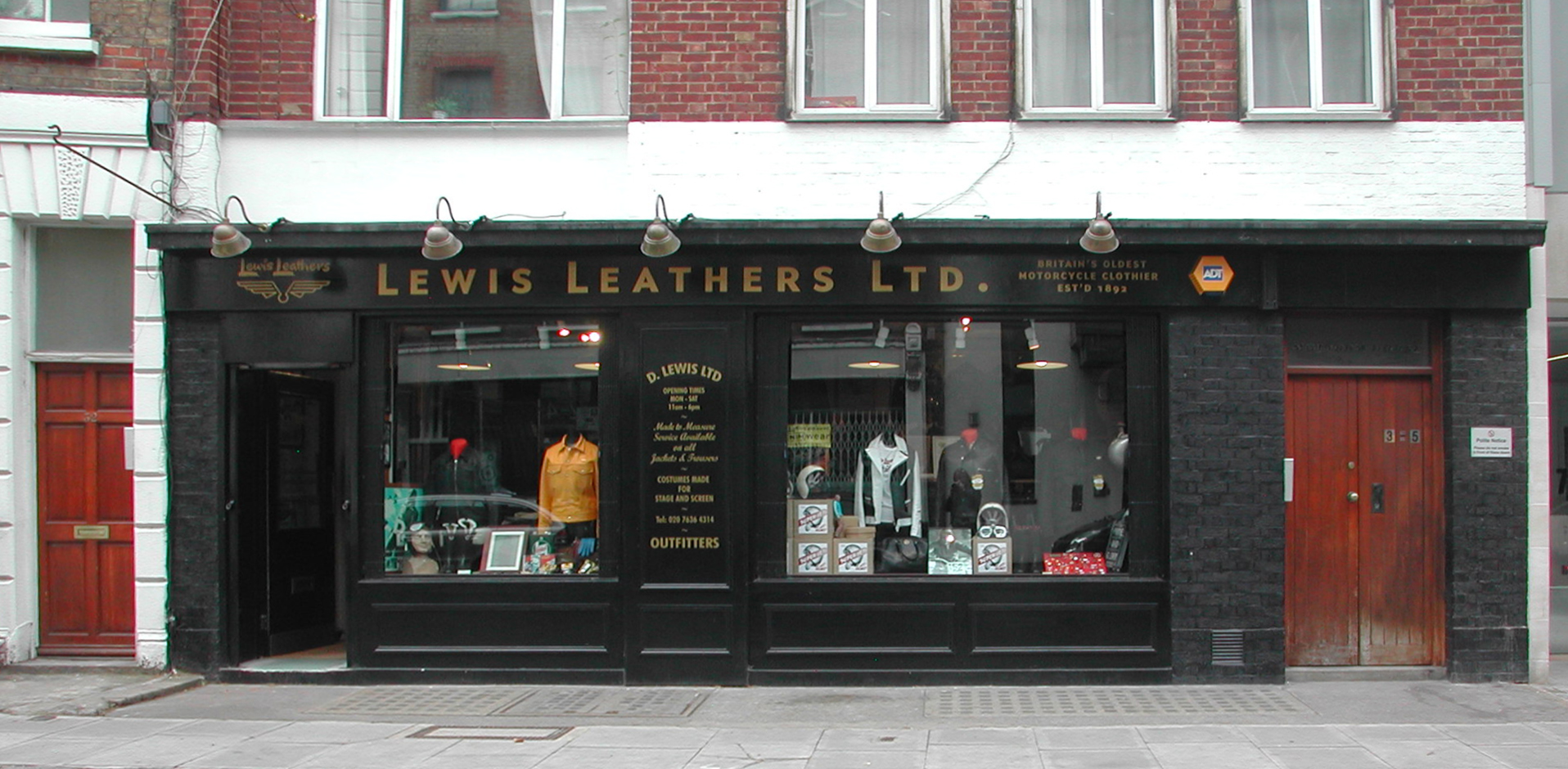
Lewis Leathers shop, Whitfield Street, London in 2013

Harris and Lyon continued to expand the range of authentic retro-styled jackets, their efforts leading to collaborations with leading fashion designers such as Comme des Garçons in 2002. In 2003 Lyon announced his retirement leading to Harris, whom, after 12 years researching and working on its designs, took over the company and established an office in Japan opened by 59 Club Japan leader, Koji Baba. The London branch was re-opened close to the original premises in Whitfield Street, part of London's Fitzrovia.

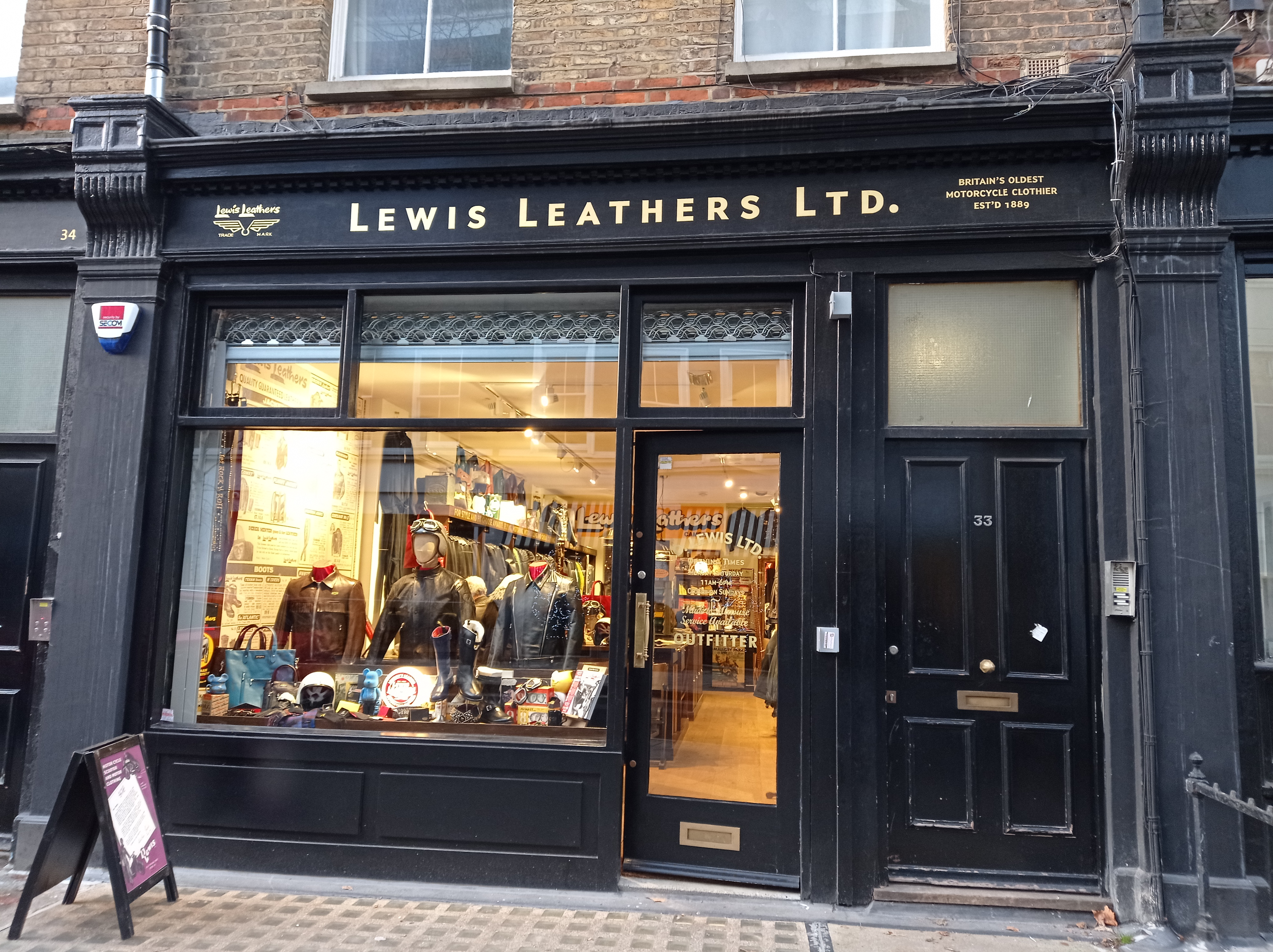
Lewis Leathers in Windmill Street, London, 2023

D. Lewis Ltd and Lewis Leathers garments were always produced in England, initially in Watford or St Albans, and from 1958 to 1982, in Copperfield Rd, East London. In the 1970s, a small factory in Sheffield was also used. In 1982 all production was moved to Northampton, returning to London in 1993 where it remains until the present date.

From the late 1950s, Lewis Leathers advertised to motorcyclists and also in popular musical publications such as the NME and Melody Maker. Lewis Leathers were also official suppliers to police motorcyclists in the UK.

== Bronx jacket ==
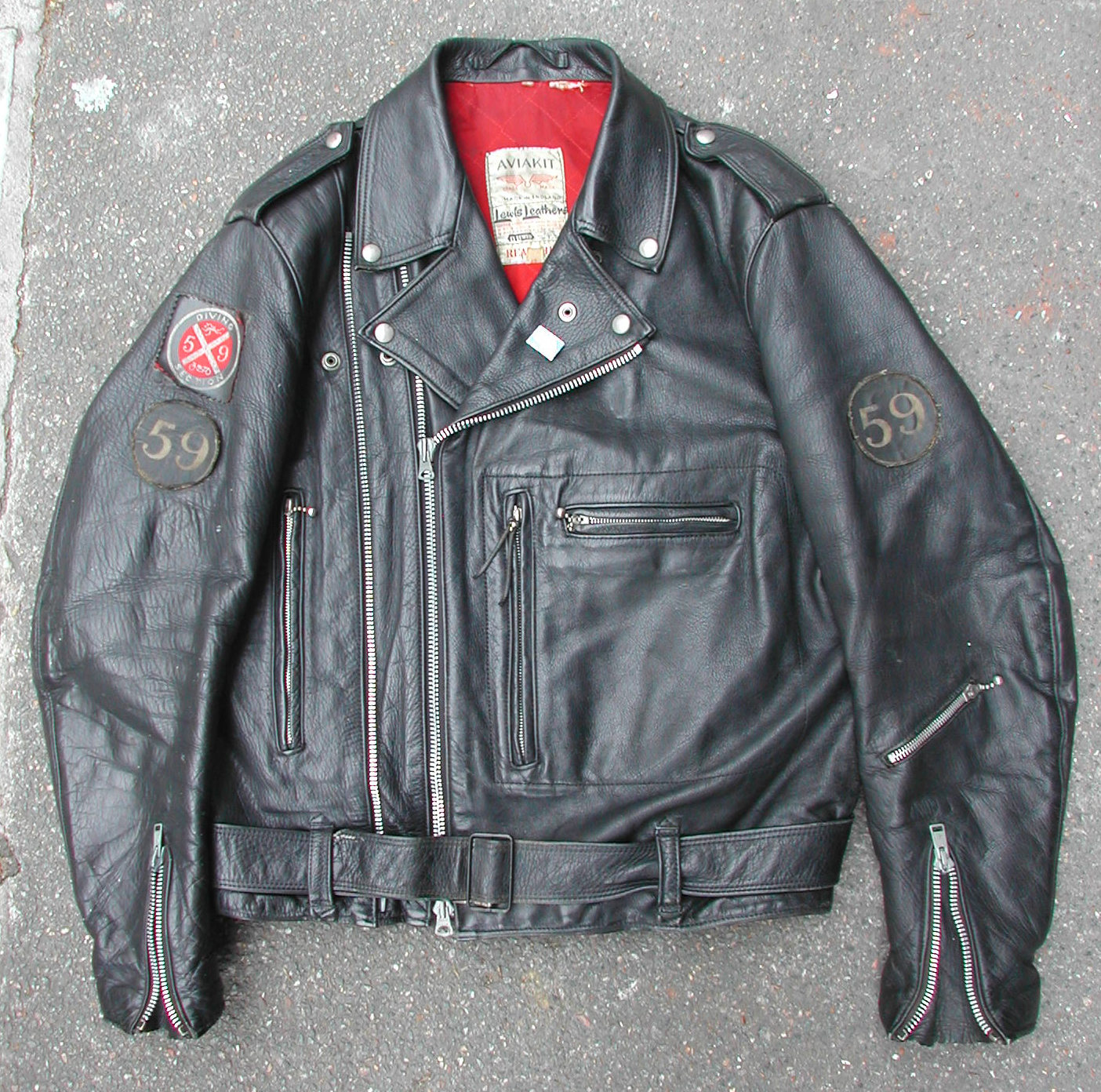
Vintage Lewis Leathers Aviakit Super Bronx twin track jacket

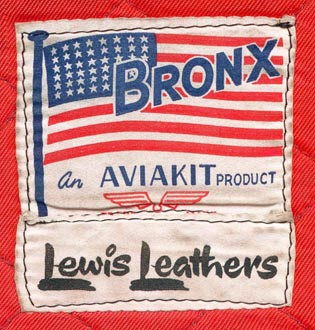
1950s Lewis Leathers Bronx label

While still advertising itself to the flying market, in May 1956 D. Lewis launched its most iconic jacket, the Bronx Jacket, an update of a 1930s flying jacket. Aimed at the teenage market, following the effect of the banning of Marlon Brando's movie The Wild One, the Bronx was to become the British equivalent of the Schott Perfecto. Coinciding with the huge increase in popularity of motorcycling and the Mods and Rockers era, the company continued to expand its range of black leather jackets which also started to appeal to fashion conscious rebels.

The Lewis Leather jackets differed from their American counterparts such as the Perfecto motorcycle jacket in that during the mid-1950s in the United Kingdom, many young riders were influenced by the riding style of their racing heroes, which was crouched right over the tank, arms forward holding onto clip-on handle bars. In order to wear an American style jacket, various modifications needed to be made such as expansion pleats down each side of the back and the buckle had to be covered in leather, as the brass buckles found on most American styles would have scratched the tank.

It became the jacket of choice for the rocker generation and is still in production more than 40 years later.

A further development of the original Bronx jacket was the Super Bronx Twin Track version with an additional zip-track fitted allowing it to expand, enabling the rider to wear bulkier warm clothing in winter.

First appearing at the September 1965 Brighton motorcycle show, it was designated 440TT, with the advertising legend proclaiming "unobtainable elsewhere", and together with the standard Bronx designated 384, the two variants continued in the range from 1966.

== Other models and products ==
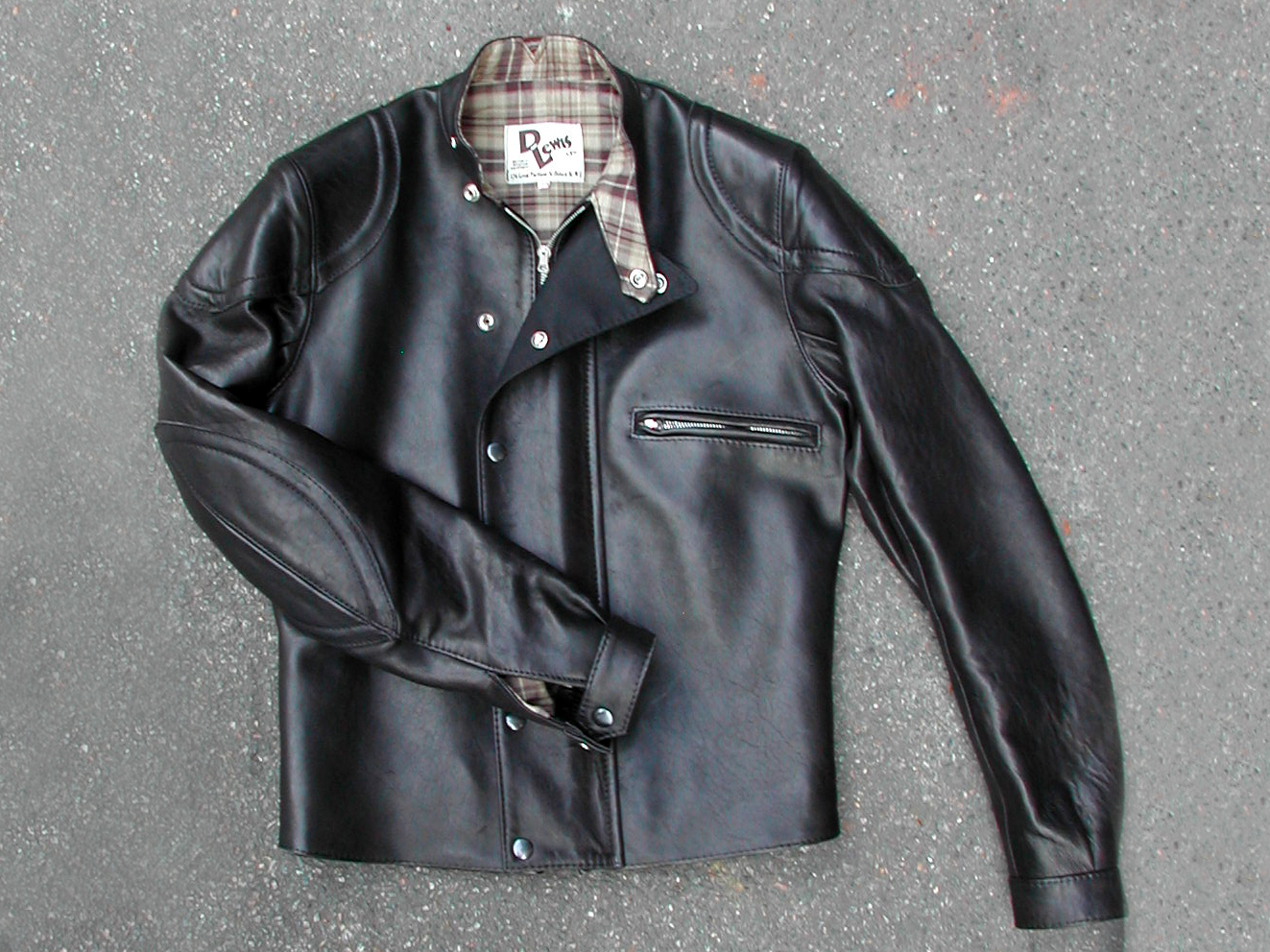
Vintage style Lewis Leathers Universal Racer mk2 jacket

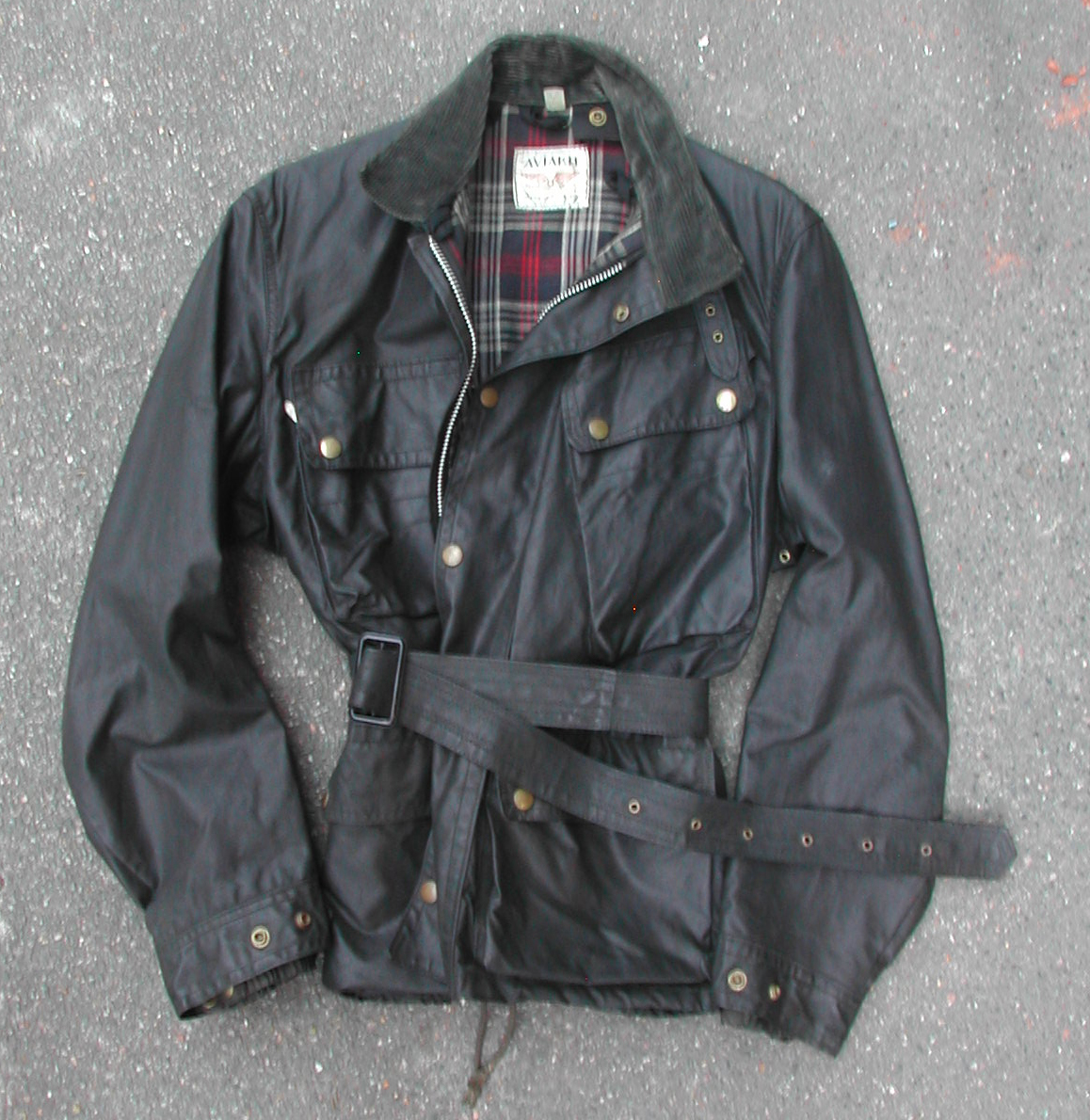
Lewis Leathers Aviakit wax cotton jacket

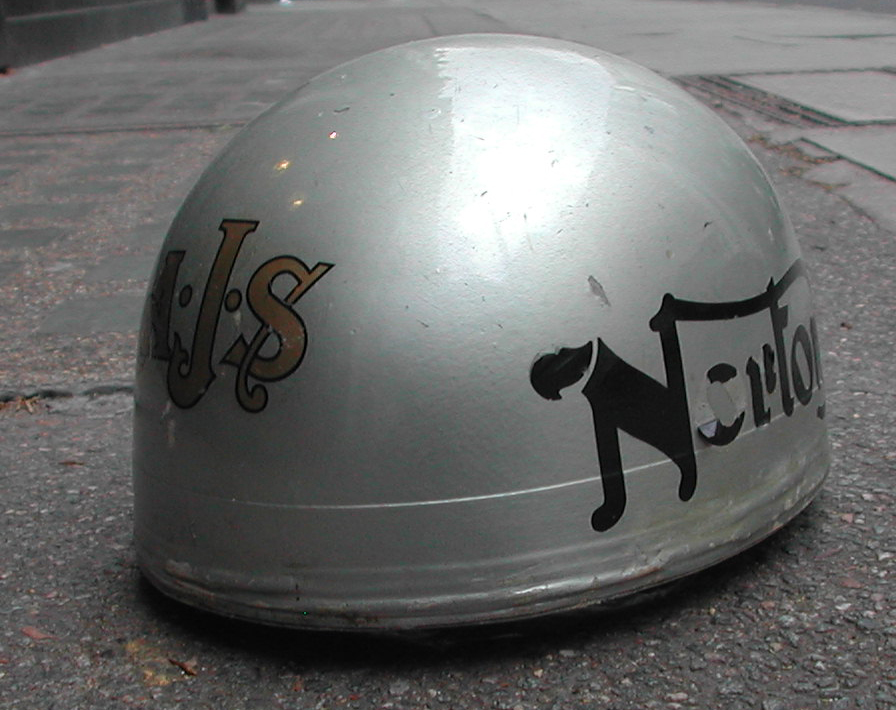
Aviakit Pudding basin helmet

Other jacket designs included the Dominator, famously worn by Sid Vicious; the Lightning, worn by Steve Jones and Iggy Pop; the Cyclone, worn by Chrissie Hynde of The Pretenders; the Corsair; and a cheap plastic replica called the 'Bomber'. Other products included helmets, wax cotton waterproof clothing, boots, T-shirts, gloves, goggles and other motorcycle related items such as scarves and face-masks.

== Lewis Leathers in popular culture ==
The influence of the D. Lewis brands Aviakit and Lewis Leathers spread beyond the UK to Europe and Japan and to wherever there were British motorcycle scenes. It advertised widely in the US, selling via mail order, becoming popular amongst leading motorcycle journalists, and achieved a legendary status for its connection to the 'folk devil' Ton Up Boys and the 59 Club. which it attended fortnightly during its heyday and sponsored.

It became known for pioneering its large colour brochure, for producing coloured as well as black leathers, initially used for road racing from 1966 by Derek Minter in 1966 and Colin Seeley in 1967, and for producing both aviation and motorcycle clothing for women since the 1930s.

Lewis Leathers jackets have been worn by leading British punk and rock musicians, and fashion icons such as the members of The Damned, The Sex Pistols, Arctic Monkeys, The Clash, Motörhead, The Beatles, The Rolling Stones, The Prodigy, Eric Clapton, Ewan McGregor and Kate Moss, as well as iconic Americans such as Lou Reed, Joan Jett, Johnny Thunders, The Ramones, members of Suicide, The Hives and others.

They have been used in music videos, customised as fashion statements by designers such as Vivienne Westwood and Malcolm Maclaren of Seditionaries, as costumes in theatrical productions by Derek Jarman, and used in fashion shoots in magazines such as Vogue. They were worn by such leading British counter-culture figures as Mick Farren, and their purchase was portrayed as a rite of passage by authors such as Robert Elms.

On its 120th anniversary, the company was featured in a guide to the most influential fashion shops in London.

It retails through high class clothing stores internationally, and has produced a range of custom jackets for a Rolling Stones tour.

It maintains a large collection of vintage items and documentation from which it takes its references.

== Sponsorship ==
Lewis Leathers have sponsored and outfitted a number of motorcycle teams such as the British and USA International Six Days Trials (ISDT) teams, the latter including, in 1964, Steve McQueen. Other sportsmen who were either sponsored by or endorse Lewis Leather clothing include Derek Minter, Giacomo Agostini, John Cooper, Phil Smart, Mike Hailwood, Colin Seeley and Bill Ivy.

The company has also collaborated with Royal Enfield Motors and Triumph Motorcycles to produce a range of jackets.
