= MV Agusta Superveloce =

Italian retro racer styled motorcycle

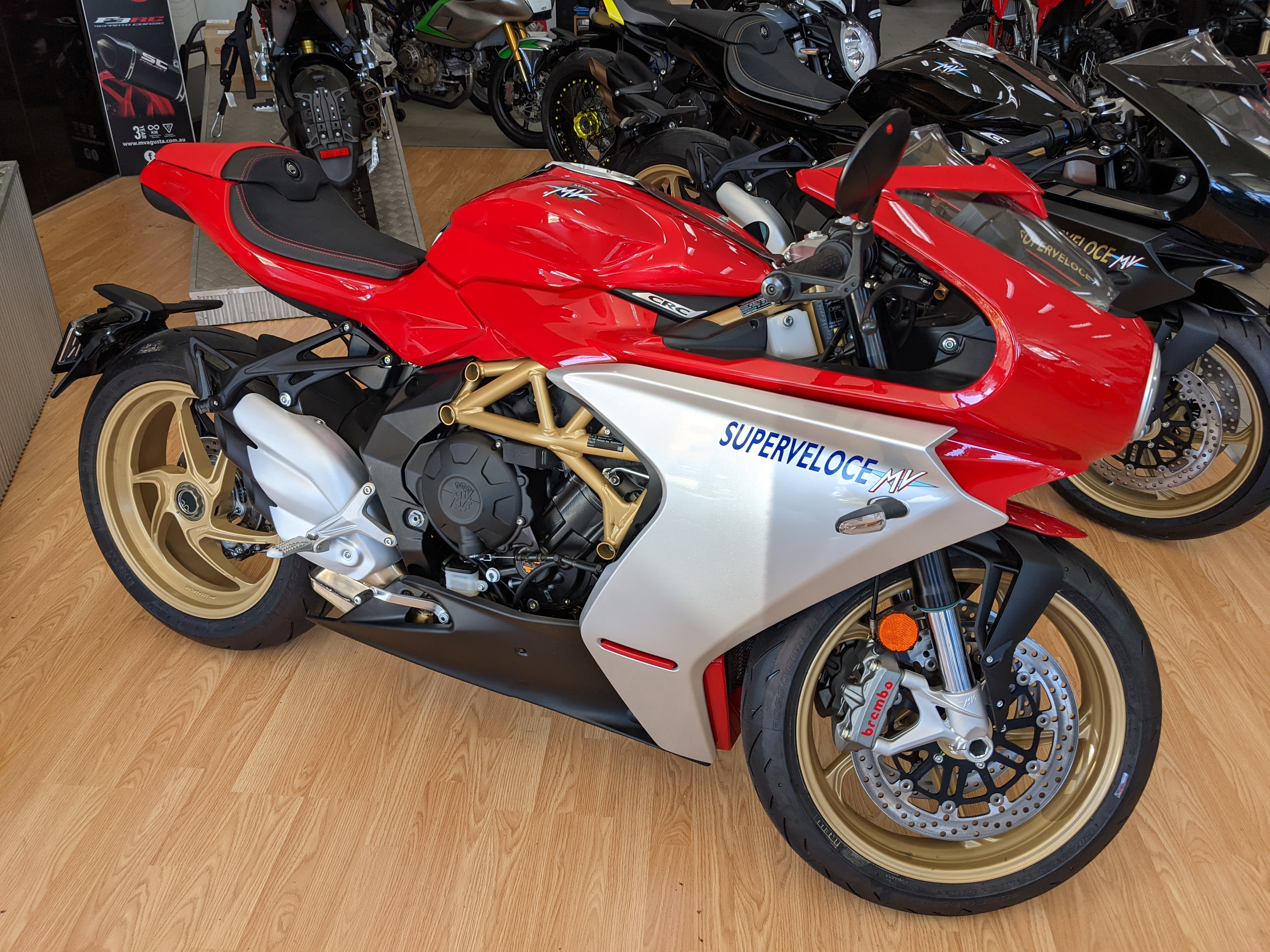
- MV Agusta Superveloce 800 2020 model
- Manufacturer: MV Agusta
- Production: 2020
- Class: Sport bike
- Engine: 4-stroke, 12-valve, DOHC straight-three; 798 cc or 998 cc
- Bore / stroke: 79 mm x 54.3 mm
- Top speed: 285 km/h (177 mph)
- Power: 800: 148 PS (109 kW) at 13,000 rpm; 1000: 208 PS (153 kW) at 13,000 rpm
- Torque: 88 N⋅m (65 lb⋅ft) at 10,600 rpm
- Transmission: Wet multi-plate slipper clutch, 6 gears, chain drive
- Frame type: Lattice
- Suspension: Front: Telescopic forks Rear:Single-sided swingarm with single shock absorber
- Brakes: Disc brakes
- Weight: 381 lb (173 kg) (dry)
- Related: MV Agusta F3 800

The MV Agusta Superveloce is a Café racer styled motorcycle produced by the Italian motorcycle manufacturer MV Agusta since 2020. It is described by MV Agusta as "a modern interpretation of the iconic stylistic concept of the MV Agusta. A fusion of vintage and contemporary ensures that the future incorporates the memories of good times gone by".

== Background ==
Based on the F3 800, the Superveloce was first exhibited as a concept at the 2018 EICMA Show in Milan where it was awarded "Most Beautiful Bike of the Show”. MV Agusta were invited to exhibit the machine at the Concorso d'Eleganza Villa d'Este, where it won first prize in the “Concept Bike: New Design and Prototype category presented by Independent Manufacturers and Designers” class.

Using the social network platform Instagram, MV Agusta announced on 19 May 2019 that the Superveloce would go into production in 2020. On 29 May they announced that pre-orders were being taken for the 300 Serie Oro production run, and by 26 June all 300, had been reserved. The first units were expected to go into production in March 2020. At the November 2019 EICMA Show two versions of the machine were unveiled: the limited edition Superveloce 800 Serie Oro which was almost indistinguishable from the concept bike and the full production Superveloce 800. MV Agusta also announced that production of the Superveloce had begun.

== Overview ==
Using the F3 800 Supersport as the base, MV design director, Adrian Morton, sought to give a modern take on the iconic MV three-cylinder GP machines of the 1960s and 70s as ridden to world championships by riders Giacomo Agostini and Phil Read.

An exclusive merchandising line will be available; including backpacks, jackets and helmets.

=== Engine ===
The 799 cc engine, originally designed by Ezio Mascheroni and first fitted to the F3, uses a DOHC inline three-cylinder layout with four valves per cylinder. A counter-rotating (reverse) crankshaft is used, which counteracts the centripetal forces of the wheels allowing the bike to turn faster. The bore and stroke are 79 and 54.3 mm (3.11 and 2.14 in).

=== Electronics ===
The machine uses a number of advanced technologies in the state of the art engine and vehicle control electronics; including ride by wire, multi-maps and traction control. A TFT dashboard is fitted, which has dedicated graphs and new functions. Headlight and tail light are large round items, adding to the retro-look, and are powered by LEDs. The headlight features an advanced twin-function full LED poly-ellipsoidal design, complete with a daytime running light.

=== Cycle parts ===
The tubular steel/aluminium frame is the same as the F3 800 as are the Marzocchi forks and Brembo brakes. A new rear sub-frame is fitted that allows changing the bike from a single seat to a dual seat if required.

== Model variants ==
=== Superveloce 800 Serie Oro ===
The Superveloce 800 Serie Oro was the first of the model line to be announced and was limited to 300 units, all of which were reserved before production started in 2020.

The bike has carbon fibre bodywork, including the fairing, which reflects the style of the Ago era and has a yellow tinted screen. The lightweight bodywork contributes to the 381 lb (173 kg) dry weight. New six-spoke wheels are fitted.

The machine uses a SC Projects 3-into-1-into-3 exhausts, two pipes exiting on the right and one on the left. This configuration is the same as on the classic MV GP machines. The exhaust boosts power to 153 bhp (115 kW).

A leather strap is used to secure the petrol tank to the frame front and rear, and features a machined filler cap.

=== Superveloce 800 75 Anniversario ===
The limited edition MV Agusta Superveloce 75 Anniversario model to mark the 75 anniversary of MV Agusta was announced in November 2020. Features included a tri colour paint job, a red seat and gold highlights and a three-tipped Arrow race exhaust. Only 75 were manufactured, each with a numbered aluminum plate on the steering head and a certificate of authenticity.

=== Superveloce 800 2020 model ===
The full-production Superveloce 800 uses thermoplastic bodywork rather than the carbon fibre of the Serie Oro to bring the cost of the machine down. Tank and wheels are from the F3. An exhaust similar to the F3 is used, with three overlapping pipes on the right side. Two colours are available - "Ago" red with silver livery and a black/dark grey finish.

The production version of the Superveloce 800 was released in late 2020.

Although developing the same 148 bhp (109 kW) as the F3, a different exhaust and revised engine mapping of the ECU give the machine better mid-range power.

=== Superveloce 800 Alpine ===
On 10 December 2020 Alpine and MV Agusta announced that they would make a special edition of the MV Agusta Superveloce influenced by the Alpine A110 called the Superveloce 800 Alpine. Approximately 110 models were made and rapidly sold out.

=== Superveloce S ===
MV Agusta released details for the 2021 Superveloce models on 7 April 2021. Upgrades to the Superveloce 800 included Euro 5 compliance, new engine components, redesigned exhaust system and matching software for the ECU, redesigned lateral frame plates for more rigidity, revised front suspension settings, an upgraded electronics with a new inertial measurement unit (IMU), a new quick shifter and a new twin flow oil radiator. Two colour schemes are available - Ago Red and Silver combination and Pearl Metallic Yellow.

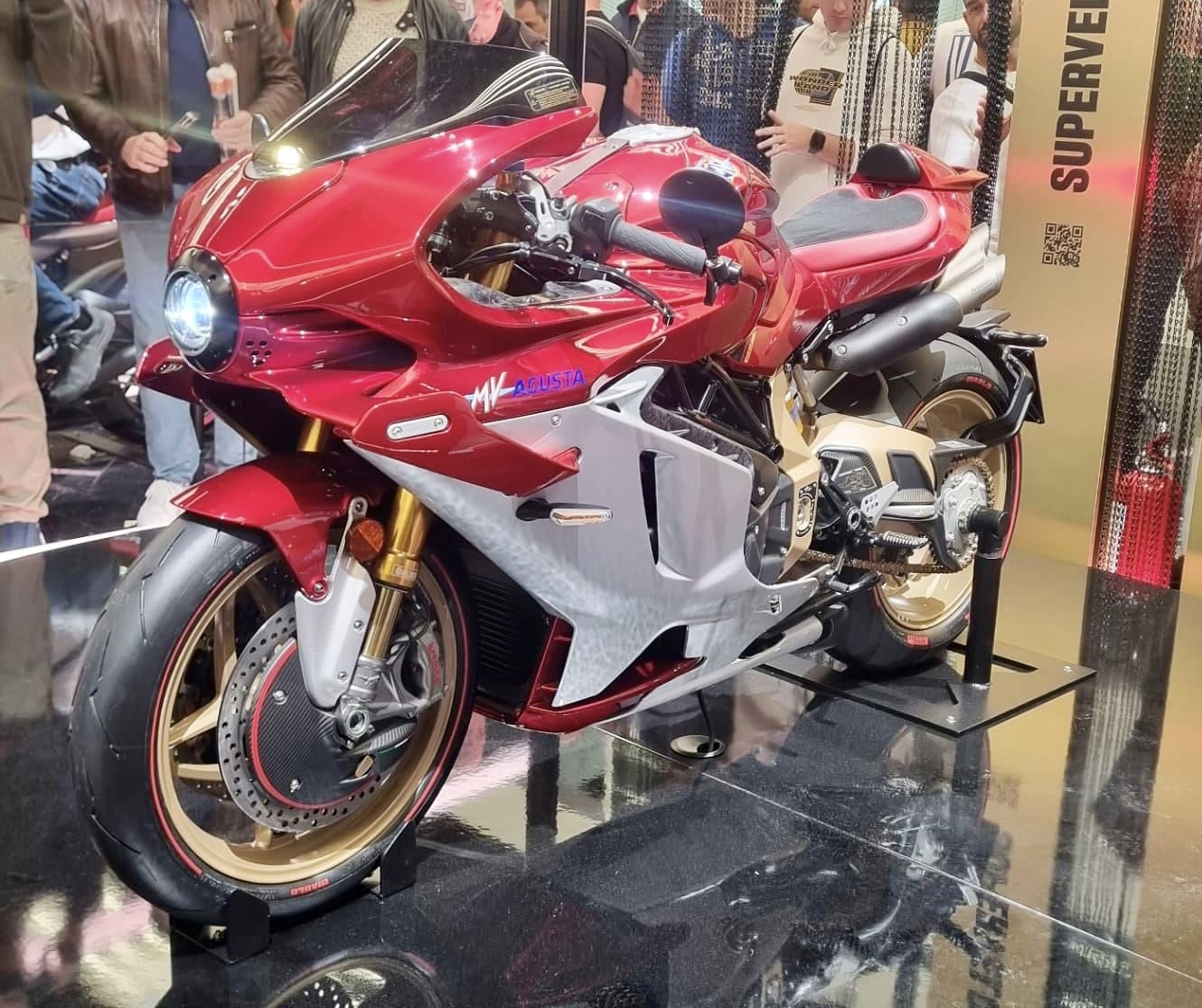
MV Agusta Superveloce 1000S

A new Superveloce S model shares that same base but is white with gold decals and has spoked tubeless wheels and a special leather seat. A racing kit is available that includes a tail cover, an Arrow exhaust and an appropriately mapped ECU.

=== Superveloce Ago ===
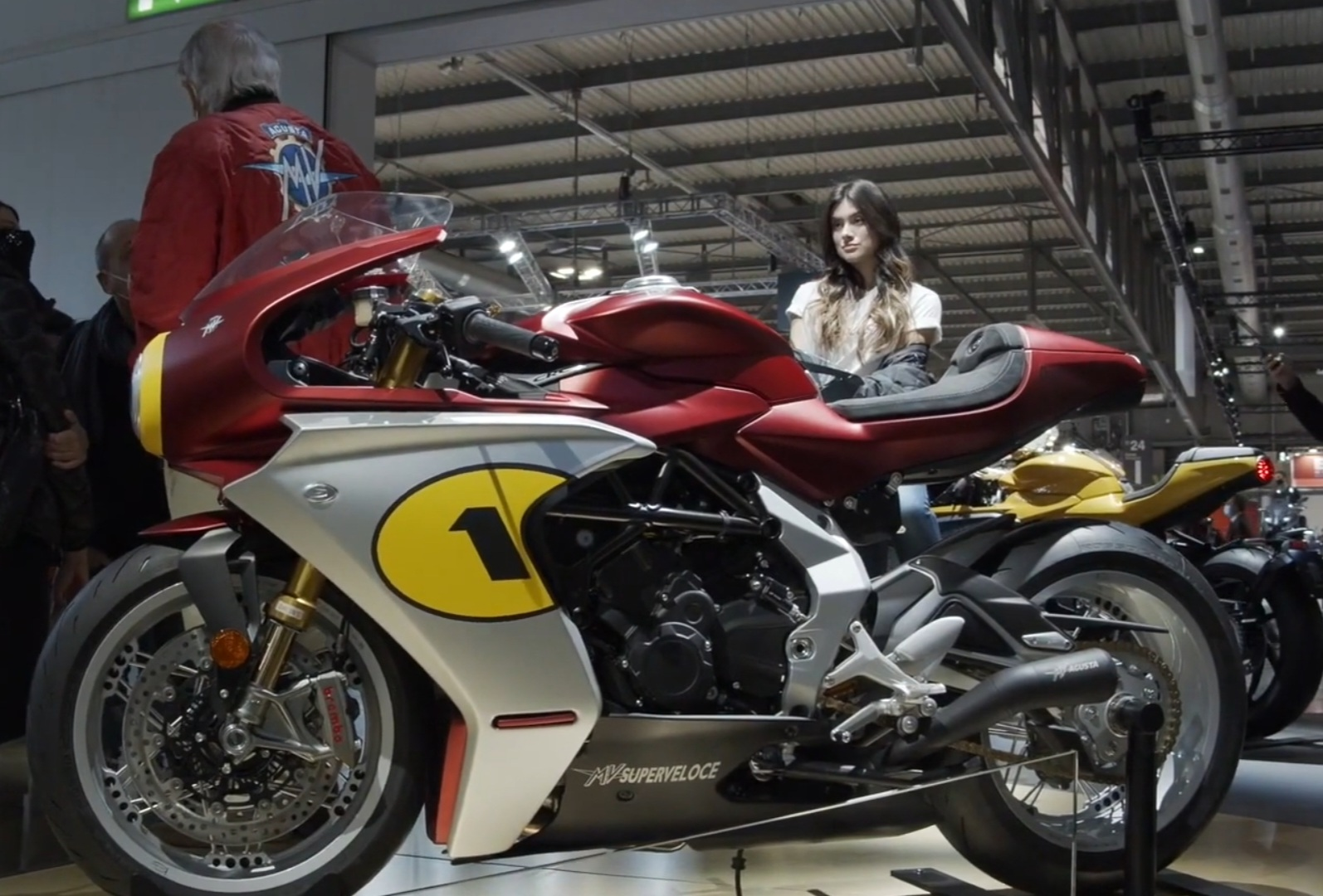
MV Agusta Superveloce Ago

MV Agusta announced the production of 311 handcrafted Superveloce Ago machines in October 2021, the first 15 of which are dedicated to Agostini's 15 world titles. The Superveloce Ago features include: upgraded suspension components; carbon fibre body components; the upper triple clamp, the shift pedal and the rear brake pedal are machined from aluminum billet; unique wire wheels; and a new six-axis inertial platform (IMU). A racing kit is available that includes a three-pipe Arrow exhaust combined with a dedicated ECU, which increases the power to 151 horsepower.

=== Superveloce 1000 Serie Oro ===
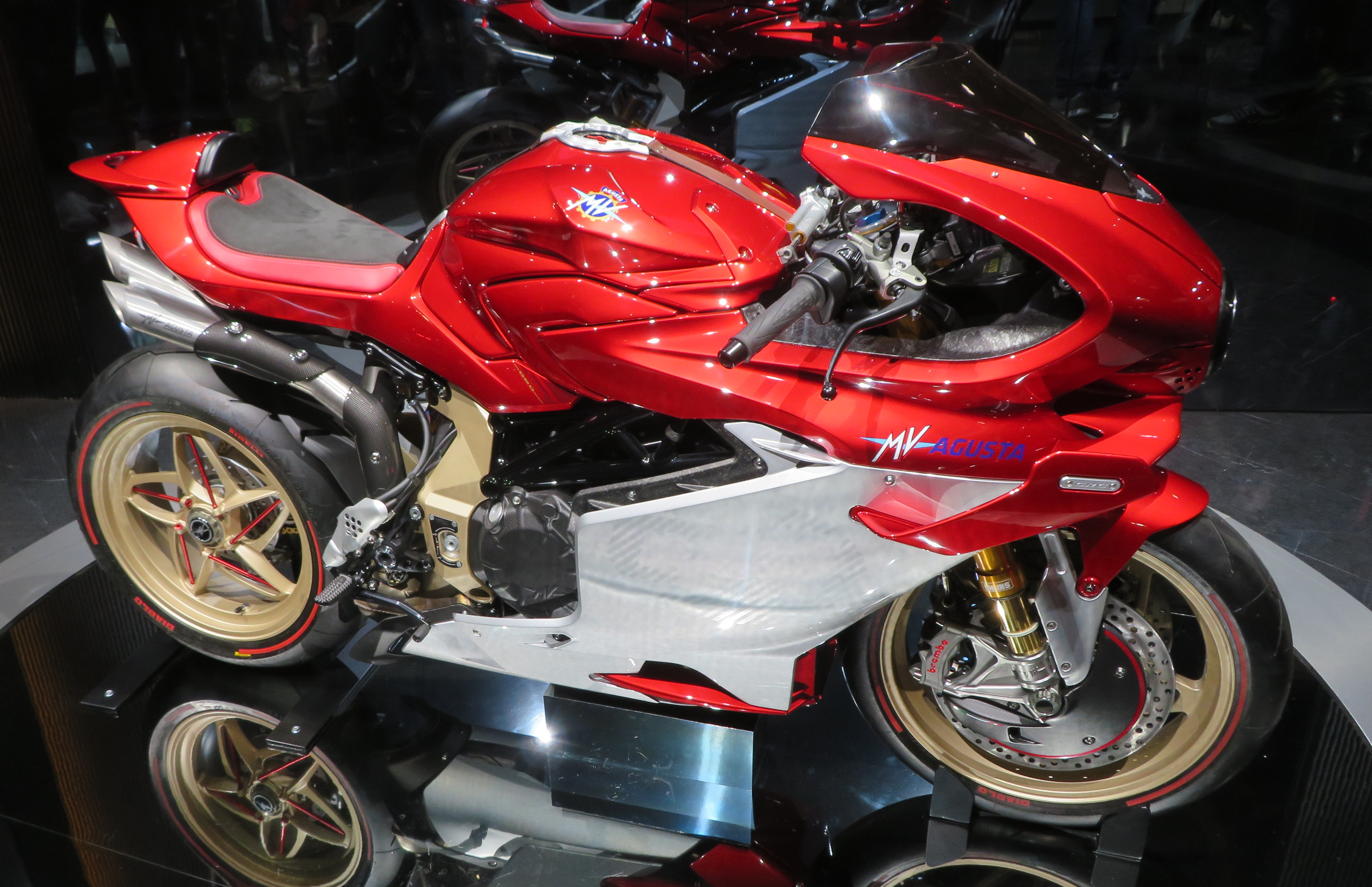
MV Agusta Superveloce 1000 Serie Oro

The limited edition Superveloce 1000 Serie Oro was announced by MV Agusta in early November 2022. It is based on the Brutale 1000 RR and has a 998 cc inline-four engine with an updated second balance shaft that produces 208 PS (153 kW) at 13,000 rpm. Other features include electronic Öhlins suspension and carbon fibre bodywork.

=== Superveloce 1000 Ago ===
Another limited-edition Ago model was announced by MV Agusta in June 2025. The bike coincides with MV Agusta's 80th anniversary and celebrates the career of Giacomo Agostini, with each bike personally signed by the famous racer. The fuel tank strap features a gold plaque that reads 15 Titoli Mondiali ("15 World Titles") in celebration of Agostini's career. Production is limited to 83 units to celebrate his 83rd birthday. To deepen the contribution to Agostini, pieces of his racing trophies have been melted down and incorporated into the ignition key for each motorcycle.

Like the previous 1000 Serie Oro, the 1000 Ago shares its 998 cc inline-four engine with the Brutale 1000 RR, producing 208 PS (153 kW) at 13,000 rpm before topping out at a 14,000 rpm redline. To achieve this, the engine features titanium valves and connecting rods and a diamond-like coating on the camshafts. The 1000 Ago also features electronic Öhlins suspension and carbon fiber bodywork, as well as a comprehensive electronics suite.
