= Mike Seate =

American journalist

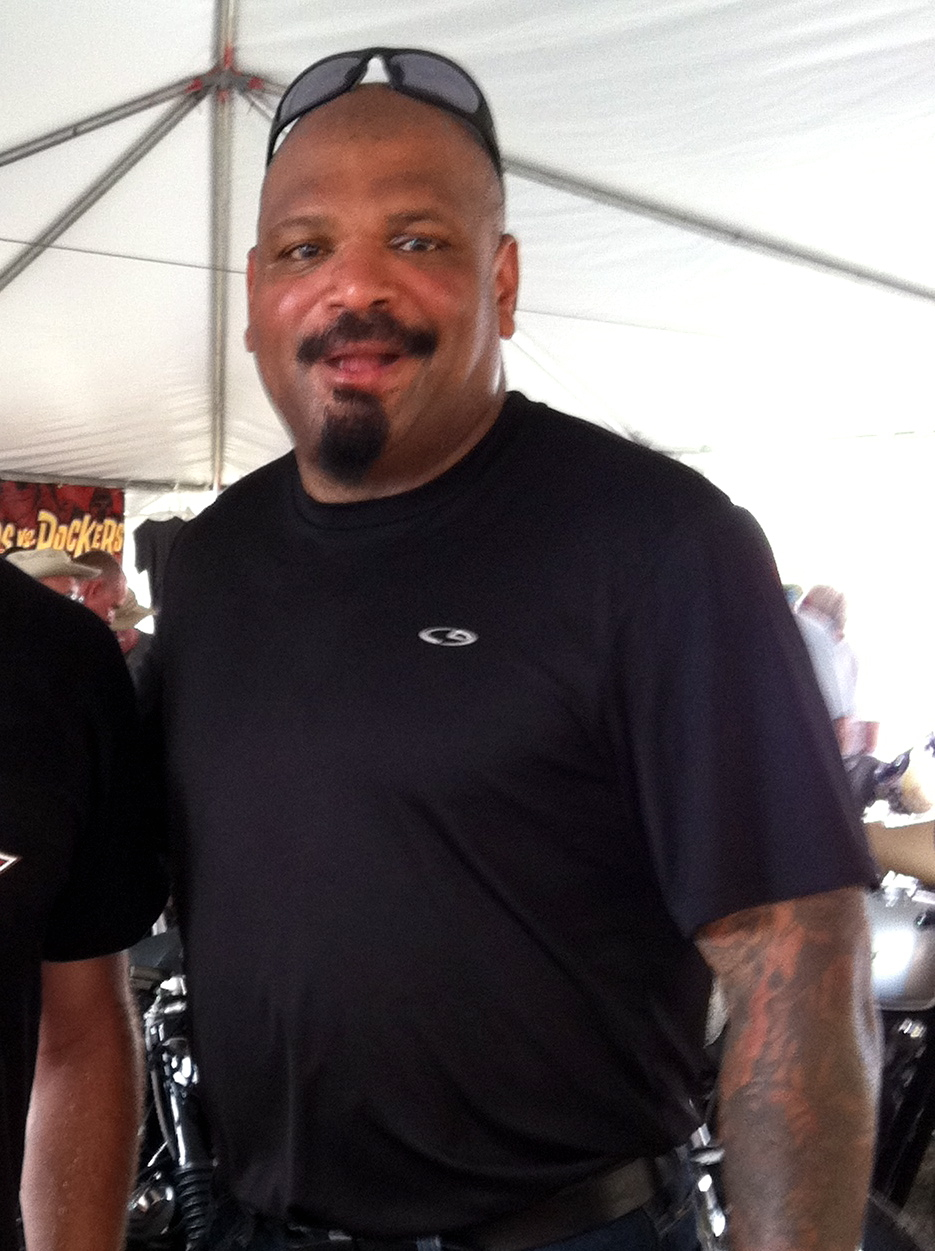
- Seate in 2011
- Born: 1965 (age 60–61); Pittsburgh, Pennsylvania
- Occupations: Motorcycle journalist, TV producer and presenter

Mike Seate (born in 1965) is a motorcycle journalist, TV producer and presenter from Pittsburgh, Pennsylvania. In addition to newspaper columns, Seate has authored books and is the founder of Café Racer magazine.

== Works ==
=== Books ===
- Mike Seate (2000). Two Wheels on Two Reels: A History of Biker Movies. Whitehorse Press.
- Mike Seate (2002). Streetbike Extreme. MotorBooks International.
- Mike Seate (2003). Jesse James: The Man and His Machines. MotorBooks International.
- Mike Seate (13 March 2003). Choppers. MotorBooks International.
- Mike Seate (27 Nov 2003). Suzuki GSX-R. MotorBooks International.
- Mike Seate (2004). Outlaw Choppers. MotorBooks International.
- Mike Seate (2004). How to Build a West Coast Chopper Kit Bike. MotorBooks International.
- Mike Seate (2006). Technochop. MotorBooks International.
- Mike Seate (2007). How to build a pro streetbike. St. Paul: MotorBooks International.
- Mike Seate (2008). Choppers Forever: A Complete History. Motorcycle Riders Club of America.
- Mike Seate; Dave Degens (2008). Cafe Racer, the Motorcycle: Featherbeds, Clip-Ons, Rear-Sets and the Making of a Ton-Up Boy. Parker House Publishing.
- Mike Seate (2009). How to Build a Cafe Racer: Cafe Racers in the Twenty-first Century. Parker House Publishing.

=== Documentaries ===
- Glory Road: The Legacy of the African-American Motorcyclist (2005)
- American Biker (2005)
- Quite Frankly, with Stephen A. Smith (2005)
- Café Society, Café Racer Documentary (2010)

=== TV Series ===
Café Racer (2008 to date) Velocity (Discovery HD Theater)
