= 59 Club =

British motorcycle club

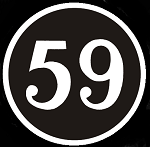
- Abbreviation: The 9
- Founded: 1959
- Founder: John Oates
- Founded at: London, England
- Type: Charity
- Purpose: To help young motorcyclists
- Region served: Worldwide
- Members: 30,000 (600 annual renewals)
- Key people: Reverend Bill Shergold; Reverend Graham Hullett
- Website: www.the59club.co.uk

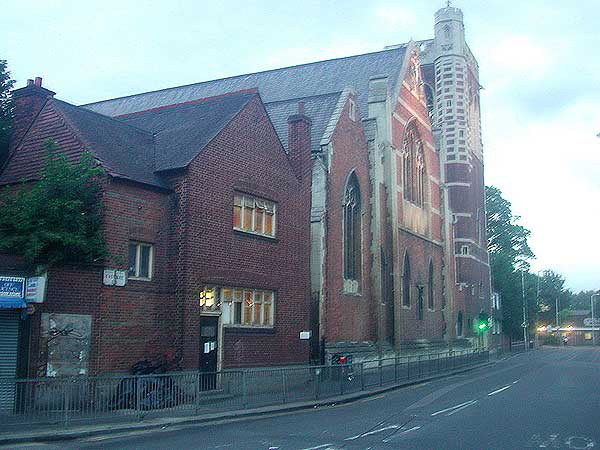
Eton Mission, original home of the 59 Club at St. Mary of Eton Church, Eastway, Hackney Wick, London

The 59 Club, also written as The Fifty Nine Club and known as 'the 9', is a British youth and motorcycle club with members found internationally.

The 59 Club started as a Church of England-based youth club founded at St Mary of Eton church in Hackney Wick by Reverend John Oates, in the East End of London, then an underprivileged area suffering post-war deprivations. Unlike most church youth clubs at the time, the 59 Club allowed entry to all young people from the local community, whether they attended church or not. The motorcycle section was established in 1962 and became known in the mid-1960s for its adoption of the British motorcycling subculture known as 'rockers', who were at that time a central part of the mods and rockers clashes. Its badge has taken on an iconic value for them. The club enjoyed fame into the early 1980s as the top hang-out spot for London Rockers and other motorcyclists, seen as creating a positive archetype for its young members to follow.

== History ==
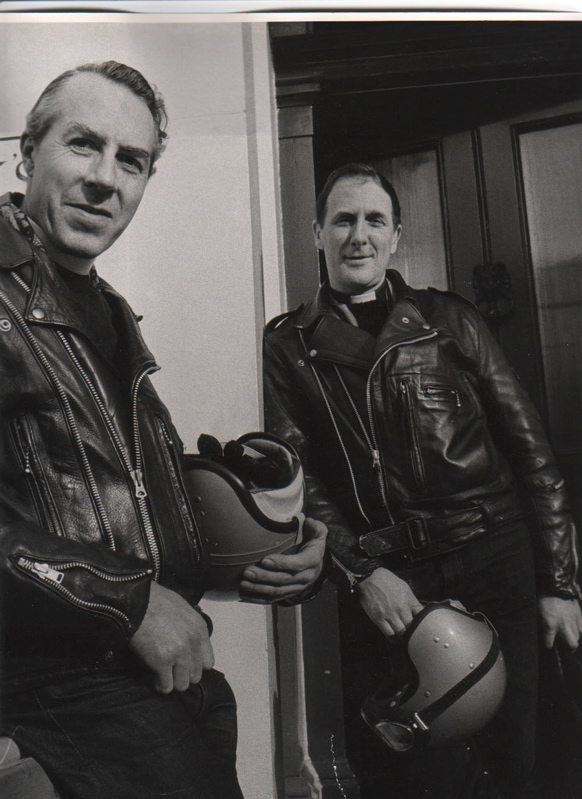
The Reverends Bill Shergold (left) and Graham Hullet, 1960s leaders of the 59 Club

The youth club was started by Church of England curate John Oates (who would later become the Canon of St Brides in Fleet Street) to provide a place where young people could meet to enjoy music and fellowship. It broke with the tradition of most church youth clubs at the time by allowing entry to all young people from the local community whether they attended church or not.

Oates secured teen star Cliff Richard to play at its opening night on Thursday, 2 April 1959, and the huge turnout ensured that the club became an instant success. Richard returned to the club often over subsequent years, and it attracted Princess Margaret, her husband Lord Snowdon, actor Dame Elizabeth Taylor and later many motorcycling sportsmen and musicians. Club trustees included Bishop Trevor Huddleston, the famous anti-apartheid campaigner.

Inspired by a visit to the Ace Cafe, Reverend William Shergold started the motorcycle section in 1962. The motorcyclists met once a week on Saturday evenings at the Eton Mission, where there was ample parking and a large hall with table tennis, billiards, a juke box and a coffee bar. Motor Cycle staff writer Mike Evans in 1963 reported: "Ably managed by the Rev. Bill Shergold, the club is affectionately known by London riders as 'The Vic's Caff'!"

In May 1964, Rev. Shergold moved to a new parish, St. Mary on Paddington Green Church St Mary's. The club followed by moving from Hackney Wick to a church property at Paddington Green in Paddington in the West End of London.

In March 1965, AP news agency quoted the membership as "nearly 7,000, from almost every corner of Britain". The club celebrated its third anniversary at a function held at their two-story church hall on 23 October. The centerpiece was a large iced cake created by Arthur Keen and decorated by 'Jiminy' as a facsimile of Brands Hatch motor racing circuit and weighing 84 lb (38 kg). The hall was packed with 1,200 members and friends attended, with some sleeping overnight and nearly 1,000 motorcycles parked outside. At that time, Motor Cycle magazine quoted the membership at 10,000, further confirming the previous year's membership with the comment: "That's well over 250 new members a month, if you care to work it out!". The celebrations were concluded the next day when Rev. Shergold held a Sunday service at his nearby church.

The January 1966 issue of Motorcycle Mechanics magazine carried a letter submitted previously by a Charles Howe, on behalf of the 59 Club, successfully applying for a free motorcycle, a vintage 1939 Royal Enfield v-twin donated by Assistant Editor Ian Speller. In the letter, membership was quoted at 9,500.

The venue for the club's fourth anniversary was Alexandra Palace, allowing for 3,000 attendees on 10 December. Membership in September 1966 was quoted at 13,000; the club hosted a stand at the Earls Court motorcycle show to recruit further new members.

The club made headlines again in 1968, when it became one of the first places in the UK to preview the previously banned biker movie The Wild One in 1968.

In 1969, the club was quoted as having 20,000 members during a "Write-In" campaign that began 5 October Members sent letters by mail and encouraged recipients to contribute 1 pound (£) each to raise capital needed to renovate their new premises.

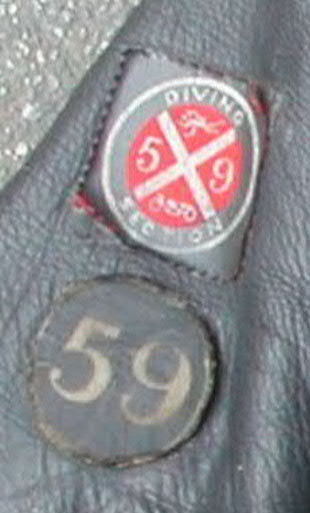
Diving Section badge attached to a Lewis Leathers Super Bronx jacket sleeve

The 59 Club attracted both male and female members. According to Father Graham Hullet, its success was based on its almost entire lack of rules. Besides motorcycles and 1950s rock and roll, the club involved activities such as football and sub-aqua diving—which gave the youths, mainly from underprivileged backgrounds, an outlet for their energy. Each year, the club organised ride-outs to famous winter motorcycle rallies such as the Dragon Rally in Wales, the Elephant Rally at the Nürburgring in Germany, and to the Isle of Man TT races. The 59 Club Barbeque still occurs every year at TT in Laxey, on the Isle of Man coast.

Towards the end of its heyday in the 1960s, the club witnessed the birth of a very different type of motorcycle club: the American-style outlaw motorcycle clubs. The rise of these groups, which tended to cater to an older and tougher crowd, was a contrast to the 59 way of life and marked the end of the 1960s British Rocker subculture. Soon after, Japanese motorcycles began to outnumber the old British bikes. The Rocker subculture would not see a resurgence for almost a decade, but the 59 Club was carried on by original members. By the late 1980s, a Rockers revival was underway and a number of enthusiasts started a 'Classic Section' within the club. This subgroup was dedicated to upholding the 1960s Rockers subculture (the style, music, and motorcycles).

=== Past leaders ===
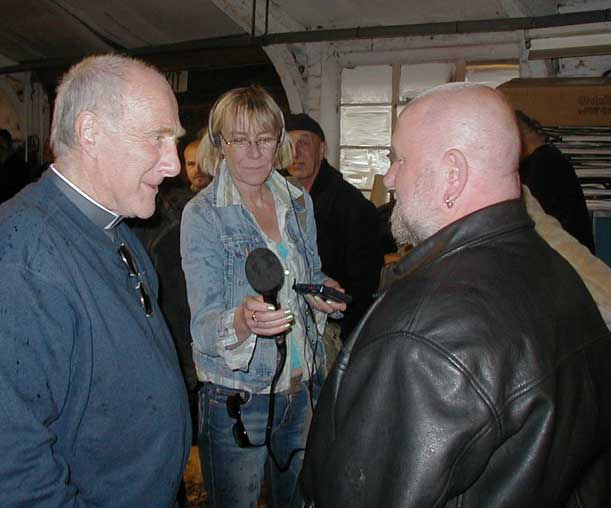
Reverend Graham Hullet, a leader of the 59 Club, with an original 59 Club member being interviewed by Dilly Barlow of BBC Radio 4 Home Truths

Bill Shergold was remembered as "a father figure that many of the boys never had" was the president until he died aged 89 in Wells, Somerset in May 2009.

Another vicar and keen motorcyclist, Rev. Graham Hullett, was Club Leader from 1966 to 1970, and promoted a culture of helping people from troubled backgrounds. He was later interviewed for BBC Radio 4 Home Truths, to speak about the club's heyday. Hullet died in a Lincoln hospital in 2012, aged 80.

== Present day ==
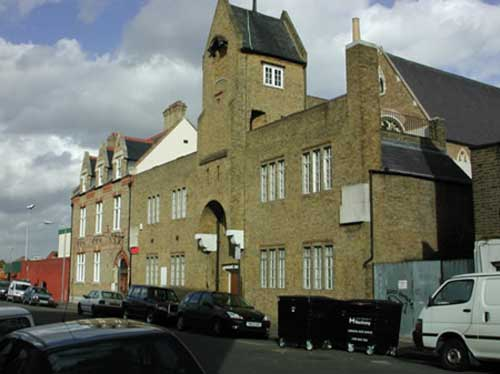
St Augustine's Church in Yorkton Street, Hackney, 59 Club clubhouse until 1993

In 1993 the 59 Club moved from Yorkton Street in Hackney to Plaistow. Up until that time all the club heads were paid either by the church or the GLC but since then have managed the club on a voluntary basis.

In September 2009, the club celebrated its 50th anniversary service at St Martin-in-the-Fields church, Trafalgar Square, London.

Father Scott Anderson the club Chairman at the time lead the blessing at St Martin in the Fields Trafalgar Square.

In June 2018, the 59 Club appointed a new vicar, Father Sergiy Diduk, who opened a West London branch on the last Thursday of the month at All Saints Church in Hanworth, the first church set up by 59 Club founder Father Bill Shergold. Father Sergiy Diduk stepped down as Chair of the club in 2023.

2019 - The 60th anniversary of the club. The Bishop of London approached the club to offer the use of St. Paul's Cathedral to celebrate its diamond jubilee, with runs converging across London on the cathedral for a mass blessing and a remembrance.

2022 the 59 club had a blessing of the bikes at Westminster Abbey organised by Rev Sergiy which was televised on C5

The club has been run for the past 30 years by the Voluntary Club Leaders many of which have been members from the 60s. They form the Council of Management and Directors of the club. The constitution put forward by Father Bill calls for a Church of England Priest to be on this council hence the clubs links with the church.
