= Motorcycle riding gear =

Type of protective clothing

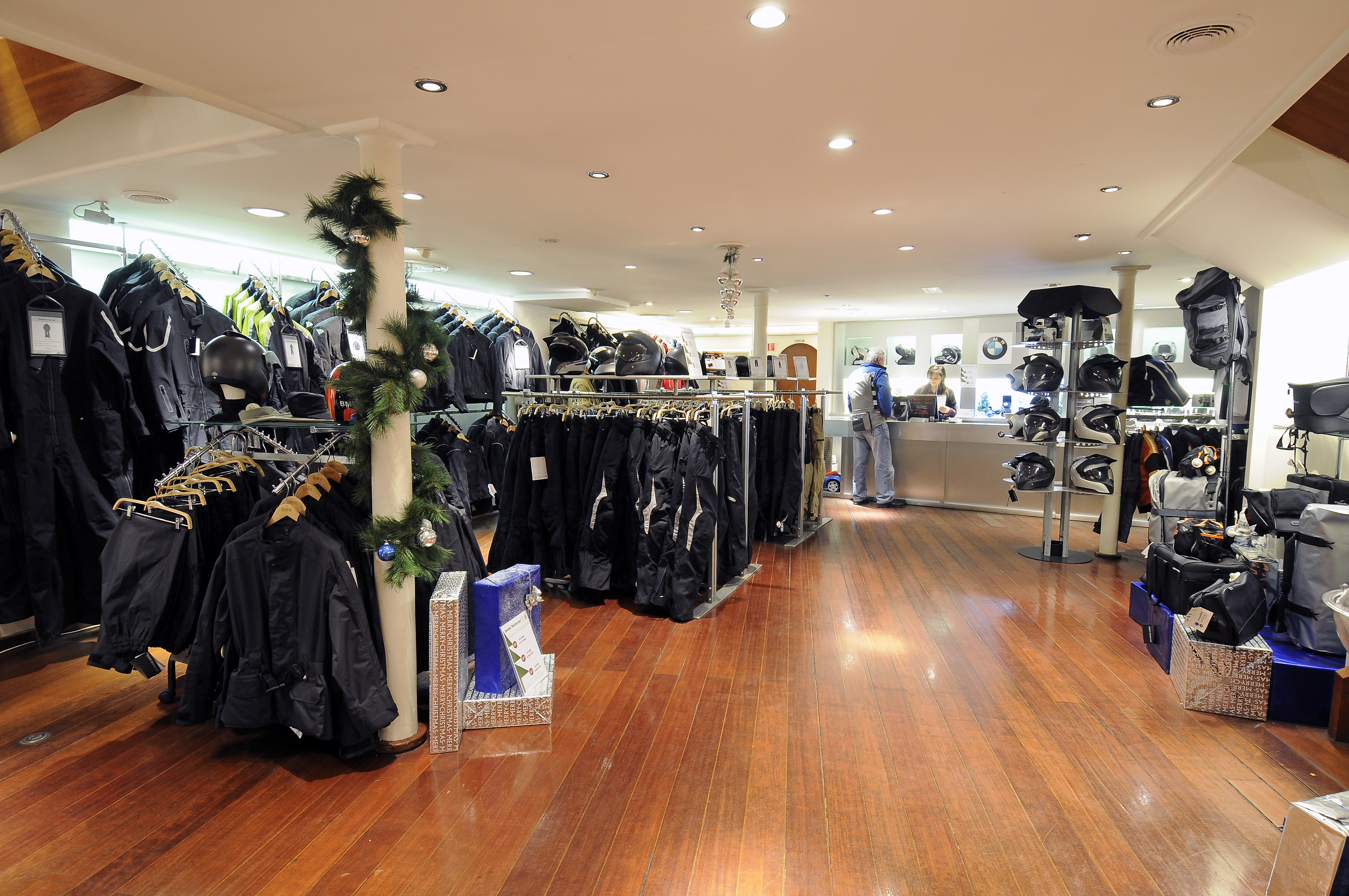
A motorcycle riding gear store

Motorcycle riding gear, or kit (UK English), is specialized clothing and equipment worn by motorcyclists. It usually serves multiple purpose at once, including crash injury protection, deflecting sun, precipitation or debris, keeping the rider warm, cool or hydrated, increasing visibility, expressing the rider's style or social identity, stowing cargo, and as a platform for wearable or embedded devices like wireless intercoms, GPS navigation devices, cell phones, or helmet-mounted displays.

== Crash protection ==
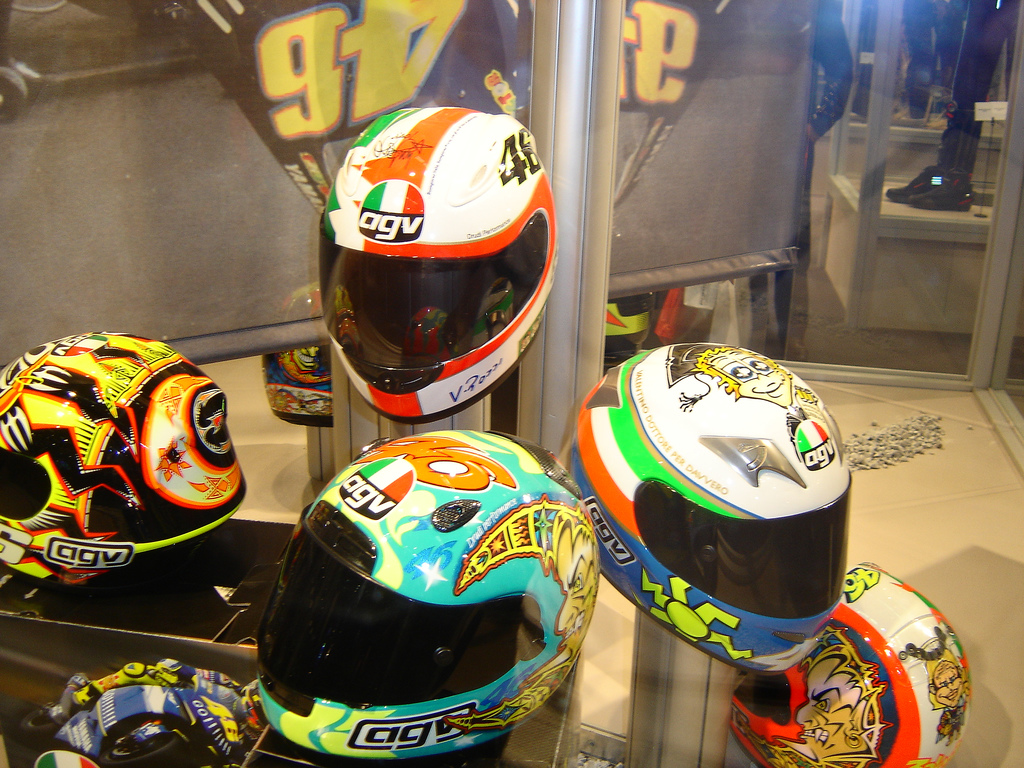
A collection of motorcycle helmets worn by Moto GP racer Valentino Rossi

For crash protection, helmets are often the first piece of gear a rider chooses, and in many jurisdictions, the only one required by law. Beyond that, crash protection comes in the form of motorcycle boots, jackets, leathers, gloves and - most recently - Air bag. Research by de Rome et al found that abrasion resistance, impact protection and seam burst strength are required for garments to offer effective protection.

== Weather ==
Most protective garments double as protection from the wind blast while riding, and from every kind of weather, keeping the rider warm, cool, and dry, either with passive insulation and ventilation, or active heating or cooling devices. Some motorcycle armor is minimalist in design, serving only to protect from crash impacts and abrasion, and so is intended to be combined with other clothing. If a motorcycle helmet does not feature a clear face shield, goggles or Riding Glasses are used to protect the rider's eyes from road debris and insects, as well as protection from wind and rain.

== Appearance ==
Motorcycling gear is also designed with appearance in mind, often to make drivers more likely to see the rider, increasing conspicuity, by combining elements of high-visibility clothing with the weather and crash protection functions of rider clothing, helmets and other items. Selling these items to riders, comprising at least $1.15 billion (clothing) plus $1.2 billion (accessories including helmets and other equipment) of the $21.5 billion (2004) US motorcycle industry, depends on both practical and aesthetic appeal. Fashion and style drive these sales as much as utility, and an entirely separate category of motorcycle-inspired fashion exists in addition to the motorcycle-specific clothing industry, of motorcycle-inspired jackets and other items sold in general retail outlets, intended for non-riders. Helmets, jackets and other clothing may also display designs, text and images to identify the rider or his group, such as club insignia, police, fire and other utility riders, or as adverting space for the logos of motorcycle sport sponsors.

== Other purposes ==
Rider clothing may also be made with storage in mind, providing a variety of pockets including those for holding and displaying maps, smartphones, GPS navigation devices, and other wearables, or accommodating Bluetooths or CB radio two-way communication devices, often built into helmets with wiring routed through specialized clothing. Helmet-mounted displays may be included as well, along with visors that protect the face from wind or debris, and filter sunlight with permanent, movable, or variable visors.
