= Motorcycle personal protective equipment =

Protective clothing and helmets for motorcycle safety

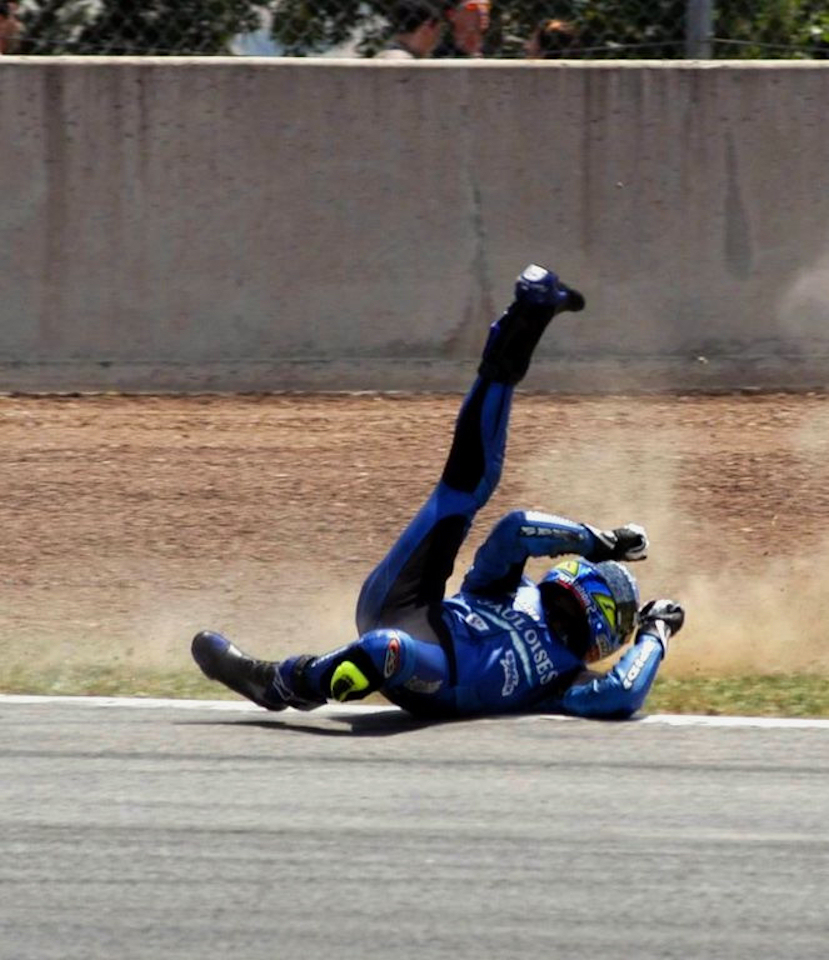
A motorcyclist wearing helmet, gloves, boots and leathers slides along a racetrack after crashing

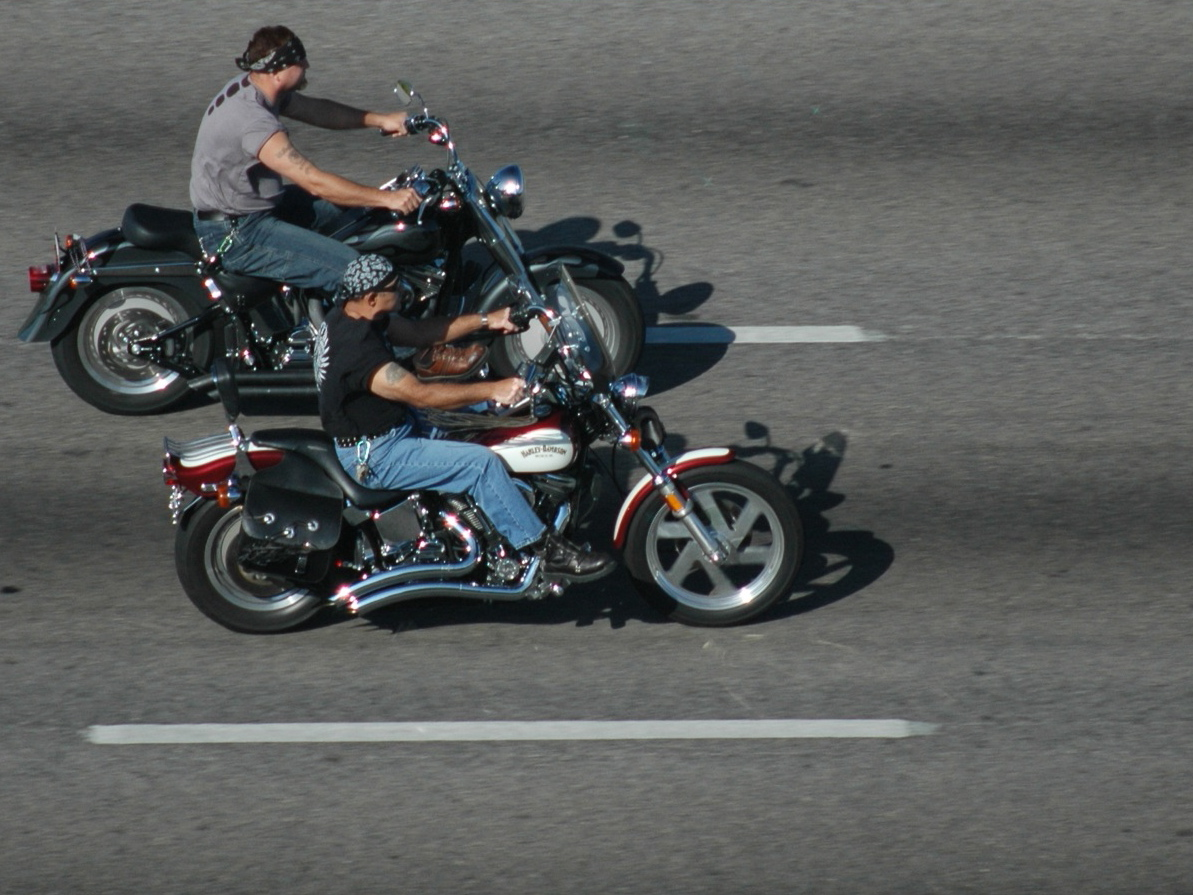
Some riders neglect safety with other priorities in choosing what equipment to wear.

To improve motorcycle safety, many countries mandate the wearing of personal protective equipment such as protective clothing and helmets. Protective clothing may include certain types of jackets, gloves, boots, and pants. Jackets meant for motorcyclists are typically made of leather or specialized man-made fabrics like cordura or Kevlar. These jackets typically include padding on the elbow, spine, and shoulder regions. This was once quite bulky, but modern technology and materials have made it unobtrusive. Gloves are generally made of leather or Kevlar and some include carbon fiber knuckle protection. Boots, especially those for sport riding, include reinforcement and plastic caps on the ankle and toe areas. Pants are usually leather, cordura, or Kevlar. Except for helmets, none of these items are required by law in any state in the USA, or in any part of the UK but are recommended by many of those who ride.

"Off road" riders wear a range of plastic armour to protect against injury from falling off, hitting other riders and bikes, debris kicked up from the rear wheel of leading bikes, and from running into track barriers protecting the public. This armour protects the extremities from breakage and dislocation and the back and chest from strain and broken bones. Although fairly efficient, it is of course not always completely effective. Many riders wear "roost protectors" designed specifically to protect against painful debris from other bikes, but are of no use in a fall or collision.

== Clothing ==
=== Historical development ===
The initial styles of protective leather motorcycle clothing was adapted from existing styles of cold-weather clothing, with thigh-length coats (usually double-breasted for warmth) common among cold-climate riders from the 1890s. As racing motorcycles became specialized around 1905/6, sensible riders adapted close-fitting leather jackets and jerkins for protection. These too were double-breasted and buttoned up, usually with short collars (to obviate flapping), tight sleeves, but were cropped to waist length, and often paired with leather jodhpurs. This design of racing outfit was common until WW2, with companies like Dunhill and Lewis Leathers offering the style basically unchanged even into the 1940s.

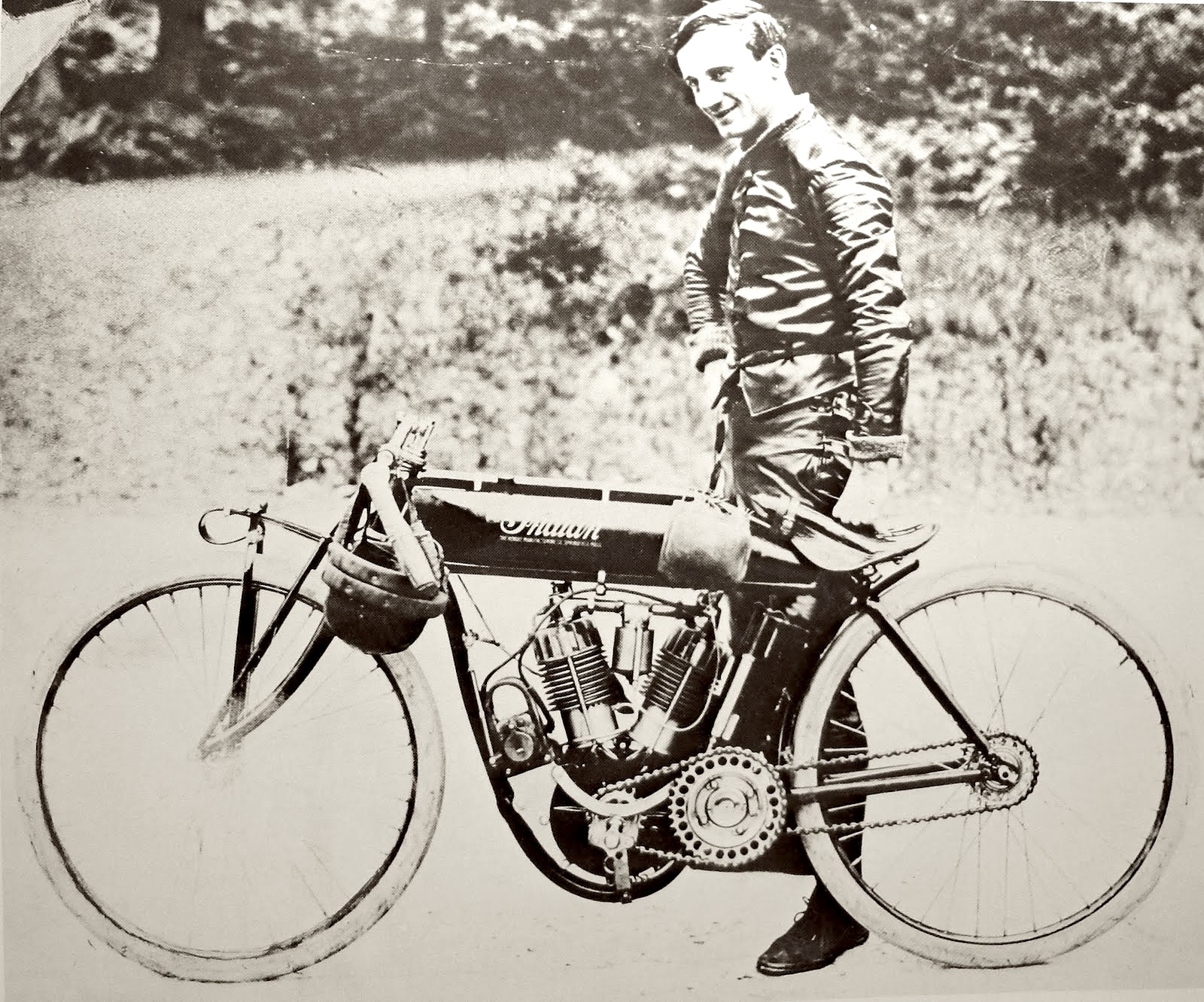
Canadian-American motorcycle racer Jake De Rosier at the Isle of Man TT in 1911

The classic American 'biker' jacket was likely invented in 1925 by Henry Shaw of Leathertogs, a pioneering motorcycle clothing brand from Everett Massachusetts that disappeared shortly after WW2. Shortly afterwards, the classic Schott Perfecto motorcycle jacket with epaulets and diagonal zipper was produced from 1928 by Irving Schott, of Schott NYC in New York City. The Perfecto was made famous by Marlon Brando in The Wild One, (1954). Leather chaps, adapted from cowboy gear, were used by American bikers starting in the early 1960s.

The one-piece racing leather suit, usually referred to as 'racing leathers', evolved from the one-piece boilersuit and later Sidcot suit used by pilots from 1916 onwards. The first form-fitting one-piece leather racing suit was apparently first commissioned by Velocette Managing Director Bertie Goodman circa 1948, and quickly adapted by world champion motorcycle racer Geoff Duke by 1950. Duke had the suit made for the purposes of streamlining, not safety, and like the majority of the leathers used at the time, was made from horsehide. The first woman to wear one-piece racing leathers was Anke-Eve Goldmann, who commissioned a form-fitting suit with diagonal zipper for racing from German manufacturer Harro by 1955.

In 1994, the first leathers to achieve the European Standard for motorcycle clothing (EN 13595) were made by BKS (Made-to-Measure) Ltd and then Hideout Leather Ltd. These two companies went on to become the main suppliers of motorcycle clothing to the British police and emergency services (as well as supplying professional racers and ordinary civilians).

In the European Union and UK, motorcycle garments must have armour on the inside at major impact regions such as shoulders, elbows, hips (with the exception of Class A or B) and knees. Optional protection may be present at the back, chest and lumbar. The European Standards for these protectors are EN 1621-1:2012, EN 1621-2:2014 and EN 1621-3:2018. Motorcycle armor was originally made from high density foam or foam backed hard polymers for impact absorption, and designed to prevent or reduce injury by spreading and dampening impact and shear strains to the wearer. However, viscoelastic materials are increasingly being used because they combine being soft to wear with significant impact absorption. In Europe, by law, armor has to have a CE mark. CE-marked armor comes in two levels. Also, some motorcycle jackets use an airbag system. It deploys in the event of an accident, inflating to protect the rider's neck, torso, and lower back (see also Airbag and Air bag vest). Airbag protection has been used in MotoGP since 2007, and has been compulsory since 2018.

In September 2021, Motorcycle News reported that variable-rigidity clothing could be the future of motorcycle clothing. Wang et al. (2021) described fabrics with tunable mechanical properties: "Their design can target desirable characteristics, such as high impact resistance."

=== Leathers ===
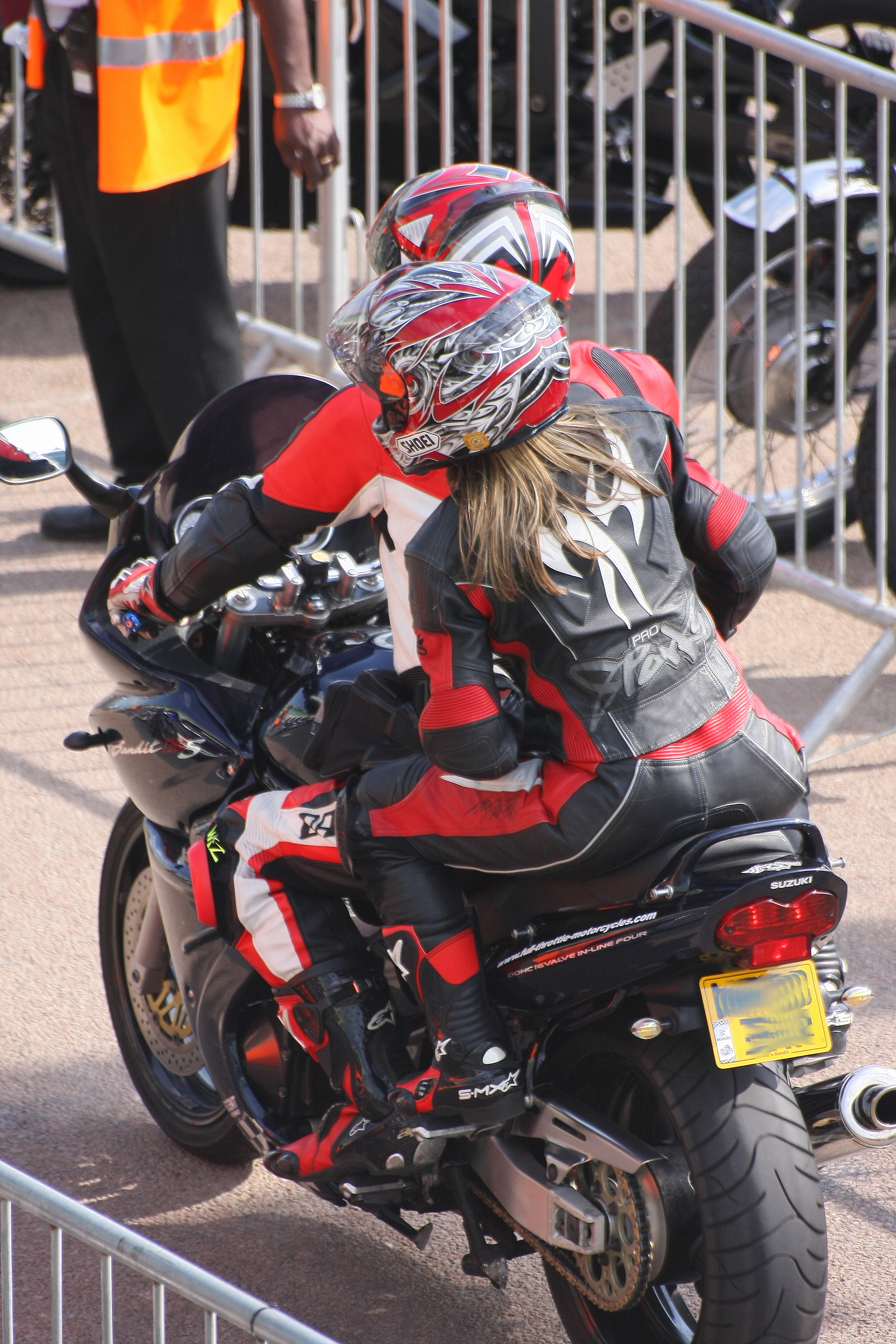
A rider and passenger wearing leathers

Leathers are one-piece suits or two-piece jackets and trousers worn by motorcyclists, mainly for protection in a crash. In most cases, the type of leather used is not fashion leather but protective leather, which is thicker, stronger, and only moderately flexible. Today, kangaroo leather is becoming popular for its suppleness, light weight, and strength compared to cowhide. Not all leathers used in garments perform equally; products made from full grain, top grain, corrected grain, and suede can have different levels of resistance to abrasion, as well as tearing and bursting forces.

Leather suits were the first motorcyclists' garments to be tested using the Cambridge impact abrasion tester, Some leather products available have been certified as meeting the European Standard EN 13595-1:2002.

=== Textiles ===
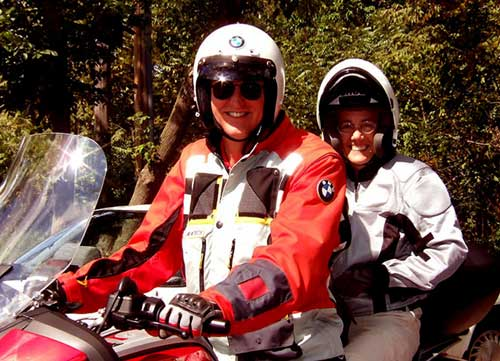
Armoured textile jackets: Cordura left and fully ventilated right

An alternative to leather is clothing constructed of engineered textiles. These can offer improved weather protection from heat, cold, and water, and the increased utility these garments tend to provide in terms of pockets and vents. Common materials include high density (600–1000 Denier) ballistic nylon (e.g., Cordura) and Kevlar, or blends of Kevlar, Cordura, and Lycra; and often include waterproof liners made from materials such as Gore-Tex. In both CE marked (meets European Standards) and non-protective garments, localised protection may be provided by armour and airbag systems.

Not all textile clothing is made from synthetic materials. Denim and heavyweight waxed cotton was used for many years before the development of modern materials.

== Boots ==
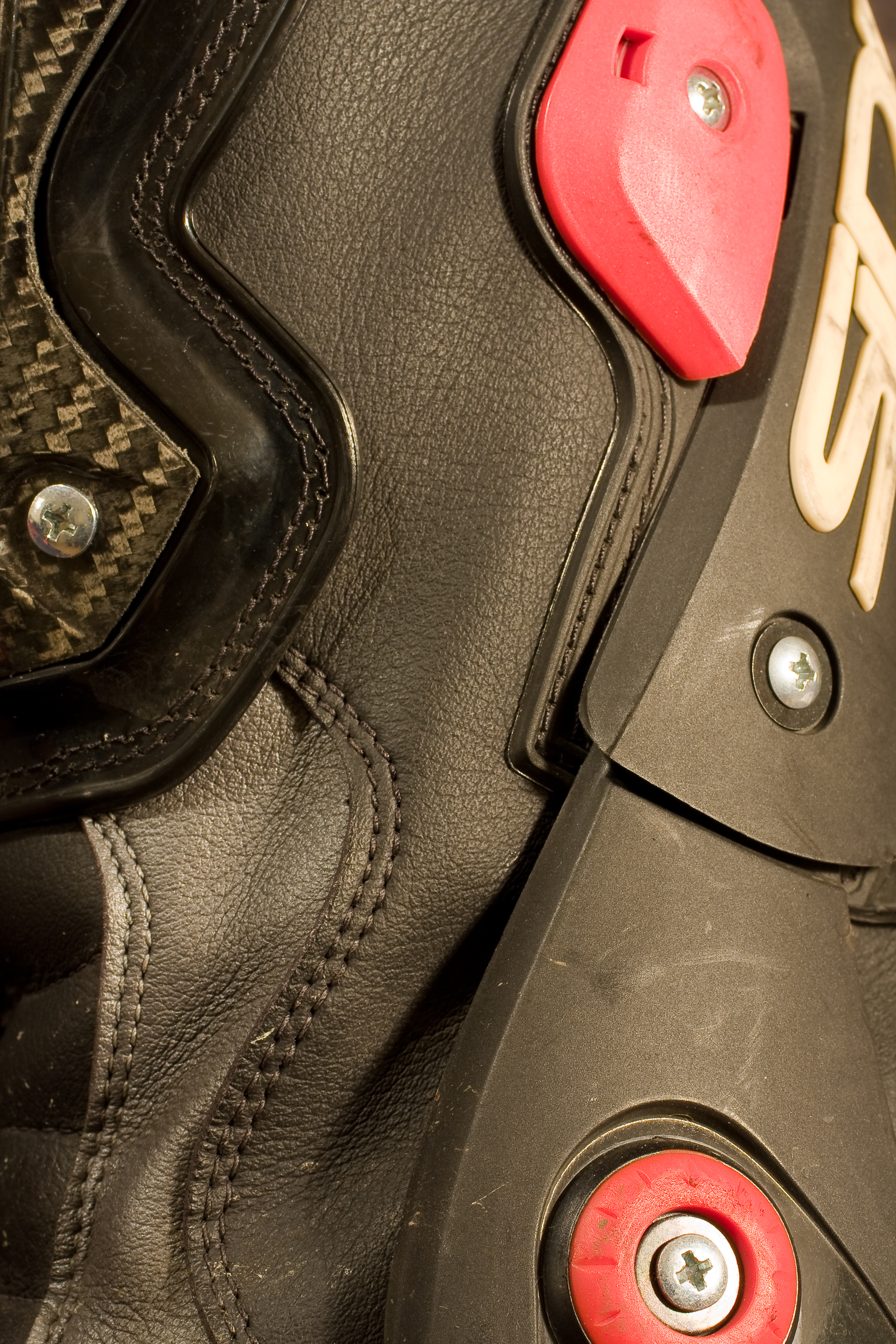
Detail of racing boot's shin with shin armour and anti torque system

Boots are worn by motorcycle riders and passengers to prevent or reduce harm to their feet and ankles while riding and in the event of a crash. They are designed using materials and seam construction that are impact, abrasion, cut, tear and burst resistant. Tough, strong, moderately flexible boots with stiff soles provide the rider protection from a number of risks. Boots with oil-resistant, rubber-based composite soles give a grip on the pavement and help keep the rider's feet on the pegs. Boots may also have energy absorbers and load spreaders on the shin, inside and outside of each ankle. A stiff sole working laterally helps prevent or decrease crash injuries caused by crushing and shear strain.

There is a European standard available for motorcycle boots, and it is a legal requirement in Europe and the UK for these boots to be CE certified. It tests them for resistance to abrasion, penetration by sharp objects and lateral crushing. The label consists of a motorcycle icon, the designation of the test they've passed and then a series of four numbers. The more '2's on the CE label, the more protective the boot. (1 denotes rudimentary protection, while 2 indicates better protection – in tests of resistance against abrasion, cuts and being crushed.)

== Armour ==
Armour increases the chances of a motorcyclist surviving an accident. The most common form of armour was high-density foam but viscoelastic material has become more common. It is fitted into the shoulders, elbows, back, hips and knees of motorcycle PPE clothing. Research by Afquir et al. (2019) suggested that coccyx protection was crucial but often omitted. Separate protectors are also available, typically for the chest and back, which are worn under other items of clothing.

The most widely cited standard for armor is its CE rating: level 1 (lower protection) or level 2 (better impact absorption). The criteria for levels 1 and 2 vary by intended use – back protection, air bag vest or body armor each have different requirements. The CE standards also classify the surface area that armor protects. For example, body armour is classed as type A (limited coverage) or type B (better coverage). And back protectors are classed as either Centre Back (CB) – which offers no protection to the shoulder blades – or Full Back (FB) coverage.

Research has found limitations with these standards. De Rome et al. (2011) found that motorcycle armour was not associated with less risk of fractures. Work by Albanese et al (2017) could explain why: "The allowable transmitted force of EN 1621-1 may be too high to effectively reduce the probability of impact injury.".

Dr Roderick Woods at Cambridge University led the work on which the CE standard is based. Initially, there were three levels of armour: Level 1 would be tested with an impact of 40 Joules, Level 2 at 50 Joules, and Level 3 at 60 Joules. The mean transmitted force of all impacts would be below 25 kN, and no single impact should exceed 37.5 kN. Two Italian manufacturers – allegedly concerned their armour would not pass the highest standard – successfully lobbied for Level 3 to be removed. It contributed evidence to the assertion that the EU standards for motorcycle PPE have been subject to regulatory capture by manufacturers (a claim reiterated with the advent of EN 17092).

== Helmet ==
A motorcycle helmet is protective headgear used by motorcycle riders. The primary goal of a motorcycle helmet is to protect the rider's head during impact, although many helmets provide additional protection such as a face shield. In many countries the wearing of motorcycle helmets is mandatory.

Helmets are made in two main layers: hard and energy-absorbing. The hard shell spreads an impact over a larger area, while deformation of the liner (often polystyrene foam) absorbs energy so less is transferred to the skull and brain.

There are three main styles: flip-face, open-face and full-face. An open-face helmet, which includes half helmets and three-quarter helmets, will protect everything but the face. Full-face helmets protect the skull, plus providing protection for the lower jaw as well as the face itself. Full-face helmets offer much more protection than open-face helmets.

Several manufacturers have introduced full-face helmets with a flip-up front, combining the protection of a full-face with the ease of communication and donning or doffing that an open-face gives.

Studies have consistently shown that wearing a helmet:

- Reduces injury and increases a rider's chance of surviving a crash
- Does not contribute to neck injuries
- Does not impair vision or hearing

As with other protective gear, a brightly colored helmet improves the user's visibility.

UN Regulation No. 22 sets the requirements for approving motorcycle helmets and their visors in the countries that apply it. Its 06 series of amendments, commonly called ECE 22.06, entered into force on 3 January 2021. The revision added an oblique impact test that measures rotational acceleration, impact tests at more points on the shell and at different speeds, and a high-speed particle test for visors. Modular (flip-up) helmets must meet the standard with the chin bar both closed and open.

In the United Kingdom, the Department for Transport's Safety Helmet Assessment and Rating Programme (SHARP), launched in 2007, rates helmets from one to five stars using a wider range of tests than the minimum legal requirements. By November 2016 it had published ratings for 401 helmets.

== Gloves ==
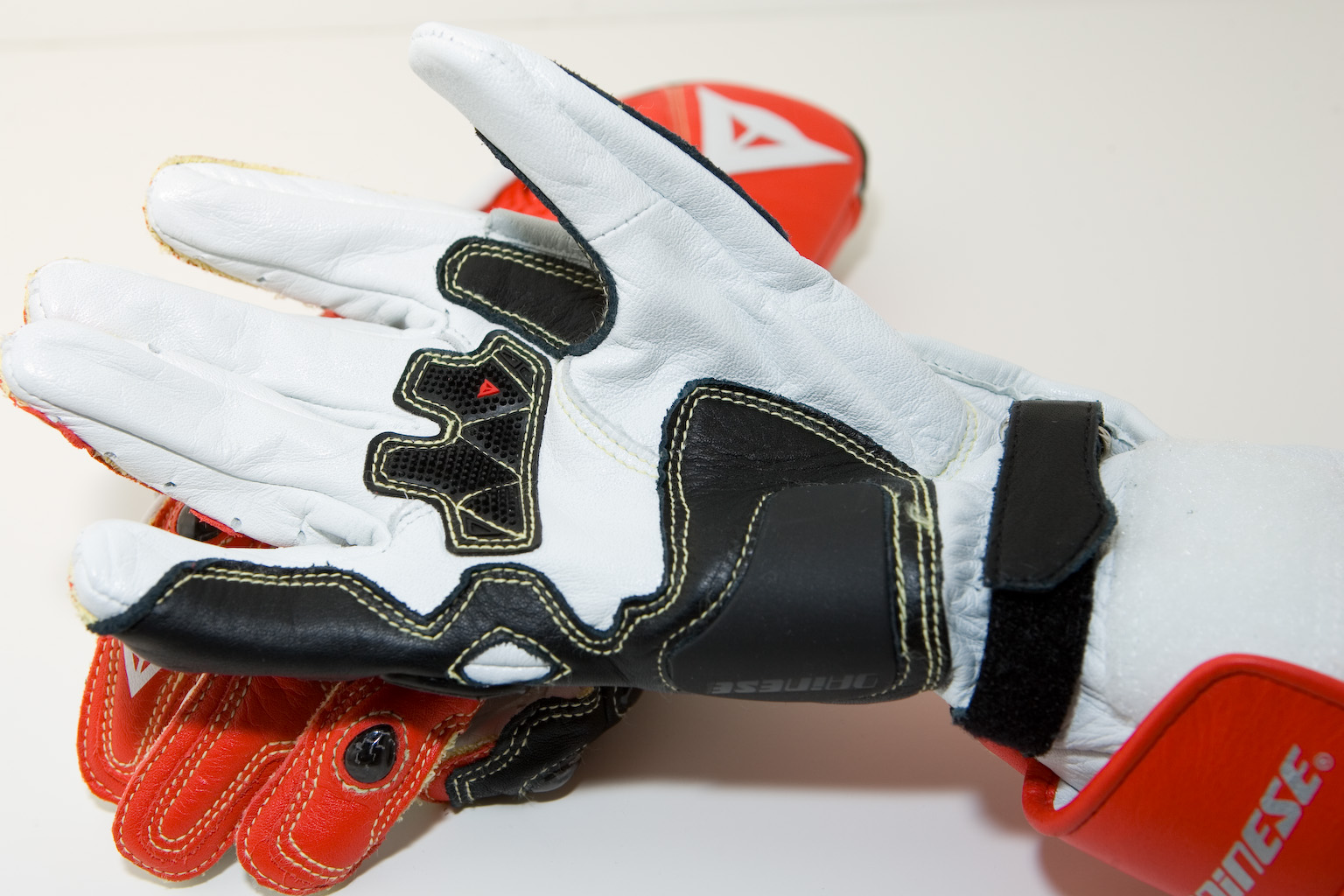
Racing glove (palm)

Motorcycling gloves are typically gloves made of leather. They may have gauntlets to protect the rider's wrists from injury, and help reduce drafts while riding in colder climates. Motorcycling gloves typically have reinforced palms intended to protect the rider from abrasion injuries in case of an accident. Under some jurisdictions, if the manufacturer claims the gloves are protective, then they must display CE marking. European Standard EN 13594:2015 is available for this purpose, with gloves certified to Level 1 or Level 2. The latter provides significantly more protection. For example, knuckle protection is not required for a CE Level 1 rating, but is required to achieve Level 2. In France, riders and passengers of motorcycles, motor tricycles, motor quadricycles and mopeds have been required to wear CE-marked motorcycle gloves since 20 November 2016. Not wearing them is a third-class offence and carries a one-point licence penalty.

Optional features include additional protection or weatherproofing. For touring gloves, such additional features may include advanced insulating materials and waterproof breathable fabric, although touring gloves may still lack advanced armouring features used in motorcycle racing gloves.

Gloves intended for motorcycle racing typically incorporate pre-curved finger sections and the best available protection, obtained through additional armour incorporated within the glove. Additional protection may involve titanium or carbon panels for knuckles and the joints of the fingers. Furthermore, racing gloves may and often do incorporate additional wrist and other protection panels to protect the heel of the hand, back of the hand and other easily injured parts of the hand. Race gloves - and more premium road gloves - often have the pinky finger attached to the ring finger to reduce the chance of it being over flexed backwards during crashes.

Frequently, scaphoid injuries can occur in road, race and motocross accidents. Knobloch et al. (2015) found: "Hyperextension rather than wrist flexion appears as the predominant mechanism of wrist injuries in motocross riders. A more axial impact on the wrist is more likely to produce a radial fracture during the landing phase. Preventive strategies are internal muscular wrist stabilisation using eccentric training and external stabilisation by rigid gloves allowing only limited hyperextension." Often, gloves designed for road and track riding feature hard plastic scaphoid protectors that claim to reduce fracture risk by encouraging the heel to slide on the road (instead of gripping the road surface, causing hyperextension). Some manufacturers claim stingray leather or SuperFabric layers offer the same protective sliding effect. However, there is a shortage of independent research into the effectiveness of SuperFabric, stingray leather and plastic scaphoid protectors.

== Goggles/glasses ==
Motorcycle goggles or glasses help protect the eyes from dust, wind and debris while riding and typically feature anti-fog treatment and protection against UV rays. For motorcycle sports such as motocross, goggles typically feature a foam rim which seals against the face and layered, tinted lenses to accommodate for varying light conditions. Motocross goggles may also have the ability to use tear-offs, which are disposable films that cover the lens and which can be easily torn off while riding, to clear the lens of accumulated mud or other fouling and restore good vision to the rider.

== Testing ==
=== Europe ===
For many years, the most recognised method for evaluating protective motorcycle clothing was the European Standard EN 13595-1:2002. This clothing standard was for professional riders. The standard offered two levels of protection: lower (level 1) or higher (level 2) protection with an emphasis on impact abrasion resistance, seam burst resistance, tear strength and cut resistance.

The standard specifies the use of the Cambridge-type impact abrasion tester. This test involves dropping the clothing material onto an abrasive belt moving at 28 km/h and measuring the time for a hole to form. Dr Roderick Woods (at Cambridge University) used accident damage to clothing from real-life crashes – combined with damage seen in manikins thrown from a moving vehicle – to ensure that the test replicated the real-world damage as close as possible. This test found a relationship between fabric thickness and time to hole for protective denim products.

In 2017, a new European Standard began development, and EN 17092 was created. The standard follows similar testing methods, with abrasion resistance, tear strength and seam strength key factors assessed.

A new class system was introduced to replace the level 1 and 2 rating system. Class AAA garments provide the highest possible requirements, while Class AA and Class A garments have lower standards. The tests vary significantly between them. For example, Class A jackets do not require any abrasion resistance on the back. And neither Class A nor AA trousers consider the buttocks a high-risk zone in their test requirements. Only Class AAA trousers protect a rider's backside by treating it as "zone 1" for abrasion resistance.

While the standards for EN 13595 were independently validated, there was no peer-reviewed independent validation for the A, AA and AAA standards in EN 17092; the test settings for the AA rating were lowered from 75kph to 70kph because materials in common use in motorcycle garments could not withstand the 75kph starting point.

Two specialist classes are also available. Class B garments provide abrasion resistance but do not require impact protection to be present. Class C garments are to be worn as part of an ensemble and have no abrasion-resistant qualities. However, Class C garments must have a least one impact protector present. This class would be used for garments such as base layers.

EN 17092 abrasion resistance is carried out on a Darmstadt impact abrasion machine rather than the previous Cambridge abrasion machine. The Darmstadt was developed at a similar time but was not adopted by European Committee for Standardization. It involves dropping the test specimen onto a concrete block and assessing whether the layer closest to the skin forms a hole of 5mm or more. The specimen is held on the outer edge of a rotating arm and is travelling at speeds of up to 707rpm when it hits the surface. As the specimen holder is no longer driven, once dropped, the sample will slide on the concrete surface until it stops due to surface friction between it and the concrete surface. Unlike the Cambridge machine, a slide time in seconds is not given. Therefore, no direct comparison is readily available.

EN 17092 was published in March 2020, with EN 13595 withdrawn in March 2023. The Cambridge abrasion and impact cut test methods remain used for EN 13594 glove and EN 13634 motorcycle boot testing. Also, Australia's Motorcycle Clothing Assessment Program (MotoCAP) uses the Cambridge impact abrasion test.

=== Australia and New Zealand ===
A consortium of government and related organisations across Australia and New Zealand established MotoCAP. Its safety ratings assess how well clothing protects a motorcyclist in a crash (based on impact protection, burst resistance and abrasion resistance). Test results are weighted to emphasise the need for greater security in high-risk areas. Additionally, MotoCAP test results give a breathability score based on the Relative Vapour Permeability Index.

== Psychology ==
Research at Brunel University investigated riders’ considerations regarding wearing protective clothing. They found: "Greater intentions, anticipated regret and perceived benefits were significantly associated with increased motorcycle jacket, trousers and boots wear, with habit presence and scooter use significantly associated with increased high-visibility wear. Lower intentions, anticipated regret and risk perceptions, being female, not holding a car licence and urban riding were significantly associated with increased non-PPE wear."
