= Engineer boot =

Leather work-boots

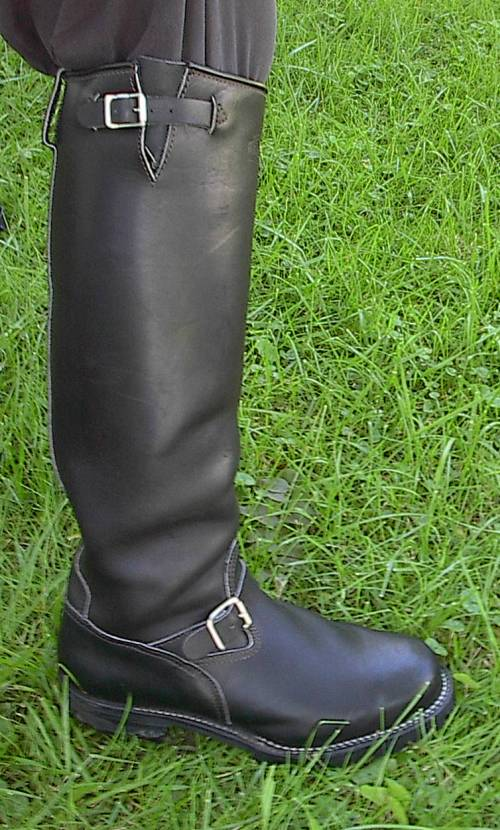
Knee-high, low-heel engineer boot

Engineer boots, also known as engineer's boots or engineering boots, are an American type of traditional leather work-boots. Their lace-less, rugged construction made them popular among motorcycle riders. Originally developed in the 1930s for firemen working on steam locomotives, the boots gained substantial popularity in the post–World War II era during a growing motorcycling culture. They became popular symbols of teenage rebellion in the 1950s and a common component of greaser wear. They were later adopted by punks in the 1970s. By the 2010s, engineer boots were being popularly worn for fashion purposes, especially by non-traditional customers such as women, young urban professionals, and hipsters.

== Description ==
Engineer boots are typically made from thick, stiff, full-grain bull hide. The leather is often oiled to add durability and flexibility, and may be brown or black in color. The double-layered shafts may be anywhere between 7 inches to 17 inches in height, and are gusseted at the top and relatively loose, though they can be tightened by a steel-buckled strap. Another steel-buckled strap is placed at the instep of each boot. As per their rugged construction, the footwear is relatively heavy.

Original engineer boots were almost always black in color. The toes were bulbous and the soles were made of thick leather. The heels were about one-and-three-quarter inches in height with a slight forward slant, with the edges being concave. Some were customized with studded straps or with cleats. Modern engineer boots vary in toe shape, heel height, sole material, or in the use of steel reinforcements.

== History ==
=== Origins ===
During the 1930s, the Chippewa Shoe Manufacturing Company developed a pair of boots with stovepipe shafts based on the style of English horse-riding boots. The West Coast Shoe Company (Wesco) began manufacturing their "engineer boots" in 1939. Engineer boots were originally meant as protective gear for firemen working on steam railway engines (i.e. "engineers"), as their minimal stitching and pull-on design made them ideal for working in conditions with hot coals, embers, and sharp edges. This is a probable source of the name. Wesco's boots were immediately popular with welders in Portland, Oregon-area shipyards, who needed looser fitting shoes that could be quickly removed if embers landed in the shafts. Engineer boots were overtaken in the shoe market during World War II by the production of lace-up combat boots and demand dramatically decreased.

=== Widespread use ===
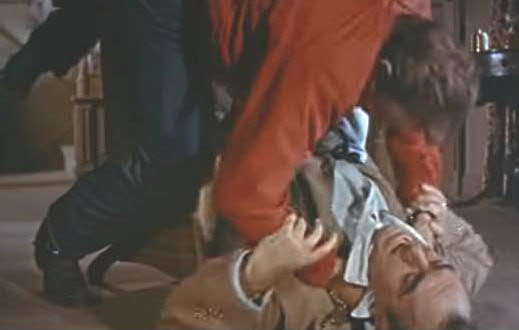
James Dean (top) in Rebel Without a Cause wearing engineer boots

Both Chippewa and Wesco heavily increased sales of engineer boots in the late 1940s. There was a post-war production boom for the boots, with high demand coming from returning veterans and bikers. The latter adopted engineer boots because the laceless design would not interfere with motorcycle drive belts, the shafts were well insulated from heat, and they provided full lower leg protection in case of an accident. The footwear's popularity was furthered by its use by celebrities such as Marlon Brando and James Dean in their respective films The Wild One (1953) and Rebel Without a Cause (1955).

The boots would become heavily associated with the American greasers and bikers who wore them in the 1950s. Overall, they contributed to the "rebellious" look of many teenagers of the era. This aesthetic was utilised in the 1961 crime drama The Young Savages, with this footwear being worn by the antagonists, three young urban gang members. From the 1950s through the 1970s engineer boots were frequently advertised in retail mail order catalogs. By the late 1960s, engineer boots were being frequently worn by hustlers and members of the gay leather subculture for fetishistic purposes. In the 1970s, they were adopted by skinheads. From there, they became a part of punk fashion, where they were used to express power and an industrial style. By the 2010s, engineer boots, along with other industrial footwear, were worn popularly for fashion purposes, especially by non-traditional customers such as women, young urban professionals, and hipsters.

== See also ==
- List of boots
- List of shoe styles
- Perfecto motorcycle jacket
