= Auxiliary fire department =

Auxiliary fire departments are found throughout the United States, mostly in larger cities with origins in the Civil Defense preparation of the Cold War.

These departments are usually overseen by local emergency management organizations (formerly civil defense). Auxiliary fire departments were intended to aid regular fire services in case of nuclear attack when it was expected large numbers of fires would result from nuclear blasts overwhelming full-time services. Most still in existence run support vehicles such as lighting trucks, air supplies, rehab units, reserve firefighting apparatus, and the like.

An Auxiliary fire department may also be used similarly like a "reserve" fire department or a "volunteer" fire department.

== See also ==
- Volunteer fire department
