= Gadesh =

Azerbaijani subculture

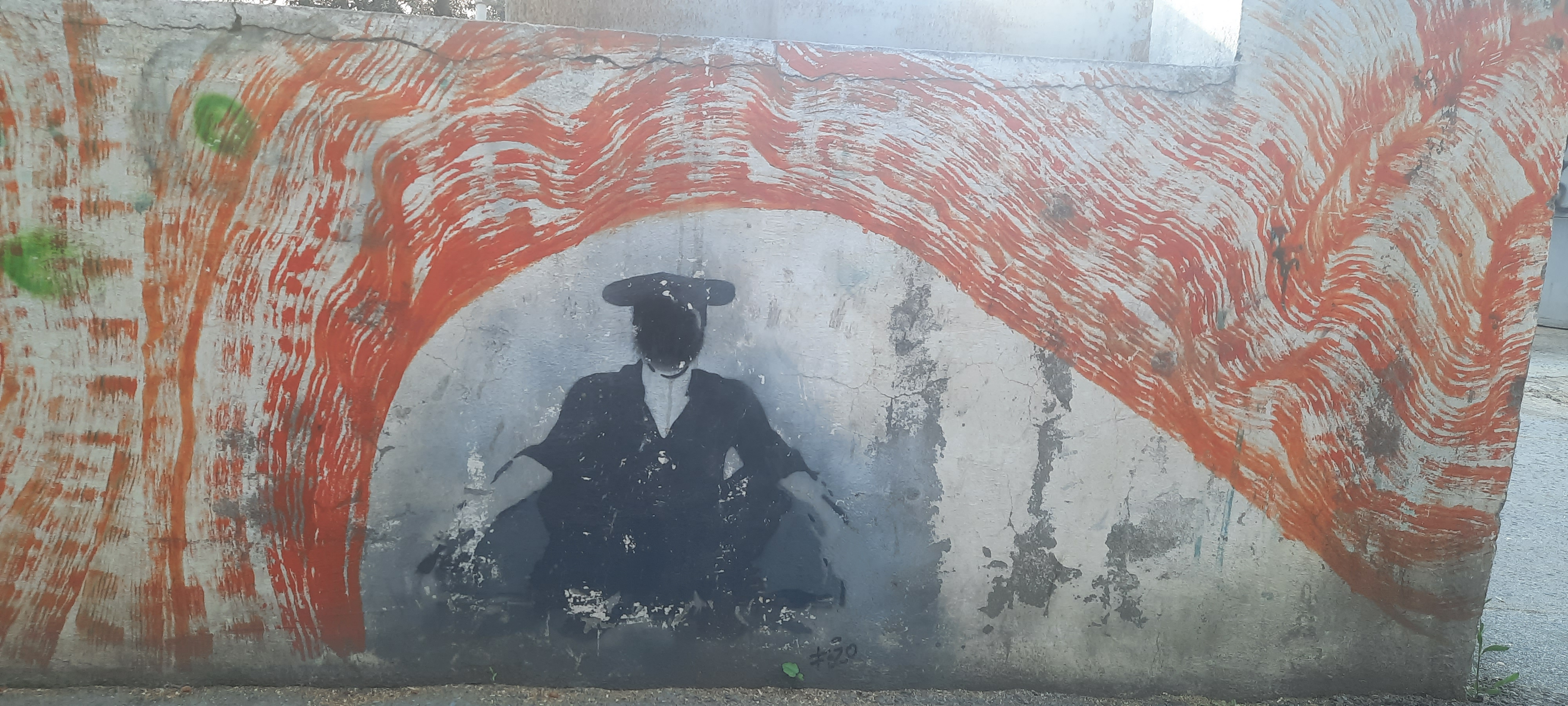
A graffiti depicts "gadesh" in Baku

Gadesh (Azerbaijani: Qədeş) or Balagadesh (Azerbaijani: balaqədeş) is a subculture in Azerbaijan. It is considered characteristic only for Baku and Baku suburbs. Since the late 2010s, this subculture is rarely found in the rural areas outside of Baku.

== Etymology ==
According to several sources, the word "gadesh" is derived from the word "brother" found in all Turkic languages and adapted to the Absheron dialect through the Tat language. It also means "little sister" in Karakalpak and Kyrgyz languages. Also, "karindash/kerentesh/kharantesh" is a Bashkir word, meaning "little sister" in the southern dialects of the language.

== History ==
The Gadesh subculture emerged in the 1950s. They are specific to Azerbaijan, mainly Baku and surrounding areas. The antagonism between the Stilyagas, who existed at the same time as the Gadesh and were the polar opposite of the Gadesh, was mostly manifested by the Gadesh putting pressure on the Stilyagas and using violence against them. Gadesh saw the Stilyagas as a group far away from national and moral ideals, acting contrary to mental values and abandoning their roots. Similarly, in Baku, the gadeshes had the same attitude towards the hippies and rockers who existed in the 1970s. Certain streets and settlements located in the center of Baku were considered particularly dangerous for local representatives of Western subcultures. In general, the meykhana was the only concept that brought together the subcultural models that existed in Azerbaijan from the World War II to the mid-1980s - the period of perestroika.

== Characteristics ==
Gadeshes are characterized by their preference for conservatism and masculinity, and their loyalty to national traditions. In the Soviet era, they were treated as members of a social group who spent their days on the streets and had a quarrelsome, hooligan lifestyle. The Gadesh were opposed to Western music and culture. At the same time, the fact that Vagif Mustafazadeh, who grew up in the areas where they spread, brought jazz music to the country worried some representatives of this subculture.

They usually spoke Baku dialect. In addition, gadeshes used their own jargon and terms that deviated from the standards of the literary language. Their names were often involved in disputes and street fights, as well as some light crimes. One of the distinguishing features of the gadeshes was their preference for listening to songs glorifying the underworld and its traditions, as well as poetic-musical genres such as chanson and meykhana. They, especially during the Soviet era, were under the influence of some unwritten laws and thought that it was wrong to contact the special services and the police during disputes. In such cases, instead of involving the police on the scene, they preferred to resolve the disputes among themselves. Gadeshes also thought it was wrong to follow the laws of the state and addressed the state officials with derogatory names. Similarities existed between the gadeshes and the rude boys, mods, and greasers.

Gadeshes preferred a more classical style of clothing, especially two colors in clothing, being white and black. They considered Western clothing to be a factor of femininity. Most gadeshes usually wore large hats known as "aerodromes" and often carried a tasbih. These two attributes were considered symbolic for them.

Gadesh subculture was considered a minority group during the Soviet era due to its distinctive features. The reason for this was that they were considered to be people who did not engage in work of any social value, and who stood against the Soviet intellectuals and nobles both in society and at the state level. Journalist Khazar Akhundov described the Gadeshes as "psychologically stuck between the urban environment and the provincial environment".

The artist Mir Teymur Mammadov, who is originally from Baku, noted that the character "gadesh" humiliates the people of Baku.

== In popular culture ==
At one time, a statue of a gadesh with a tasbih, a cap and a flip-flop (shapshapi) was placed in the Icheri Sheher, but this statue was later removed. Film director Eldar Guliyev was able to reflect the way of thinking of Baku gadeshes and their negative attitude towards innovations in the film "In a Southern City" based on the script of Rustam Ibrahimbekov. According to Said Riad, the film highlights how the remnants of the past take root in people's thoughts and how difficult it is for a person to achieve spiritual freedom. The character of Davud in "Last night of childhood" and the character of Baladadash in "Baladadash's First Love" fit the gadesh pattern. Writer Kamil Afsaroglu's work "Serenade of Soviet Street" has an important place for Gadesh subculture. In one of Gunduz Aghayev's cartoons for Azadliq Radio, a character using the expression "gadesh" is depicted.
