= Firefighter rehabilitation =

Services provided after working at the scene of an incident

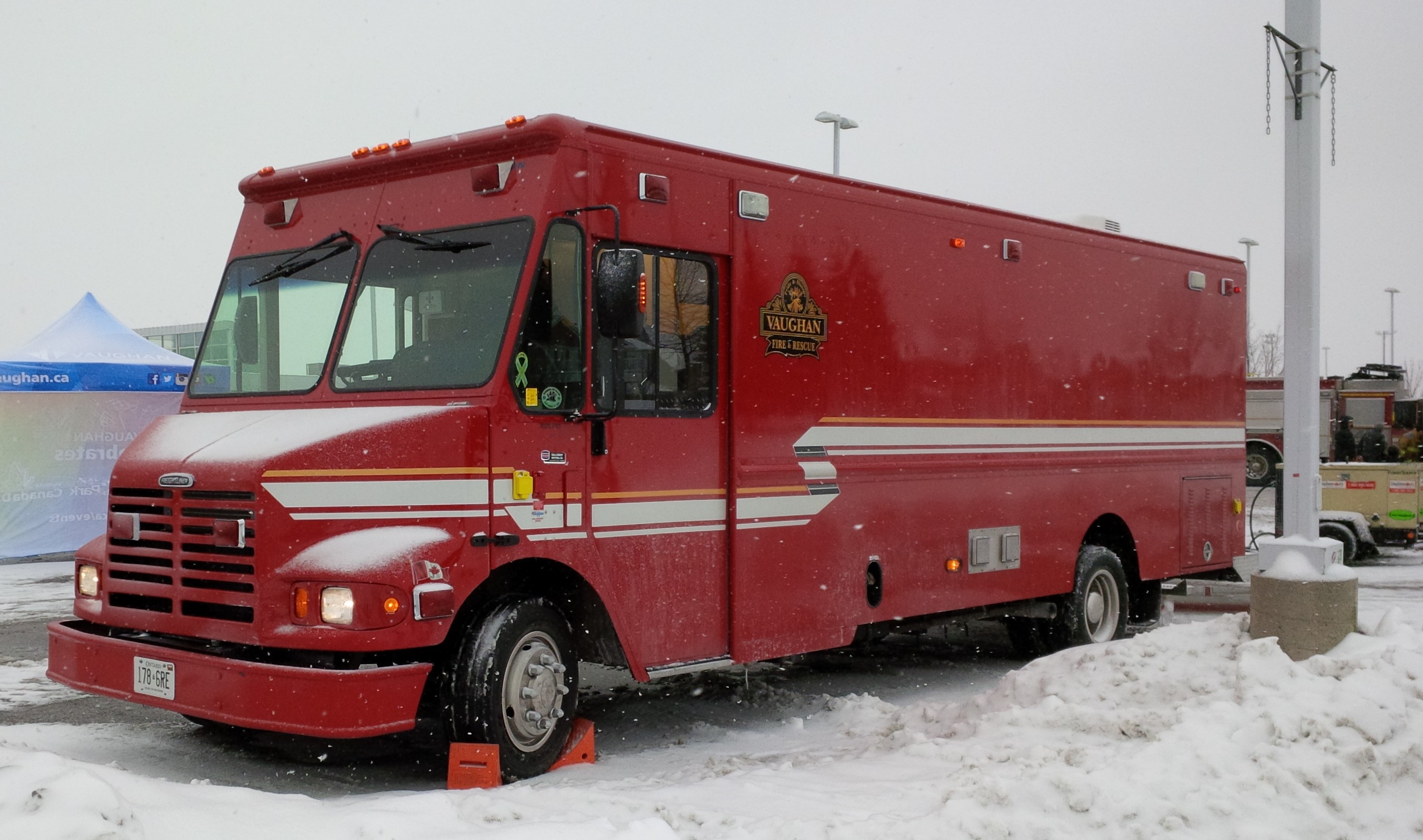
Vaughan Fire rehab unit

Firefighter rehabilitation is a vital firefighting service, providing firefighters and other emergency personnel with immediate medical attention including rehydration, treatment for smoke inhalation, and the prevention of life-threatening conditions such as heatstroke and heart attack after working at the scene of an incident. Firefighter rehabilitation can include a variety of things from a simple check up to deciding whether or not the firefighter needs to see a doctor. The rehabilitation area is set up in a safe location near the incident so that it can be accessible to any emergency responders who may need it.

== Purpose ==
Firefighter rehabilitation is designed to ensure that the physical and mental well-being of members operating at the scene of an emergency (or a training exercise) don't deteriorate to the point where it affects the safety of any other members that are performing their duties. Firefighting is inherently dangerous in the best of circumstances, and any additional physical or mental stress increases the danger. Studies have shown that core body temperature and heart rate can rise dramatically during firefighting operations. Without intervention, firefighters may be at risk for serious acute illness from the extreme conditions and high levels of exertion.

The primary mission for personnel responsible for firefighter rehabilitation is to assess, monitor and evaluate the physical and mental status of fire-rescue personnel who have been actively engaged in the emergency incident or a training exercise. Based on a comprehensive evaluation, they determine whether additional treatment, such as hydration, rest, medical care, psychological support is needed. Factors that influence the need for firefighter rehabilitation include (but not limited to), external conditions such as the temperature, intensity and duration of tasks being completed, and the use of Self-Contained Breathing Apparatus (SCBA).

In addition to the mental and physical health assessments conducted during firefighter rehabilitation, this process enables each crew to perform a Personnel Accountability Report (PAR) internally. This report ensures that all members are accounted for, are aware of the next steps, and it allows for incident command or other command staff to provide operational updates, while also maintaining compliance with safety standards.

== Designating a rehabilitation area ==
A specially designated rehabilitation area is established at the discretion of the Incident Commander through standard operating procedures. If the Incident Commander determines that rehab is necessary, firefighters may be instructed to "self-rehab" in the case of smaller-scale incidents, or qualified paramedics or emergency medical technicians should be designated to manage the rehabilitation area under the command of a fire or emergency medical service officer or supervisor. The site should be located away from any environmental hazards, or by-products of the fire, such as smoke, gases or fumes. During hot months, the ideal location might include a shady, cool area distant from the incident. In winter, a warm, dry area is preferred. Regardless of the season, the area should be readily accessible to EMS-Rescue personnel and their equipment, so they may restock the sector with supplies, or in the event that ambulance transport is required.

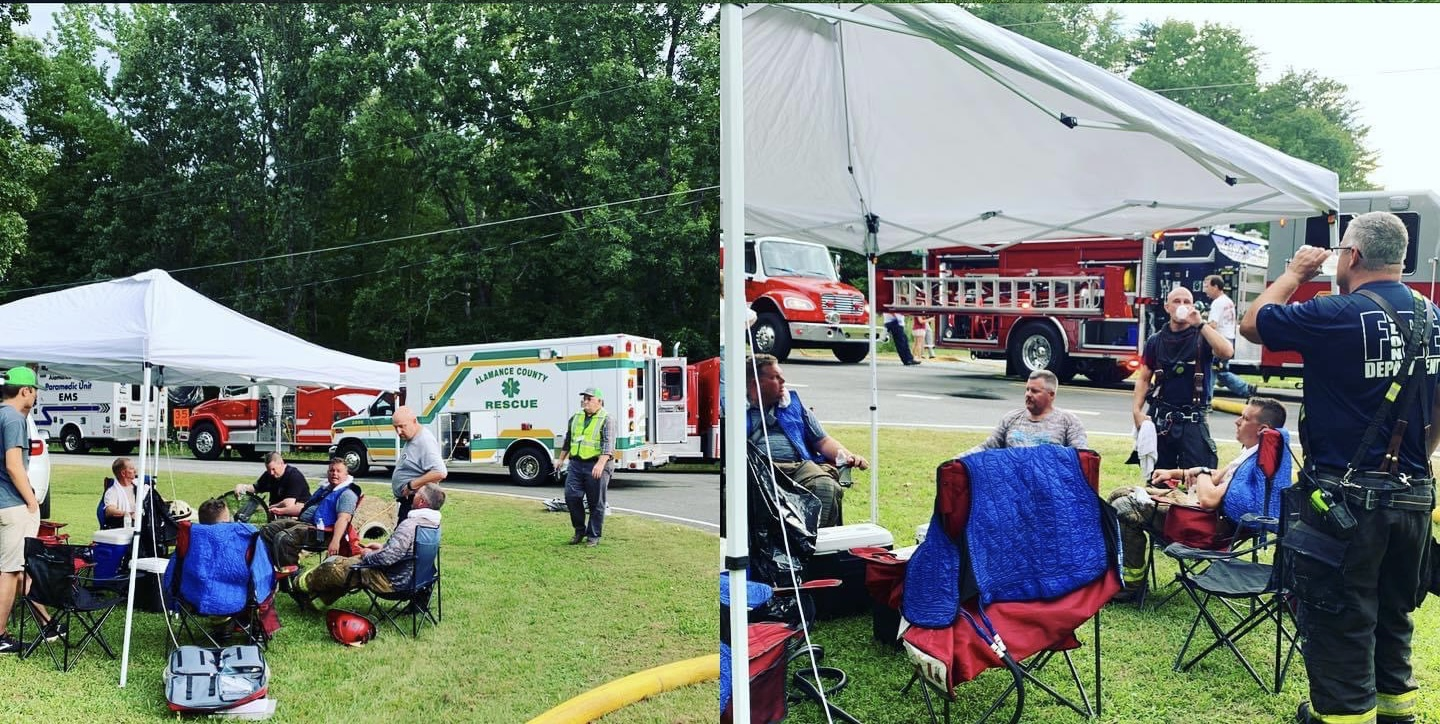
Alamance County Rescue (NC) taking care of firefighters in the rehab tent. Cooling vests (in blue) use flowing water to reduce heat stress.

Rehab sites can take many forms, including lobbies of nearby buildings, parking lots, or grassy areas such as yards, parks, or fields. Specially designed rehab vehicles are also used by many fire departments and EMS agencies.

During large-scale incidents, like multi-alarm fires, multiple rehabilitation areas may be necessary.

Rehabilitation equipment includes but is not limited to:
- Canopy to provide shade
- Misting fans for cooling
- Cooling Vest for quicker metabolic heat removal
- Chairs to provide temporary rest
- Coolers with water and other rehydrating beverages
- Food

== Coordination and manning ==
Command of the rehabilitation area is assigned to a fire chief or company level officer, who is designated as the rehabilitation officer under most incident command structures. A minimum of two trained EMS personnel should initially be assigned to monitor and assist firefighters in the rehabilitation sector, but more personnel may be necessary for larger incidents. Volunteer canteen or auxiliary members often assist EMS personnel in making firefighters as comfortable as possible.

It is important for command and company level officers to continually monitor personnel for telltale signs of exhaustion, stress, and or physical trauma. Individual members are encouraged to report to the rehabilitation sector at any time that he or she feels the need to do so. Symptoms may include weakness, dizziness, chest pain, muscle cramps, nausea, altered mental status, difficulty breathing, and others. The U.S. Fire Administration recommends all fireground personnel (regardless of physical well-being) should report to the rehabilitation sector immediately following strenuous activity, the use and depletion of two self-contained breathing apparatus bottles (or failure of an apparatus), or 40 minutes of intense physical activity.

=== Personnel ===
Some fire departments run their own fireground rehab, either by in house firefighters trained in the medical field or it may be provided by:

- Private non-profit organizations, such as fire buffs (not to be confused with firebugs or arsonists), sparkies and other organizations
- Emergency medical services (EMS)
- First Aid and Rescue Squads
- Rehab services run by private individuals

=== Vehicles ===
Vehicles are needed for transporting supplies to locations where fire personnel are working and may need to be separate from the fire engines which may have limited capacity beyond essential equipment. Examples of vehicles used include:

- Dedicated rehab vehicles
- Converted ambulances
- Converted step vans
- Converted canteen trucks
- Converted buses
- Pickup trucks

== Medical monitoring ==
When firefighters get to the rehabilitation area, they are monitored to prevent life-threatening conditions such as heat stroke and heart attack. Medical monitoring includes:

- Vital signs, such as Respiratory Rate, Blood Pressure, Heart Rate
- Lung Sounds
- Blood Oxygen Levels (typically measured with a pulse oximeter)
- Skin condition and color, Pupils
- Body core temperature
- Administration of a 2-lead EKG, when chest pain or irregular heartbeat is presented
- Scoring on the Glasgow Coma Scale.
- Assessment of Carbon monoxide exposure

Heart rate should be measured as early as possible in the rest period. If the firefighter's heart rate exceeds 110 beats per minute, it is recommended that an oral temperature be taken. If body core temperature exceeds 100.6F, the firefighter should not be permitted to wear protective equipment or re-enter the active work environment, until temperature has been reduced and heart rate decreased.

Psychological first aid should also be available on scene for first responders this focuses on ensuring that the firefighter's emotional needs and well-being are being taken into account for during high stress situations and incidents.

== Standards ==
Firefighter rehabilitation requirements are dictated by standards such as NFPA 1584 "Standard on the Rehabilitation Process for Members During Emergency Operations and Training Exercises".

The Occupational Safety Health Administration has a requirement that affects rehabilitation during an incident which requires transport means if medical attention is needed in another location the unit dedicated specifically for firefighters commonly seen during fires and hazardous materials incidents.

== History ==
NFPA 1500, first released in 1987, was a groundbreaking standard for fire department occupational safety and health programs. It addressed many of the issues contributing to high rates of injuries and fatalities among firefighters. The standard also provided recommendations for reducing these risks, which are inherently high due to the nature of firefighting, by encouraging a proactive approach to limiting dangers.

One critical topic in this standard was the need for fire departments to develop their own Standard Operating Procedures (SOPs) for conducting rehabilitation at emergency scenes. This guidance emphasized the importance of structured rehabilitation practices to safeguard firefighters during and after operations

In 1992, the United States Fire Administration released the report FA-114 Emergency Incident Rehabilitation, which further emphasized the importance of on-scene rehabilitation. This report provided more detailed guidance compared to previous evaluations of the topic. Additionally, the USFA included a sample Standard Operating Procedure (SOP) to assist fire departments in implementing rehabilitation measures.

NFPA 1584, called Recommended Practice on the Rehabilitation of Members Operating at Incident Scenes and Training Exercises, came out in early 2003. While this report was being prepared, the NFPA was updating it for the 2008 edition, changing it from a recommended practice to an official standard.

== See also ==
- Chest pain
- Rehydration
- Smoke Inhalation
- Heat Stroke
- Heart Attack
