= Greaser (subculture) =

1950s and 60s youth subculture in the United States

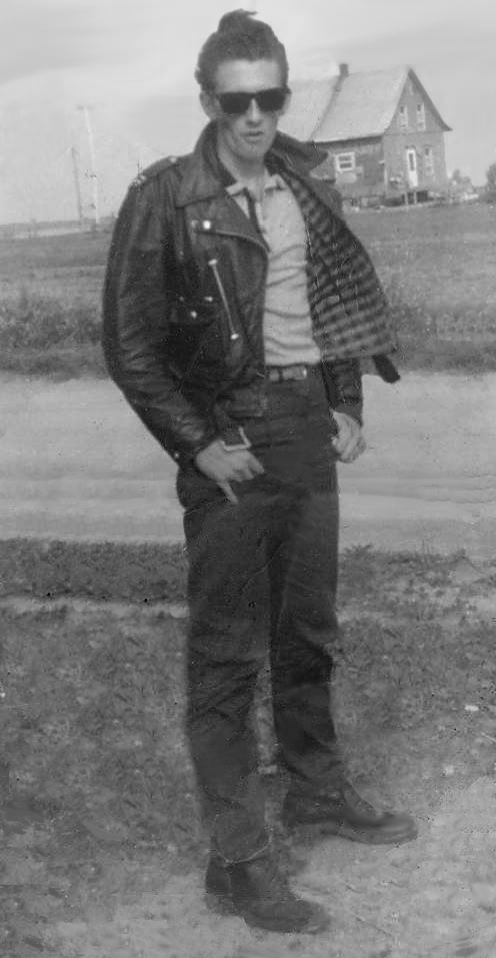
- North American greaser of Quebec, Canada, c. 1960
- Years active: 1950s–1960s
- Country: United States (origins); Primarily Anglosphere countries, including parts of Canada and the British Isles
- Influences: Primarily post-war biker clubs and street gangs
- Influenced: Mods, rockers and later, modern outlaw bikers and punks

Greasers are a youth subculture that emerged in the 1950s and early 1960s from predominantly working class and lower-class teenagers and young adults in the United States and Canada. The subculture remained prominent into the mid-1960s and was particularly embraced by certain ethnic groups in urban areas, particularly Italian Americans, Italian Canadians, Hispanic Americans and Hispanic Canadians.

== History ==
=== Etymology ===
The etymology for the term greaser is unknown. By the time of the Civil War, the words "greaser" and "greaseball" were understood to carry racist and segregationist meanings. It is speculated that the word originated in the late 19th century in the United States as a derogatory label for poor laborers, specifically those of Italian, Greek or Mexican descent. The similar term "greaseball" is a slur for individuals of Italian or Greek descent, though to a lesser extent it has also been used more generally to refer to all Mediterranean, Latino, or Hispanic people. A survey of Cincinnati schoolchildren's impressions of various ethnic groups was conducted in 1931; those who had unfavorable impressions of Mexicans included their characterization as "Greasers".

Academic Jennifer Grayer Moore wrote in her book Street Style in America that the term was not used in writing to refer to the American subculture of the mid-20th century until the mid-1960s, though in this sense it still evoked a pejorative ethnic connotation and a relation to machine work. George J. Leonard, who conceived Sha Na Na, coined the term "greaser" in 1967 after he heard Gilbert Highet read the line "The glory that was Greece" from Edgar Allan Poe's poem "To Helen". However, S. E. Hinton, author of the novel The Outsiders, an influential portrayal of greasers, claimed to know the term from her youth in 1950s Tulsa, Oklahoma. The name was also applied to members of the subculture partly because of their characteristic greased-back hair.

The dominant name for the subculture during the 1950s was hoods, in reference to their upturned collars, with many also calling them J.D.s (abbreviated from juvenile delinquents). Within Greater Baltimore during the 1950s and early 1960s, greasers were colloquially referred to as drapes and drapettes.

=== Origins and rise to popularity ===
The greaser subculture may have emerged in the post–World War II era among the motorcycle clubs and street gangs of the 1940s in the United States and Canada, though it was certainly established by the 1950s, when it was increasingly adopted by ethnic urban youth. (Note: Moore writes that there is ambiguity surrounding the birth of the defining greaser fashion and style, though the associated look is similar to the one displayed by post-war bikers.) The original greasers (often coming from "ethnic" backgrounds) were aligned by a feeling of working class and lower class disillusionment with American popular culture either through a lack of economic opportunity in spite of the post-war boom or a marginalization enacted by the general domestic shift towards homogeneity in the 1950s. Most were male, usually ethnic or white working-class outsiders, and were often interested in hotrod culture or motorcycling. A handful of middle-class youth were drawn to the subculture for its rebellious attitude.

The weak structural foundation of the greasers can be attributed to the subculture's origins in working-class youth possessing few economic resources with which to participate in American consumerism. Greasers, unlike motorcyclists, did not explicitly have their own interest clubs or publications. As such, there was no business marketing geared specifically towards the group. Their choice in clothing was largely drawn from a common understanding of the empowering aesthetic of working-class attire, rather than a cohesive association with similarly dressed individuals. Many greasers were in motorcycle clubs or in street gangs—and conversely, some gang members and bikers dressed like greasers—though such membership was not necessarily an inherent principle of the subculture.

Ethnically, original greasers were composed mostly of Italian Americans in the Northeast and Mexican American Chicanos in the Southwest. Since both of these groups were mostly olive skinned, the "greaser" label assumed a quasi-racial status that implied an urban, ethnic, lower-class masculinity and delinquency. This development led to an ambiguity in the racial distinction between poor Italian Americans and Puerto Ricans in New York City during the 1950s and 1960s. Greasers were also perceived as being predisposed to perpetrating sexual violence, evoking fear in middle-class males but also titillation in middle-class females.

=== Decline and modern incarnations ===
A backlash against the greaser style began to emerge in the early 1960s, and bands such as The Four Seasons were explicitly marketed as cleaner, more polished alternatives to greaser acts (in their case, this required a substantial part of the members' personal lives to be sanitized and rewritten since members such as Tommy DeVito and Frankie Valli had lived the greaser lifestyle in the 1950s). Though the television show American Bandstand helped to "sanitize" the negative image of greasers in the 1960s and 1970s, sexual promiscuity was still seen as a key component of the modern character. By the mid-1970s, the greaser image had become a quintessential part of 1950s nostalgia and cultural revival.

== Culture ==
=== Fashion ===
The most notable physical characteristic of greasers was the greased-back hairstyles they fashioned for themselves through use of hair products such as pomade or petroleum jelly, which necessitated frequent combing and reshaping to maintain. Males sported coiffures adopted from early rock 'n' roll and rockabilly performers such as Elvis Presley and Little Richard, among them the Folsom, Pompadour, Elephant's trunk, and Duck's ass, while females commonly backcombed, coiffed, or teased their hair.

Male greasers typically wore loose work pants such as cotton twill trousers, common among the working class; dark slacks, or dark blue Levi's jeans, widely popular among all American youth in the 1950s. The latter were often cuffed over black or brown leather boots, including steel-toed boots, engineer or Harness boots, combat boots, work boots, and (especially in the Southwest) cowboy boots. Other footwear choices included Chuck Taylor All-Stars, pointed Italian dress shoes, brothel creepers, and winklepickers. Male shirts were typically solid black or white T-shirts, ringer T-shirts, (Note: T-shirts with a contrasting neckband and armbands) Italian knit collared shirts, unbuttoned shirts with sleeveless undershirts underneath, or sometimes just sleeveless undershirts or tank tops (which would have been retailed as underwear). Choices of outerwear included denim or leather jackets (including Perfecto motorcycle jackets). Female greaser dress included leather jackets and risque clothing, such as tight and cropped capri pants and pedal pushers (broadly popular during the time period).

=== Music tastes ===
In the early 1950s, there was significant greaser interest in doo-wop, a genre of African-American music from the industrial cities of the Northeast that had disseminated to mainstream American music through Italian American performers. Greasers were heavily associated with the culture surrounding rock n' roll, a musical genre that had induced feelings of a moral panic among older middle-class generations during the mid-to-late 1950s, to whom greasers epitomized the connection between rock music and juvenile delinquency professed by several important social and cultural observers of the time.

== Portrayal in media and popular culture ==
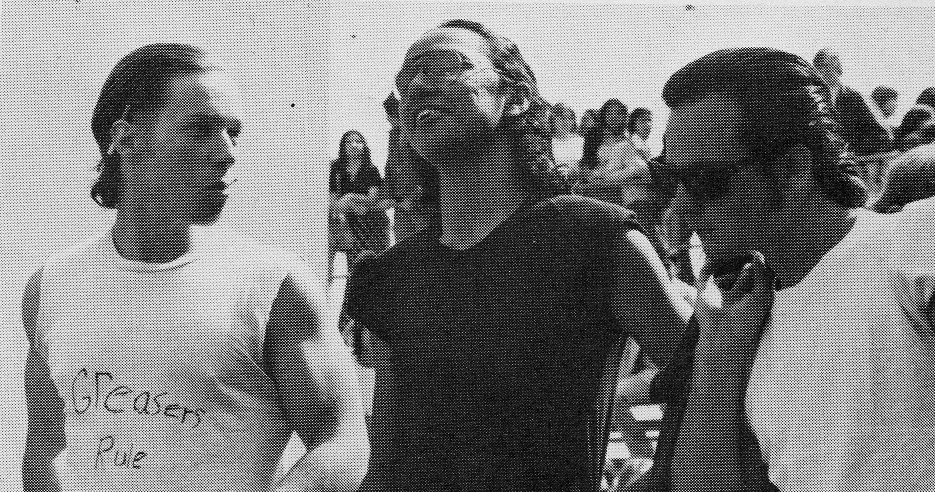
Greaser revival look in 1974

- The first cinematic representation of the greaser subculture was the 1953 film The Wild One.
- The music group Sha-Na-Na, formed in the late 1960s, models their onstage presence on New York City greasers (the band members themselves were mostly Ivy Leaguers).
- The 1967 critically acclaimed young adult novel The Outsiders by S. E. Hinton told the story of a gang of greasers, and was controversial upon release due to its depiction of gang violence. The film adaptation of The Outsiders was released in 1983 and directed by Francis Ford Coppola.
- The 1971 American musical and subsequent 1978 film Grease centers around greasers.
- The 1973 film American Graffiti by George Lucas features greasers including the character John Milner and several members of the fictional "Pharoahs" street gang.
- The 1974 film The Lords of Flatbush by Martin Davidson and Stephen F. Verona feature street teenagers in leather jackets from the Flatbush neighborhood of Brooklyn, New York.
- In the 1974 short story "Sometimes They Come Back" by Stephen King and its 1991 television film adaptation directed by Tom McLoughlin, a group of greasers comes back from the dead to haunt a traumatized teacher.
- Character Fonzie from the American TV show Happy Days is a stereotypical greaser who was frequently seen on his motorcycle, wore a leather jacket, and typified the essence of cool, in contrast to his circle of friends.
- Characters Leonard "Lenny" Kosnowski and Andrew "Squiggy" Squiggman played clownish versions of greasers on the American sitcom Laverne & Shirley, a spin-off of Happy Days.
- The 1990 John Waters film Cry-Baby is a camp reminiscence of Baltimore greasers during the 1950s.
- In the Fallout video game franchise (1997–present) gangs of greasers are commonly encountered in the 1950s-inspired post-nuclear apocalypse setting.
- The 2006 video game Bully featured a social hierarchy in Bullworth Academy that included a greaser clique, made up of working class bike riding teenagers who are often violent to outsiders but loyal to their leader.
- The 2008 Steven Spielberg and George Lucas film Indiana Jones and the Kingdom of the Crystal Skull has the character of Mutt Williams who is portrayed as a greaser.

== Similar subcultures ==
- Rockers, in the United Kingdom
- Teddy Boy, a contemporary but different subculture in the United Kingdom
- Nozem, in the Netherlands
- Raggare and Råner, in Sweden and Norway
- Bodgies and widgies, in Australia and New Zealand
- Bōsōzoku, in Japan
- Halbstarke, in West Germany, Austria and Switzerland
- Guido, similarly associated with Italian-Americans and featuring similar clothing signifiers
- Gadesh, in Baku, Azerbaijan
