= Perfecto motorcycle jacket =

Line of motorcycle jackets from Schott

Schott Perfecto steerhide label.

Perfecto is a secondary brand of "lancer fronted" leather motorcycle jackets designed by Irving Schott and manufactured by the American clothing company, Schott NYC. The first jacket was introduced in 1928, making it the first such styled leather motorcycle jacket. There is some debate as to whether Marlon Brando wore a Schott Perfecto or a replica made by Durable in the 1953 seminal movie The Wild One. Punk rock pioneers The Ramones wore Perfecto jackets in the 1970s and fashion designers such as Jean Paul Gaultier created their variations in the 1980s.

Established as a manufacturer of motorcycle clothing in 1913, Schott, a Russian immigrant, named the brand after his favorite cigar, as he did not think his Jewish family name would sell the garments. It is said to be the first such jacket with zippers and has since come to define the look of motorcycle jackets.

Schott later manufactured a very similar jacket for the Beck label, of which he was previously a representative, called the Beck 333 Northeaster, and in the late 1940s Schott introduced a new jacket based on the original Perfecto design called the 613. It was soon nicknamed the "One Star" because it had a star on each shoulder epaulette. These jackets have a snug, almost tailored fit, which is suited for motorcycle riding, but are short by today's standards.

== Perfecto timeline ==
The 613 and 618 Perfecto have been produced for more than 50 years, so finding out when a vintage jacket was made can be difficult. There have, however, been slight variations in the design over time. Some of the details in the timeline below the overlap.

=== Late 1940s ===
The 613 One Star is introduced, Jackets are made out of horsehide. Neck label is rectangular, black with Perfecto Genuine Horsehide Front Quarter - Style Quality printed in gold letters. TALON main and cuff zippers and 'Miter' belt buckle (rectangular with mitered corners). Side pockets are at an approx. 60° angle and breast pocket at a 50° angle, zippers close up. Jackets have snaps for attaching fur collar, no snaps on collar, plain snaps, sleeves are double stitched, epaulettes are also double stitched and have a rounded end. Stitching on the collar is placed further in than it is on lapels. Lining is black with grid stitching. Straight lower back panel and underside of sleeves are one piece. Inner lower facing and sleeve plackets are made out of faux leather.

=== Early 1950s ===
The 618 is introduced. It is identical to the 613 except for the lack of stars. In The Wild One, the stars on the epaulettes and the snaps on the collar of Marlon Brando's jacket were not original, but added to the jacket. Its popularity and connection to The Wild One movie led to it being banned from sale in many districts of England and the USA and becoming a symbol of rebellious youth.

=== Early 1960s ===
Jackets are made out of steer hide. The Neck label is black with Style Quality Perfecto Genuine Steerhide All Hand-Cut in creme and red letters on coat of arms/crest. Small long white size tag with black letters directly below the neck label. Schott Bros. Inc. printed on leather neck hanger. Stitching on the collar and lapels is placed at the same distance from the edge. Passants have one seam and a pointy end. ESKO cuff zippers. Side pockets are at an approx. 55° angle and breast pocket at a 65° angle.

=== Late 1960s ===
Neck label is black with bull and cactus, Perfecto genuine steerhide - handcut Schott Bros. Small white size tag with red letters directly below neck label.

=== Early 1970s ===
Neck label is square, black with Schott in white curly letters above orange and yellow coat of arms (Griffin and unicorn on the sides of it and an S in the middle). Size tag still on lower edge, white with red numbers.

=== Mid–late 1970s ===
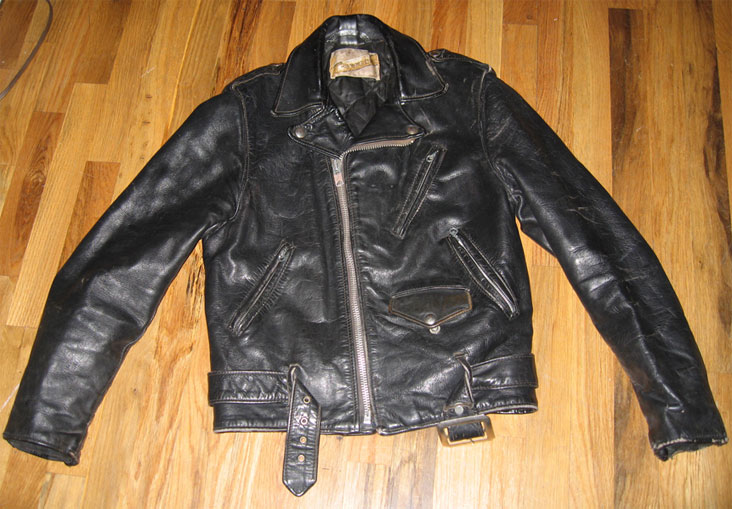
Schott Perfecto 613

Jackets are made out of steerhide (613/618) and naked cowhide (118, introduced in 1977). Neck label is rectangular, creme white with bull in upper left corner, Perfecto in yellow diagonal stripe and by Schott Bros. in lower right corner. Small white size tag with red letters directly to the right of neck label. TALON cuff zippers. Side pockets are at an approx. 55° angle and breast pocket at a 60° angle.

=== Early 1980s ===
Schott NYC appears on neck label, small white size tag with black letters directly to the right of neck label, tag with an American flag and Made in the U.S.A. directly to the right of neck label (under small white size tag). Nothing printed on leather neck hanger. Schott (YKK) main zipper, EMAR cuff zippers, and rectangular belt buckle with oval sides. Pocket zippers now close down. The lining goes all the way down inside of jackets leather sleeve plackets. There is a slight dip in the bottom part of the lower back panel, otherwise straight.

=== Mid 1980s ===
Schott stops producing the 613 One Star. Underarm footballs, two piece underside sleeves, oval lower back panel, inside pocket and snaps on collar are introduced. Snaps for attaching fur collar are removed (no fur collar produced). Snaps have Schott stamped on them. Motorcycle rider instead of bull appears on neck label, size is printed on the American flag tag. Leather inner lower facing. Side pockets are at an approx. 60° angle and breast pocket at a 50° angle (reverse from what they were in the 1960s-70's and more like they were in the 1950s), side pockets are moved further away from the center of the jackets and down a bit. Square thin buckle is introduced.

=== Late 1980s/early 1990s ===
Schott reintroduces the 613 One Star (in steerhide with mid 70's neck label) but without snaps for the fur collar and with inner pocket. Snaps on 613 are plain. Snaps for fur collar back on 618/118. Style 118 is updated to a fuller fit, 613/618 retain original slim fit. Schott NYC chrome main zipper, IDEAL sleeve zippers and bigger square belt buckle (by Century Canada) are introduced. Side pockets are at an approx. 60° angle and breast pocket at a 45° angle.

=== Today ===
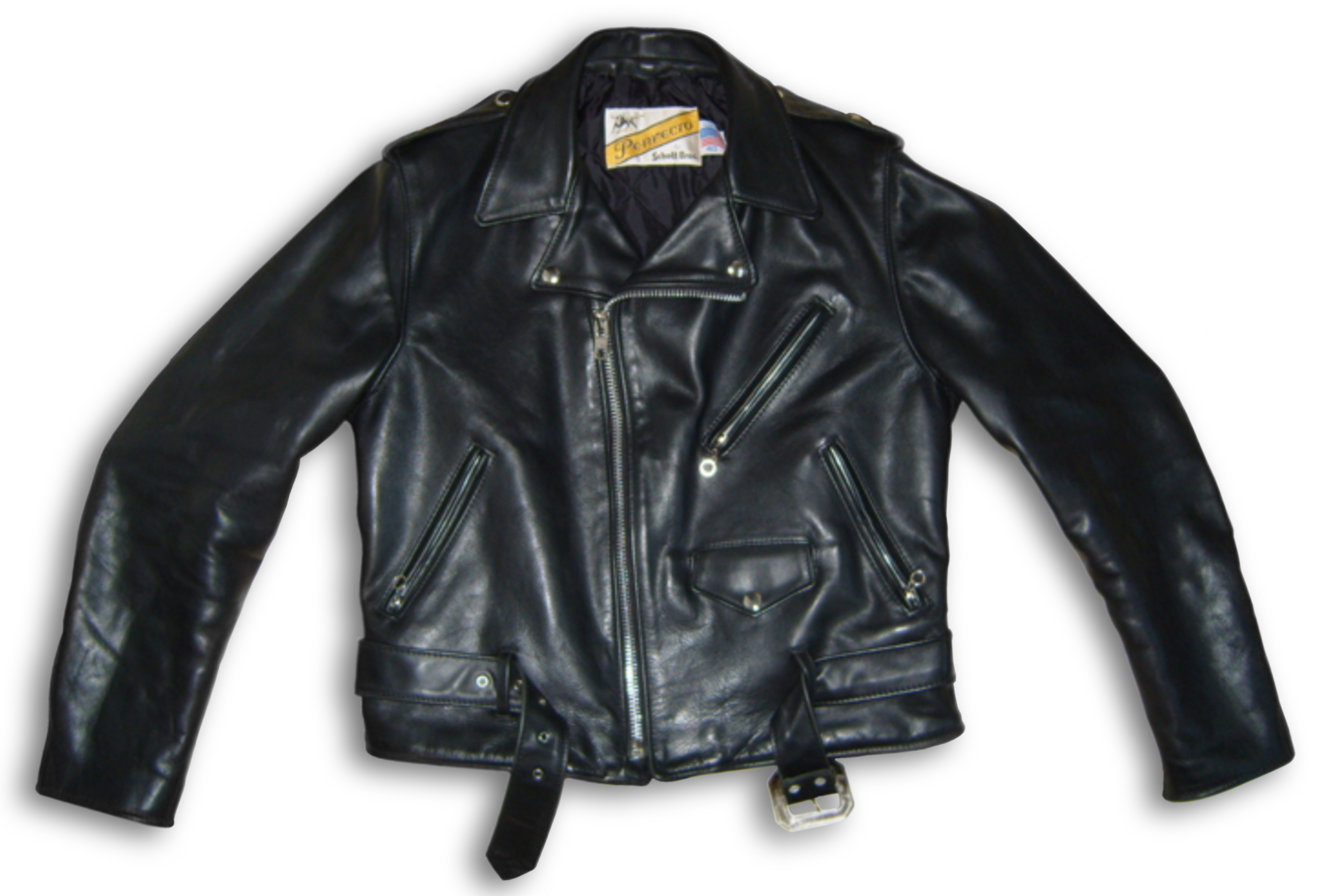
Current production Schott Perfecto 613

Style 118 is fitted with new chrome pocket zippers with different pulls (Schott recently switched back to the original chain zipper pulls) and a snap under the belt buckle to prevent it from damaging the gas tank. The side pockets on the 118 have supposedly been moved closer to the center of the jacket for easier access. Inside map pocket moved to the lower right and a leather trimmed inside breast pocket added on the left. The 613/618 have not been updated since the early 1990s.

== See also ==
- Panzer wrap, a short black leather jacket issued to Wehrmacht tank crews that fastened with buttons rather than a zip.
- Reefer jacket, a hip length double breasted leather coat issued to pilots, German U-boat officers, and Red Army commissars during the Great Patriotic War.
