= Motorcycle armor =

Protective clothing for motorcyclists

Motorcycle armor is body armor for motorcycle riders. It comes in a variety of forms, from traditional yellow foam to high-tech compounds capable of absorbing large amounts of energy. In its basic form an armored jacket will include shoulder and elbow armor, and many jackets can have an optional back protector added too. Trousers should include hip and knee protection, and sometimes a coccyx protector too.

== Types of motorcycle armor ==
=== Foam ===
This armor is either closed cell or open-cell foam and in various densities all the way up to a fairly hard foam used in helmets. Hard foams absorb impact/shock by destructive decomposition so they can only be used to protect for one incident and must be replaced. Soft foams offer little protection with close-cell foams providing a bit more protection than open-cell foams.

=== Memory foam ===
Of foam type armors, memory foam armor achieves a higher level of impact absorption compared to open/closed-cell types above. Memory-foam rebounds slowly after compression. It is a very dense foam.

=== Silicone ===
These are gel type impact/shock absorbers. They are produced in various densities and generally used close to the body for comfort.

=== Hard plastic ===
Hard armor usually consists of a hard plastic and is designed to resist abrasive and puncture injuries. Hard armor generally is used in conjunction with some impact absorbing foam or other material on the inner surfaces facing the body. This is because hard armor by itself does not provide impact/shock absorption qualities.

=== Viscoelastic ===
The use of viscoelastic materials in motorcycle armor has allowed for hand (glove) elbow, knee, shoulder, tail-bone, and back armor to be manufactured in a soft and pliable state at rest. Upon the introduction of shock the armor adopts extremely rigid and protective properties.

Viscoelastic armor is soft and body-forming until it is impacted. At impact it reacts quickly to form a rigid mass. D3O armor hardens edge-to-edge. Sas-Tec armor is considered to be a progressive reactive armor in that it hardens to a degree sufficient to counter the force. The material prevents trauma to the human body by three methods:

1. Shock Absorption: Material absorbs impact energy through phase change (hardening).
2. Shock Delay: Material delays the transmittance of some shock to the human body over a longer period of time.
3. Dissipation: Impacts are dissipated over larger areas of the body.

Viscoelastic armor is able to achieve a higher level of impact-reduction with more comfort and less bulk than traditional hard armor–foam laminate solutions. Hybrid armor is layered with hard shell outer materials. European standard EN-1621 is used to rate the effectiveness of armor. In this standard, a 5 kg flat impactor impacts the armor at a speed of 4.47 m/s (energy 5x4,47x4,47/2=50 J "Joules"). 50 J of energy is roughly equivalent to dropping a 1 kg mass from a height of 5m (E=mGH). Sensors measure how much force is transmitted through the armor, its peak force in kilo-newtons (kN), and its period (how long it took the force to be transmitted). If the force transmitted through the armor is less than 35 kN then the armor (all armor except back) can attain an EN-1621-1 rating. Standard also includes other factors such as temperature stability and coverage area. The back protection standard is EN-1621-2. That standard rating is based on that energy being less than 18 kN (EN-1621-2 Level 1) or less than 9 kN (EN-1621-2 Level 2).

== EN1621-1 Protectors for Limb Joints (Elbow, Knee, Shoulder, Hip) ==
There are three European standards covering "motorcyclists' protective clothing against mechanical impact": EN1621-1, EN1621-2 and EN1621-3. EN1621-1 covers limb joint protectors for knees, elbows, shoulder, and hips. EN1621-2 is the certification standard for Back/Spine protectors, and EN 1621-3 refers to the Chest Protection Standard for Motorcyclists. There are updates to the standards from time to time and so the year the update comes out is added as a suffix to the standard. EN 1621-1:2012, EN 1621-2:2014, and EN 1621-3: 2019-03 are the current standards as of June 16, 2021. All three standards assess the performance of protective devices by measuring the force transmitted through it when impacted by a falling mass.

EN1621-1 assesses products designed to protect the shoulder, elbow and forearm, hip, knee and lower leg regions. The test apparatus consists of a mass of 5 kg ±10g with a 40 mm x 30 mm striking face, dropped onto the sample mounted on top of a 50 mm radius hemispherical dome. The anvil is further mounted onto a load cell, allowing a measurement to be made of the force transmitted through the protector. The kinetic energy of the falling mass at impact must not exceed 50 J.

A protector subjected to this test method is deemed to conform to this standard if the average transmitted force of nine tests is:

- less than 35 kN (EN1621-1 CE Level 1), with no single test result exceeding 50 kN, and
- less than 20 kN (EN1621-1 CE Level 2)

Dr. Roderick Woods at Cambridge University conducted the work that established the CE standard. Originally, there were three levels of protectors: Level 1 would be tested with an impact of 40 Joules, Level 2 at 50 Joules, and Level 3 at 60 Joules. In each case, the protector needed to reduce the mean transmitted force below 25 kN, and no single impact should exceed 37.5 kN. Two Italian manufacturers – allegedly concerned their protectors would not pass the highest standard – successfully lobbied for Level 3 to be removed. It contributed evidence to the assertion that the EU standards for motorcycle PPE have been subject to regulatory capture by manufacturers (a claim reiterated with the advent of EN 17092).

In addition to ambient protection, protectors may optionally be certified to work at high temperatures (above 40 °C / 104 °F) or low temperatures (−10 °C / 14 °F). Protectors that pass these tests will have a T+ or T− marking respectively.

EN1621-2 assesses products designed to protect the back/spine. It is a more stringent standard, using an anvil striker that creates a point load, and allowing no more than 18 kN of force to be transmitted to attain Level 1 protection (EN-1621-2 CE Level 1). Protectors that allows less than 9 kN of force to be transmitted can attain a Level 2 protection (EN-1621-2 CE Level 2). See section below for more information.

Motorcycle airbags are covered by a different standard (EN 1621-4).

== EN1621-2 Back/Spine Protectors ==
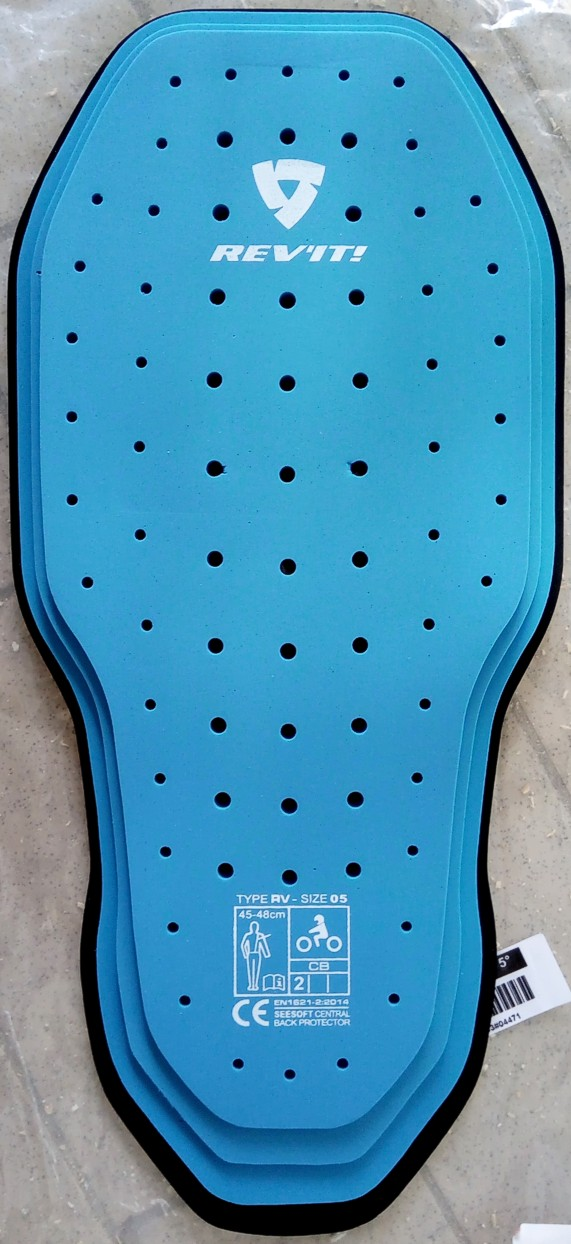
Backpack for motorcyclists of the soft type ("CB" Central Back Protector) and approved level 2

European Standard EN 1621-2:2003 defines two levels of performance for CE approved back protectors. The test apparatus and procedure is similar to that of EN 1621-1:1997, but with a different impactor and anvil configuration. The impactor is a rounded triangular faced prism, of length 160 mm, base 50 mm, height 30.8 mm and radius 12.5 mm. The anvil is a radiused cylinder, with its axis orientated to the direction of impact, of height 190 mm, diameter 100 mm and rounded end radius 150 mm. When tested to the procedure defined in the standard, the two levels of performance are:

- Level 1 protectors: The average peak force recorded below the anvil in the tests shall be below 18 kN, and no single value shall exceed 24 kN.
- Level 2 protectors: The average peak force recorded below the anvil in the tests shall be below 9 kN, and no single value shall exceed 12 kN.

Because of the more delicate nature of the spinal column, back protectors require that lower levels of force be transmitted. The introduction to EN 1621-2 states that approximately 13% of motorcyclists injured in road accidents have an injury to this back region. However, only 0.8% of the injured riders suffer a fracture of the spine and less than 0.2% of injured riders have a serious back injury resulting in neurological damage. This is supported by evidence from the MAIDS Report (2004), the most comprehensive in-depth data currently available for Powered Two-Wheelers (PTWs) accidents in Europe.

A systematic review in 2016 found that too little evidence was available to determine whether motorcycle back protectors are effective. They noted: "back protectors are unable to protect against most spinal injuries, which are caused by bending and torsional forces". More recent work by Afquir et al in 2019 found that "very few injuries linked to posterior-anterior impacts could have been avoided by the use of back protection". They conclude that "the design of back protectors should be reconsidered to better protect riders from what is referred to as compression fractures (craniocaudal force), which remain the primary form of fracture regardless of the rider's characteristics."

== Specifications ==
Standard	Transmitted force	Level	Body Parts
EN1621-1	< 35 kN	Level 1	Elbow, Knee, Shoulder, Hip
EN1621-1	< 20 kN	Level 2	Elbow, Knee, Shoulder, Hip
EN1621-2	< 18 kN	Level 1	Back/Spine
EN1621-2	< 9 kN	Level 2	Back/Spine

== Limitations of current standards ==
Research has revealed limitations of the current standard of motorcycle armor. According to Albanese et al (2017), "The allowable transmitted force of EN 1621-1 may be too high to effectively reduce the probability of impact injury. This is not surprising, given human tolerance levels that are reported in the literature [...] A reduction in the maximum force limit would improve rider protection and appears feasible". Additionally, Meredeth et al (2019) found that shoulder and knee armor need different levels of impact protection. And the CE standard for armor only reduced transmitted force to the shoulder by around 8% (± 5%). They concluded that: "distinct differences in injury protection performance observed between knee and shoulder impact protection indicate that there may be a need for different performance criteria for impact protection designated to protect different body regions".

== Main benefit of armor ==
Liz de Rome et al undertook a cross-sectional study of motorcycle protective clothing and armor. It was described as "the first study in over 25 years to examine the effectiveness of specialised motorcycle protective clothing and in particular, body armor."

The study found "a significant reduction in the risk of open wounds (abrasions, cuts and lacerations) associated with all forms of motorcycle clothing fitted with body armor, and for gloves and pants when body armor was not present. However, there was no evidence of a reduction in the risk of fractures associated with body armor for any area of the body."

While current armor proved inadequate for reducing fracture risk, the armor provided additional abrasion resistance, which was significant because of the high rate of failure of the clothing itself. "The results of the study also send a clear message to the manufacturers of motorcycle protective clothing. The proportion of jackets (29%), pants (28%) and gloves (25%) that failed under crash conditions due to material damage indicates a need for improved quality control."

A later study by Wu et al at Université Lyon analysed the effect of motorcycle protective clothing on 951 riders involved in accidents. It found protective clothing was effective in reducing "abrasions/lacerations rather than contusions." However, it questioned the effectiveness of current body armor: "protective clothing did not reduce the risk of fracture, dislocation, or sprain, except for knee-high or ankle boots, which were associated with lower risk of ankle or foot fracture (RR = 0.43; 95% CI, 0.24-0.75). No effect of back protectors was shown."

== See also ==
- Motorcycle helmet
- Motorcycle airbag
- Outline of motorcycles and motorcycling
