= Schott NYC =

American clothing manufacturing company

- Formerly: Schott Bros
- Industry: Clothing manufacturing
- Founded: New York City, United States (1913)
- Founder: Irving and Jack Schott
- Headquarters: New York City, USA
- Area served: Worldwide
- Products: Leather jackets; Army jackets; Peacoats
- Divisions: Schott NYC; Perfecto Brand
- Website: www.schottnyc.com

Schott NYC (Schott Bros) is an American clothing manufacturing company. They are said to be the first company to put a zipper on a motorcycle jacket, and created the classic Perfecto motorcycle jacket, which was made popular by films such as The Wild One (1953). It is still owned by the Schott family and still manufacture much of their clothing in the United States.

== History ==
Schott NYC was founded in 1913 by brothers Irving and Jack Schott, the sons of Russian Jewish immigrants. Their store was opened on East Broadway on the Lower East Side of Manhattan. The company made clothing for the United States Armed Forces during World War II and later also for American law enforcement.

== The Perfecto motorcycle jacket ==
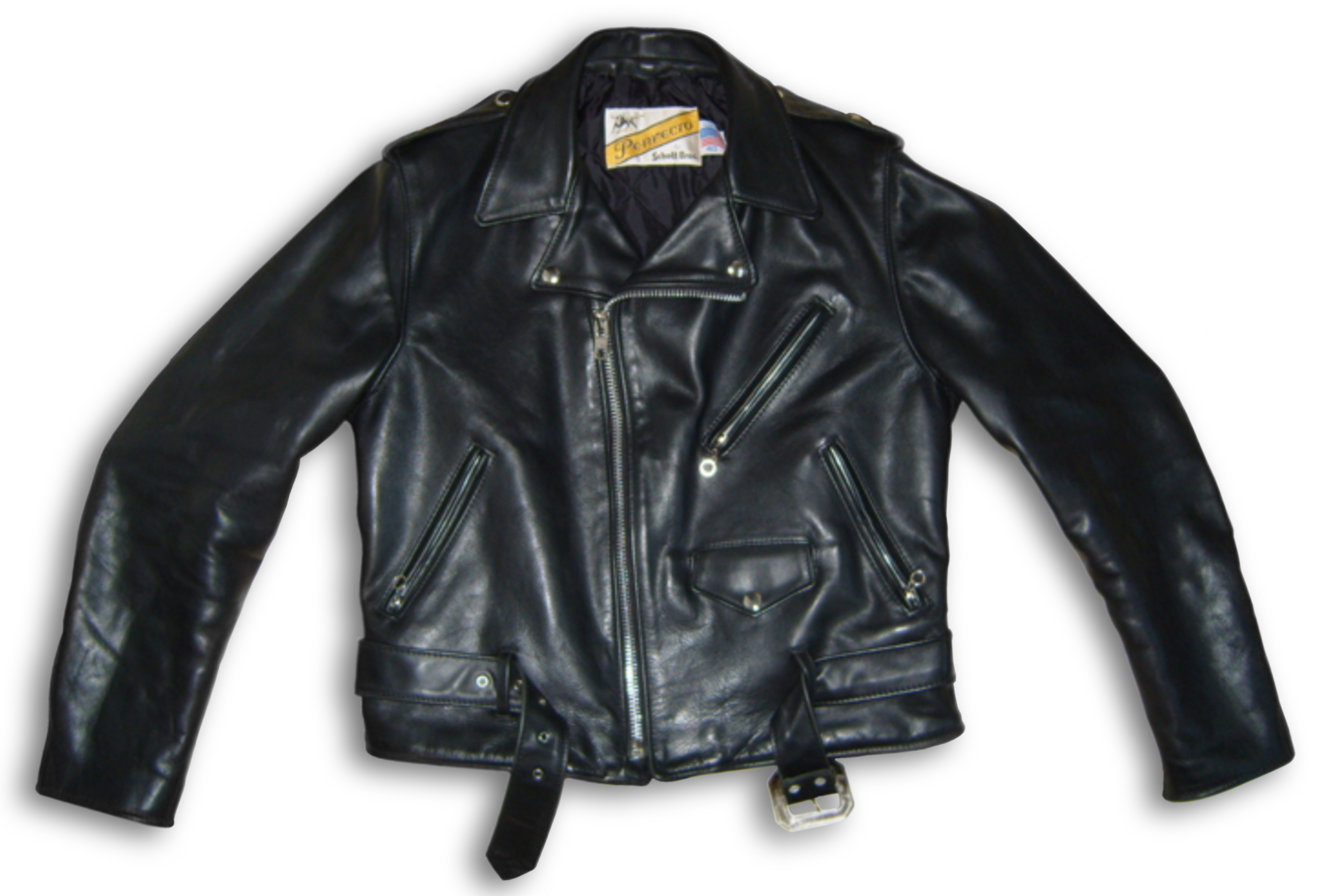
A Schott 613 Perfecto motorcycle jacket

Schott NYC is perhaps most well known for their Perfecto motorcycle jackets. In 1928 Irving Schott designed and produced his first leather motorcycle jacket, and named it the "Perfecto" after his favorite cigar. The jackets were made out of horsehide, had a belted front, D-pocket, flap change pocket, zippered sleeve cuffs and shoulder epaulettes.

The first fully separable zipper was patented in 1927 by Gideon Sundback, and did not come into general production until 1930, after several refinements on his patent. Thus it is unlikely that the classic 'biker's style motorcycle jacket did not appear until around 1930 at the earliest. The 'biker' jacket features a double-breasted, diagonal zipper design. This creates a windproof seal while riding, when zipped up.

In the late 1940s a new design was introduced - the 613. It was nicknamed "the One Star" because it had metal 'nailhead' star studs on each shoulder epaulette. In the early 1950s another version of the jacket was introduced - the 618. The 618 had no stars on the shoulder epaulettes. Stores that carried the jackets often had problems with people stealing the stars of the 613 so the 618 became more commercially viable. Marlon Brando wore a 618 in the movie The Wild One (1953), the stars on his jacket were not original but added to the jacket. There has been no word on where this jacket is today. Because of the film, which was the first outlaw biker movie, the black motorcycle jacket became synonymous with bad attitude and was banned from many American schools during the 1950s.

U.S. seminal punk rock band The Ramones wore Schott Perfecto leather jackets as part of their distinctive uniform look. Japanese rock band Guitar Wolf have their own 613 Perfecto design called 613GW.

== Other classic jacket designs ==
During World War II Schott NYC (being one of several contractors) manufactured the wool naval pea coat for the US Navy. These classic designs are still manufactured by Schott NYC today. Another classic jacket design manufactured by the company is the Café racer leather motorcycle jacket. Café racer jackets are single rider jackets that have a stand (Mandarin) collar. Peter Fonda wore a Café racer style jacket in the movie Easy Rider (1969).
