= Cooling vest =

Piece of clothing to lower body temperatures

A cooling vest is a piece of specially made clothing designed to lower or stabilize body temperature and make exposure to warm climates or environments more bearable. Cooling vests are used by many athletes, construction workers, and welders, as well as individuals with multiple sclerosis, hypohidrotic ectodermal dysplasia, or various types of sports injuries.

== Types ==
Cooling vests range in weight from around 1 to 3.5 kg, depending on the model. While many subtypes do exist, cooling vests fall into one of several primary types:

- Evaporative cooling vests are typically submersed in water for around 3 – 5 minutes and lightly wrung out or blot dried. They are usually worn outside the clothing and as the water in the vest interacts with specially treated cooling crystals or other cooling agents, the water evaporates which then causes body temperature to be reduced. They are lightweight, easy to use, and no electricity is required, making them perfect for people on the move. They are also the most affordable form of cooling vest.
- Ice chilled cooling vests make use of cooling energy packs that are activated inside of a freezer and then placed in pockets inside of the cooling vest. Because they are very cold to the touch, this type of cooling vest is always worn outside the clothes.
- A phase-change material (PCM) cooling vest makes use of packs containing a solid material that absorbs a lot of latent heat on undergoing a phase change from solid to liquid (melting).
- A cool-flow cooling vest makes use of a water flow system that pumps water through the vest using tubes.
- A battery-powered thermoelectric cooling vest uses the Peltier effect to cool its inner surface.
- Radiation cooling garments can dump human heat directly into outer space without requiring an energy source.

== Uses ==
The effects of cooling vests on athletes to improve their performance has been evaluated on several occasions; at the 2004 Summer Olympics several Americans and Australians were fitted with cooling vests supplied by Nike, used prior to their events.

Cooling vests are also used by persons with multiple sclerosis. In multiple sclerosis, nerve fibers become demyelinated, which leads to pain and discomfort when temperature is elevated. Nerve fibers may also be remyelinating or in the process of repairing themselves, and still be sensitive to elevated temperatures. The cooling vest keeps the patient's temperature down, reducing pain. In 2005, a 12-week study at the University of Buffalo was funded by the National Institute on Disability and Rehabilitation Research, a division of the U.S. Department of Education, to determine if people with multiple sclerosis could exercise longer with the help of a cooling vest.

Cooling vests are also used by large workforces in the industrial markets from construction to oil and gas. In 2018, Qatar's Supreme Committee for Delivery & Legacy developed a state-of-the-art cooling suit using evaporative cooling technology to help its 30,000 workforce complete the building of the 2022 World Cup stadiums.

Availability of water-flow cooling vests was mandated in 2025 by the FIA for Formula One motor-racing drivers in hot conditions. Drivers can opt out, but must then carry ballast of equivalent weight to the equipment.
