= Air bag vest =

Personal safety device for motorcyclists and horse riders

The air bag vest is a personal safety device worn by some motorcyclists and horse riders. Airbag vests initially found popularity among equestrian competitors, and airbags have become mandatory in professional motorcycle racing. In 2018, it became compulsory across all classes within the FIM MotoGP World Championship for riders’ race suits to be fitted with airbag systems.

In horse riding, the device is worn over a standard padded vest and is automatically inflated by gas released from a carbon dioxide canister when a tether attached to the horse's saddle is extended during a fall.

While early motorcycle vests followed this approach, the technology has advanced: modern systems use a set of onboard sensors (accelerometer, gyroscope and GPS) that analyze the motorcyclist's movements . An onboard computer uses this sensor data to predict the start of a crash and inflate the airbag before the rider hits the ground or a hard object. Germany's ADAC tested these systems and found that the speed of detection and inflation mattered. More comprehensive research by Ballester et al. also found that the speed of inflation was critical for safety, with tethered systems too slow to inflate in some accident scenarios.

== Description and availability – horse riding ==
The device weighs approximately 2 pounds (0.91 kg) and is worn over a standard protective high density foam vest. Connected by a cord to the horse's saddle, a carbon dioxide canister is punctured when the cord is extended during a fall, inflating the vest in 100 to 250 milliseconds. Unlike car air bags, the air bag vests can be repacked and reloaded for reuse with a new CO_{2} cartridge. Companies that manufacture the vests created them for motorcyclists as early as 1999. The United States Team at the FEI World Equestrian Games in 2010 planned to provide riders with air bag vests.

== Effectiveness in horse riding ==
Studies conducted by the British Transport Research Laboratory showed that the vests improved protection by 69% when worn by riders in conjunction with a standard protective vest and cut the risk of rib fractures and damage to internal organs by 20%. Studies performed by the TRL for Point Two showed a reduction exceeding 55% in the chest compression experienced while wearing the vest compared to unprotected falls, and that chest compression was cut in half of the maximum limit set by the U.S. National Highway Traffic Safety Administration for chest compression in automobile crashes. At a competition in France held in September 2009, rider Karim Florent Laghouag was able to walk away from a fall in which his horse somersaulted over a fence with his only injury a dislocated elbow. Similar types of rotational falls have resulted in the death of 13 riders in the four-year span through 2010.

== Effectiveness in motorcycling ==
In motorcycling, Ballester et al. defined the critical information for airbag efficiency assessment: the zones and levels of torso protection, the impacted surfaces as well as the airbag intervention time and the duration of maintained inflation of the airbag. Also, earlier work by Thollon et al. analysed the effectiveness of airbag protection for reducing thoracic injuries in motorcycle accidents. However, more research is needed regarding neck protection for motorcyclists. Some manufacturers' airbags protect the neck from extreme movement in a crash, but many lack this protection.

Independent research found that current airbags are effective and provide significant impact protection, but only under 30 mph. Initial investigation by ADAC found: “Increased protection potential is primarily only effective in accidents up to 50 Km/h.” In 2019, Thierry Serre et al. published more in-depth research (involving not only impact tests on cadavers but detailed analyses of actual crashes involving riders wearing an airbag). They found that: “The airbag jackets seem to offer limited protection from a threshold speed which can be estimated to an impact around to 30-40 Km/h, but these speeds differ with the impact configuration.”

=== Unmet needs for motorcyclists ===
==== Lower limbs ====
Lower limb damage is the most frequent injury for motorcyclists. Kortor et al. (2010) found: "Lower limb injuries represent the commonest form of injuries among the motorcycle accident victims. Fractures were the commonest type of injury seen and the most common location was shaft of tibia." Jeffers et al. (2004) also found: "Motorcycle accidents continue to be a source of severe injury, especially to the foot." It confirmed earlier work by Southampton General Hospital on the very high prevalence of lower limb damage. Consequently, the Protective Innovations of New Equipment for Enhanced Rider Safety (PIONEERS) research project investigated the effectiveness of fitting a motorcycle with lateral airbags to protect the rider's legs. The lateral airbags proposed by PIONEERS and Ducati could have merit because it had previously been discovered "that crash bars provide a measure of protection to motorcyclist's legs, especially when the impact is from the side." And motorcycles with protruding cylinder heads were found to protect riders in crashes: "leg injuries were reduced by approximately 50% among riders with boxer engines. These results were statistically significant." Similarly, lateral airbags could reduce leg injuries.

In May 2022, Motorcycle News reported that a Swedish company, Airbag Inside, planned to launch airbag-equipped jeans for motorcycling. A year later, Motorcycle News reported on the launch of airbag-equipped jeans by Mo’cycle. But unlike the lateral airbags tested by Ducati in the PIONEERS study, these airbag-equipped jeans do not protect the lower leg and foot. Unfortunately, "the lower leg is damaged most frequently."

==== Back and backside ====
It has been found that back protectors are ineffective, causing the hope that airbags can address this protection deficiency. Ekmejian et al. (2016), Zulkipli et al. (2017) and Afquir et al. (2020) all noted that back protectors fail to protect against the leading cause of spinal injury, compression fractures. In short, “the motorcyclist falls from the motorcycle and onto their buttocks”, and back protectors do not cover this area (although a very few include coccyx protection). This failing also applies to airbags, which usually fail to cover the tailbone or backside. Afquir et al. argued that the design of back protectors needs a rethink, and this finding applies equally to airbags for motorcyclists.

== Certification ==
=== Airbag standards for motorcycle riders ===
In 2013, the European Committee for Standardization created a standard for motorcyclists’ airbags (EN 1621-4). It specified the minimum inflation speed, inflation duration, inflation volume and amount of force absorbed. There are two levels of performance: level 1 for airbag systems with adequate protection and level 2 for airbags with enhanced impact absorption.

While the manufacturers of most electronic systems have certified their airbags to the European standard, it was developed for mechanically operated airbags. Crucially, the standard does not consider the effectiveness of their computer algorithms, in which crash scenarios the airbag will or won't trigger, or how well the manufacturer's processes keep the algorithm updated.

Research by Raúl Aranda-Marco et al., published in 2020, found serious limitations in the European standard for airbags (EN 1621-4). In 2021, PIONEERS research found that a more severe test (compared to the European standard) was closer to an actual crash scenario.

=== Airbag standards for horse riders ===
Following a detailed research project funded by the Injured Jockeys Fund and conducted by independent test house SATRA in conjunction with the British Racehorse Authority, a standard was established for the use of airbag vests by jockeys, and an amended version covering the use of airbag vests for riders across all other equestrian disciplines.

- SATRA M38: February 2013 – Requirements for air-vests, for use in horse riding, intended to give protection in the event of a fall to the ground
- SATRA M39: February 2013 - Requirements for jockeys' body protectors additionally incorporating airbag technology.

The SATRA standards cover ergonomics, the total area covered by the airbag, impact attenuation, activation force, lanyard strength, lanyard length, inflation speed and pressures. Most air jacket manufacturers have adopted these standards.

== Motorcycle airbag usage by professional motorcyclists ==
In MotoGP racing, airbags have been worn since 2007 and compulsory since 2018. Japanese police motorcyclists have used lanyard-based airbags for many years, and other police riders have used them for some time too (e.g. advanced riding instructors at Thames Valley Police Driving School, UK). In 2019, Britain's Gloucester police became one of the first police forces to equip its riders with electronically triggered airbags.

== Airbag-equipped helmets for motorcycling ==
In December 2022, Motorcycle News reported on helmet manufacturer Airoh collaborating with Swedish safety firm Autoliv to produce an airbag-equipped helmet: "Airbag systems are nothing new in biking. Once a safety net reserved for the MotoGP elite, they’re now found in everything from standalone vests to adventure jackets, to bespoke leathers. However, Italian company Airoh wants to take this a step further by integrating the explosive safety technology into a motorcycle helmet – revealing a striking prototype model at this year’s Milan show in early November."
