= Adrienne Asch =

Bioethicist, disability rights activist, and Yeshiva University professor

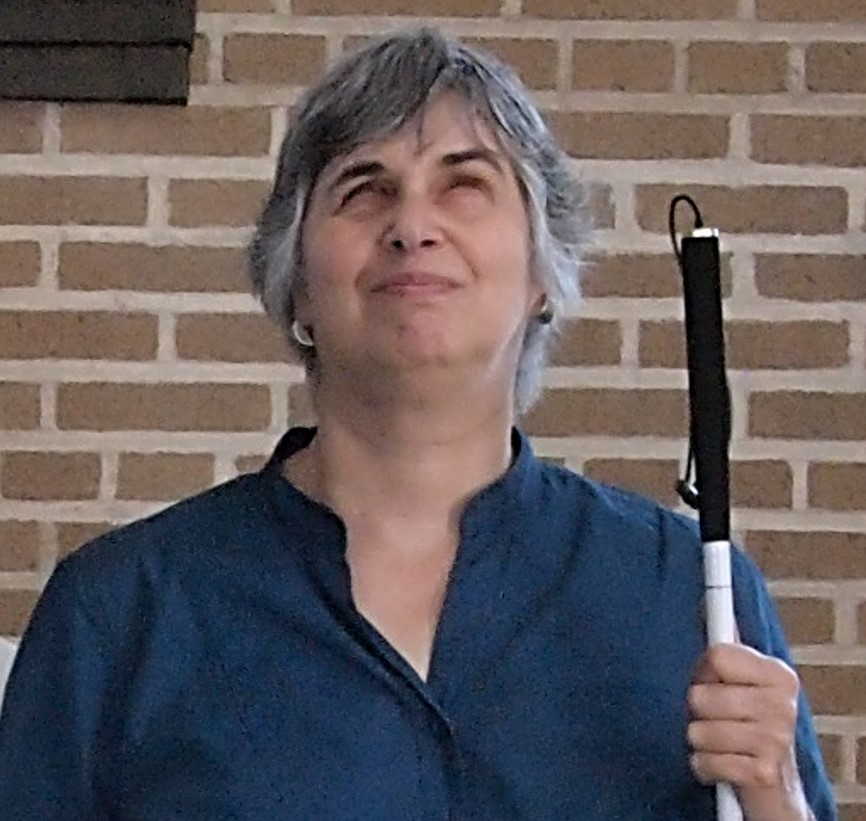
- Prof. Adrienne Asch, 2011
- Born: Adrienne Valerie Asch; September 17, 1946; New York, New York, USA
- Died: November 19, 2013 (aged 67); Manhattan, New York, New York, USA
- Occupations: Social worker, university professor
- Known for: Bioethics, Disability rights

Academic background
- Education: Swarthmore College; Columbia University
- Doctoral advisor: Morton Deutsch

Academic work
- Institutions: Boston University; Wellesley College; Yeshiva University

Adrienne Asch (September 17, 1946 – November 19, 2013) was a bioethics scholar and the founding director of the Center for Ethics at Yeshiva University in New York City. She was also the Edward and Robin Milstein Professor of Bioethics at the Wurzweiler School of Social Work and Professor of Epidemiology and Population Health at Albert Einstein College of Medicine, which are both graduate professional schools at Yeshiva University. She also held professorships in epidemiology and population health and in family and social medicine at Yeshiva's Albert Einstein College of Medicine.

== Early life and education ==
Asch was born in New York City to Ruth Asch (née Sprung) and Julian Asch in 1946. Her birth was premature, and she became blind at a few weeks old from retinopathy of prematurity as a result of too much oxygen in her incubator. Asch grew up in Ramsey, New Jersey, where she attended school in the Ramsey Public School District.

She received a bachelor's degree in philosophy from Swarthmore College in 1969 and a master's degree in social work from Columbia University in 1973. She opened her own private practice in 1979. Before studying for her Ph.D. in social psychology in Columbia University, which she received in 1992, she worked in the New York State Division of Human Rights as an investigator of employment discrimination cases. Asch also trained as a family therapist, and earned a certificate from the Institute for Contemporary Psychotherapy in 1981.

== Career ==
Before becoming the Director of the Center for Ethics at Yeshiva University, Asch was professor of women's studies and the Henry R. Luce Professor in biology, ethics and the politics of human reproduction at the Boston University School of Social Work and Wellesley College in Massachusetts. Although she supported a woman's right to choose abortion, Asch took a disability justice approach in her opposition to prenatal testing and abortion that would stop pregnancies carrying disabled fetuses. She wrote and lectured extensively on the topic.

In an article in The American Journal of Public Health in 1999, Asch discussed the topic of prenatal testing for disabilities:

"If public health espouses goals of social justice and equality for people with disabilities — as it has worked to improve the status of women, gays and lesbians, and members of racial and ethnic minorities — it should reconsider whether it wishes to continue the technology of prenatal diagnosis. My moral opposition to prenatal testing and selective abortion flows from the conviction that life with disability is worthwhile and the belief that a just society must appreciate and nurture the lives of all people, whatever the endowments they receive in the natural lottery.”

Asch helped to develop guidelines for end-of-life care with the Hastings Center, and was a strong voice for the inclusion of people with disabilities in conversations about bioethics. Asch also worked with assistive technology designers, advising on how to make devices more suited for academic needs.

Asch died at her Manhattan home in 2013, age 67, from cancer.

== Works ==
=== Books ===
- Alper, Joseph S.; Ard, Catherine; Asch, Adrienne; Beckwith, Jon; Conrad, Peter; Geller, Lisa N., eds. (2002). The Double-Edged Helix: Social Implications of Genetics in a Diverse Society. Baltimore, MD: Johns Hopkins University Press. ISBN 9780801879265. OCLC 607075918.
- Parens, Erik; Asch, Adrienne, eds. (2000). Prenatal Testing and Disability Rights. Georgetown University Press. ISBN 978-0878408047. OCLC 875749973.
- Asch, A., as co-author with Schiff, A. R., the New Jersey Commission on Legal and Ethical Problems in the Delivery of Health Care (1992). After Baby M: The Legal, Ethical, and Social Dimensions of Surrogacy. Trenton, NJ: The New Jersey Commission on Legal and Ethical Problems in the Delivery of Health Care.
- Asch, A., as contributing member of the New Jersey Commission on Legal and Ethical Problems in the Delivery of Health Care (1990). Problems and Approaches in Health Care Decision Making: The New Jersey Experience. Trenton, NJ: The New Jersey Commission on Legal and Ethical Problems in the Delivery of Health Care.
- Fine, Michelle; Asch, Adrienne, eds. (1988). Women with Disabilities: Essays in Psychology, Culture, and Politics. Temple University Press. ISBN 9780877226697. OCLC 1261839093. Archived from the original on February 22, 2014. Recipient of the 1989 Distinguished Publications Award of the Association for Women in Psychology.
- Asch, A., et al. (1984). Building Community: A Manual Exploring Issues of Women and Disability. New York: Educational Equity Concepts, Inc.
