= Maurice Paprin =

American businessman and activist

Maurice Sanford Paprin (August 26, 1920 – November 29, 2005) was a New York City real estate developer and social activist.

== Biography ==
Born to a Jewish family on August 26, 1920. Paprin graduated from Townsend Harris High School in 1936 and City College in 1941. He gained an MA in history from the University of Wisconsin–Madison and taught briefly at New York University, but pressures arising from McCarthyism eased him out of academia. He began to work for his father's restaurant business and became acquainted with Democratic party officials in Queens.

In the 1960s, Paprin began building low-cost real estate in Queens and in several locations in Manhattan, including the Lower East Side. He became involved in civil-rights and anti-Vietnam War activism. With Robert Boehm, he co-founded the Fund for New Priorities in America, which organized antiwar teach-ins and mobilized people to press for a ceasefire. He continued this tradition by being a prime funder of the Military Families Support Network during the first Persian Gulf War of 1990–91. The grassroots anti-war group comprised the first time in US history that active duty troops' own families had organized to protest against the war their relatives had been deployed to fight. The MFSN motto was "Support the Troops-Oppose the War". He was a prominent supporter of such politicians as Edward M. Kennedy, George McGovern, and, later, Dennis Kucinich.

Paprin remained a force on the New York real-estate and social-activist scene into the 2000s. In his later years, his foremost concerns were educating young people worldwide—he was a key backer of the organization iEARN — and campaigning for the release of Lori Berenson, an American woman held captive in Peru. He also supported The New School and the Council on Hemispheric Affairs.

== Family ==
Paprin's sister, Eugenia, married Ewart Guinier, the prominent civil-rights activist; Harvard University law professor Lani Guinier was Paprin's niece.

== Personal life and death ==
Paprin married twice. His first wife, Rita Most, died in 1980.

In 1982, he married Jacqueline Stuchin Paprin. Paprin had three sons: Seth Paprin, Yale I. Paprin, and Frederick R. Paprin; a daughter, Dr. Judith E. Paprin; and two stepsons, Dr. Steven A. Stuchin and Miles M. Stuchin.

Paprin died on November 25, 2005, aged 85, from a fall. Services were held at the Riverside Memorial Chapel.
