= Center for Ethics at Yeshiva University =

Research institute in New York City, New York

The Center for Ethics at Yeshiva University is a nonsectarian research, teaching, and programming institute based at Yeshiva University in Manhattan, New York City, New York. It fosters research on ethical issues and the integration of discourse on ethics into the curriculum among Yeshiva University's schools. The Center for Ethics seeks to provide opportunities for interdisciplinary collaboration among Yeshiva University's schools. It was established by a donation from Israel Rogosin.

== History ==
The Center for Ethics at Yeshiva University was established by a one-million dollar gift of industrialist and philanthropist Israel Rogosin. Its purpose was to promote teaching and research on "the history, philosophy and practical applications of Jewish ethics". It now fosters research on ethical issues and the integration of discourse on ethics into the curriculum among Yeshiva University's schools. The Center for Ethics seeks to provide opportunities for interdisciplinary collaboration among Yeshiva University's schools.

== Campus ==
The Center for Ethics is housed at the Yeshiva University's Graduate Center on its Wilf Campus at 55 Fifth Avenue in New York's Washington Heights, Manhattan neighborhood.

== Academics ==
The Center for Ethics' activities include:

- the creation of new courses and curricular materials for undergraduate and professional education
- lectures, workshops, and conferences with leading international scholars and experts from across the spectrum of Jewish thinking
- faculty seminars examining particular themes and topics, resulting in the publication of original research

In 2010, the Center for Ethics began publishing an online ethics series that focused on Ethics in Public Life, featuring works by the center's faculty and others from the Yeshiva University community.

== Faculty ==
Adrienne Asch, the center's director, is the Edward and Robin Milstein professor of bioethics at Wurzweiler School of Social Work and a professor of epidemiology and population health at Albert Einstein College of Medicine, both Yeshiva University graduate professional schools.

The Center for Ethics hosts the Leonard and Tobee Kaplan Scholar-in-Residence program, designed to provide opportunities for interdisciplinary collaboration among Yeshiva University's schools. In 2007, Michael Walzer served as the center's inaugural scholar-in-residence. In 2008, Onora O'Neill served as scholar-in-residence, followed by Kwame Anthony Appiah of Princeton University in 2009.
