= The Hotel Carver =

Hotel in Pasadena, California, United States

Coordinates: 34.143810°N 118.150732°W

- Interactive map of the The Hotel Carver area

General information
- Location: 107 S. Fair Oaks Avenue, Pasadena, California, U.S.A.
- Construction started: 1880s

Technical details
- Floor count: 3

The Hotel Carver is a three-story Victorian Building with full basement at 107 S. Fair Oaks Avenue in Pasadena, California. It was built in the late 1880s as part of the Doty Block in the Old Pasadena district. According to sources at the Pasadena Museum of History, it originally was a showroom for a stage coach or carriage company. In later years it was a freight depot for the Pasadena and Los Angeles Railroad, which became part of the Pacific Electric Railway, and which is indicated by the faded "Pasadena and Los Angeles" sign on the South wall. In the early 1900s the building was converted to the Hotel Mikado and served the Japanese American community.

In the 1940s it was purchased by Percy Carter and his family, and became Pasadena's first black-owned hotel. The name was changed to "The Hotel Carver," after George Washington Carver. It was directly across the street from the Hotel Green. The Green catered to prominent white clientele, while the Carver served African American clientele. It was similar to the Dunbar Hotel in Los Angeles. The Blue Room was the dining room on the second floor and the basement held the nightclub called at one time The Onyx Club and later The Club Cobra where many famous, but unconfirmed musicians were reported to have played. In the 1950s, as part of a widening of Fair Oaks Avenue, the Victorian bay windows and turret on the southeast corner were removed from the building and similar structures were removed from other buildings to the north. In its later years, The Hotel Carver was operated by Percy Carter's sons, Percy Jr., Robert, and Littleton.

In 1970 the hotel was sold to an owner who changed the building into art studios on the upper floors and the Pasadena Repertory Theatre under artist director Duane Waddell in a large space on the ground floor. In 1973, the Pasadena Repertory Theatre won the Los Angeles Drama Critics Circle Award for Best Director, Gill Dennis, and Best Screenplay, David Storey, for their production of In Celebration. Later productions included the world premiere of Academy Award nominated (Coal Miner's Daughter) screenwriter Tom Rickman's play Balaam starring Academy Award nominee Elizabeth Hartman (A Patch of Blue), Peter Brandon {Altered States, Another World, Dallas, The Waltons), Howard Whalen, and was the theatrical debut of Ed Harris (The Right Stuff, Jackson Pollock). The Pasadena Repertory Theatre also hosted the west coast premiere of Tennessee Williams' Kingdom of Earth, which was the retitled Broadway play The Seven Descents of Myrtle. It was directed by Elizabeth Hartman's husband, Gill Dennis and starred Ed Harris, Marie Peckinpah (née Selland), and Duane Waddell. The resident acting teacher for the Pasadena Repertory Theatre was Florence MacMichael (Woman Obsessed, Gunsmoke, Twilight Zone, Mr. Ed, Alfred Hitchcock Presents, Bonanza).

During the years from 1970 until the building was sold in 1985, The Hotel Carver, as it was still called by its residents, held the studios of well over 100 artists, writers, musicians, directors, dancers, tapestry weavers, and other artists. Tenants during parts of that time included notables such as the Latino soul band El Chicano, performance artist Paul McCarthy, Howard the Duck comic book creator Steve Gerber, the writer-director Gill Dennis, who later wrote the Oscar-winning (best actress Reese Witherspoon) biopic of Johnny Cash, Walk the Line, the painter-muralist Betty Dore, the painter and long-time preparator of the Norton Simon Museum James Mayner, the director-writer-cinematographer J. Robert Wagoner (Disco Godfather, Black Fantasy), the prominent jazz bass player Herbie Lewis, artist-weavers Margo Farrin and Gail Stephenson, artists Jack McIntosh, Hap Tivey, Paul Waszink, Ron Benom, Milan Tomovich, and dancers Helga deKansky, Pat Turnbull, Collie Valadez, and many other artists.

From the 1970s through the late 1980s a controversial mural adorned the north facade of The Hotel Carver. It was a simple quotation, painted in tall, dark green letters on a cool gray background. It said, "'My people are the people of the dessert,' said T.E. Lawrence, picking up his fork." It was partially destroyed in the 1987 Whittier Narrows earthquake, and later painted over after the building was repaired. It had been painted by Paul Waszink, and was the subject of much speculation thereafter. In the early 1980s The Hotel Carver changed owners twice. Then in mid-April, 1985, all tenants entering the building encountered 30-day eviction notices nailed into every entrance door. The remaining tenants immediately organized a final art exhibit titled "The End of the Hotel Carver," that filled the ballroom, the old Blue Room, and most of the vacant spaces throughout the building. It included works by over 40 artists who had worked in the building over the years.

By June, 1985 The Hotel Carver was empty. The building was later remodeled and earthquake retrofitted. The interior was gutted of its redwood framing to install an elevator and more modern steel framework. The massive ornate wooden staircase with turned wood balustrade was removed. The original lath and plaster was replaced with plaster board. The steel fire escapes on three sides of the building were all removed. Eleven years later, as part of a large art festival in Old Pasadena sponsored by Newtown Pasadena, a group of artists from the Carver came together for a one-evening reunion art show on the sidewalk in front of the building called "A Brief Re-birth of The Hotel Carver."
