= Eastwick Foundation =

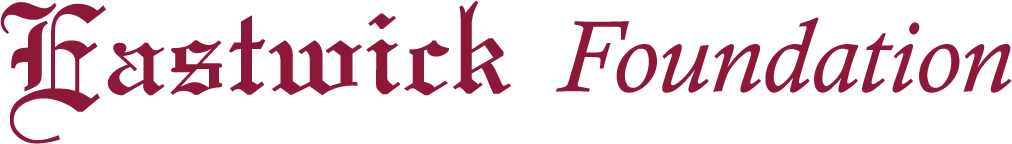
- Founded: 2007
- Founder: Thomas Eastwick
- Type: 501(c)(3) nonprofit organization
- Purpose: Scholarships, hunger relief, Literacy
- Headquarters: Ramsey, New Jersey, United States
- Region served: New Jersey
- Key people: Jeanne Patrican, Executive Director
- Parent organization: Eastwick College
- Website: eastwickfoundation.org

Eastwick Foundation is a 501(c)(3) non-profit organization based in Ramsey, New Jersey. Founded in 2007 as the philanthropic arm of Eastwick Colleges, the Foundation awards need‑based scholarships to students at Eastwick's four campuses and the affiliated HoHoKus School of Trade & Technical Sciences while also underwriting local hunger‑relief and literacy initiatives.

== History ==
Eastwick Foundation was founded in 2007 by Thomas M. Eastwick.

== Programs ==
=== Eastwick Elite Scholarships ===
Eastwick Foundation provides scholarships to students at Eastwick College and the HoHoKus School of Trade & Technical Sciences.

Eastwick College and the HoHoKus School of Trade provide scholarships twice each year, one in the spring and one in the fall. During each period, they award approximately 12-20 scholarships, with amounts ranging from $1,000 to $2,500. They also provide other scholarships throughout the year, including an Emergency Scholarship Fund.

Eastwick College students also receive a book scholarship and a laptop, collectively valued between $2,500 and $3,000. Students at the HoHoKus School of Trade receive a tool scholarship valued between $400 and $600. High school students who enroll in the HoHoKus Trade School Blended Learning Program receive a scholarship ranging from $1,000 to $2,000.

=== Feed The Hungry ===
Feed The Hungry is the main community support initiative of the Eastwick Foundation. In this program, students and staff host fundraising events to support local food banks and each contribution is matched by the president of Eastwick College.

In 2023, the program allocated $55,000 to 11 local food banks; the same target has been set for 2024.

Since its inception in 2013, it has distributed $405,000, with half contributed by the President of Eastwick and half by donors.

== Leadership ==
- Jeanne Patrican (executive director)
