= Lani Guinier =

American legal scholar and civil rights theorist (1950–2022)

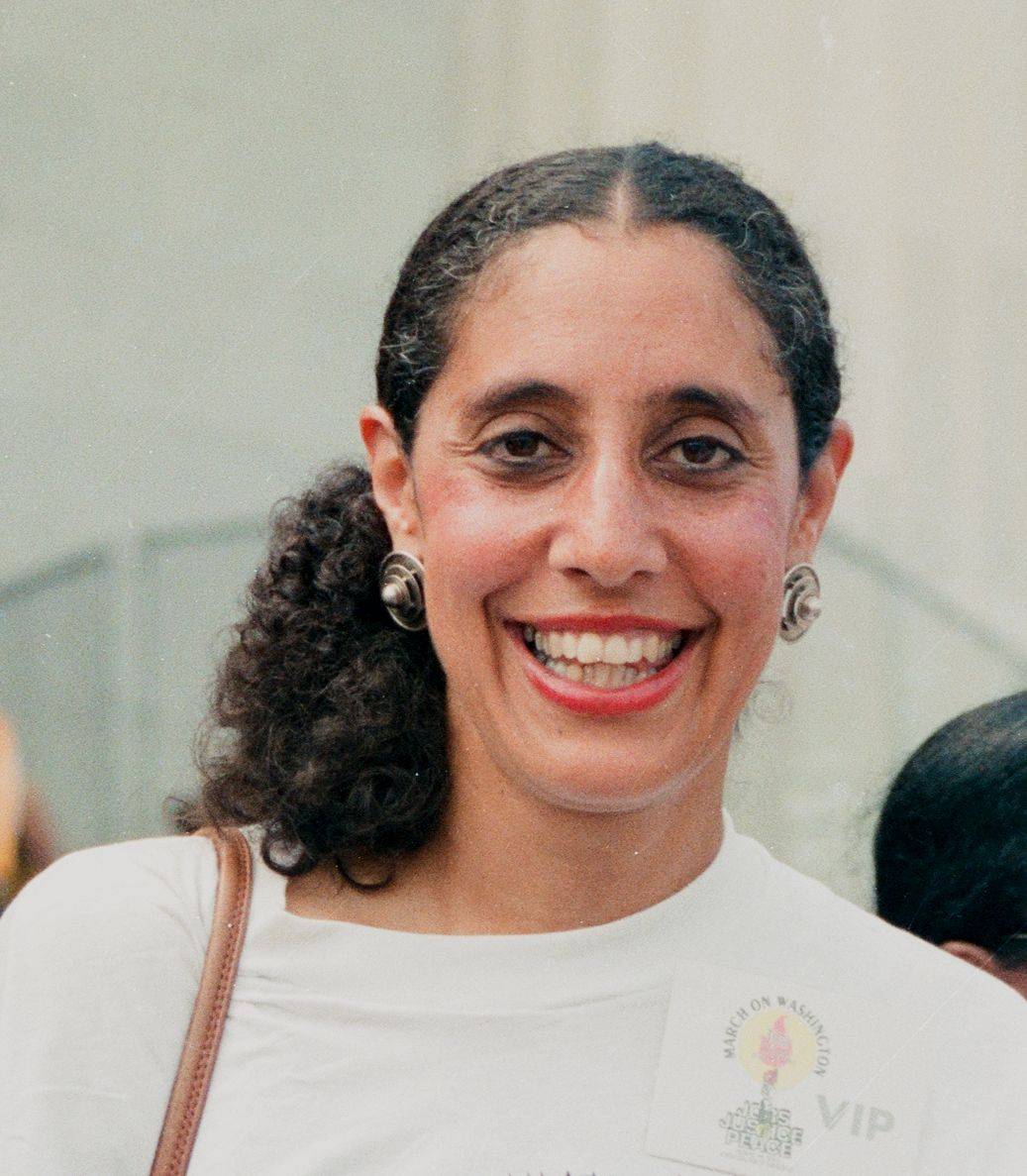
- Guinier in 1993
- Born: Carol Lani Guinier; April 19, 1950; New York City, U.S.
- Died: January 7, 2022 (aged 71); Cambridge, Massachusetts, U.S.
- Education: Radcliffe College (BA); Yale University (JD)
- Occupations: Attorney; Author; Law professor
- Relatives: Ewart Guinier (father); Maurice Paprin (uncle); Nikolas Bowie (son)

Carol Lani Guinier (/ˈlɑːni ɡwɪˈnɪər/ LAH-nee gwin-EER; April 19, 1950 – January 7, 2022) was an American educator, legal scholar, and civil rights theorist. She was the Bennett Boskey Professor of Law at Harvard Law School, and the first woman of color appointed to a tenured professorship there. Before coming to Harvard in 1998, Guinier taught at the University of Pennsylvania Law School for ten years. Her scholarship covered the professional responsibilities of public lawyers, the relationship between democracy and the law, the role of race and gender in the political process, college admissions, and affirmative action. In 1993, President Bill Clinton nominated Guinier to be United States Assistant Attorney General for Civil Rights, but withdrew the nomination.

== Early life and career ==
Carol Lani Guinier was born on April 19, 1950, in New York City, to Eugenia "Genii" Paprin and Ewart Guinier. Ewart, who was born in Panama to Jamaican parents and raised in Panama and Boston, was one of two black students admitted to Harvard College in 1929. He was forced to drop out in 1931, unable to afford school after he was excluded from financial aid and campus housing, but he ultimately returned to Harvard as a professor and the first chair of the Afro-American Studies Department in 1969. Paprin, an Ashkenazi-Jewish civil-rights activist, graduated from Hunter College in 1939. Guinier's parents met in Hawaii Territory, where each was a member of the Communist Party of Hawaii and of the Hawaii Civil Rights Congress. Guinier's father was also a national officer for the United Public Workers of America, a Congress of Industrial Organizations (CIO) union. Her uncle was real estate developer and social activist Maurice Paprin. Guinier moved with her family to Hollis, Queens, in 1956.

Guinier said that she wanted to be a civil rights lawyer since she was twelve years old, after she watched on television as Constance Baker Motley helped escort James Meredith, the first black American to enroll in the University of Mississippi. After graduating third in her class from Andrew Jackson High School, Guinier earned her B.A. from Radcliffe College in 1971 and her J.D. degree from Yale Law School in 1974. She clerked for Judge Damon Keith of the United States Court of Appeals for the Sixth Circuit, then served as special assistant to Assistant Attorney General Drew S. Days in the Civil Rights Division during the Carter administration. She was admitted to the District of Columbia Bar in 1981, and after Ronald Reagan took office, she joined the NAACP Legal Defense and Educational Fund (LDF) as an assistant counsel, eventually becoming head of its Voting Rights project. She was a highly successful litigator for LDF, winning 31 of the 32 cases she argued. She also worked on the successful extension of the Voting Rights Act in 1982.

== Nomination for Assistant Attorney General ==
Guinier was President Bill Clinton's nominee for Assistant Attorney General for Civil Rights in April 1993. Conservative journalists and Republican senators mounted a campaign against Guinier's nomination. Guinier was dubbed a "quota queen," a phrase first used in a Wall Street Journal op-ed by Clint Bolick, a Reagan-era U.S. Justice Department official. The term was perceived by some to be racially loaded, combining the "welfare queen" stereotype with "quota", a buzzword used to challenge affirmative action. Her nomination never recovered; civil rights leaders labeled Clinton as weak for withdrawing the nomination.

In response to the "quota queen" label, Guinier stated that she was opposed to racial quotas by invoking her father: "He was a victim of a racial quota, a quota of one. I have never been in favor of quotas. I could not be, knowing my father's experience."

Some journalists also alleged that Guinier's writings indicated that she supported the shaping of electoral districts to ensure a black majority, a process known as "race-conscious districting." Political science and law professor Carol M. Swain argued that Guinier was in favor of "segregating black voters in black-majority districts." Guinier was portrayed as a racial polarizer who believed—in the words of George Will—that "only blacks can properly represent blacks." Regarding her views on alternative systems, a reviewer commented that "the remedies Guinier advocates for diluted minority voting rights do not include laws that guarantee election outcomes for disadvantaged groups."

In the face of the negative media attention, many Democratic senators, including David Pryor of Arkansas, Ted Kennedy of Massachusetts, and Carol Moseley-Braun of Illinois (the only African American serving in the Senate at that time), informed Clinton that Guinier's interviews with senators were going poorly and urged him to withdraw Guinier's nomination.

Clinton withdrew Guinier's nomination on June 4, 1993. He stated that Guinier's writings "clearly lend themselves to interpretations that do not represent the views I expressed on civil rights during the [presidential] campaign." Guinier, for her part, acknowledged that her writings were often "unclear and subject to vastly different interpretations," but believed that the political attacks had distorted and caricatured her academic philosophies. William T. Coleman Jr., who had served as Secretary of Transportation under President Gerald Ford, wrote that the withdrawal was "a grave [loss], both for President Clinton and the country. The President's yanking of the nomination, caving in to shrill, unsubstantiated attacks, was not only unfair, but some would say political cowardice."

== Civil rights theories ==
=== Alternative voting systems ===
In her publications, Guinier suggested various strategies for strengthening minority groups' voting power, and rectifying what she characterized as an unfair voting system, not just for racial minorities, but for all numerical minority groups, including fundamentalist Christians, the Amish, or, in states such as Alabama, Democrats. Guinier also stated that she did not advocate for any single procedural rule, but rather that all alternatives should be considered in the context of litigation "after the court finds a legal violation."

Some of the ideas she considered are:

- cumulative voting, a system in which each voter has "the same number of votes as there are seats or options to vote for, and they can then distribute their votes in any combination to reflect their preferences"—a system often used on corporate boards in 30 states, as well as by school boards and county commissions
- multi-member "superdistricts," a strategy that "modifies winner-take-all majority rule to require that something more than a bare majority of voters must approve or concur before action is taken."

Guinier's idea of cumulative voting was taken up by Roslyn Fuller as a potential way of protecting minority rights without compromising One Man, One Vote principles.

=== Revising affirmative action ===
From 2001 until her death, Guinier was active in civil rights in higher education, coining the term "confirmative action" to reconceptualize issues of diversity, fairness, and affirmative action. The process of confirmative action, she said, "ties diversity to the admissions criteria for all students, whatever their race, gender, or ethnic background—including people of color, working-class whites, and even children of privilege."

Because public and private institutions of higher learning are almost all to some extent publicly funded (i.e., federal student loans and research grants), Guinier argued that the nation has a vested interest in seeing that all students have access to higher education and that these graduates "contribute as leaders in our democratic polity." By linking diversity to merit, Guinier argued that preferential treatment of minority students "confirms the public character and democratic missions of higher-education institutions. Diversity becomes relevant not only to the college's admissions process but also to its students' educational experiences and to what its graduates actually contribute to American society."

=== "Political race" ===
Developing a concept of "political race," Guinier argued that if viewed as a resource from which to develop social critique, attention to exclusions based on race had the potential to produce broad and democratizing effects. In The Miner's Canary: Enlisting Race, Resisting Power, Transforming Democracy (Harvard University Press, 2002), Guinier and co-author Gerald Torres used the analogy of racial minorities as the canary in the coal mine, alerting others to risks in the environment. As one New York Times review put it, they argue for "reforms based on initiatives that are begun by minority groups but move beyond racial issues because they address the needs of other disadvantaged groups." One examplar Torres and Guinier cite is the way that Hopwood v. Texas, an anti-affirmative action lawsuit, ultimately inspired reform that enlarged college access for all Texas students following minority activists' research on admissions. They found that the majority of admissions to the state's top colleges came from a handful of the state's high schools, prompting a reform that required the colleges to admit the top 10 percent of all high schools. The Times review concluded, "The goal of reaching such truly evenhanded solutions is what this book generously holds out."

== Academic career ==
=== Teaching ===
Guinier began her career in academics in 1989 as a Professor of Law at the University of Pennsylvania Law School. It was there that she took her experience with the Voting Rights Project of the NAACP Legal Defense Fund and began theorizing on reforming the voting system. She spent 10 years at University of Pennsylvania Law School before joining Harvard Law School in 1998 as the school's first woman of color to be granted tenure. She regularly lectured at various other law schools and universities including Yale, Stanford, New York University (NYU), UT Austin, Berkeley, UCLA, Rice, and University of Chicago. In 2007 she was a visiting professor at Columbia Law School, and in 2009 she was a fellow at the Center for Advanced Study in the Behavioral Sciences at Stanford University.

Guinier took emerita status at Harvard in 2017.

=== Publications ===
External videos
- Booknotes interview with Guinier on The Tyranny of the Majority, June 26, 1994, C-SPAN
- Presentation by Guinier on The Miner's Canary, April 12, 2002, C-SPAN

Guinier authored over two dozen law review articles, as well as five books:

- Guinier, Lani (1994). The Tyranny of the Majority: Fundamental Fairness in Representative Democracy. Free Press. ISBN 978-0-02-913172-5.
- Guinier, Lani; Fine, Michelle; Balin, Jane (1997). Becoming Gentlemen: Women, Law School, and Institutional Change. Beacon Press. ISBN 978-0-8070-4405-6.
- Guinier, Lani (1998). Lift Every Voice: Turning a Civil Rights Setback Into a New Vision of Social Justice. Simon & Schuster. ISBN 978-0-684-81145-1.
- Guinier, Lani; Torres, Gerald (2002). The Miner's Canary: Enlisting Race, Resisting Power, Transforming Democracy. Harvard University Press. ISBN 978-0-674-00469-6.
- Guinier, Lani (January 13, 2015). The Tyranny of the Meritocracy: Democratizing Higher Education in America. Beacon Press. ISBN 978-0-8070-0628-3.

== Personal life and death ==
Guinier married Nolan Bowie in 1986. They had one son, Nikolas Bowie, who is also a Harvard law professor.

Guinier died from complications of Alzheimer's disease at a care facility in Cambridge, Massachusetts, on January 7, 2022, at the age of 71.

== Honors ==
During her lifetime, Guinier was honored with the Champion of Democracy Award from the National Women's Political Caucus; the Margaret Brent Women Lawyers of Achievement Award from the American Bar Association (ABA) Commission on Women in the Profession (1995); and the Rosa Parks Award from the American Association of Affirmative Action. She was also awarded the 1994 Harvey Levin Teaching Award at the University of Pennsylvania Law School and the 2002 Sacks-Freund Award for Teaching Excellence from Harvard Law School. In 2015 she was awarded the "Deborah W. Meier Hero in Education Award" from Fairtest. In 2017, she was awarded a Champion of Democracy Award from Fair Vote. In 2021, she received Yale Law School’s highest honor, the Award of Merit.

She received eleven honorary degrees, from schools including Hunter College, University of Illinois Urbana-Champaign, Smith College, Spelman College, Swarthmore College, and Bard College. In 2007 she delivered the Yale Law School Fowler Harper Lecture, entitled "The Political Representative as Powerful Stranger: Challenges for Democracy."
