= Nikolas Bowie =

American legal scholar

- Occupation: Law professor
- Title: Louis D. Brandeis Professor of Law
- Parent: Lani Guinier

Academic background
- Education: Phd History, Harvard University, 2018; JD, Harvard Law School, 2014; A.M. History Harvard University, 2011; B.A. History Yale University, 2009
- Thesis: Corporate America: A History of Corporate Statehood Since 1629 (2018)

Academic work
- Discipline: Law, History
- Institutions: Harvard Law School

Nikolas Bowie is an American legal scholar and historian. He is the Louis D. Brandeis Professor of Law at Harvard Law School, the author of the textbook Federal Constitutional Law, and co-author, with Daphna Renan, of the 2026 book Supremacy.

== Early life and education ==
Bowie grew up in Cambridge, Massachusetts and graduated from Cambridge Rindge and Latin School. His mother was Harvard law professor Lani Guinier.

Bowie attended Yale College, earning a BA in history in 2009, then Harvard University where he earned his MA in history in 2011, JD in 2014 and PhD in history in 2018. His dissertation was entitled Corporate America: A History of Corporate Statehood Since 1629. In law school, he was an editor of the Harvard Law Review and was on the winning team in the Ames Moot Court Competition as an oralist.

== Career ==
Bowie served as a law clerk for Judge Jeffrey Sutton of the United States Court of Appeals for the Sixth Circuit and Justice Sonia Sotomayor of the United States Supreme Court. Bowie joined Harvard Law School as an assistant professor in 2018 and was promoted to professor in 2022. Bowie is on the boards of the ACLU of Massachusetts, City of Cambridge Planning, Lawyers for Civil Rights, MassVote, and People’s Parity Project. Bowie also served on the postconviction and appellate panel of the Committee for Public Counsel Services, the public defender agency of Massachusetts.

Bowie is the Louis D. Brandeis Professor of Law at Harvard Law School. He is the author of the textbook Federal Constitutional Law and of the book Supremacy: How Rule by the Court replaced Government by the People with Daphna Renan. Bowie won the Sacks-Freund Award for Teaching Excellence in 2021, just as his mother did in 2002, from the graduating class. He is frequently featured in the media as an expert on law. He has also provided testimony in Congressional hearings on the Supreme Court. In 2026, Bowie was elected to the National Council of the American Association of University Professors.
