= The Rogosin Institute =

Coordinates: 40.765487°N 73.954307°W

The Rogosin Institute is an independent, not-for-profit treatment and research center with facilities throughout New York City that treat patients with kidney disease, including dialysis and kidney transplantation; lipid disorders; and hypertension. It is affiliated with NewYork-Presbyterian Hospital, Weill Cornell Medical College and is a leader in research programs for cancer and diabetes.

== History ==
The Rogosin Institute has been providing care to patients for fifty two years and pioneered in the treatment of kidney failure and kidney transplantation through hemodialysis.

In 1957, the Rogosin team performed the first hemodialysis in the New York metropolitan area as a treatment for kidney failure. In 1962, the unit became known as the Renal Laboratory and moved to the New York Hospital-Cornell Medical Center where it expanded to the Rogosin Renal Laboratories, named in honor of Israel Rogosin (1886-1971), an American textile industrialist and philanthropist who supported the foundation of the New York Hospital-Cornell Medical Center, by giving a total of 4 million dollars in 1962 and 1965. In 1963, The Rogosin Institute performed the first kidney transplant in the New York area.

With expansion into research and treatment of cardiovascular disease and cancer, The Rogosin Institute became an independent corporate entity in 1983. In 1988, many of The Rogosin Institute's facilities were brought together in The New York Hospital's Helmsley Medical Tower at 70th Street and York Avenue. The historical administrative records of the Institute are housed in the Medical Center Archives of NewYork-Presbyterian/Weill Cornell.

== Specialty care ==
The institute provides 80,000 dialyses each year. In addition to traditional hemodialysis, The Rogosin Institute offers patients a number of options, including peritoneal dialysis and home nocturnal hemodialysis. Dialysis centers are located in Manhattan, Brooklyn, and Queens.

The Rogosin Institute is a pioneer in the implementation of technologies that make kidney transplantation more accessible and successful, such as programs for highly sensitized transplant recipients, the use of steroid-free protocols, desensitizing programs for incompatible donors, and donor exchange programs. The institute has completed more than 3,000 successful transplants.

The Rogosin Institute Comprehensive Lipid Control Center is a research and treatment center for adults and children with cholesterol and triglyceride disorders that provides a full range of diagnostic and individualized treatment plans. The institute pioneered clinical research of LDL apheresis in the early 1980s, which led to the adoption of the procedure to treat patients with the genetic form of extremely high cholesterol.

Physicians at the institute treat hypertension in patients with hypertension alone and in those with both hypertension and kidney disease.

== Research ==
Investigators at the institute are involved in early clinical testing of possible treatments for cancer and diabetes. The cancer research is based on the principle that all living cells have some built-in control of their growth and development. The research involves using encapsulated cancer cells that release substances that signal cancer cells to slow or stop their growth. Responses in tumors and improved quality of life for patients have been observed and additional studies are underway.

Diabetes research at The Rogosin Institute was stimulated by the fact that diabetes is the largest cause of end-stage kidney disease. Research began in 1987 on a process that replaces cells that produce insulin in the body (beta cells in the islets of the pancreas) in order to reverse insulin-dependent diabetes. The research involves a unique encapsulation of islet cells and early testing is underway.

Scientists at the Rogosin Institute have developed non-invasive procedures, less expensive and less painful than renal biopsies, for diagnosing rejection of transplanted kidneys.
