= Daphna Renan =

American legal scholar

Daphna Renan is an American legal scholar. She is the Peter B. Munroe and Mary J. Munroe Professor of Law at Harvard Law School. Renan is co-author, with Nikolas Bowie, of the 2026 book Supremacy.

== Education ==
Renan earned a Bachelor of Arts in East Asian studies from Yale College in 2000, an Master of Arts in International and Comparative Legal Studies from the University of London, School of Oriental and African Studies in 2001 and a Juris Doctor at Yale Law School in 2004.

== Career ==
Renan successively clerked for Harry T. Edwards and Ruth Bader Ginsburg, then worked for the United States Department of Justice from 2009 to 2012, first as counsel to the deputy attorney general and then as an attorney advisor in the Office of Legal Counsel. Renan specializes in administrative and constitutional law. In 2015, Renan joined the Harvard Law School faculty as an assistant professor. Renan has held the Peter B. Munroe and Mary J. Munroe Professorship of Law since 2023.
