= Supremacy: How Rule by the Court Replaced Government by the People =

Nonfiction book about Judicial Branch

- Author: Nikolas Bowie and Daphna Renan
- Language: English
- Subject: Judicial Branch
- Genre: Non-fiction
- Publisher: W. W. Norton & Company
- Publication date: September 15, 2026
- Publication place: United States
- Pages: 320
- ISBN: 978-1-324-09280-3

Supremacy: How Rule by the Court Replaced Government by the People is a 2026 book by Nikolas Bowie and Daphna Renan. Supremacy reviews two and a half centuries of history to argue that the power of judicial supremacy was not granted to the Supreme Court by the constitution but instead was seized. The book describes how white supremacists embraced it as one of the most potent tools to attempt to prevent a multiracial democracy after the reconstruction. Bowie and Renan argue for democratic constitutionalism and restoring Congress's role in defining American rights. Supremacy received favorable reviews.

== Development ==
Renan stated in an interview at Harvard Law School she and Bowie first discussed the book’s development in 2019. Bowie published some of these ideas in his 2021 Washington Post Perspective, "How the Supreme Court Dominates Our Democracy."

Bowie and Renan together have published articles anticipating the book in 2022 for The Atlantic and in 2024 and 2026 for The New York Times.

These articles alert the public of recent decisions that contradict federal laws or statutes such as Trump v. United States which gave the President broad immunity from federal criminal laws and Louisiana v. Callais which undid parts of the Voting Rights Act. Bowie and Renan urgently call Congress to action to return to its history of regulating the court to protect democracy such as with the No Kings Act.

== Themes ==
The Constitution’s Supremacy Clause states that the Constitution and the U.S. federal laws in pursuit of the Constitution “shall be the supreme Law of the Land” including over state laws when they conflict. The Constitution does not actually grant the Supreme Court the right to invalidate federal statutes it deems unconstitutional. Bowie and Renan define horizontal review as this power, which they also define as judicial supremacy.

Supremacy argues that the court should be able to perform vertical review to allow the Supreme Court to invalidate state and local laws and executive actions, that in the Justices' view, contradict federal statutes or the Constitution. The authors state that in fact the final power to interpret the Constitution is bestowed by the delegates only onto the people and their elected officials in Congress.

Judicial supremacy is described as an undemocratic power the Supreme Court has seized over time to weaken the ability the American people have to govern themselves through their elected officials. Supreme Court decisions promoting democratic values such as Brown v. Board of Education, Trump v. Barbara or USPS v. California resulted from enforcing federal statutes in vertical review, not striking them down in horizontal review.

When using judicial supremacy to defy federal statutes, the court refocused power away from the people toward corporations and wealthy individuals, for example by reducing protections for workers and restrictions on campaign financing. It rolled back waves of civil rights legislation that many fought and died for leading to Jim Crow. It expanded the power of the President to disregard Congress in order to start illegal wars abroad in Immigration and Naturalization Service v. Chadha and fire watchdogs Congress installed to check him in Trump v. Slaughter.

Democratic constitutionalism refers to an understanding of Congress as the supreme interpreter of the Constitution through federal statutes. This view contrasts with the misconception many Americans have of the Supreme Court as the final arbiter of the Constitution over Congress. Rather, the Supreme Court’s role was intended to be to uphold federal legislation passed by elected members of Congress.

The Constitution’s Exceptions Clause states that the Supreme Court is subject to “Exceptions” and “Regulations” prescribed by Congress while the Necessary and Proper Clause provides Congress the power to make laws to enact the Constitution. Many civil rights amendments end in the same final sentence: “Congress shall have power to enforce this article by appropriate legislation.”

Bowie and Renan describe the history of Congress’s regulation of the court and, when necessary, the President. They argue this regulation is necessary to protect Congress’s ability to enact legislation on behalf of the American people and is fundamental to democracy itself.

== Reception ==
In a review for The New Yorker, Daniel Immerwahr described Supremacy as "formidable, sharply argued." In Mother Jones, Pema Levy writes, “A new book from two legal scholars argues that the country was never supposed to be run by judges sitting on high, and it doesn’t have to be.” The Next Big Idea Club, which is curated by the academics Malcolm Gladwell, Susan Cain, Adam Grant, and Daniel H. Pink, selected Supremacy as one of its September 2026 Must-Read Books in Politics.
