= Robert Boehm =

American political activist (1914 - 2006)

Robert Boehm (1914 – December 26, 2006) was an American political activist. Boehm was a 1935 graduate of Dartmouth College and a 1939 graduate of Columbia University Law School. The son of an attorney, he married his father's secretary, Frances Rozran; Frances Boehm died on February 14, 2006. Boehm committed himself to a lifetime of social activism, including co-establishing, with Maurice Paprin, the Fund for New Priorities in America, as well as serving as the chairman of the board for the Center for Constitutional Rights, founded in 1966. A supporter of civil rights, an opponent of the Vietnam War, and, late in life, a critic of the US detainee camp at Guantanamo Bay after 2001, Boehm nonetheless distanced himself from leftists he felt were too extreme.
