= Woodcutters of the Deep South =

1973 film by Lionel Rogosin

- Directed by: Lionel Rogosin
- Produced by: Lionel Rogosin
- Narrated by: Lionel Rogosin (uncredited)
- Cinematography: Lionel Rogosin; Louis Brigante
- Edited by: Louis Brigante
- Release date: 1973
- Running time: 84 minutes
- Country: United States
- Language: English

Woodcutters of the Deep South is a 1973 American documentary film produced and directed by American independent filmmaker Lionel Rogosin. It was his sixth and final feature-length film.

== Plot ==
The film examines woodcutters working in Mississippi and Alabama. It follows Black and white woodcutters who are forced to look past racial differences to fight exploitation from paper and pulpwood corporations. These workers unite to form the Gulf Coast Pulpwood Association in an effort to protect their livelihoods.

== See also ==
- List of American films of 1973
