= Henry Herx =

American film critic

- Born: June 29, 1933; Chicago
- Died: August 15, 2012 (aged 79); Ramsey, New Jersey

Henry Herx (June 29, 1933 – August 15, 2012) was an American film critic who specialized in creating brief capsule reviews intended for Roman Catholic moviegoers. During his 35-year career, Herx reviewed thousands of films for the Media Review Office of the Catholic News Service.

== Biography ==
Herx was born in Chicago on June 29, 1933, and graduated from Loyola University Chicago, where he earned undergraduate and graduate degrees in history. In contrast to the National Legion of Decency's model of "the purification of the cinema" in which films deemed to be offensive to Roman Catholics were listed so that they could be avoided, Herx began his film reviewing effort on 1962 together with Rev. Ronald Holloway, when they created the Chicago Center for Film Study as a way to look at films from a perspective that engaged cinema. Herx worked for the Catholic News Service's Media Review Office, which is a successor to the National Legion of Decency and then the National Catholic Office for Motion Pictures, and would become the United States Conference of Catholic Bishops' Office for Film and Broadcasting after Herx retired. He began working for the Media Review Office in 1964, reviewing more than 10,000 films during his career, and retired as the organization's chief critic in 1999, watching many of the movies together with his family at their home. In addition to a capsule review, Herx gave films a rating of A for films that were deemed morally unobjectionable that ranged from A-I (for general audiences) through A-IV (for adults, but with reservations), with films deemed morally offensive being given a rating of "O". The Full Monty, the 1997 film about unemployed men who turn to a striptease act to make money, earned an A-IV rating that reflected its positive message of overcoming obstacles. In reviewing a number of films in the mid-1990s, Herx gave Clueless a rating of "O" despite the film's PG-13 rating from the Motion Picture Association of America, while the film Priest was given an A-IV rating, despite controversy about the movie's dealings with the homosexuality of a young priest and his crisis of faith.

Herx was proud of the fact that he would watch each movie in its entirety regardless of content and was deeply bothered when he was told that reviewers Roger Ebert and Gene Siskel had walked out on a film. Herx's son noted that "he felt his job was to sit there and watch it and give an honest review" no matter how bad it was. His Our Sunday Visitor's Family Guide to Movies and Videos provided an overview of films based on their content and their conformance to Roman Catholic teachings.

Herx died on August 15, 2012, at the age of 79 in his Ramsey, New Jersey, home of complications of liver cancer.
