= Black Roots (film) =

1970 film

- Directed by: Lionel Rogosin
- Produced by: Lionel Rogosin
- Starring: Jim Collier, Rev. Gary Davis, Larry Johnson, Flo Kennedy, Rev. Frederick Douglas Kirkpatrick, Wendy Smith
- Cinematography: J. Robert Wagner
- Edited by: Ruth Schell
- Release date: 1970
- Running time: 60 minutes
- Country: United States
- Language: English

Black Roots is a film produced and directed by American independent filmmaker Lionel Rogosin. The film gathers a number of African-American folk and blues musicians in a room, where they share stories and songs about the black experience in America. Film editor Carl Lerner is credited as an "associate producer"; and Alan Lomax, along with his daughter Anna, are credited as "musical consultants." Anna Lomax also has the credit of "assistant editor."

Lionel Rogosin reunited with Jim Collier two years later for Black Fantasy.

== Reception ==
Blu-ray.com said the film, "is very much a film of its time, both in cinematic style and in subject matter. With today's technology, a budding filmmaker could do far more logistically on Rogosin's limited budget, but few would have Rogosin's eye or his ability to get people to speak openly. Besides, Rogosin captured a socio-psychological landscape that has changed dramatically, just as New York's Bowery has evolved since the filmmaker spent weeks in its back alleys making friends with the regulars. Black Roots captures an essential perspective on America at the height of the civil rights movement. For that alone, it is worth seeing."
