= Ramsey, New Jersey =

Borough in Bergen County, New Jersey, US

- Borough
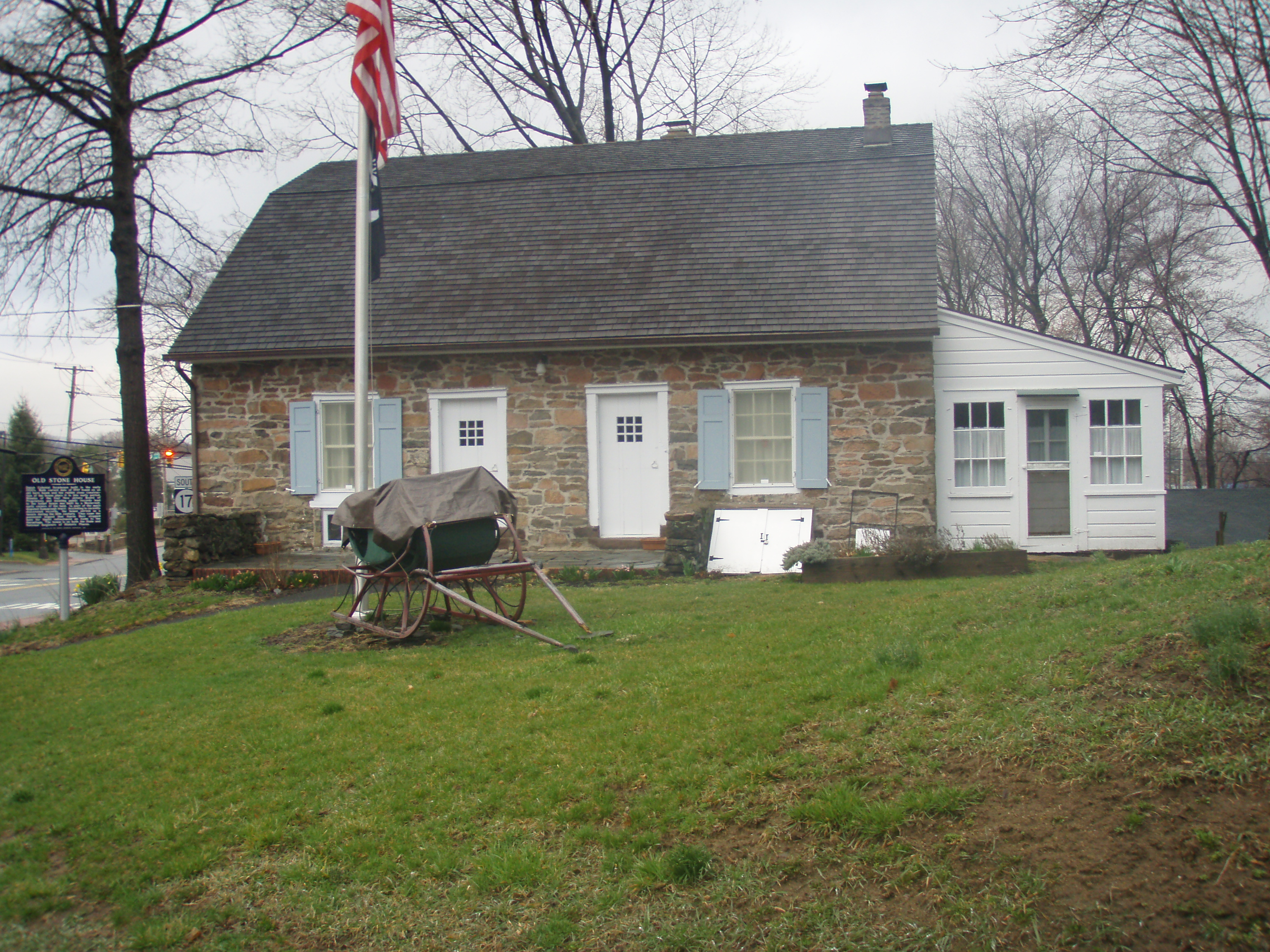
- The historic Old Stone House in Ramsey

- Seal

- Location of Ramsey in Bergen County highlighted in red (left). Inset map: Location of Bergen County in New Jersey highlighted in orange (right).

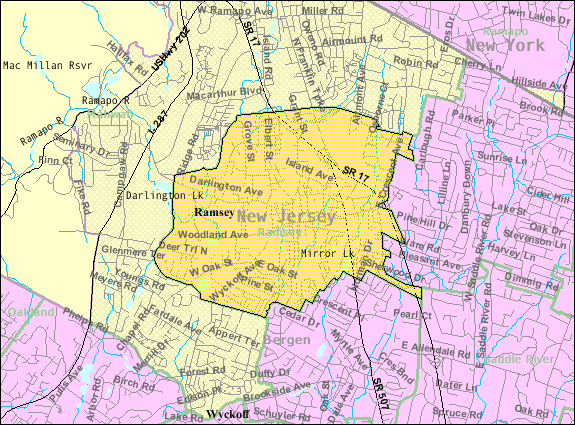
- Census Bureau map of Ramsey, New Jersey

- Location in Bergen County Location in New Jersey Location in the United States
- Coordinates: 41.061325°N 74.146996°W
- Country: United States
- State: New Jersey
- County: Bergen
- Incorporated: March 10, 1908
- Named for: Peter J. Ramsey

Government
  - Type: Borough
  - Body: Borough Council
  - Mayor: Deirdre A. Dillon (R, term ends December 31, 2026)
  - Administrator: Bruce Vozeh
  - Municipal clerk: Meredith Bendian

Area
  - Total: 5.57 sq mi (14.43 km^{2})
  - Land: 5.50 sq mi (14.25 km^{2})
  - Water: 0.069 sq mi (0.18 km^{2}) 1.24%
  - Rank: 266th of 565 in state 9th of 70 in county
- Elevation: 351 ft (107 m)

Population (2020)
  - Total: 14,798
  - Estimate (2023): 14,706
  - Rank: 178th of 565 in state 23rd of 70 in county
  - Density: 2,689.1/sq mi (1,038.3/km^{2})
  - Rank: 241st of 565 in state 47th of 70 in county
- Time zone: UTC−05:00 (Eastern (EST))
  - Summer (DST): UTC−04:00 (Eastern (EDT))
- ZIP Code: 07446
- Area code: 201
- FIPS code: 3400361680
- GNIS feature ID: 0885364
- Website: www.ramseynj.com

Ramsey is a borough in Bergen County, in the U.S. state of New Jersey. It is a suburb of New York City, located 26 miles (42 km) northwest of Midtown Manhattan. As of the 2020 United States census, the borough's population was 14,798, an increase of 325 (+2.2%) from the 2010 census count of 14,473, which in turn reflected an increase of 122 (+0.9%) from the 14,351 counted in the 2000 census.

Ramsey was incorporated as a borough by an act of the New Jersey Legislature on March 10, 1908, from portions of Hohokus Township (whose remnants are now Mahwah Township). Additional territory was annexed from Waldwick in 1921, and portions of the borough were ceded to Saddle River in 1925.

== History ==
Before European settlement, the area that became Ramsey was occupied by the Lenape Native Americans in the United States.

The most noteworthy local historical site is the Old Stone House, which is, as its name describes, both old and constructed of stone, though its construction materials in the early 1700s also included hog's hair. It was originally a Dutch farmhouse and served as a tavern during the Revolutionary War. Legend has it that Aaron Burr slaked his thirst at this site, on his way to courting the woman who would become his wife in Ho-Ho-Kus. The structure opened as a historic site in 1960 with a display of antique pitchers.

Ramsey is named after Peter J. Ramsey, a 19th-century landowner who died c. 1854, who had sold the land that in 1848 became the site of a railroad station called "Ramsey's Station".

== Geography ==
According to the United States Census Bureau, the borough had a total area of 5.57 square miles (14.43 km^{2}), including 5.50 square miles (14.25 km^{2}) of land and 0.07 square miles (0.18 km^{2}) of water (1.24%).

The borough is bordered by the Bergen County municipalities of Allendale on the southeast, Mahwah on the north, west, and southwest and by Saddle River and Upper Saddle River on the east.

== Demographics ==
Historical population
Census	Pop.	Note	%±
1900	1,074		—
1910	1,667		55.2%
1920	2,090		25.4%
1930	3,258		55.9%
1940	3,566		9.5%
1950	4,670		31.0%
1960	9,527		104.0%
1970	12,571		32.0%
1980	12,899		2.6%
1990	13,228		2.6%
2000	14,351		8.5%
2010	14,473		0.9%
2020	14,798		2.2%
2023 (est.)	14,706	▼	−0.6%
Population sources: 1910–1920 1910; 1910–1930 1900–2020; 2000 2010 2020

=== Racial and ethnic composition ===
Ramsey borough, New Jersey – Racial and ethnic composition Note: the US Census treats Hispanic/Latino as an ethnic category. This table excludes Latinos from the racial categories and assigns them to a separate category. Hispanics/Latinos may be of any race.
Race / Ethnicity (NH = Non-Hispanic)	Pop 2000	Pop 2010	Pop 2020	% 2000	% 2010	% 2020
White alone (NH)	12,846	12,391	11,711	89.51%	85.61%	79.14%
Black or African American alone (NH)	110	90	127	0.77%	0.62%	0.86%
Native American or Alaska Native alone (NH)	10	9	4	0.07%	0.06%	0.03%
Asian alone (NH)	833	959	1,134	5.80%	6.63%	7.66%
Native Hawaiian or Pacific Islander alone (NH)	1	0	1	0.01%	0.00%	0.01%
Other race alone (NH)	6	19	64	0.04%	0.13%	0.43%
Mixed race or Multiracial (NH)	125	139	383	0.87%	0.96%	2.59%
Hispanic or Latino (any race)	420	866	1,374	2.93%	5.98%	9.29%
Total	14,351	14,473	14,798	100.00%	100.00%	100.00%

=== 2020 census ===
As of the 2020 census, the borough had a population of 14,798. The median age was 44.3 years. 22.8% of residents were under the age of 18 and 17.6% were 65 years of age or older. For every 100 females, there were 94.6 males, and for every 100 females age 18 and older there were 92.0 males.

100.0% of residents lived in urban areas, while 0.0% lived in rural areas.

There were 5,488 households, of which 33.6% had children under the age of 18 living in them. Of all households, 61.1% were married-couple households, 12.2% were households with a male householder and no spouse or partner present, and 22.9% were households with a female householder and no spouse or partner present. About 22.4% of all households were made up of individuals, and 11.3% had someone living alone who was 65 years of age or older.

There were 5,670 housing units, of which 3.2% were vacant. The homeowner vacancy rate was 1.0% and the rental vacancy rate was 2.8%.

=== 2010 census ===
The 2010 United States census counted 14,473 people, 5,363 households, and 3,926 families in the borough. The population density was 2,621.9 per square mile (1,012.3/km^{2}). There were 5,550 housing units at an average density of 1,005.4 per square mile (388.2/km^{2}). The racial makeup was 89.45% (12,946) White, 0.65% (94) Black or African American, 0.12% (17) Native American, 6.66% (964) Asian, 0.00% (0) Pacific Islander, 1.89% (274) from other races, and 1.23% (178) from two or more races. Hispanic or Latino of any race were 5.98% (866) of the population.

Of the 5,363 households, 36.8% had children under the age of 18; 62.2% were married couples living together; 8.1% had a female householder with no husband present and 26.8% were non-families. Of all households, 23.4% were made up of individuals and 9.2% had someone living alone who was 65 years of age or older. The average household size was 2.69 and the average family size was 3.21.

26.6% of the population were under the age of 18, 6.0% from 18 to 24, 23.1% from 25 to 44, 31.7% from 45 to 64, and 12.7% who were 65 years of age or older. The median age was 42.0 years. For every 100 females, the population had 94.7 males. For every 100 females ages 18 and older there were 90.8 males.

The Census Bureau's 2006–2010 American Community Survey showed that (in 2010 inflation-adjusted dollars) median household income was $111,549 (with a margin of error of +/− $8,131) and the median family income was $136,475 (+/− $2,642). Males had a median income of $90,326 (+/− $5,483) versus $63,234 (+/− $6,177) for females. The per capita income for the borough was $52,491 (+/− $36,084). About 1.9% of families and 3.8% of the population were below the poverty line, including 4.4% of those under age 18 and 9.8% of those age 65 or over.

Same-sex couples headed 20 households in 2010, unchanged from 2000.

=== 2000 census ===
As of the 2000 United States census there were 14,351 people, 5,313 households, and 3,947 families residing in the borough. The population density was 2,583.2 inhabitants per square mile (997.4/km^{2}). There were 5,400 housing units at an average density of 972.0 per square mile (375.3/km^{2}). The racial makeup of the borough was 91.62% White, 0.78% African American, 0.10% Native American, 5.85% Asian, 0.01% Pacific Islander, 0.54% from other races, and 1.10% from two or more races. Hispanic or Latino of any race were 2.93% of the population.

There were 5,313 households, out of which 37.7% had children under the age of 18 living with them, 64.4% were married couples living together, 7.4% had a female householder with no husband present, and 25.7% were non-families. 22.6% of all households were made up of individuals, and 7.8% had someone living alone who was 65 years of age or older. The average household size was 2.68 and the average family size was 3.18.

In the borough, the age distribution of the population shows 27.0% under the age of 18, 4.9% from 18 to 24, 30.5% from 25 to 44, 26.3% from 45 to 64, and 11.2% who were 65 years of age or older. The median age was 39 years. For every 100 females, there were 93.3 males. For every 100 females age 18 and over, there were 88.9 males.

The median income for a household in the borough was $88,187, and the median income for a family was $104,512. Males had a median income of $75,017 versus $43,205 for females. The per capita income for the borough was $41,964. About 1.4% of families and 1.9% of the population were below the poverty line, including 2.2% of those under age 18 and 2.5% of those age 65 or over.

== Economy ==
The Ramsey Farmers Market includes vendors offering locally sourced produce, foods, beverages and flowers at the Ramsey NJ Transit Station on Main Street every Sunday throughout the year.

Corporate residents of Ramsey have included:

- Flight Centre, parent company of Liberty Travel and GOGO Worldwide Vacations, was located at 69 Spring Street. The company announced in February 2016 that they were relocating to Montvale.
- Konica Minolta's U.S. offices are in Ramsey.
- Okonite, based in Ramsey.

The most common industries for females in Ramsey, according to City-data.com, from 2008 to 2012:

- Health care and social assistance (22%)
- Educational services (16%)
- Finance and insurance (11%)
- Manufacturing (10%)
- Professional, scientific, and technical services (8%)
- Retail trade (8%)
- Other services, except public administration (5%)

The most common industries for males in Ramsey, according to City-Data.com, from 2008 to 2012:

- Finance and insurance (17%)
- Manufacturing (13%)
- Professional, scientific, and technical services (10%)
- Construction (9%)
- Retail trade (8%)
- Wholesale trade (7%)
- Educational services (7%)

== Arts and culture ==
Ramsey had an old-style downtown cinema with two screens. It closed in 2013, but reopened in 2014 after a successful Kickstarter campaign raised the funds needed for updated projection systems. However, it closed for good in 2020 due to hardships from the COVID-19 pandemic.

Ramsey has six houses of worship. These include: First Presbyterian Church, Lutheran Church of the Redeemer, St. Paul's Roman Catholic Church, St. Paul's Ukrainian Catholic Church, St. John's Episcopal Church, and Grace Baptist Church.

== Parks and recreation ==
Ramsey has about 153 acres (62 ha) of land under Green Acres protection by the New Jersey Department of Environmental Protection, which is land that is permanently preserved as open space in the borough. This is one of the reasons that the borough, while about 98.5% developed, has retained a "rural ambience".

Established in 1995, Ramsey Golf and Country Club has an 18-hole golf course, in addition to a restaurant, swimming pool, picnic area, playground, tennis courts and a banquet room.

Finch Park, located on Church Street, Gertzen Plaza, and Island Avenue, has a playground, picnic areas, eight baseball and softball fields, a street hockey rink, and basketball courts. There is a memorial for the attacks on September 11, 2001, with its own parking area located on Gertzen Plaza. The park is headquarters of the Ramsey Recreation Commission, and home fields of the Ramsey Baseball and Softball Association. In the summer months, the Rec Commission has a summer camp in Finch Park for Ramsey students in kindergarten to 7th grade.

The Ramsey Municipal Pool, located on East Oak Street, has a newly renovated pool and waterslides, a recreational field and pavilion, and beach volleyball and basketball courts.

Behind Ramsey High School, there are five tennis courts and a running track that are open to public use. The RHS football field and the newly built Creamer Field are two of the four fields with night lighting in Ramsey; the other two are located at the MacFarran Field complex on Williams Drive, overlooking Route 17.

Behind Tisdale Elementary School, there are two softball fields that are open to the community.

Suraci Pond, located on Woodland Avenue, is a small lake with areas to fish, picnic benches, and hiking trails. A similar recreational area exists at Garrison Pond on Lake Street. An Eagle Scout Project from Ramsey's Troop 31 installed picnic tables and restored the flower bed.

== Government ==
=== Local government ===
Ramsey is governed under the borough form of New Jersey municipal government, which is used in 218 municipalities (of the 564) statewide, making it the most common form of government in New Jersey. The governing body is composed of a mayor and a borough council, with all positions elected at-large on a partisan basis as part of the November general election. A mayor is elected directly by the voters to a four-year term of office. The borough council includes six members elected to serve three-year terms on a staggered basis, with two seats coming up for election each year in a three-year cycle. The borough form of government used in Ramsey is a "weak mayor / strong council" government in which council members act as the legislative body with the mayor presiding at meetings and voting only in the event of a tie. The mayor can veto ordinances subject to an override by a two-thirds majority vote of the council. The mayor makes committee and liaison assignments for council members, and most appointments are made by the mayor with the advice and consent of the council.

As of 2023, the Mayor of the Borough of Ramsey is Republican Deirdre A. Dillon, whose term of office ends December 31, 2026. Members of the Ramsey Borough Council are Council President Peter Kilman (R, 2024), Judith Cusick (R, 2023), Michael W. Gutwetter (R, 2023), Glen J. Popolo (R, 2025), Sara Poppe (R, 2024) and Jane M. Woods (R, 2025).

In January 2015, the borough council selected Peter Kilman from a list of three candidates nominated by the Republican municipal committee to fill the seat expiring in 2015 that held by Deirdre A. Dillon vacant since she was sworn in as mayor that month. In November 2015, Kilman was elected to serve a full three-year term.

Joseph Verdone was chosen in August 2012 to fill the vacant seat expiring in December 2014 of Bruce Vozeh following his resignation the previous month to become the municipal administrator.

=== Federal, state, and county representation ===
Ramsey is located in the 5th Congressional District and is part of New Jersey's 39th state legislative district.

For the 119th United States Congress, New Jersey's 5th congressional district is represented by Josh Gottheimer (D, Wyckoff). New Jersey is represented in the United States Senate by Democrats Cory Booker (Newark, term ends 2027) and Andy Kim (Moorestown, term ends 2031).

For the 2026–2027 session, the 39th legislative district of the New Jersey Legislature is represented in the State Senate by Holly Schepisi (R, River Vale) and in the General Assembly by Robert Auth (R, Old Tappan) and John V. Azzariti (R, Saddle River).

Bergen County is governed by a directly elected County Executive, with legislative functions performed by a Board of County Commissioners comprised of seven members who are elected at-large to three-year terms in partisan elections on a staggered basis, with either two or three seats coming up for election each November; a Chairman and Vice Chairman are selected from among its seven members at a reorganization meeting held every January. As of 2025, the county executive is James J. Tedesco III (D, Paramus), whose four-year term of office ends December 31, 2026.

Bergen County's Commissioners are Chair Mary J. Amoroso (D, Mahwah, 2025), Vice Chair Steven A. Tanelli (D, North Arlington, 2027), Chair Pro Tem Joan Voss (D, Fort Lee, 2026), Rafael Marte (D, Bergenfield, 2026), Germaine M. Ortiz (D, Emerson, 2025), Thomas J. Sullivan Jr. (D, Montvale, 2025) and Tracy Silna Zur (D, Franklin Lakes, 2027).

Bergen County's elected constitutional officials are Clerk John S. Hogan (D, Northvale, 2026), Sheriff Anthony Cureton (D, Englewood, 2027) and Surrogate Michael R. Dressler (D, Cresskill, 2026).

=== Politics ===
United States presidential election results for Ramsey 2024 2020 2016 2012 2008 2004
Year	Republican		Democratic		Third party(ies)	
Year	No.	%	No.	%	No.	%
2024	4,433	49.23%	4,408	48.95%	164	1.82%
2020	4,343	44.97%	5,169	53.53%	145	1.50%
2016	4,132	49.84%	3,872	46.71%	286	3.45%
2012	4,333	57.30%	3,167	41.88%	62	0.82%
2008	4,417	54.99%	3,556	44.27%	59	0.73%
2004	4,606	58.56%	3,207	40.78%	52	0.66%

As of March 2011, there were a total of 9,705 registered voters in Ramsey, of which 2,133 (22.0% vs. 31.7% countywide) were registered as Democrats, 2,712 (27.9% vs. 21.1%) were registered as Republicans and 4,849 (50.0% vs. 47.1%) were registered as Unaffiliated. There were 11 voters registered as Libertarians or Greens. Among the borough's 2010 Census population, 67.1% (vs. 57.1% in Bergen County) were registered to vote, including 91.3% of those ages 18 and over (vs. 73.7% countywide).

In the 2016 presidential election, Republican Donald Trump received 4,132 votes (49.3% vs. 41.1% countywide), ahead of Democrat Hillary Clinton with 3,872 votes (46.2% vs. 54.2%) and other candidates with 373 votes (4.5% vs. 4.6%), among the 8,426 ballots cast by the borough's 11,000 registered voters, for a turnout of 76.6% (vs. 72.5% in Bergen County). In the 2012 presidential election, Republican Mitt Romney received 4,333 votes (57.0% vs. 43.5% countywide), ahead of Democrat Barack Obama with 3,167 votes (41.7% vs. 54.8%) and other candidates with 62 votes (0.8% vs. 0.9%), among the 7,598 ballots cast by the borough's 10,342 registered voters, for a turnout of 73.5% (vs. 70.4% in Bergen County). In the 2008 presidential election, Republican John McCain received 4,417 votes (54.7% vs. 44.5% countywide), ahead of Democrat Barack Obama with 3,556 votes (44.0% vs. 53.9%) and other candidates with 59 votes (0.7% vs. 0.8%), among the 8,076 ballots cast by the borough's 10,046 registered voters, for a turnout of 80.4% (vs. 76.8% in Bergen County). In the 2004 presidential election, Republican George W. Bush received 4,606 votes (58.4% vs. 47.2% countywide), ahead of Democrat John Kerry with 3,207 votes (40.7% vs. 51.7%) and other candidates with 52 votes (0.7% vs. 0.7%), among the 7,886 ballots cast by the borough's 9,754 registered voters, for a turnout of 80.8% (vs. 76.9% in the whole county).

Gubernatorial election results for Ramsey
Year	Republican		Democratic		Third party(ies)	
Year	No.	%	No.	%	No.	%
2025	3,521	49.61%	3,564	50.21%	13	0.18%
2021	3,255	53.86%	2,765	45.75%	24	0.40%
2017	2,498	52.83%	2,161	45.71%	69	1.46%
2013	3,162	69.86%	1,316	29.08%	48	1.06%
2009	2,945	56.02%	1,945	37.00%	367	6.98%
2005	2,815	55.21%	2,180	42.75%	104	2.04%

In the 2013 gubernatorial election, Republican Chris Christie received 69.9% of the vote (3,162 cast), ahead of Democrat Barbara Buono with 29.1% (1,316 votes), and other candidates with 1.1% (48 votes), among the 4,599 ballots cast by the borough's 9,948 registered voters (73 ballots were spoiled), for a turnout of 46.2%. In the 2009 gubernatorial election, Republican Chris Christie received 2,945 votes (55.8% vs. 45.8% countywide), ahead of Democrat Jon Corzine with 1,945 votes (36.8% vs. 48.0%), Independent Chris Daggett with 343 votes (6.5% vs. 4.7%) and other candidates with 24 votes (0.5% vs. 0.5%), among the 5,280 ballots cast by the borough's 9,866 registered voters, yielding a 53.5% turnout (vs. 50.0% in the county).

United States Senate election results for Ramsey1
Year	Republican		Democratic		Third party(ies)	
Year	No.	%	No.	%	No.	%
2024	4,355	50.33%	4,175	48.25%	123	1.42%
2018	3,372	54.73%	2,623	42.57%	166	2.69%
2012	3,970	56.54%	2,951	42.03%	100	1.42%
2006	3,330	59.67%	2,188	39.20%	63	1.13%

United States Senate election results for Ramsey2
Year	Republican		Democratic		Third party(ies)	
Year	No.	%	No.	%	No.	%
2020	4,488	47.23%	4,920	51.77%	95	1.00%
2014	2,629	54.57%	2,120	44.00%	69	1.43%
2013	1,632	52.78%	1,442	46.64%	18	0.58%
2008	4,229	56.54%	3,173	42.43%	77	1.03%

== Education ==
Ramsey has a highly educated population. Based on data from the American Community Survey, it was ranked as one of the top 15 most educated municipalities in New Jersey with a population of at least 10,000, placing No. 2 on the list. With 40.3% of residents having a bachelor's degree or higher, the borough was second only to Hoboken (with 50.2%).

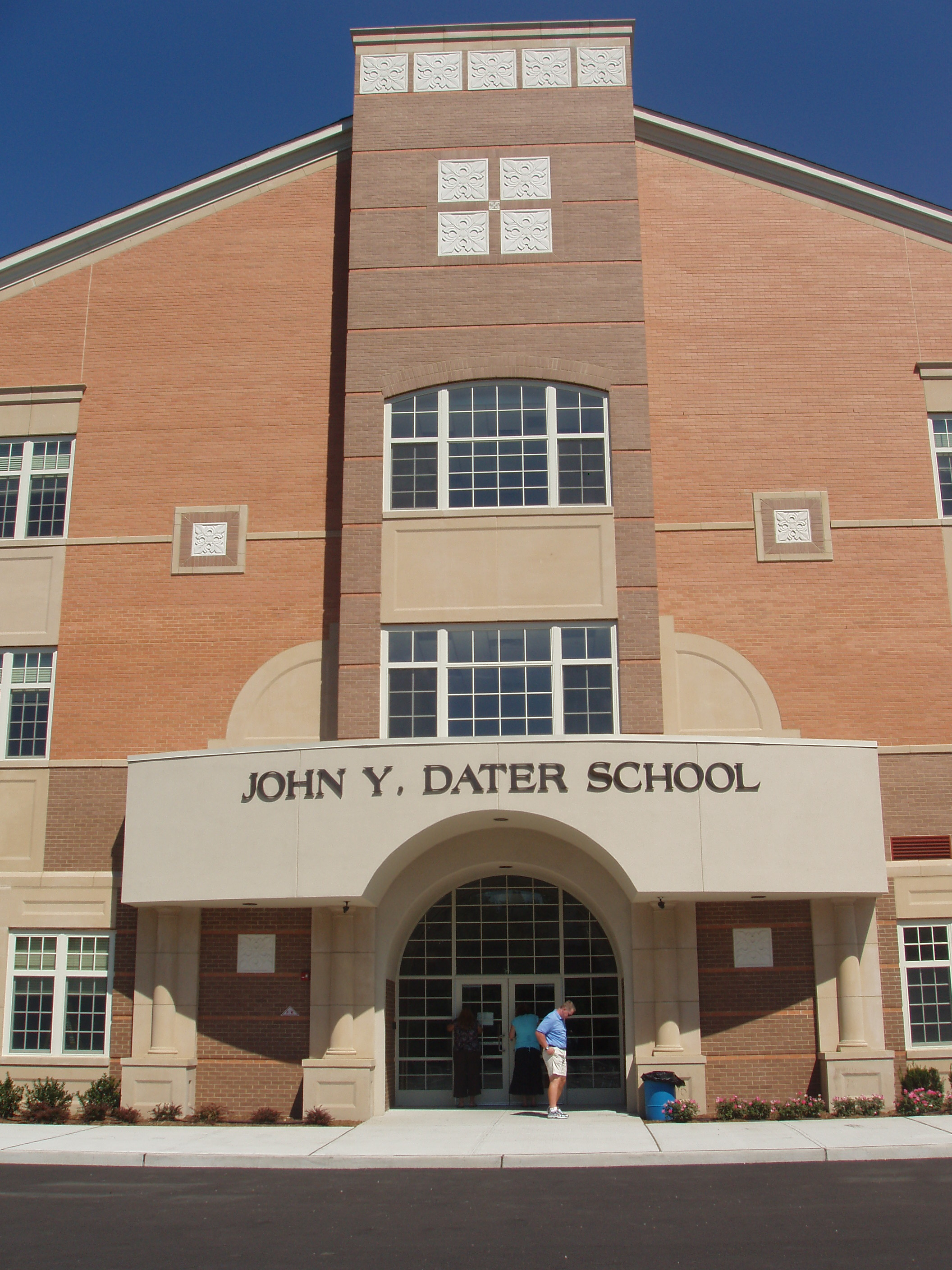
The new John Y. Dater Elementary School was built in 2006.

The Ramsey Public School District serves students in pre-kindergarten through twelfth grade. As of the 2023–24 school year, the district, comprised of five schools, had an enrollment of 2,418 students and 249.3 classroom teachers (on an FTE basis), for a student–teacher ratio of 9.7:1. Schools in the district (with 2023–24 enrollment data from the National Center for Education Statistics) are Mary A. Hubbard Elementary School with 345 students in grades PreK–3, Wesley D. Tisdale Elementary School with 320 students in grades PreK–3, John Y. Dater Elementary School with 322 students in grades 4–5, Eric S. Smith Middle School with 628 students in grades 6–8 and Ramsey High School with 773 students in grades 9–12.

Public school students from the borough, and all of Bergen County, are eligible to attend the secondary education programs offered by the Bergen County Technical Schools, which include the Bergen County Academies in Hackensack, and the Bergen Tech campus in Teterboro or Paramus. The district offers programs on a shared-time or full-time basis, with admission based on a selective application process and tuition covered by the student's home school district.

The Roman Catholic Archdiocese of Newark oversees the operation of the Academy of St. Paul, a K–8 school and Don Bosco Preparatory High School, an all-boys Roman Catholic high school for grades 9–12 founded in 1915 and overseen by the Salesians of Don Bosco. In 2015, the Academy of St. Paul was one of 15 schools in New Jersey, and one of six private schools, recognized as a National Blue Ribbon School in the exemplary high performing category by the United States Department of Education.

== Transportation ==
=== Roads and highways ===
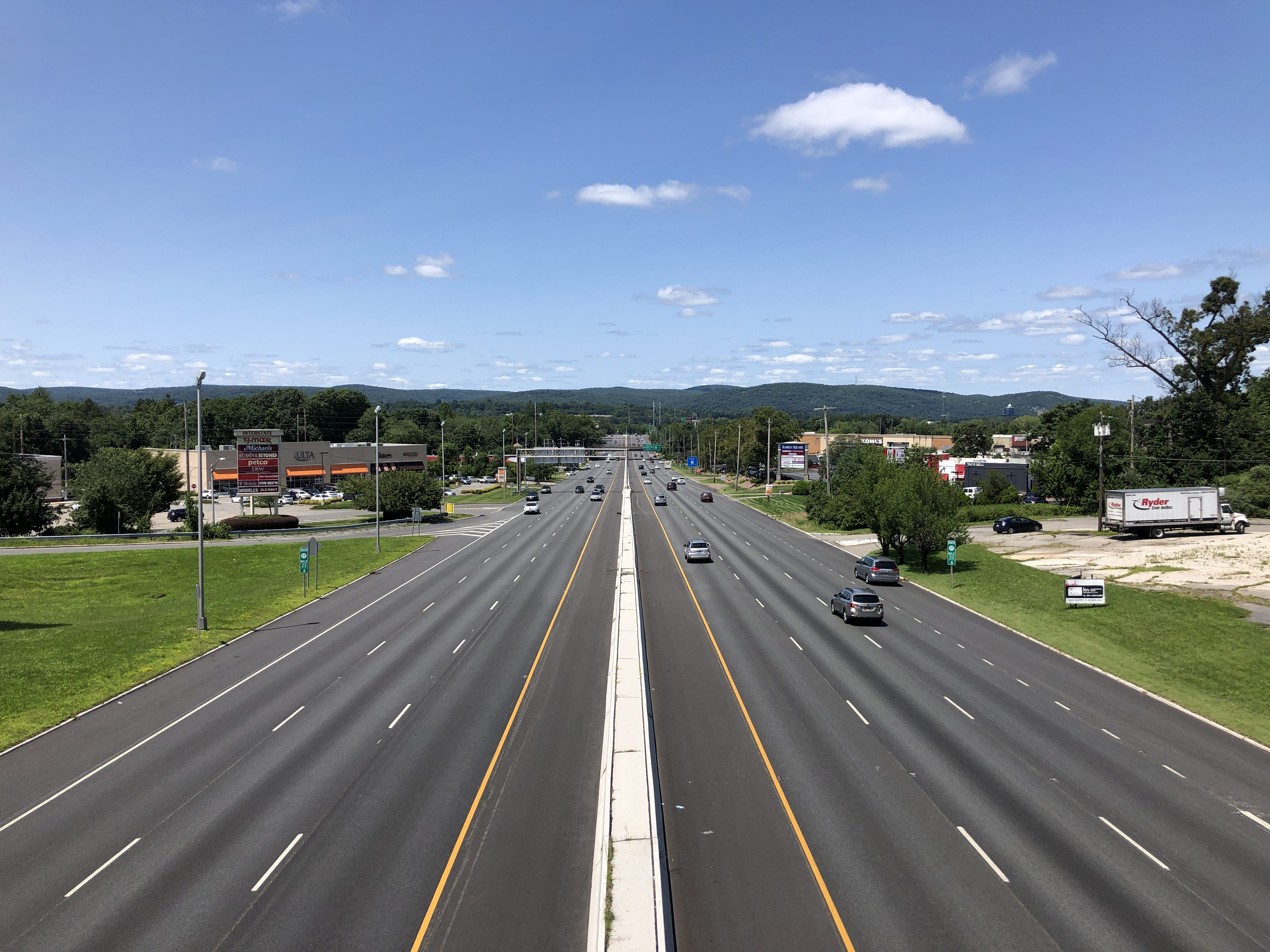
Route 17 northbound in Ramsey

As of May 2010, the borough had a total of 65.32 miles (105.12 km) of roadways, of which 51.82 miles (83.40 km) were maintained by the municipality, 11.45 miles (18.43 km) by Bergen County and 2.05 miles (3.30 km) by the New Jersey Department of Transportation.

A number of roadways serve Ramsey and its neighboring communities, providing the borough with easy driving access to New York State (including New York City) and other points within New Jersey. Route 17 and County Route 507 intersect the areas east and north of Ramsey's downtown business district, while Interstate 287 and U.S. Route 202 pass through the Darlington section of Mahwah to the west and the New York State Thruway (Interstate 87 / Interstate 287) and NY Route 59 run through Suffern, New York, to the north.

=== Public transportation ===
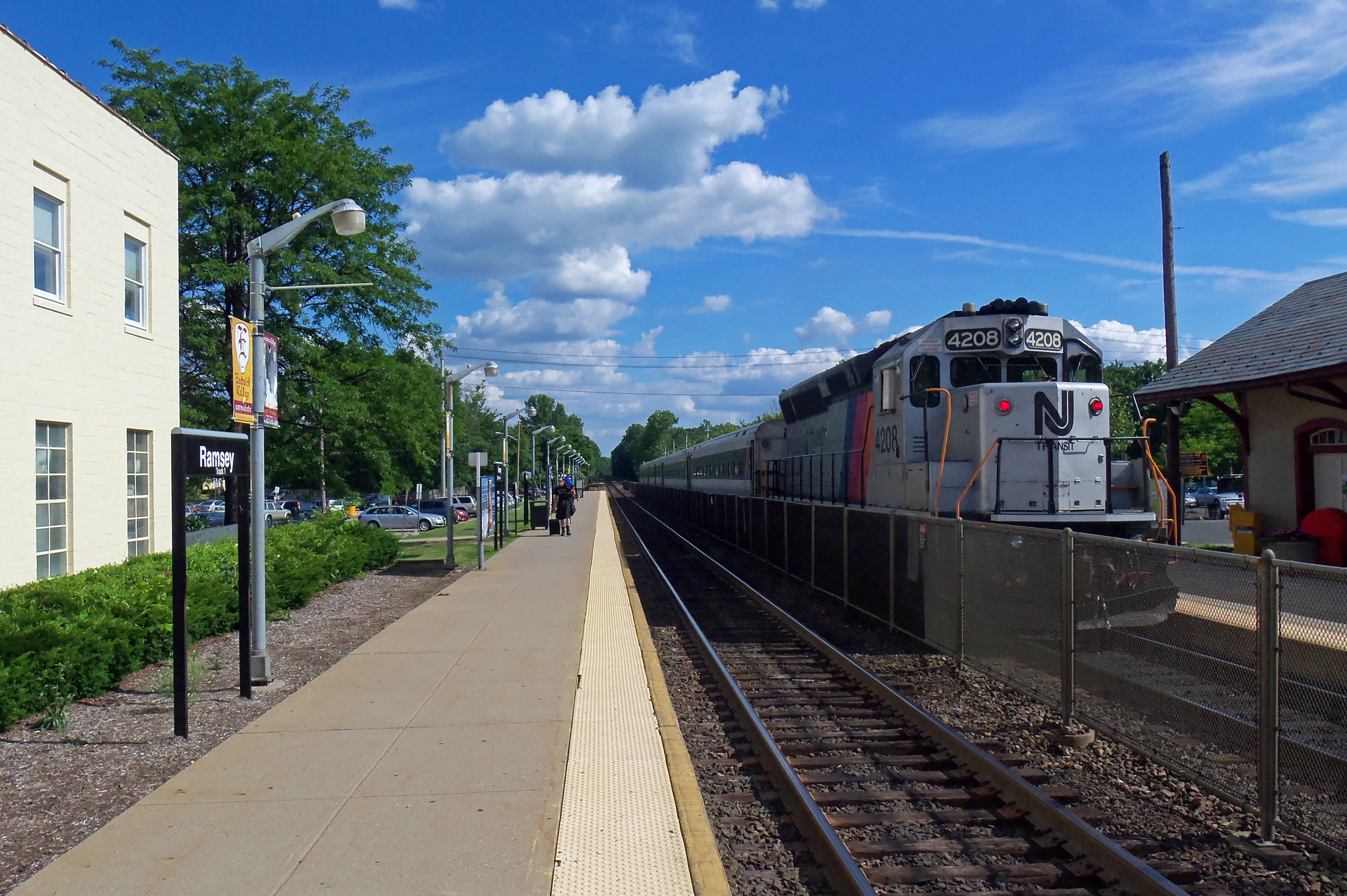
The older Ramsey NJ Transit Station, on Main Street, is the oldest operating passenger rail station in New Jersey and serves both Main Line and Bergen County Line trains.

Ramsey has two NJ Transit train stations which provide mass transit access to and from Hoboken Terminal with connections available at Secaucus Junction to Penn Station New York in Midtown Manhattan and other NJ Transit lines. Located on Main Street just east of Central Avenue in the borough's downtown area, the Ramsey Main Street station was constructed in 1868 by the Paterson and Ramapo Railroad and is the oldest operating passenger station in service in New Jersey. The Ramsey Route 17 station, which opened on August 22, 2004, is a park-and-ride facility and regional commuter hub located along Route 17 South in the northern section of town. Both of these stations are stops along NJ Transit's Main Line and Bergen County Line.

Short Line provides bus service along Route 17 (with limited service at other local stops) to the Port Authority Bus Terminal in Midtown Manhattan. Tickets can be easily found on the Couch Bus USA app.

== Popular culture ==
Films

- Some scenes from the movie World Trade Center (2006) were filmed in a house in Ramsey.

Television

- A segment of the very first episode of A Little Curious entitled, "Loud, Soft and Shake" features the Ramsey Fire Department rushing to a fire with the sirens blaring loudly to demonstrate the concept of loud to the viewers. While the segment was filmed at the fire station and the surrounding area, the truck used for the response was actually from the Saddle River fire department.
- A segment of Rescue 911, Season 1, episode 2 features two young residents from Ramsey who were saved from an oncoming freight train.
- Scenes from "The Happy Wanderer" episode of the HBO series The Sopranos were shot at the Maple Shade Motel, and scenes from the episode "Bust Out" were filmed at the Ramsey Outdoor store.

== Notable people ==
People who were born in, residents of, or otherwise closely associated with Ramsey include:

- Danny Aiello (1933–2019), stage and film star lived in Ramsey for many years during the 1980s and 1990s
- Adrienne Asch (1946–2013), blind bioethicist who was founding director of the Center for Ethics at Yeshiva University
- Tom Austin, drummer and lyricist for the 1950s / 1960s rock band The Royal Teens, best known for their one hit "Short Shorts"
- Shawn Batten (born 1971), actress who appeared in Spyder Games and Sunset Beach
- Chase Bisontis, American football offensive tackle for the Texas A&M Aggies
- Edd Cartier (1914–2008), pulp magazine illustrator
- Mike Dietze (born 1989), professional soccer player who played for the Philadelphia Fury of the American Soccer League
- Louise Eisenhardt (1891–1967), early neuropathologist who was the first woman to serve as president of the American Association of Neurological Surgeons
- Jeremiah Fraites (born 1986), co-founder and drummer of the musical group the Lumineers
- Thomas E. Franklin (born 1966), photographer for The Record, perhaps best known for his photograph Raising the Flag at Ground Zero
- Jonathan Halyalkar, child actor who played Billy on the 1980s sitcom Who's the Boss?
- Henry Herx (1933–2012), film critic whose reviews were intended for Catholic moviegoers
- Charles Ernest Hosking Jr. (1924–1967), United States Army Master Sergeant and Medal of Honor recipient; Hosking Way, a road off Darlington Avenue, is named in his honor
- Bridget Anne Kelly, former Deputy Chief of Staff to Governor of New Jersey Chris Christie
- Mike Laga (born 1960), former professional baseball player who is the only player to hit a foul ball completely out of Busch Memorial Stadium in St. Louis
- Maria LaRosa, on-camera meteorologist for The Weather Channel
- Bob McAdoo (born 1951), former New York Knicks player lived in Ramsey during the 1970s/1980s/1990s
- Ryan McGinley (born 1977), photographer named Photographer of the Year in 2003 by American Photo Magazine
- Bill Pellington (1927–1994), linebacker who played 12 seasons in the NFL for the Baltimore Colts
- Jimmie Rivera (born 1989), professional mixed martial artist who competes in UFC as a bantamweight
- Ariel A. Rodriguez (1947–2017), judge who served as acting Justice of the New Jersey Supreme Court
- Pete Rohrman (born 1970), political activist and the New Jersey Libertarian Party nominee in New Jersey's 2017 gubernatorial election
- Wesley Schultz (born 1982), guitarist and lead vocalist of The Lumineers
- Tommy Sweeney (born 1995), tight end for the Buffalo Bills
- Justin Trattou (born 1988), defensive end for the Minnesota Vikings and former player on the New York Giants
- Buck Williams (born 1960), NBA All-Star who lived in Ramsey during the 1980s while playing for the New Jersey Nets

== Sources ==
- Municipal Incorporations of the State of New Jersey (according to Counties) prepared by the Division of Local Government, Department of the Treasury (New Jersey); December 1, 1958.
- Clayton, W. Woodford; and Nelson, William. History of Bergen and Passaic Counties, New Jersey, with Biographical Sketches of Many of its Pioneers and Prominent Men., Philadelphia: Everts and Peck, 1882.
- Harvey, Cornelius Burnham (ed.), Genealogical History of Hudson and Bergen Counties, New Jersey. New York: New Jersey Genealogical Publishing Co., 1900.
- Van Valen, James M. History of Bergen County, New Jersey. New York: New Jersey Publishing and Engraving Co., 1900.
- Westervelt, Frances A. (Frances Augusta), 1858–1942, History of Bergen County, New Jersey, 1630–1923, Lewis Historical Publishing Company, 1923.
