= Yeshiva of Nitra =

Coordinates: 40.707241°N 73.959912°W

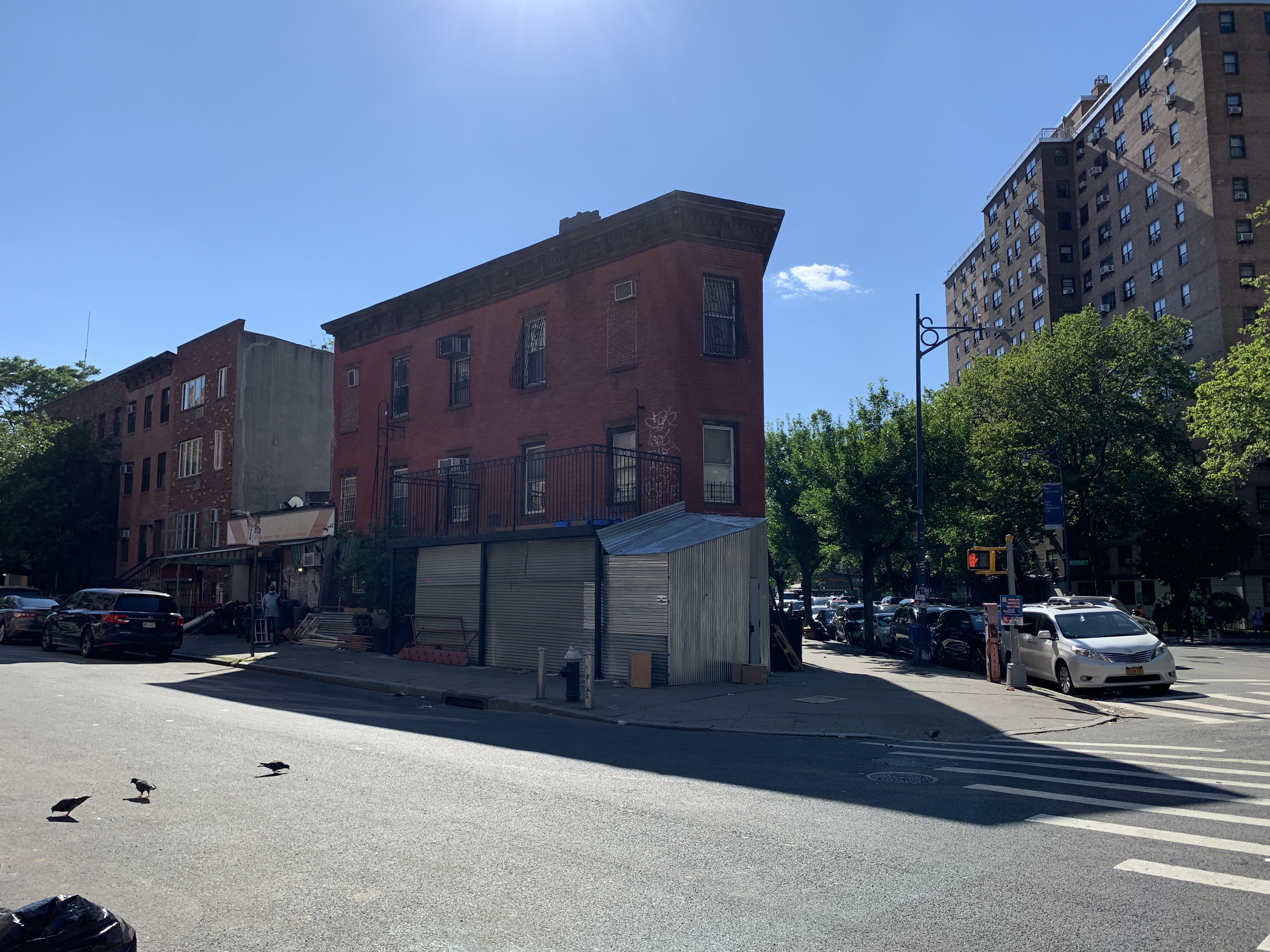
- Location in Brooklyn

Information
- Established: 1907 (in Slovakia) 1946 (in U.S.)
- President: Alexander Fischer
- Website: yeshivaofnitra.org

The Yeshiva of Nitra is a private Rabbinical college, or yeshiva, located in Brooklyn, New York; it has campuses in Chester and Mount Kisco, New York.

Its origins lie in the Yeshiva of Nitra, Slovakia, established in 1907. The Yeshiva was the last surviving yeshiva in occupied Europe during World War II.

The Rosh Yeshiva at that date was Rabbi Shmuel Dovid Ungar. His son, Rabbi Sholom Moshe Ungar, and son-in-law, Rabbi Michael Dov Weissmandl, survived the war (the latter is known for leading efforts to save the Jews of Slovakia and Hungary). They re-established the Yeshiva in the US in 1946, in Somerville, New Jersey, gathering surviving students from the original Nitra Yeshiva.

The yeshiva moved to Mount Kisco in 1949 thanks in particular to a gift of $85,000 from Israel Rogosin; for a description of this period, see Michael Dov Weissmandl § Establishment of an American yeshiva, as well as.

A men's college due to its nature as a Rabbinical college, it has a continuous calendar; that is, as opposed to an academic calendar. It grants Bachelor's degrees and first professional degrees only. Its president is Alexander Fischer. It is accredited by the Association of Advanced Rabbinical and Talmudic Schools.

As of December 2023, the college was on Heightened Cash Monitoring 2 by the US Department of Education, indicating "compliance issues."
