= Charles Ernest Hosking Jr. =

American soldier

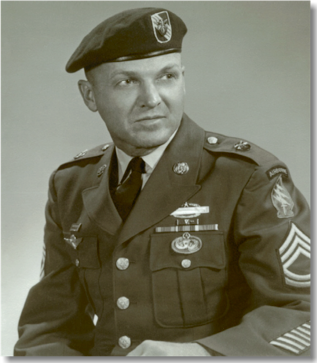
- Charles Ernest Hosking Jr. before going to serve in Vietnam c. 1965
- Born: May 12, 1924; Ramsey, New Jersey, U.S.
- Died: March 21, 1967 (aged 42); Đôn Luân district, Phuoc Long Province, South Vietnam
- Burial place: Valleau Cemetery, Ridgewood, New Jersey
- Military career
- Allegiance: United States
- Branch: United States Coast Guard; United States Army
- Service years: 1941–1942 (Coast Guard); 1943–1967 (Army)
- Rank: Master Sergeant (posthumous)
- Nickname: Snake
- Units: 509th Parachute Infantry Battalion; 5th Special Forces Group; 1st Special Forces Command
- Conflicts: World War II; Vietnam War †
- Awards: Medal of Honor; Bronze Star Medal (2) with "V" device Army Commendation Medal; Purple Heart Medal

Charles Ernest Hosking Jr. (May 12, 1924 – March 21, 1967) was a United States Army Special Forces soldier who received the U.S. military's highest decoration, the Medal of Honor, for his actions in the Vietnam War. He was awarded the medal posthumously for holding a Viet Cong prisoner with a live grenade, taking the brunt of the blast rather than allowing the prisoner to reach several of his commanders.

== Biography ==
Born on May 12, 1924, in Ramsey, New Jersey, Hosking left high school to join the Canadian Army in 1941 when he was 16 years old and was discharged one month later for being underage. With his grandfathers permission, he joined the U.S. Coast Guard at the age of 17. After serving beach patrol duties he was discharged from the Coast Guard because of a heart condition in December 1942. Still wanting to serve and with the assistance of his congressman he was inducted into the Army on May 1, 1943. During World War II, Hosking served first with the 69th Infantry Division, then with the 509th Parachute Infantry Battalion serving in Italy, France and the Battle of the Bulge, where he would be Wounded. He served in Vietnam as a sergeant first class in Company A of the 5th Special Forces Group (Airborne), 1st Special Forces Regiment. On March 21, 1967, he was working as an advisor to a Civilian Irregular Defense Group battalion in Đôn Luân district, Phuoc Long Province, when a Viet Cong sniper was captured. As Hosking prepared to transport the prisoner to base camp, the man grabbed a hand grenade from Hosking's belt, armed it, and ran towards the 4-man company command group. Hosking tackled the prisoner and held him to the ground, using the prisoner's body and his own to shield others from the grenade blast. Both he and the Viet Cong prisoner were killed in the ensuing explosion. Hosking was posthumously promoted to master sergeant and awarded the Medal of Honor for this action.

== Medal of Honor citation ==
Hosking's official Medal of Honor citation reads:

For conspicuous gallantry and intrepidity in action at the risk of his life above and beyond the call of duty. Master Sergeant Hosking (then Sergeant First Class), Detachment A-302, Company A, greatly distinguished himself while serving as company advisor in the III Corps Civilian Irregular Defense Group Reaction Battalion during combat operations in Don Luan District. A Viet Cong suspect was apprehended and subsequently identified as a Viet Cong sniper. While MSG Hosking was preparing the enemy for movement back to the base camp, the prisoner suddenly grabbed a hand grenade from MSG Hosking's belt, armed the grenade, and started running towards the company command group which consisted of 2 Americans and 2 Vietnamese who were standing a few feet away. Instantly realizing that the enemy intended to kill the other men, MSG Hosking immediately leaped upon the Viet Cong's back. With utter disregard for his personal safety, he grasped the Viet Cong in a "Bear Hug" forcing the grenade against the enemy soldier's chest. He then wrestled the Viet Cong to the ground and covered the enemy's body with his body until the grenade detonated. The blast instantly killed both MSG Hosking and the Viet Cong. By absorbing the full force of the exploding grenade with his body and that of the enemy, he saved the other members of his command group from death or serious injury. MSG Hosking's risk of his life above and beyond the call of duty are in the highest tradition of the U.S. Army and reflect great credit upon himself and the Armed Forces of his country.

== Other honors ==
After Hosking's death, the Special Forces compound at Bien Hoa, RVN was named C.E. "Snake" Hosking Compound. Hosking was buried at Valleau Cemetery in Ridgewood, New Jersey. Hosking Field House was dedicated in his memory in May 1971 at Fort Bragg, North Carolina. Hosking Way, a road off of Darlington Avenue in Ramsey, New Jersey is named in his honor. His name is on the Vietnam Veterans Memorial wall at Panel 17E, Line 5. Hosking is memorialized in a plaque at Veterans Park in his hometown of Ramsey.

== Medals and Commendations ==

Badge	Combat Infantryman Badge with star denoting 2nd award		
1st row	Medal of Honor		Bronze Star Medal with "V" Device and 1 Oak leaf cluster
3rd row	Purple Heart with 1 Oak leaf cluster	Air Medal	Army Commendation Medal
5th row	Army Good Conduct Medal with 6 Good Conduct Loops	American Campaign Medal	European-African-Middle Eastern Campaign Medal with Arrowhead Device and 2 Campaign stars
7th row	World War II Victory Medal	Army of Occupation Medal	National Defense Service Medal with 1 Oak leaf cluster
8th row	Armed Forces Expeditionary Medal	Vietnam Service Medal with 3 Campaign stars	Vietnam Campaign Medal
Badge	Master Parachutist Badge		
Unit Awards	Presidential Unit Citation with 2 Oak leaf clusters		RVN Gallantry Cross Unit Citation with Palm

=== Patches ===
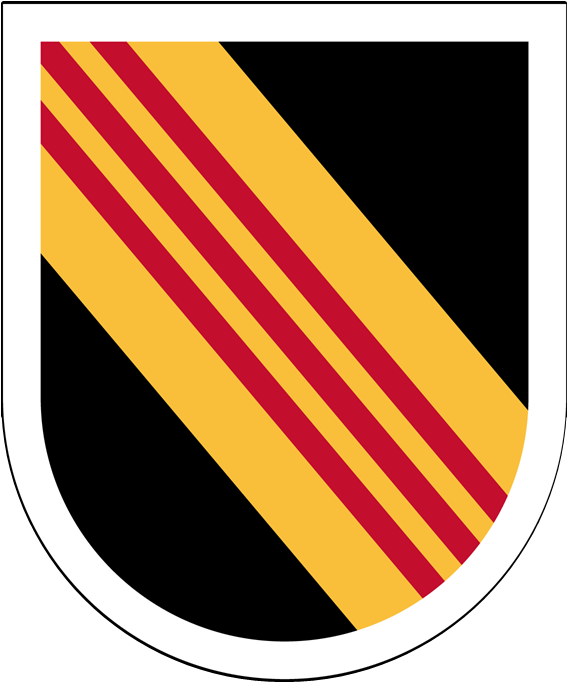

69th Infantry Division Insignia	82nd Airborne Division Insignia	5th Special Forces Group Flash

== See also ==
- List of Medal of Honor recipients for the Vietnam War

== Notes ==
=== Bibliography ===
- "Master Sergeant Charles Ernest Hosking Jr, USA". Their Finest Hour. theirfinesthour.net. Archived from the original on 12 July 2018.
- Gilberg, Gail Hosking (1997). Snake's Daughter: The Roads In and Out of War. Iowa City, Iowa: University of Iowa Press. ISBN 0-87745-586-4.
- Kelley, Michael P. (2002). Where We Were in Vietnam. Hellgate Press, Central Point, Oregon. ISBN 978-1-55571-625-7.
