= Out (1957 film) =

- Directed by: Lionel Rogosin (pictures)
- Written by: John Hersey
- Produced by: Thorold Dickinson
- Cinematography: Gerald Gregoire
- Edited by: Alexander Hammid
- Release date: 1957
- Running time: 25 minutes

Out was a short film produced by the United Nations Film Board and directed by Lionel Rogosin on the refugee situation in Austria as a result of Hungarian Revolution of 1956. The film was conceived 28 November 1956, filming began on 3 December 1956, and the answer print was screened on 4 January 1957.
