= Ewart Guinier =

Jamaican-American academic and lawyer (1910–1990)

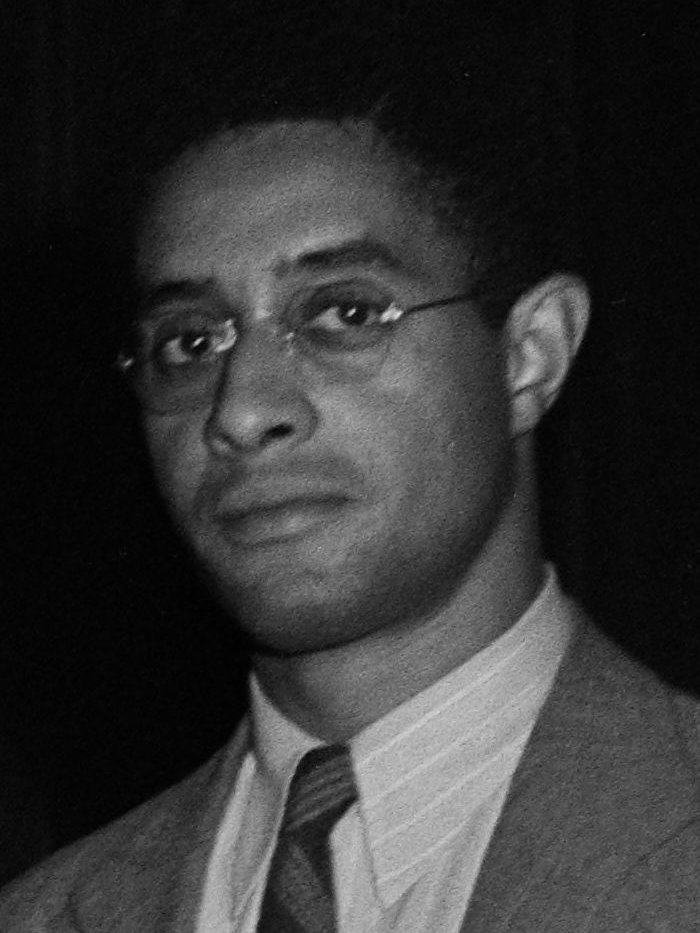
- Guinier c. 1941
- Born: Ewart Gladstone Guinier; May 17, 1910; Panama Canal Zone
- Died: February 4, 1990 (aged 79); Bedford, Massachusetts, U.S.
- Education: Harvard University; City College of New York (BA); Columbia University (MA)

Ewart Gladstone Guinier (May 17, 1910 – February 4, 1990) was a Jamaican-American educator, lawyer, and labor leader. He was the founding chairman of Harvard University's Afro-American Studies department, now known as the Department of African and African-American Studies.

== Early life and education ==
Ewart Guinier was born to Howard and Marie-Louise Beresford Guinier on May 17, 1910, in the Panama Canal Zone. His parents were Jamaican immigrants living under segregation in the Canal Zone; his father worked as a lawyer and real estate agent, and his mother was a bookkeeper. Following his father's death in 1919, his mother emigrated to Boston. Guinier joined her there in 1925, when he was 15 years old. He attended Boston English High School.

After high school, Guinier studied at Harvard College, beginning his freshman year in 1929. Guinier was one of only a few Black students at the university at the time, and he faced pervasive discrimination, including exclusion from the dormitory system and being ruled ineligible for financial aid. He later told The New York Times that upon his arrival on campus, he received a letter stating that his request for off-campus housing had been approved – despite the fact that he had never made such a request. Guinier experienced outright social ostracism from white classmates, but was able to make friends with Black upper-class men, including Robert Weaver and Frank Snowden. He became a member of the Alpha Phi Alpha fraternity in 1930.

As the Great Depression took hold, Guinier struggled to afford the costs of his education, and decided to leave Harvard after his sophomore year. He moved to New York City to finish his degree tuition-free at City College, taking night classes while working a day job as a freight elevator operator at the New York Times building. Guinier graduated summa cum laude in 1935, then went on to earn a master's from Columbia University's Teacher's College in 1939.

In 1956, already midway through a career in labor organizing and politics, Guinier returned to graduate study and completed a law degree from New York University in 1959.

== Career ==
=== Labor and politics ===
In 1935, Ewart Guinier began working as head of the Men's Service Rating Bureau, part of the New York City Department of Welfare. Two years later, he took the Civil Service examination and became an examiner at the same department. He went on to a post as Chief of the Civil Service Commission.

Guinier's involvement with trade unionism began while he was at the Rating Bureau: he and other Black employees were only hired on a temporary basis, and they organized to advocate for permanent status. Guinier would become the first chairman of the Rating Bureau local of the State, County, and Municipal Employees of American (SCMEA). The New York City locals left the SCMEA in the mid-1930s, to join the Congress of Industrial Organizations (CIO) as the State, County, and Municipal Workers Union (SCMU). Guinier served as chairman of the SCMU for the New York State region.

During World War II, Guinier served in the Army in the Pacific. When he returned to New York, he resumed his involvement with the labor movement. In 1946, after a merger with a Washington-based union, the SCMU had become the United Public Workers (UPW). Guinier served as a regional director for the UPW, then as secretary treasurer for its New York district. In 1948, he became international secretary treasurer – a position that made him the second-highest-ranked official in the union. Black workers made up one third of the UPW's membership, and the union's organizing efforts combated the racist and discriminatory practices of federal and state employers. Guinier would write in 1951 that "the U.S. government is the nation's biggest Jim Crow employer."

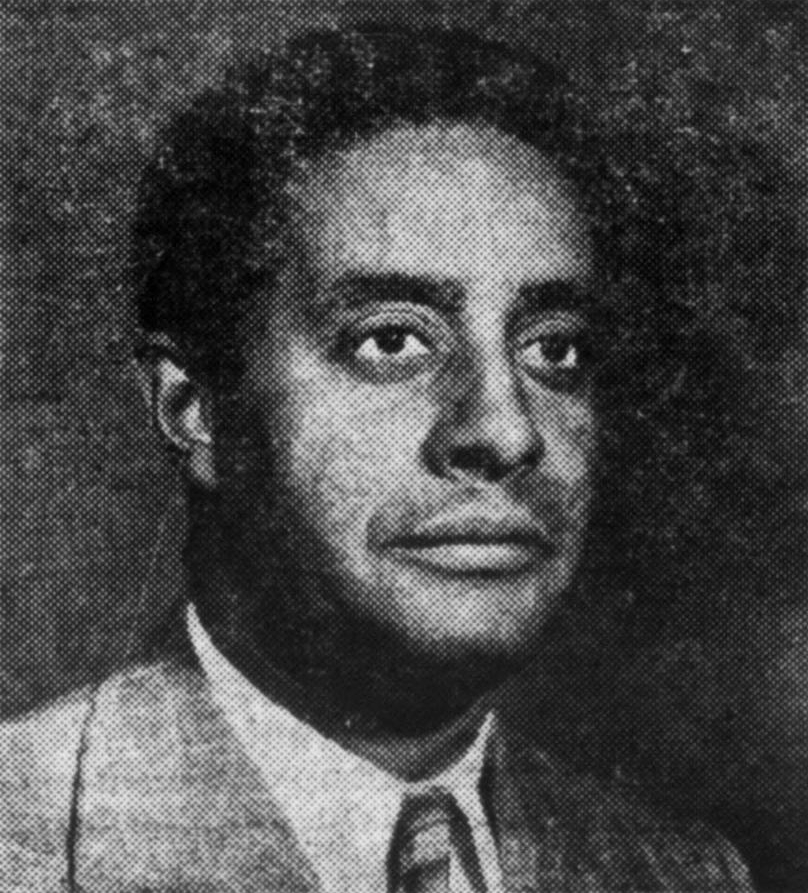
Guinier c. 1949

In 1949 Guinier ran for Manhattan Borough President on the American Labor Party ticket, the first Black candidate to be nominated for that office by any party. His campaign was chaired by attorney Hope Stevens, who wrote that the campaign "would put an end to the lily-white standards of other political parties which have long denied the Negro people of New York political representation in our city government." Guinier's platform was pro-labor and antiracist. He promoted policy ideas that would support fair employment practices and root out housing discrimination. He received 38 percent of the votes cast in that race, and lost to the Democratic Party candidate, Robert Wagner.

In 1950, in the midst of a nationwide red scare, the UPW was purged from the CIO because of its connections to the Communist Party. It was dissolved in 1953.

Guinier continued to be active in labor and community organizing both nationally and locally. He helped to found the Harlem Affairs Committee in 1953, and the Jamaica Coordinating Council in 1962. He was also involved in Communist organizations, including the Harlem Trade Union Council, which he co-founded with Ferdinand Smith, and the National Negro Labor Council, where he was a founding member and a vice president. He was a member of the National Urban League, and served as chairman of the Queens Urban League from 1962 to 1968.

=== Higher education ===
In 1968, Guinier left a post as the executive director of the Brownsville Community Corporation to become an associate director at the Urban Center at Columbia University, where he focused on community programming. The Urban Center was founded in the aftermath of student and community protest over Columbia's role in maintaining a divide between the Morningside Heights and Harlem neighborhoods, which activists described as segregationist in both intent and result.

Not long after taking this role at Columbia, Guinier was hired away by Harvard University. He started work there as a full professor in 1969, the year the Afro-American Studies department was founded in response to student protestors' demands for better academic representation. He was appointed as the department's first chairman, a position he held until 1976. Guinier described the department's mission as an effort to "study the black experience from the point of view of the people who have lived that experience."

As a professor, Guinier taught courses on African American involvement in the labor movement before World War II, and the Civil Rights Movement's fight for Black self-determination in the postwar period. He was involved with Black affinity groups at Harvard, including the Harvard-Radcliffe Association of African and African American Students (Afro), the Harvard-Radcliffe African American Cultural Center, the Pan-African Liberation Committee (PALC) and the Student Organization for Black Unity. Guinier also corresponded with students from all over the United States who wrote to him seeking advice and information to help them start Black Studies departments at their own institutions.

Guinier spoke out against institutional racism at Harvard, and advocated for the inclusion of Black perspectives in the teaching and writing of American history. At times he came into conflict with the university's administration and other faculty members, some of whom opposed the existence of a department specializing in Black studies. His non-academic background earned him little respect and put him at a disadvantage inside of an institution that seemed intent on obstructing the very work it had hired him to do. In 1973 Guinier told the Harvard Crimson that "the Faculty Council expects me to run the department as I would run a race: they bind my feet, tie my hands, gag and blindfold me – and then want me to do a good job."

One of his most vocal opponents was Martin Kilson, a Black political scientist and professor of government. Guinier and Kilson appeared together on the New York City television program Positively Black for a televised debate on the subject in 1973. Kilson argued that the study of Black experience and perspectives could be folded into existing departments; Guinier answered that that would be impossible at a university where major departments, such as English and Economics, lacked Black faculty members entirely.

Over the course of his career, he held membership in many professional organizations and associations, including the Association for the Study of African African American Life and History, the Boston Area Black Studies Consortium, and the National Association of Black and Ethnic Studies Directors.

Guinier retired from Harvard in 1980 and retained the title of Professor Emeritus. He became the national chairman of the National Council of American-Soviet Friendship, before fully retiring in 1985.

== Personal life ==
Guinier married Doris Cumberbatch, a teacher, in 1933. The couple had one daughter, named Chlotilde.

Guinier remarried in 1945, to Eugenia "Genii" Paprin, a European Jewish teacher. They met during his Army service in Hawaii; at the time, Genii was the director of the Honolulu Labor Canteen, a leftist alternative to the USO. Ewart and Genii had three daughters: Sary, Marie-Louise, and Lani. Lani Guinier became a civil rights lawyer, and joined the Harvard Law School as a tenured faculty member in 1998. In a speech that year, she honored her father's legacy, saying that he "taught me to speak in my own voice."

Ewart Guinier died on February 4, 1990, of Alzheimer's disease, at the Veterans' Hospital of Bedford, Massachusetts. He was 79 years old.

== Legacy ==
Ewart Guinier's papers are collected in the Schomburg Center archives at the New York Public Library.
