= Black Fantasy =

- Directed by: Lionel Rogosin
- Written by: Jim Collier (improvised dialogue)
- Produced by: Lionel Rogosin
- Starring: Jim Collier, Ellie Fiscalini, Elena Hall, Hollis Hanson, Denise Hogan-Bey
- Cinematography: J. Robert Wagoner, Louis Brigante (montage)
- Edited by: Louis Brigante
- Music by: Morris Goldberg, Shunmugam A. Pillay
- Release date: 1972
- Running time: 77 minutes
- Country: United States
- Language: English

Black Fantasy is the fifth feature-length film produced and directed by American independent filmmaker Lionel Rogosin. It starred Jim Collier, who is credited also with "dialogue improvised by." Collier and Rogosin had previously worked together in Black Roots, produced two years earlier.

Largely improvised, it is Lionel Rogosin's most formally experimental film.

== See also ==
- List of American films of 1972
