= Israel Rogosin =

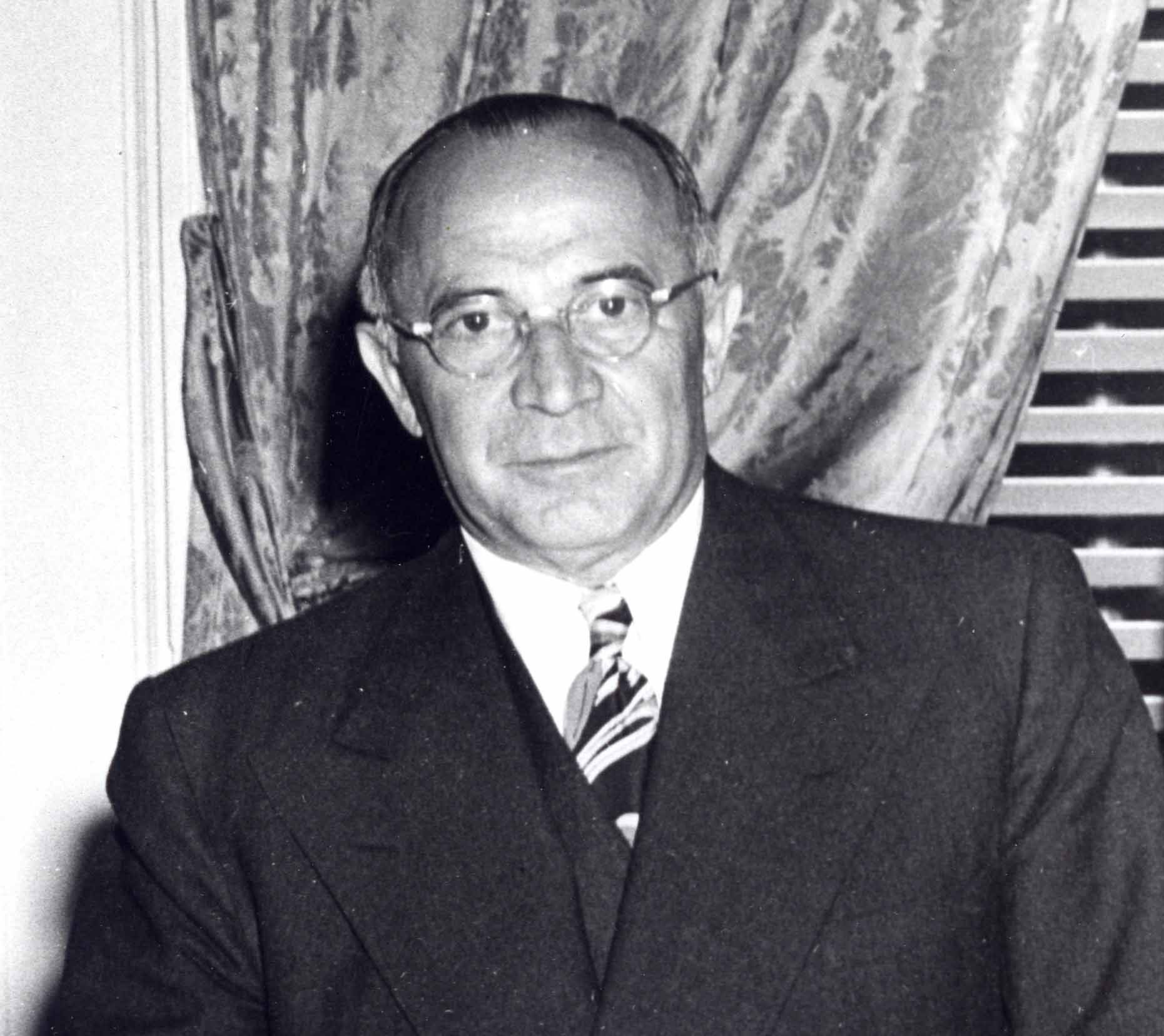
- Rogosin (undated)
- Born: March 15, 1887; Valozhyn, Russian Empire
- Died: April 28, 1971 (aged 84); Allenhurst, New Jersey, U.S.
- Occupation: Industrialist
- Children: Lionel Rogosin
- Parent(s): Samuel Eliezer Rogosin; Hanna Rogosin

Israel Rogosin (March 15, 1887 – April 28, 1971) was an American industrialist in the textile industry and a philanthropist.

== Early life ==
Rogosin was born to a Lithuanian Jewish family of Samuel Eliezer and Hanna in Valozhyn, then part of the Russian Empire (now in Belarus). His father came to the United States in 1890 upon request of the head of the Yeshiva in Valozhyn, the Netziv, in order to collect funds for it.

Samuel Rogosin founded a small textile mill in Brooklyn in 1895 and was joined by his wife and four children a year later. Samuel decided to become a head of a Yeshiva and therefore left the mill management in Israel's hands, Israel was 16 years old then. The mill employed about 200 workers in 1912 and due to Israel's successful management and acquisition of other mills, Rogosin employed in 1920 about a thousand workers in five mills. The Beaunit Corporation was founded in 1921.

== Rogosin Industries ==
Rogosin founded Rogosin Industries Ltd. in April 1956 as a rayon yarn and tow plant. Upon request of the Israeli finance minister then, Pinchas Sapir, the plant was moved in 1958 to the newly established town of Ashdod in Israel after the Israeli government supplied an area of 1000 dunams for its establishment.

In 1963 Rogosin sold his shares in the Beaunit Corp.. At that time the company employed about 10,000 employees with an annual revenue of 150 million dollars.

== Later life and legacy ==
In 1949, he made a gift of $85,000 to help the establishment of yeshiva Nitra in the USA.

In 1966 Rogosin donated $1 million to the establishment of a Center for Jewish Ethics at Yeshiva University in New York

He died in Allenhurst, New Jersey. His only son Lionel Rogosin, an independent American filmmaker, was born in 1924.

He also founded The Rogosin Institute, a not-for-profit medical treatment and research institution for kidney disease in New York City, by giving a total of 4 million dollars in 1962 and 1965.

== Philanthropy in Israel ==
Convinced by his son Lionel Rogosin to support the new State of Israel, he participated to the foundation of Ashdod in particular with a rayon factory and schools.

He donated "$2.5 million through the Jewish Agency's Education Fund toward the construction of ten high schools throughout Israel." In his honor, Ashdod's main street and two of its schools are named after him. Three of the high schools he funded were located in Ashdod.

In 1960, Rogosin also donated money to the Jewish National Fund to plant a 100,000 eucalyptus pulp forest near Ruhama in the Northern Negev. He is still to this day one of the top donors in the history of Israel.

All together Mr.Rogosin donated 16 million dollars in the 1960s to Israel. Twelve million for industry and 4 million for schools.
