= Michelle Fine =

American academic

Michelle Melody Fine is an American academic in the fields of psychology, American studies, and urban education. She is a distinguished professor at the City University of New York. Her research includes the topics of social injustice and resistance and urban education. Fine is also an author and has written several works, one of her most known being Muslim American Youth (2008). Fine's work integrates critical psychological theory with feminist and post-colonial theory using participants and holds strong commitments to research for social justice.

== Career ==
Michelle Fine has a Ph.D. in Social Psychology from Teachers College of Columbia University. She is a professor of Critical Psychology, Women's Studies, American Studies, and Urban Education at the Graduate Center. She focuses on social injustice in terms of research and has given expert testimonies in legal cases such as The Military College of South Carolina and Valenzuela et al. vs. O’Connell and the California State Department of Education in which people of color in urban settings were not given adequate educational opportunities by California schools. She has also provided expert testimonies for women and influenced the victories of women who sued for acceptance to the Citadel Military Academy in Shannon Richey Faulkner and the US v. James E Jones, et al. for The Citadel. Later, she participated in drafting the Psychologists Amicus Brief in Graham and Sullivan v. State of Florida.

Fine is a founding faculty member of the Public Science Project, which produces theoretically informed and historically enriched research in social policy debates and organizing movements for educational equity and human rights. The Public Science Project has received more than $1,000,000 in grants from public institutions and private foundations that include the Rockefeller Foundation, Overbrook Foundation, and the Open Society Foundation. Fine has received degrees from Bank Street College and Lewis and Clark University and is also a commencement speaker.

== Work ==
Fine works in the Graduate Center of the City University of New York. She is a distinguished professor in Social Psychology, American Studies, Urban Education, and Women's Studies. She has been employed at this university since 1992. Previously, Fine worked for twelve years as the Goldie Anna Chaired Professor of Human Development at the University of Pennsylvania. At the City University of New York, she works to address theoretical questions focused around social injustice in relation to both youth in schools and criminal justice. Fine has worked with her students to publish over 80 articles in peer-reviewed U.S. and European psychological journals. She has been published in competitive journals in both psychological and educational fields over the past thirty years, including the Journal of Social Issues, the American Psychologist, the Counseling Psychologist, Harvard Educational Review, and Teachers College Record.

Michelle co-led a research collaborative at Queers for Economic Justice during the years 2007 to 2010. The group consisted of cis-gender lesbian, cis-gender gay, transgender, and gender non-conforming New York City residents of diverse ethnic background to study and collect data about the difficulty some people have with obtaining necessary government aid. Homelessness, incarceration, and poverty were some of the factors taken into account prior to producing a final draft of the survey. Participatory Action Research is a study approach used by these researchers and assistants to Billies to conduct the procurement of information needed to accomplish publicizing the research in an organized and timely manner. The data and the publication of "A FABULOUS ATTITUDE: Low income LGBTGNC People Surviving and Thriving on Love, Shelter and Knowledge" led to the mayoral administration of Bill de Blasio to sign into law many legislation geared to lessen discrimination against transgender New Yorkers and people of indigenous American and black African ancestry and Spanish-speaking ethnicity.

=== Awards ===
Fine has been a visiting scholar at the University of New Zealand. She has also been a Fulbright scholar at the Institute for Arab Studies at Haifi University. She and colleagues have given expert testimonies in over a dozen legal victories centered around gender, race, and class equity in education. Among other awards, Fine has received the 2013 American Psychological Association Award for Distinguished Contributions to Research in Public Policy, the 2012 Henry Murray Award from the Society for Personality and Social Psychology of the APA, the 2010 Social Justice and Higher Education Award from the college and Community Fellowship for her work in prisons, and the 2011 Elizabeth Hurlock Beckman Award for her legacy as a mentor over the past 25 years.

== Selected works ==
- The Changing Politics of Education: Privatization and the Dispossessed Lives of Those Left Behind, co-authored with Michael Fabricant, was published by Paradigm in 2013. The authors argue for equal education for all. She brings up the topic of privatization of schools including charter schools and other private institutions. The idea that comes up most passionately is that democracy is just a cover for meritocracy and the future of the US is based on the success of our children.
- Charter Schools and the Corporate Makeover of Public Education, co-authored with Michael Fabricant, was published by Teachers College Press in 2012. The book explores the gap between the promise and the performance of charter schools. The authors do not defend the public school system, which for decades has failed primarily poor children of color. They use empirical evidence to determine whether charter schooling is a valid alternative for poor children of color, and offers an authentic alternative for these children. Fine also writes about the history of charter schools in public education.
- Revolutionizing Education: Youth Participatory Action Research in Motion, co-edited with Julio Cammarota, was published by Routledge in 2008. The collection offers a broad basis for understanding this research methodology. With a combination of theory and practice, this collection combines student writings alongside those of major scholars in the field. While remaining sensitive to the methodological challenges of qualitative inquiry, Revolutionizing Education is the first definitive statement of Youth-led Participatory Action Research and how it relates to education.
- Muslim American Youth: Understanding Hyphenated Identities through Multiple Methods, co-authored with Selcuk R. Sirin, was published by New York University Press in 2008. The book is about post-9/11 America and how Muslim Americans are treated differently. These youth must fight against popular cultural representations of Muslim-men-as-terrorists and Muslim-women-as-oppressed. These are shown through the suspicious gaze of peers, teachers, and strangers, and police. The concern about not being American citizens when they are has led to controversy and a lack of understanding among their peers.
- Beyond Silenced Voices: Class, Race, and Gender in United States Schools, co-edited with Lois Weis, was published with SUNY Press in 1993, with a revised edition published in 2005. The collection addresses the humanity of students, specifically related to the power schools do or do not have to improve the lives of the educated. The book received a AESA Critics’ Choice Award in 2006.
- Working Method: Research and Social Justice, co-authored with Lois Weis, was published with Routledge with 2004. The book provides a guide to understanding and participating in contemporary social research.
- Off White: Readings on Power, Privilege, and Resistance, co-authored with Lois Weis, Linda Powell Pruitt, and April Burns, was published with Routledge in 1997. A second edition was published in 2004 and a third in 2012. This essay collection analyzes white privilege and how this concept is embedded in society today. In addition, authors consider politics and practices that challenge or encourage white privilege.
- Echoes of Brown:Youth Documenting and Performing the Legacy of Brown v. Board of Education, co-authored with Rosemarie A. Roberts and María Elena Torre, was published by City University of New York Press in 2004. In the novel and DVD pairing, the authors walk readers through the creation of the Art and Social Justice Institute. Interviews with urban teenagers and their experience with public school are seen through the lens of the infamous Brown v. Board of Education case.
