= Wurzweiler School of Social Work =

Division of Yeshiva University in New York, New York, United States

Coordinates: 40.84939°N 73.92957°W

Wurzweiler School of Social Work is the social work school of Yeshiva University. Founded in 1957, classes are held at Yeshiva University’s Wilf campus, in New York’s Washington Heights neighborhood, and Beren campus, in New York’s Murray Hill neighborhood.

Ranked by U.S. News and World Report among the top 100 Best Schools for Social Work in 2025, the Wurzweiler School also offers a fully online Master of Social Work program. Students have the option to focus their studies on Gerontology and Palliative Care Embedded Certification or the Credentialed Alcohol and Substance Abuse Counselor (CASAC) path.

== History ==
The Wurzweiler School was founded to serve the needs of Jewish communal agencies for well-educated social workers. Through the recent years of its existence, this emphasis has been diluted. This led to its involvement in starting schools of social work at Bar Ilan University in Israel and in Lusaka, Northern Rhodesia (now Zambia).

As of 2021, the dean is Danielle Wozniak with Jay Sweifach serving as Associate Dean & Director of the PhD Program. Previous deans of school were Sheldon Gelman and Carmen Ortiz Hendricks.

== Notable alumni ==
- Noach Dear (1953–2020), New York Supreme Court judge

== Rankings and reputation ==
As of 2024, it is ranked tied for 77th out of 319 schools for social work in the United States by U.S. News & World Report.

== See also ==
List of social work schools
