= Heitmeyer =

Heitmeyer is a German surname. Notable people with the surname include:

- Constance Heitmeyer, American electrical engineer
- Jayne Heitmeyer (born 1960), Canadian actress
- Wilhelm Heitmeyer (born 1945), German academic
