= Andreas Zick =

German education science professor

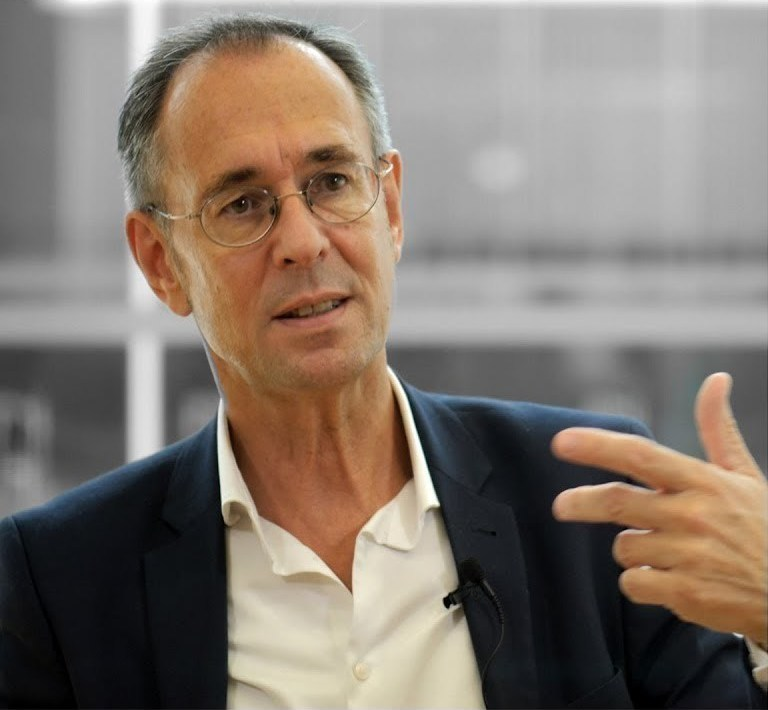
Andreas Zick, 2017

Andreas Zick (born 1962) is a professor of Socialization and Conflict Research at Faculty of Education Science, Bielefeld University.

== Academia ==
Zick is a professor for Socialization and Conflict Research at the Faculty of Education Science at the University of Bielefeld, Germany. Concurrent with that, he is also the associate member of the Institute for Interdisciplinary Research on Conflict and Violence, head of the research training group on Group-Focused Enmity (German Science Foundation 884), and associated member of the Faculty of Sociology.

One of his main research interests is socio-psychological intergroup research with its longstanding focus on analyzing the impact of prejudice and discrimination on the development and escalation of conflicts. The research on intergroup conflicts comprises the analysis of the influence of dominance orientation and its legitimacy.

Zick has pursued application-related aspects of research in his academic monitoring and consulting of practice-oriented projects for many years.

Another main emphasis of his work is on the research of acculturation, i.e., the analysis of processes of adoption of foreign cultural environments through groups. He is editor of the series Political Psychology, VS-Verlag and Gewalt- und Konfliktforschung, Juventa. Zick is member of the Council of Experts on “Antisemitism” of the Federal Government and also member of various academic advisory boards, e.g., “Federal Association of German Psychologists”; “Prevention of Violence, Right-Wing Extremism, and Intercultural Conflicts“.

== Research ==
- see papers & publications at: www.uni-bielefeld.de/ikg/zick
- Online against Right-Wing Extremisms (Consultation, Scientific Assistance)
- Muslim Media Project, cooperation with Institute for Strategic Dialogue, granted by Vodafone Foundation/British Council
- Integration of ethnic and religious minorities and intercultural conflict (since 2007)
- Group-focused enmity in Europe (since 2004)
- Group-focused enmity (VW-Foundation, Freudenberg-Foundation, Moellgaard Foundation, since 2004)
- Evaluation of intercultural trainings for police and shift supervisors (2002–2005)
- Intercultural closeness and distance within a district (IN+DI) (MASKSS-NRW, 2000–2002)
- Success and progress of the adoption of foreign environments by emigrants – EVA-A (1994–1999)

== Selected publications ==
- with Wilhelm Heitmeyer and B. Küpper. 2010. Prejudices and group-focused enmity – a socio-functional perspective. In Handbook Prejudice, eds. Pelinka et al. London: Cambria Press.
- with B. Doosje, A. Zimmermann, B. Küpper, and R. Meertens. (in press). Terrorist threat as a predictor of out-group discrimination and support for anti-immigration policies – Evidence from 9 European countries. International Review of Social Psychology.
- with K. Schmidt, eds. 2010. Prejudices and discrimination between groups – comparative perspectives. Special Issue International Journal of Conflict and Violence.
- 2010. Psychologie der Akkulturation – Neufassung eines Forschungsbereiches [Psychology of Acculturation – Renewal of a research field]. Wiesbaden: Verlag für Sozialwissenschaft.
- with B. Küpper. 2010. Religion and Prejudice in Europe – New Empirical Findings. Brussels: Alliance.
- with B. Küpper, A. Klein, and W. Heitmeyer, W. 2009. Monitoring misanthropy: Prospects and encouraging results of a Swiss-German comparison. In Right-wing Extremism in Switzerland: National and International Perspectives, ed. M. Niggli, 136–145. Baden-Baden: Nomos.
- with C. Wolf, B. Küpper, E. Davidov, P. Schmidt, and W. Heitmeyer. 2008. The syndrome of group-focused enmity: Theory and test. Special Issue on Prejudice and Discrimination in Europe, eds. by A. Zick, T. F. Pettigrew, and U. Wagner. Journal of Social Issues, 64: 363–383.
- with B. Küpper. 2005. Transformed anti-Semitism – a report on anti-Semitism in Germany. Journal für Konflikt- und Gewaltforschung 7: 50–92.
- with U. Wagner, R. van Dick, and T. Petzel. 2001. Acculturation and prejudice in Germany: Majority and minority perspectives. Journal of Social Issues, 57: 541–557.
- with T. F. Pettigrew, J. S. Jackson, J. Ben Brika, G. Lemaine, R. W. Meertens, and U. Wagner. 1998. Outgroup prejudice in Western Europe. In European Review of Social Psychology 8, eds. W. Stroebe and M. Hewstone, 241–273. Chichester: Wiley & Sons.

Personal Website at Bielefeld University
