= Parallel society =

Social group, often immigrant, living with reduced contact with the wider society

Parallel society is a self-organization of an ethnic or religious minority, often but not always immigrant groups, with the intent of a reduced or minimal spatial, social and cultural contact with the majority society into which they immigrate.

The term was introduced into the debate about migration and integration in the early 1990s by the German sociologist Wilhelm Heitmeyer. It rose to prominence in the European public discourse following the murder of Dutch director and critic of Islam Theo van Gogh. In 2004, the Association for the German Language ranked the term second in their Word of the year list. Since 2021, Denmark has used the term to define social housing estates where at least half the residents are from "non-Western" countries, as well as other factors such as high crime and unemployment rates.

== See also ==
- Parallel state
- Pillarisation
- Multiculturalism
- Leitkultur
- Auto-segregation
- Ghetto
- Ethnic enclave
- Dhimmi
- Parallel Polis, the deliberate creation of a parallel society to overcome oppressive systems
- Sensitive urban zone (France)
- Vulnerable residential area (Denmark)
- Vulnerable area (Sweden)
