= Heinz-Gerhard Haupt =

German historian (born 1943)

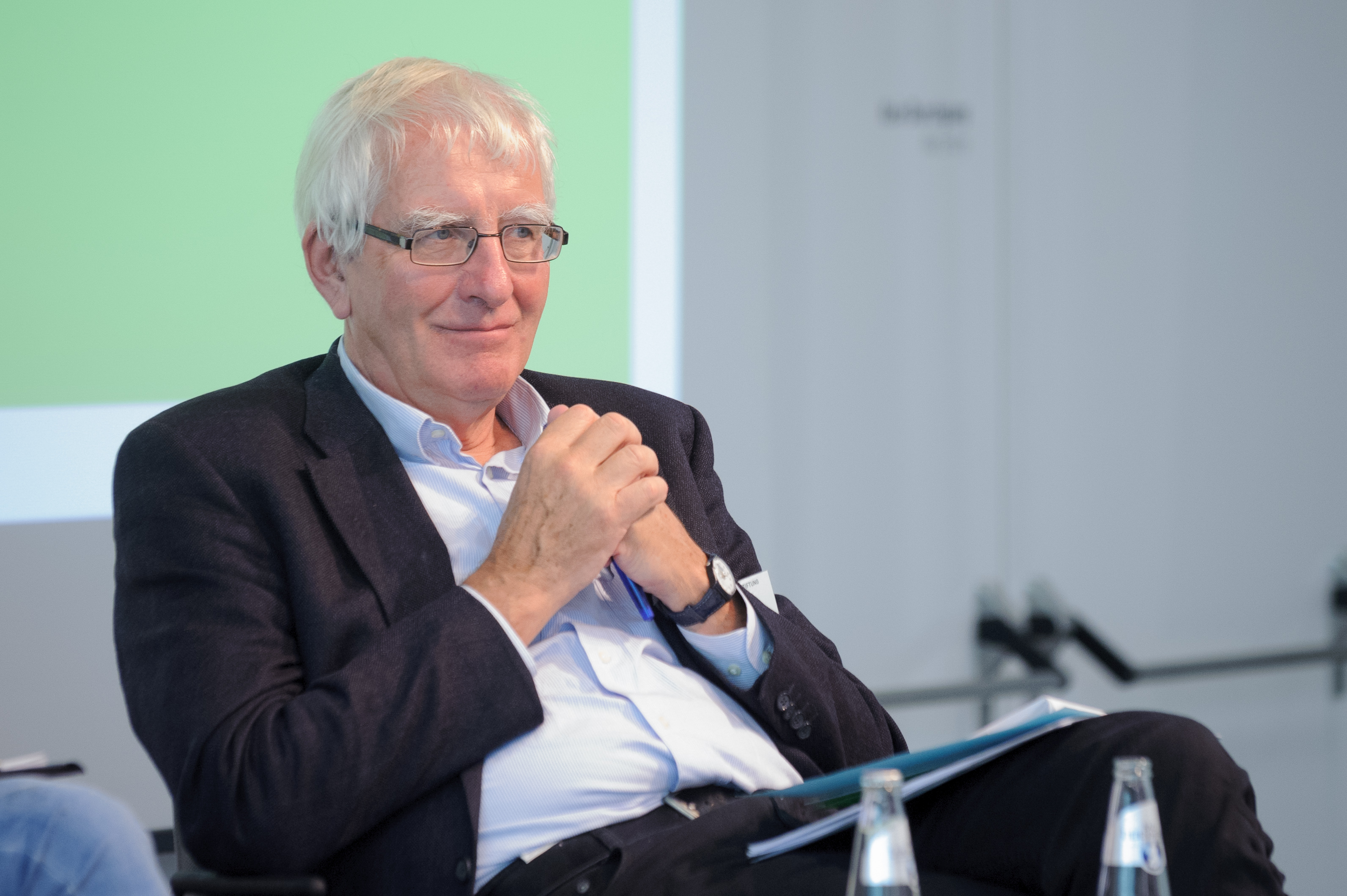
Heinz-Gerhard Haupt (2012)

Heinz-Gerhard Haupt iis a professor at Bielefeld University. He was born on 21 March 1943 in Göttingen. Since 1998, he has been the Professor of Social History at the Faculty of History, Theology, and Philosophy at Bielefeld.

== Academia ==
Heinz-Gerhard Haupt is Professor of Social History at the Bielefeld University, but until August 30, 2011, on a Sabbatical at the European University Institute in Florence. He heads two research projects of the Collaborative Research Center 584 “The Political as Communication Space in History”. He is co-applicant of the German Research Foundation's research unit “Youth Violence“ and board member of the Institute for interdisciplinary research on conflict and violence. His research focuses on the history of and relations between nationalism and religion in Europe, 19th and 20th century European history of consumption, and on the history of political violence in Europe since 1800. He is a member of advisory board of the Academia istropolitana (Bratislava), member of advisory board of the journal Genèse (Paris) and member of advisory board of the journal Comparativ (Leipzig).

== Research ==
- Political violence in Germany and France, 1870-1914 (Collaborative Research Center 584, 2008–2012)
- International Research Unit “Control of Violence“ (Center for Interdisciplinary Research, 2007–2008)
- Violence in Germany and France, 2nd half of the 19th Century (Collaborative Research Center 584, 2004–2008)
- Political radicalization in Europe (European Forum at the European University Institute, 2007–2008)

== Selected publications ==
- with Wilhelm Heitmeyer, S.Malthaner, and A. Kirschner, eds. 2010. Control of Violence. Historical and International Perspectives on modern Societies. New York: Springer.
- with J. Kocka. 2010. Comparison and Beyond. Traditions, Scope, and Perspectives of Comparative History. In Comparative and Transnational History. Central European Approaches and New Perspectives, eds. H.-G. Haupt and Jürgen Kocka, 1–30. New York: Berghahn.
- with N. Bulst, and I. Gilcher-Holthey, eds. 2008. Gewalt im politischen Raum [Violence in Political Space]. Frankfurt a. M.: campus.
- with K. Weinhauer, and J. Requate, eds. 2007. Terrorismus in der Bundesrepublik. Medien, Staat und Subkulturen in den 1970er Jahren. [Terrorism in the Federal Republic of Germany: Media, State, and Subcultures in the 1970s.] Frankfurt a. M.: campus.
- with R. Gerwardt, eds. 2006. Terrorism in Twentieth Century Europe: Comparative and Transnational Perspectives. Special Issue Revue Européenne d'Histoire 14(3): 275–281.
- with U. Frevert, eds. 2005. Neue Politikgeschichte [New Political History]. Frankfurt a. M.: campus.
- with Christoph Gusy, eds. 2005. Exklusion und Partizipation – Politische Kommunikation im historischen Wandel [Exclusion and Participation – Political Communication in Historical Transition]. Frankfurt a. M.: campus.
- ed. 2004. Au bonheur des Allemands. Special issue: Le Mouvement social 206
- with D. Langewiesche, eds. 2004. Nation und Religion in Europa. Mehrkonfessionelle Gesellschaften im 19.und 20.Jahrhundert.[Nation and Religion in Europe. Multiconfessional Societies in the 19th and 20th Century]. Frankfurt /New York: campus
- 2001. “Comparative History” and “History of Violence”. In International Encyclopedia of the Social and Behavioural Sciences, eds. Neil Smelser, and P. B. Baltes, 2397–3403 and 16196–16202. Oxford: Pergamon
- See also publications with Geoffrey Crossick

== References and external links ==
- Personal Website
- He is a member of the interdisciplinary working group "signatures of threat"
- http://www.uni-bielefeld.de/
