= Jost Reinecke =

Jost Reinecke (born 20 August 1957) is the professor of Quantitative Methods of Empirical Social Research at Faculty of Sociology, Bielefeld University.

== Academia ==
Jost Reinecke is Professor of Quantitative Methods of Empirical Social Research and board member of the Institute for interdisciplinary research on conflict and violence, member of the Center for Statistics (Zentrum für Statistik, ZeSt) and of the research training group on “group-focused enmity” (884) as well as of the ASA. His research focuses on rational-choice theories in social sciences; methodology and application of models of classification and structural equation in cross- and longitudinal studies; statistical techniques for the handling of missing data; health, AIDS-prevention and contraception of youth and young adults; development of juvenile delinquency in longitudinal studies; regional differentiation in the development of disorientation and group-focused enmity. He is associate editor of the series “Kriminologie und Kriminalsoziologie“(since 2006) and also associate editor of the series “Sozialwissenschaftliche Forschungsmethoden“(since 2009).

== Research ==
- Strong and efficient multiple imputation of complex records (DFG, 2009-ongoing)
- Crime in modern cities (DFG, 2002-ongoing)

== Selected publications ==
- with K. Boers, L. Mariotti and D. Seddig. 2010. Explaining the Development of Adolescent Violent Delinquency. European Journal of Criminology.
- with L. Mariotti. 2009. Detection of Unobserved Heterogeneity with Growth Mixture Models. Revista de Matemática: Teoría y Aplicaciones 16(1): 16–29.
- with K. Boers and D. Sedding. 2009. Sozialstrukturelle Bedingungen und Delinquenz im Verlauf des Jugendalters: Analysen mit einem kombinierten Markov- und Wachstumsmodell [Socio-structural conditions and delinquency in the course of adolescence: Analyses on the basis of a combined Markov and growth model]. Monatsschrift für Kriminologie und Strafrechtsreform 92(2/3): 267-288.
- with S. Legge and A. Klein. 2009. Das Kreuz des Wählers: Die Auswirkungen von politischer Entfremdung und Fremdenfeindlichkeit auf das Wahlverhalten in abgehängten Regionen [The voter’s burden: The effects of political alienation and xenophobia on voting patterns in left behind regions]. In Deutsche Zustände, vol. 7, ed. Wilhelm Heitmeyer, 53–72. Frankfurt a. M.: Suhrkamp Verlag.
- 2008. Klassifikation von Delinquenzverläufen: Eine Anwendung mit Mischverteilungsmodellen [Classification of courses of delinquency: An application of mixed distribution models]. In Klassifikationsanalysen in Theorie und Praxis, eds. J. Reinecke and C. Tarnai, 13–18. Münster, New York, Munich, Berlin: Waxmann.
- with K. Boers. 2007. Delinquenz im Jugendalter: Erkenntnisse einer Münsteraner Längsschnittstudie [Juvenile Delinquency: Findings of a longitudinal study conducted in the city of Münster]. Münster, New York, Munich, Berlin: Waxmann.
- with C. Weins. 2007. Delinquenzverläufe im Jugendalter [Courses of delinquency during adolescence]. Monatsschrift für Kriminologie und Strafrechtsreform 90(5): 418–437.
- with S. Hüpping. 2007. Abwärtsdriftende Regionen: Die Bedeutung sozioökonomischer Entwicklungen für Orientierungslosigkeit und Gruppenbezogene Menschenfeindlichkeit [Descending regions: The impact of socio-economic developments on disorientation and group-focused enmity]. In Deutsche Zustände, vol. 5, ed. Wilhelm Heitmeyer, 77–101. Frankfurt a. M.: Suhrkamp.
- 2007. The Development of Deviant and Delinquent Behavior of Adolescents: Applications of Latent Class Growth Curves and Growth Mixture Models. In Longitudinal Models in the Behavioral Sciences, eds. K. van Montford, H. Oud and A. Satorra, 239–266. Mahwah: Erlbaum.
- 2006. Longitudinal Analysis of Adolescents’ Deviant and Delinquent Behavior: Applications of Latent Class Growth Curves and Growth Mixture Models. Methodology 2(3): 100–112.
