= Gellerup =

- Neighborhood
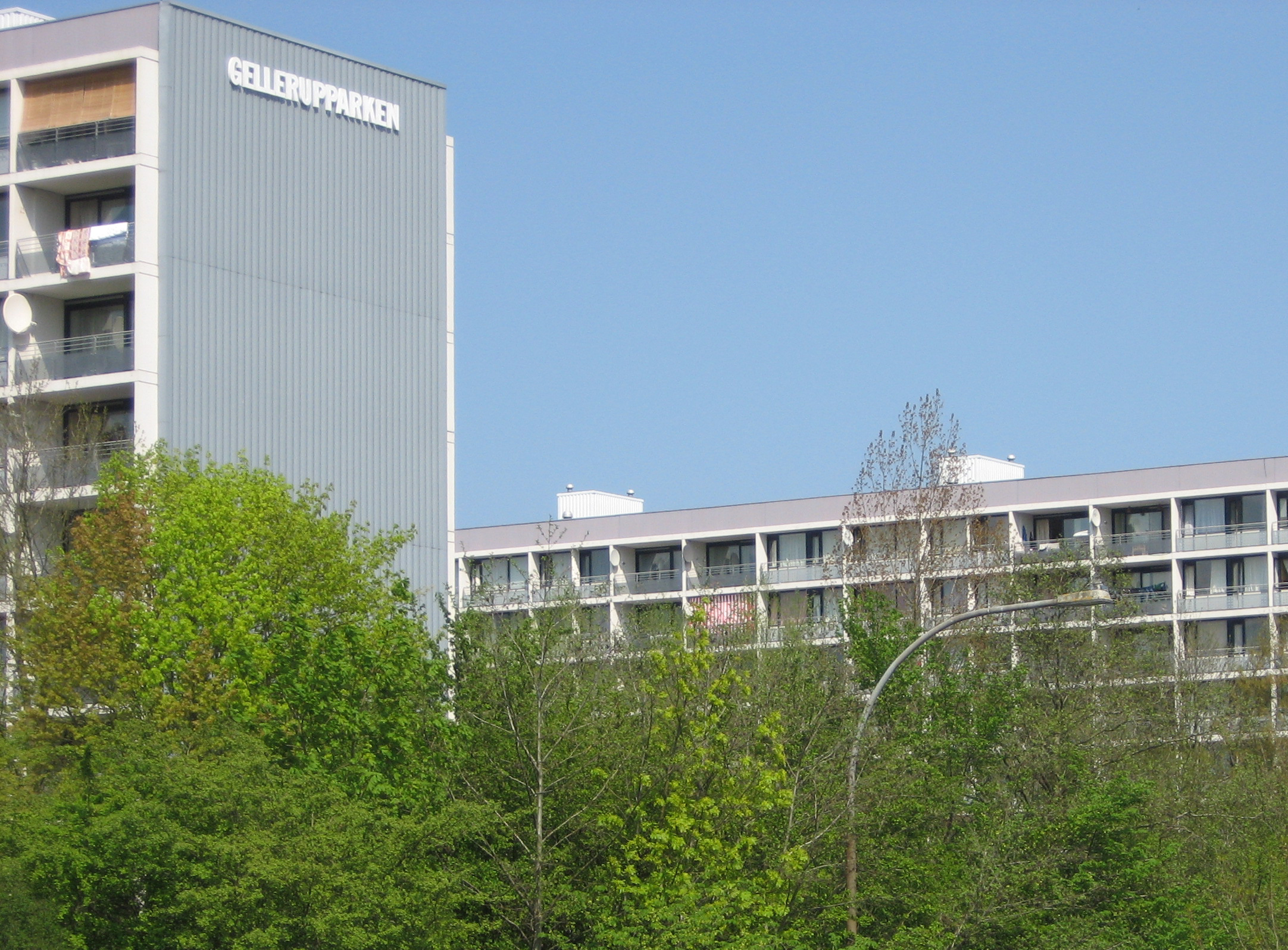
- The Gellerupparken urban development project

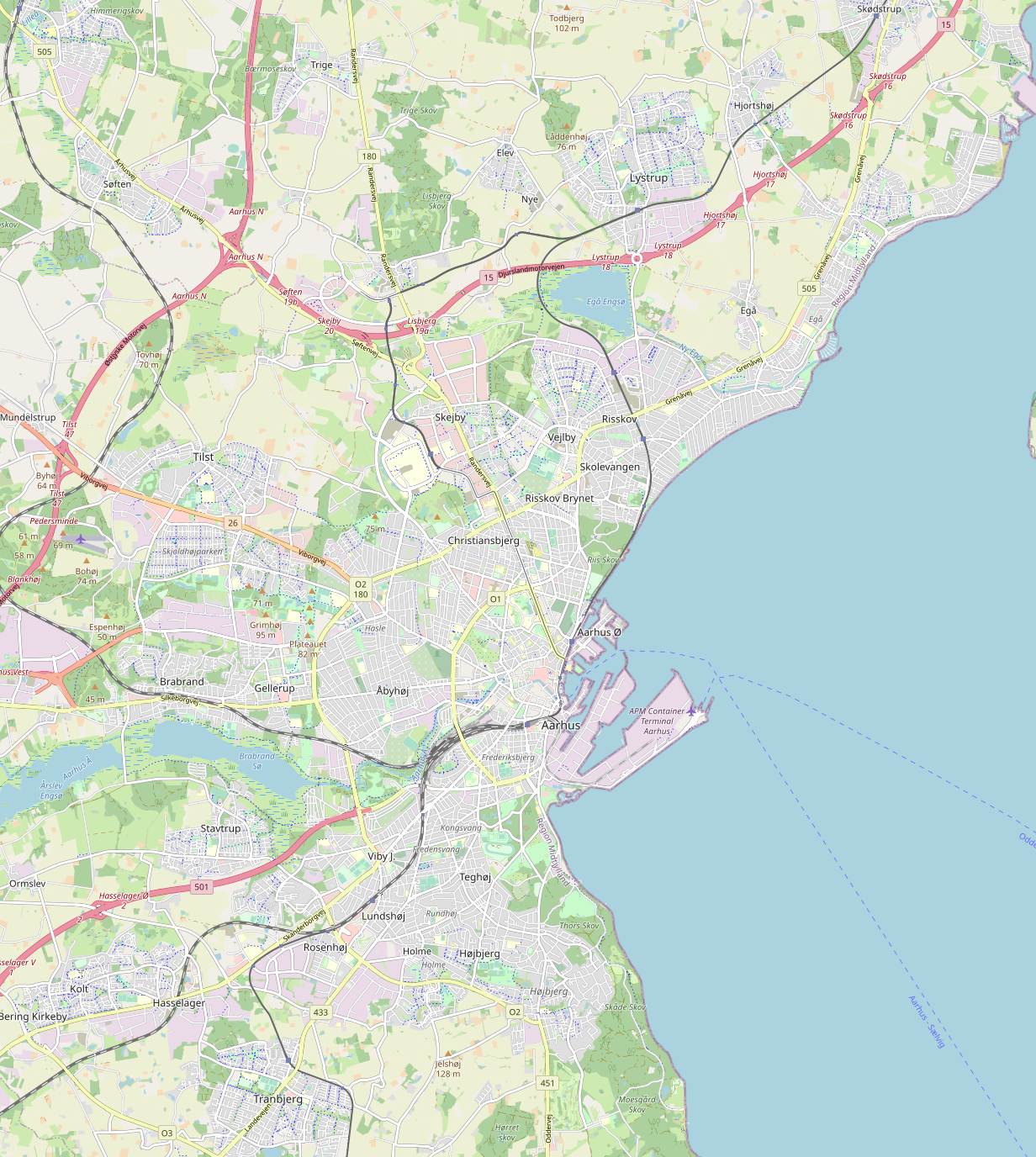
- Location within Aarhus
- Coordinates: 56.157267°N 10.135157°E
- Country: Kingdom of Denmark
- Regions of Denmark: Central Denmark Region
- Municipality: Aarhus Municipality
- District: Brabrand

Population (2012)
  - Total: 11,406
- Postal code: 8220 Brabrand

Gellerup is a neighborhood of the Brabrand district in the city of Aarhus, Denmark. The neighborhood was formerly a suburb that has now completely merged with the city and it is characterized by several natural attractions, detached house sectors, highrise apartments and an industrial park.

The name Gellerup is also commonly used to refer to the large residential area and housing project of the Gellerup Plan (Danish: Gellerupplanen) located within the neighborhood and comprising several residential areas including Toveshøj and the Gellerup park (Danish: Gellerupparken). The project houses people from many places in the world.

== The Gellerup Plan ==
=== History ===
To address housing problems that suddenly emerged in the late 1960s, Brabrand Housing Cooperative initiated and financed the Gellerup Plan. It was designed by architects Knud Blach Petersen and Mogens Harbo, who were influenced by the functionalistic ideas of Le Corbusier. The Gellerup Plan was constructed between 1968 and 1972, and contained a total of 2,448 apartments in two neighbouring sectors, Gellerupparken and Toveshøj, with 1,824 and 624 apartments respectively.

Even though the buildings are characterized by high rise concrete apartments, constructed from the usual large prefabricated concrete slabs, the project has a unique architectural value. The Gellerup Plan is the largest housing project in Denmark, with approximately 8,000 residents, but was originally planned to house more than twice as many people in 6,000 apartments.

The Gellerup Plan and its facilities, was all built as an architectural and functional unit, that at the same time makes it work as a self-supporting satellite city. This includes schools, kindergartens, sports facilities, a local waste incineration plant supplying central heating, a church, a library and a large mall that originally offered a post office, bank, dentist, doctors, general and grocery stores, supermarkets, restaurants, cafés, hairdressing saloons and a cinema among other stores and facilities. All these stores and structures were originally owned and administered democratically by the residents themselves through the Brabrand Housing Cooperative, based on a socialist idea. This ownership and administrative structure has changed a lot since these early years, for various reasons, but the architectural aspects remains.

The individual apartments of the Gellerup Plan were large, with open space between the blocks. They came equipped with bathrooms (some have two) and central heating (hot water circulation), where the energy is generated from the local waste incineration plant, collecting daily waste through a special tube system, reaching every apartment. This was all considered very luxurious for the vast majority of Aarhus citizens in the early 1960s.

=== Shopping ===
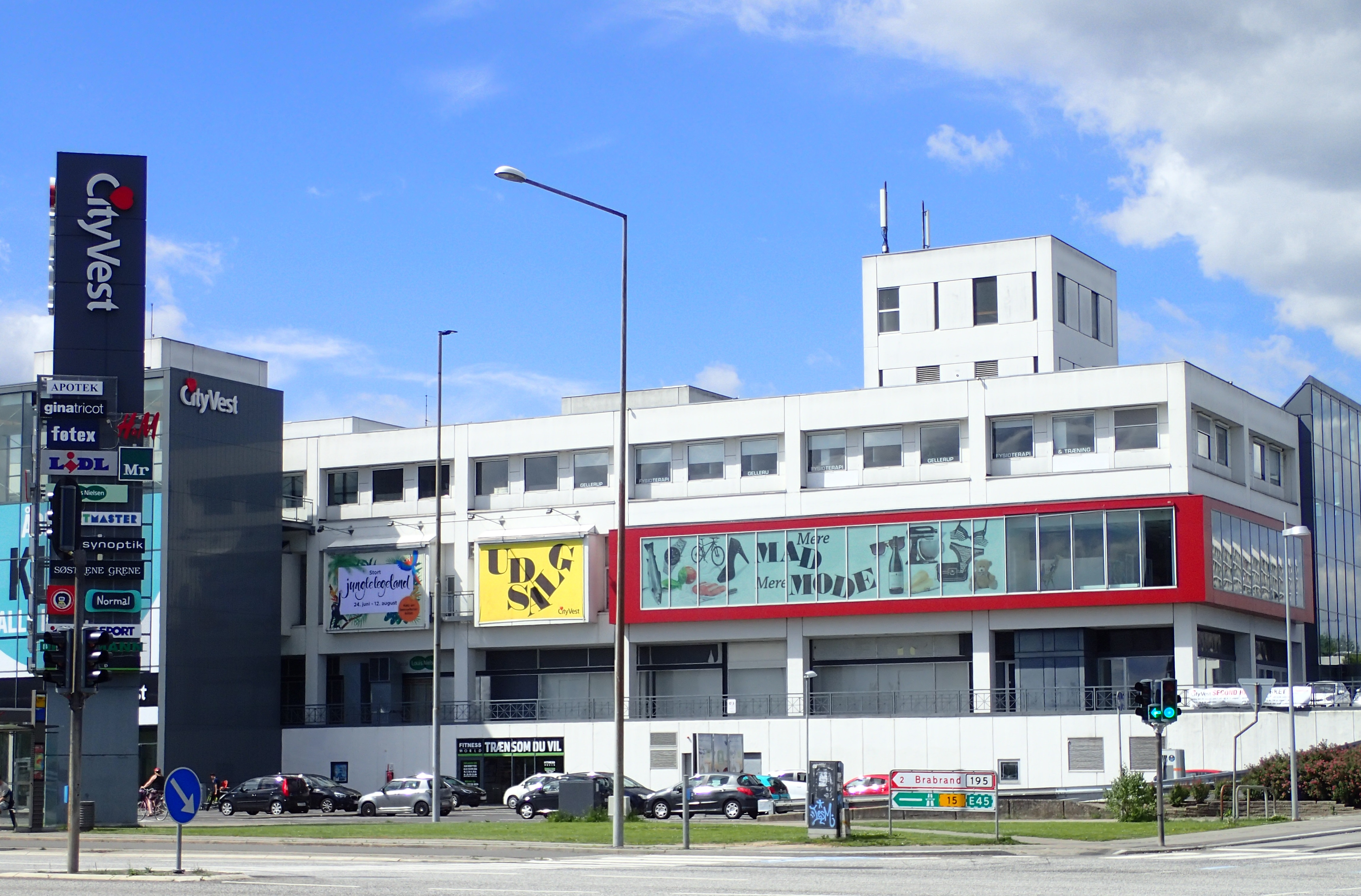
City Vest shopping mall

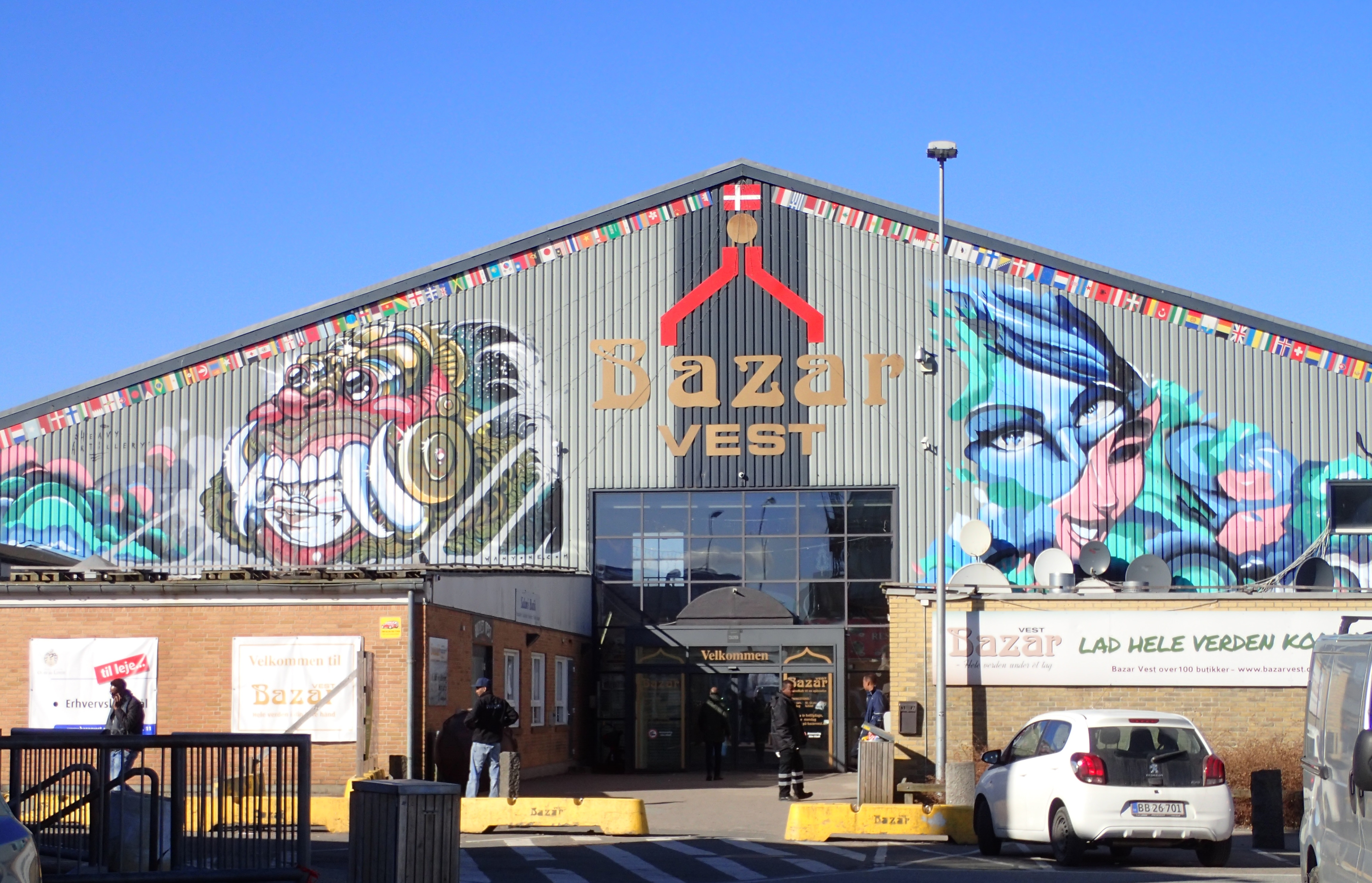
Bazar Vest

The mall now known as City Vest, was originally designed by the architectural firm of Tougård and the engineering company Nieport & Co. In its early days, the mall was named Gellerup Center and the buildings stood finished in 1972. A two-story building, with 45,000 m^{2} of floor space, it was at the time the largest mall in Denmark, and was owned in part by the Brabrand Housing Cooperative. It is now the third largest. Gellerup Center made great profits initially, but some of it was invested unwisely, and other communally owned elements of the housing projects (such as the swimming hall) were less successful. Eventually the cooperative sold their shares, and the Gellerup Center went bankrupt in 1976. The insurance company Baltica bought the Gellerup Center for kr 125.7 million, and redeveloped the building in 1980. The mall's name was changed to City Vest. Today, City Vest is owned by A. Enggaard, who, in february 2025, have begun the process of renovating the northern part of the mall, with plans to convert the southern part of it and parking space to residences They expect the new 12,000 m² mall to be completed in Q2 of 2026

Bazar Vest is a bazaar in the northern part of The Gellerup Plan, owned and developed by Danish building company Olav de Linde with shops, rented mostly by immigrants. The bazar has won the 'Erhvervslivets Ridderkors' prize for their efforts and successes in enculturation in 2006. After a 9,000 m² expansion in 2009, it now houses around 110 stands and Bazar Vest claims on its website to have around 30,000 visitors each week (with 10,000 at weekends).

=== Places of worship ===
The Grimhøj mosque (Danish: Grimhøjmoskeen) is located in the area of Gellerup. The imams at the mosque have repeatedly stirred controversy. They have taught that being unfaithful to a partner should be punished with stoning or whipping, as per Sharia law. During the summer of 2014, an imam from the Grimhøj mosque, Abdallah Khalid Ismail (alias Abu Bilal), visited a mosque in Berlin, where he asked for God to destroy all "Zionist Jews" during a Friday prayer (Jumu'ah). As the prayer was filmed, German authorities found imam Abu Bilal guilty of hate speech and issued a €10,000 (roughly DKK75,000) fine. The imams and former chairman of the mosque Oussama El-Saadi have also expressed sympathies for the Islamic State of Iraq and the Levant in several Danish media, including a 2014 DR TV documentary. In 2014, regional police authorities (Danish: Østjyllands Politi) found that of the 27 individuals who had travelled from the Gellerup area to participate in the war in Syria and Iraq, 22 had been visitors to Grimhøj mosque. In 2015, politicians called for the mosque to be closed. After public criticism, the mosque changed its policies, advising worshippers against participating in a war where Muslims fight other Muslims. Danish authorities gave the mosque part of the credit for war recruitment having dropped.

In 2016, journalists visited the mosque with a hidden camera, where imam Abu Bilal preached that women who were unfaithful to their husbands should be stoned to death or whipped, and infidels (who did not take part in Ramadan fasting) should be killed.

For many years, Muslim (and other) organizations have worked towards building a mosque in Gellerup. The project is still in the planning and fundraising phase, but has caused debate and demonstrations both for and against in Aarhus and Denmark.

In 2017, community leaders at the Grimhøj mosque mediated between the crime gangs Brabrand from Gellerupparken and Loyal To Familia which operates from the Bispeparken area. The leaders accepted the role as mediators as the gang members and their parents respected the mosque and the parents had expressed concerns over losing their children.

=== Degradation ===
The concrete buildings of Gellerupparken has experienced widespread and costly damage, due to construction issues, beginning shortly after they were built. As early as 1991, demolition was proposed, to save expenses, but renovation was initiated instead. Shortly after the construction of the apartments, increased economic capabilities in the working class segment, inspired many residents to buy a house, reflecting a similar development across Denmark. Soon many apartments in Gellerupparken became vacant. The problem was solved by renting out to new immigrants and the socially vulnerable in a collaboration with the municipality, but this approach eventually caused an increasing social degradation of the area.

The Gellerupparken district is currently the poorest neighborhood in Denmark, and has the highest density of immigrants in the country (88% of the residents). The Gellerup Plan has, through the last couple of decades, experienced a lot of social, cultural, political, religious and ethnic tension in daily life, and it is now officially labelled as an 'especially vulnerable residential area'. In Denmark, the authorities have created a list of districts termed 'ghetto' based on observances against 5 criteria of poverty, education, share of non-Western migrants, unemployment and criminal records.

==== Crime ====
The Gellerup Plan (and the neighbourhood of Gellerup) has been known for its high crime rate and social problems and therefore a special police unit has been dedicated to the area, as well as several social projects.

At the beginning of 2007 a local Shell gas station closed down after years of problems including robberies and assaults on staff and customers.

In mid-February 2008, there was a spate of arson, with around twenty incidents of arson per day spread over the western suburbs. These included the throwing of firecrackers onto traffic from an elevated walkway, and the setting alight of dumpsters and cars. In October 2008, a local kindergarten school was intentionally burned down by a group of children, destroying an estimated kr. 7 million of property. Two families of the boys committing the crime were evicted from the Gellerup area in 2010, after two court cases.

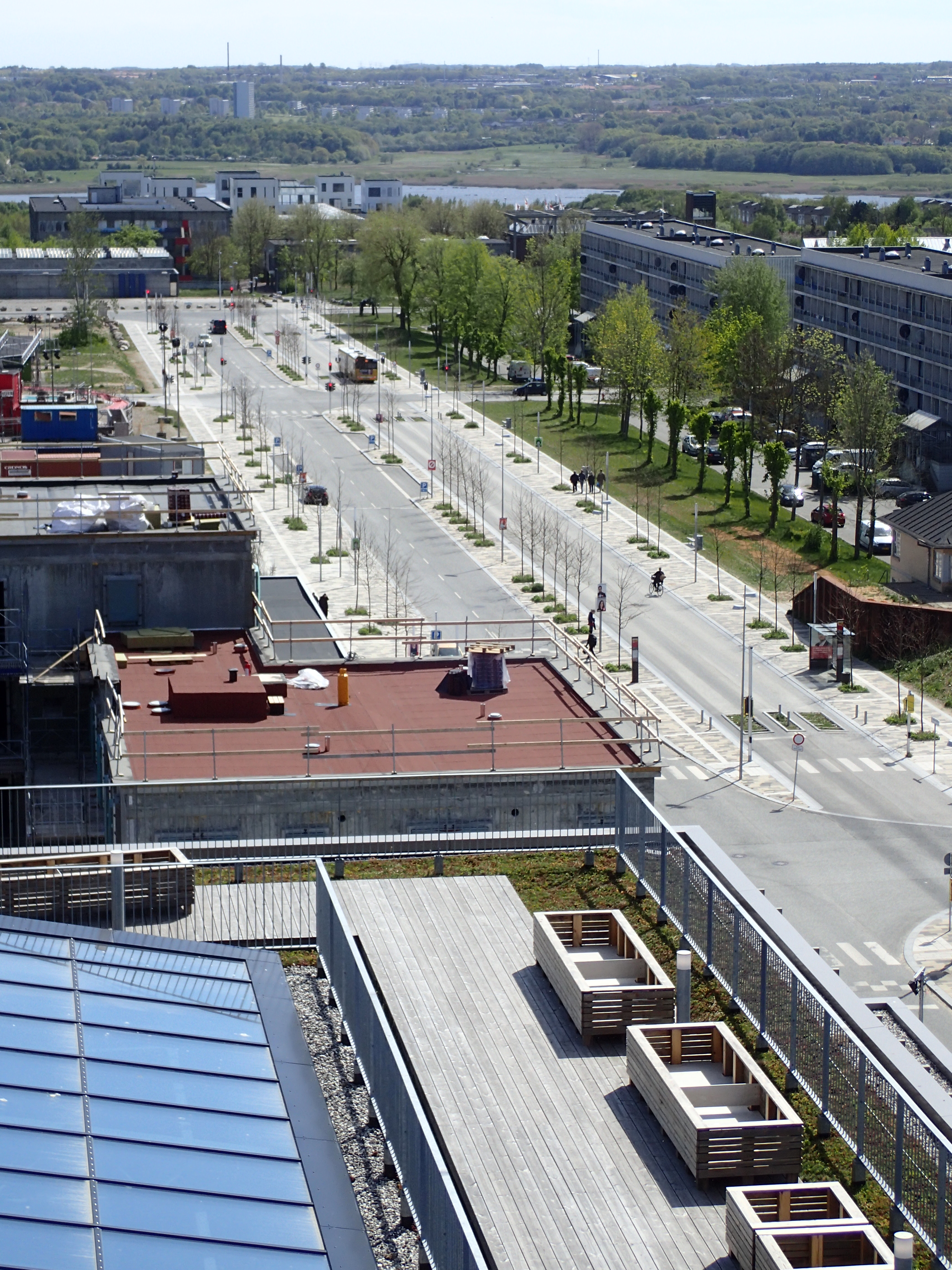
A new boulevard, as part of the Masterplan for renewal

More recent examples:

Assault and burglaries at the local dormitory Hejredal in 2011.

There was a shooting incident at Bazar Vest in January 2013.

The swimming division of AGF stopped their activities at Gellerup swimming hall for 2 weeks in April 2013, due to vandalism, harassment and attacks on employees.

==== Ghetto list ====
In 2014 the population of the Gellerupparken district fulfilled all 5 criteria for the ghetto list: 80% were either migrants or descendants of migrants from non-Western countries, 52.3% were unemployed, 4.76% had criminal records. Of the 30-59 year-olds, 57.1% had only primary education. In the 2017 update of the list, Gellerup fulfilled 4 of the 5 criteria.

As a government response to the urban decay in 2018, it was decided that nine buildings part of a public housing complex with 600 apartments were to be demolished. The inhabitants were forced to move and new homes for ownership and business properties to be built instead.

==== Regeneration ====
In 2007, the "Masterplan" (Danish: Helhedsplanen) was launched in order to reverse the social degradation. The plan aims at improving the quality of life in the area and is budgeted at kr 452+ million ($75–80 million), while 432,6 million has been realised as of 2012. The project intends to transform Gellerupparken and Toveshøj from a disadvantaged residential area to an attractive urban district.

There has been controversy over the project, especially in regards to the demolition of housing blocks and the lack of involvement of the affected residents. This includes several public protests and criticism from Brabrand Housing Cooperative.

== Transportation ==
Placed just west of the ring road Ring 2 and with expressway Silkeborgvej cutting through, Gellerup is strategically placed for transport and easy to access.

Gellerup is connected to the surrounding neighborhoods by several bus routes.
