= Gary LaFree =

American criminologist

Gary LaFree is an American sociologist and criminologist. He was a professor and Chair of the Criminology and Criminal Justice department at the University of Maryland, College Park, the Director of the Maryland Crime Research and Innovation Center (MCRIC) and the Founding Director of the National Consortium for the Study of Terrorism and Responses to Terrorism (START). His main area of expertise are the causes and consequences of interpersonal violence.

== Education ==
LaFree received his Bachelor of Arts (1973), his Master of Arts (1975) and his Doctor of Philosophy (1979) from Indiana University Bloomington.

== Career ==
Dr. LaFree was awarded the Stockholm Prize in Criminology in 2024, was appointed as a Distinguished University Professor at the University of Maryland in 2022, won the Edwin H. Sutherland Award from the American Society of Criminology in 2020 and the Gerhard O.W. Mueller Award for Distinguished Contributions to International Criminal Justice from the Academy of Criminal Justice Studies in 2016. He served as President of the American Society of Criminology in 2005 and was elected as a Fellow of the ASC in 2006.

Before joining the faculty at Maryland, Dr. LaFree served as the Chair of the Sociology and Criminology Department at the University of New Mexico for six years and as the Director of the New Mexico Criminal Justice Statistics Analysis Center for 13 years (1988-2001). Dr. LaFree was appointed by the Governor of New Mexico to chair the State Crime and Juvenile Justice Coordinating Council—a position that he filled for four years. LaFree previously taught at Indiana University (1975-1976) and the University of New Mexico (1979-2000).

== Memberships ==
LaFree is a member of the American Society of Criminology (ASC) and a past member of the National Consortium on Violence Research. He was elected as a Fellow of the American Society of Criminology in 2007. LaFree has been or is currently on the editorial boards of several scientific journals including Criminology, the Journal of Quantitative Criminology, the Journal of Research in Crime and Delinquency, the International Journal of Comparative and Applied Criminal Justice, the Journal of Criminal Law and Criminology and the International Journal of Conflict and Violence.

== Works (selection) ==
=== On violent crime ===
- Nature of Crime in America with R. Bursik, J. Short, and R. Taylor. Washington, DC: National Institute of Justice (2000).
- Losing Legitimacy: Street Crime and the Decline of Institutions in America. Boulder, CO: Westview Perseus (1998).
- Rape and Criminal Justice: The Social Construction of Sexual Assault. Belmont, CA: Wadsworth (1989).
- Educational spending and imprisonment risk: The role of schools as prison gatekeepers with Richard Arum (2009)
- Developmental victimology and the homicide victimization of infants and young children with Gwen Hunnicut (2008)
- The situational analysis of crime and deviance with Christopher Birkbeck (1993)

=== On race and crime ===
- Is the gap between black and white arrest rates narrowing? National trends for personal contact crimes, 1960 to 2002 with Robert O'Brien and Erich Baumer (2006)
- The effect of racially segregated schools on African American and white incarceration rates, 1970 to 1990 with Richard Arum (2006)
- Race and crime with Michelle Hussong (2000)
- African-American collective action and crime with Kriss Drass (1997)
- Race and crime trends in the United States, 1946‑1990 (1994)
- The argument for studying race and crime with Katheryn K. Russell (1993)

=== On terrorism ===
- Why democracy has failed to reduce terrorism in the Middle East and why protecting human rights might be more successful. With Nancy Morris and Eray Karlidag. (2020).
- Who is more violent in extremist groups? A comparison of leaders and followers. With Katarzyna Jasko (2020).
- Islamist Terrorism, Diaspora Links and Casualty Rates with James Piazza (2019).
- Religion and Support for Political Violence among Christians and Muslims in Sub-Saharan Africa with Amy Adamczyk (2019).
- Using Google and Twitter to measure, validate and understand views about religion across Africa with Amy Adamczyk and Maria Barrera Vilert (2019).
- Prison and violent political extremism in the United States with Bo Jiang and Lauren Porter (2019).
- Is Antifa a terrorist group? (2018).
- Correlates of violent political extremism in the United States with Michael Jensen, Patrick James and Aaron Safer-Lichtenstein (2018).
- Cut from the same cloth? Comparing gangs and violent political extremists with David Pyrooz, Scott Decker and Patrick James (2017).
- Countering Terrorism with Martha Crenshaw. Washington, DC: Brookings Institution (2017).
- Handbook of the Criminology of Terrorism. Edited with Joshua Freilich. New York: Wiley (2017).
- Applying Criminology Theories to Terrorism: New Applications and Approaches. Edited with Josh Freilich. Milton Park, UK: Taylor and Francis (2015).
- LaFree, Gary, Laura Dugan and Erin Miller. 2015. Putting Terrorism in Context: Insights from the Global Terrorism Database. with Laura Dugan and Erin Miller. London: Routledge (2015).
- The impact of British counter terrorist strategies on political violence in Northern Ireland: Comparing deterrence and backlash models with Laura Dugan and Raven Korte (2009)
- Build a criminal justice policy for terrorism with James Hendrickson (2007)
- Global terrorism and failed states with Laura Dugan and Susan Fahey (2007)

== See also ==
- Race and crime in the United States

== Sources ==
- Gary LaFree at the Department of Criminology and Criminal Justice of the University of Maryland.

Professional and academic associations
Preceded by Julie Horney	President of the American Society of Criminology; 2006	Succeeded by Michael Tonry
