= Institute for Interdisciplinary Research on Conflict and Violence =

German research institute

The Institute for Interdisciplinary Research on Conflict and Violence (Institut für interdisziplinäre Konflikt- und Gewaltforschung or IKG) is a central academic institute of Bielefeld University, Bielefeld, Germany.

It was founded by a resolution of the University Senate on December 18, 1996. Prof. Dr. Wilhelm Heitmeyer was appointed director. His first deputy was Prof. Dr. Rainer Dollase.

The institute was opened officially on April 16, 1997, with a symposium at the Center for Interdisciplinary Research (ZiF) on Societal Trends, Scientific Responsibility, and Violence.

== Goals ==
The work at the Institute is concentrated on theoretical and empirical analyses of both constructive and destructive conflicts and their consequences. One central focus is on the extent and causes of violence.

== Research ==
Today 30 scientists from different disciplines conduct empirical research studies at the institute. The most important activities are the longitudinal survey on group focused enmity and the DFG research training group on the same topic. There are various studies on social disintegration and conflict as well as on anti-Semitism or migration.

The institute publishes the peer-reviewed open access scientific journal International Journal of Conflict and Violence.

== Executive Board and Advisory Board ==
The Institute is managed by an interdisciplinary executive board. Members of this board are: Gerd Bohner, Heinz-Gerhard Haupt, Wilhelm Heitmeyer, Ralf Kölbel and Jost Reinecke. Additionally the Institute has an academic advisory board, which ensure the research quality and supervises the scientific work. Members of the advisory board are: Hans-Jörg Albrecht, Donatella Della Porta, Roland Eckert, Douglas Massey, Steven Messner, Sabine Andresen, Ulrich Wagner and Hans-Ulrich Wehler.

== History ==
IKG was established in 1996, and Wilhelm Heitmeyer was its founding director.
