= Geoffrey Crossick =

British academic

Geoffrey Joel Crossick MBE FRHistS (born 13 June 1946) is a British academic who is Professor of Humanities at the School of Advanced Study, a postgraduate school of the University of London. He was Vice-Chancellor of London University from 2010 to 2012.

== Early life ==
The son of Louis Crossick and Rebecca Naomi née Backen, Crossick was educated at the Haberdashers' Aske's Boys' School Elstree, before going to Gonville and Caius College, Cambridge, where he read history, graduating as a BA in 1967. He then pursued further research historical at Birkbeck College, London, where he took a PhD in 1976.

== Career ==
Elected a Research Fellow in History at Emmanuel College, Cambridge from 1970 to 1973, Crossick then became a lecturer in Social History at the University of Hull from 1973 to 1978. In 1979 he joined the University of Essex becoming a Reader then Professor of History from 1991 to 2002 before becoming Pro-Vice-Chancellor from 1997 to 2002.

Crossick was Chief Executive of the Arts and Humanities Research Board from 2002 to 2005 and Warden of Goldsmiths College from 2005 to 2010. He was Vice-Chancellor of the University of London from 2010 to 2012.

Crossick was visiting professor of the University of Lyon from 1990 to 1991. He has been a member of the Business and Community Strategy Committee, and later Enterprise and Skills Strategy Committee of the Higher Education Funding Council for England (HEFCE) from 2005 to 2012. He has been a board member of Universities UK (UUK) from 2006 to 2012 and is Director of the Arts and Humanities Research Council's Cultural Value Project. In 2014 he was appointed Chairman of the Crafts Council. He was previously a Trustee of the National Maritime Museum, at Greenwich. He was Director 2012–16 of the AHRC Cultural Value Project set up to identify the benefits of arts and culture to individuals and society and ways of evaluating and evidencing them: his report, Understanding the value of Arts and Culture (with Patrycja Kaszynska, AHRC 2016).

In 2015 Crossick published a report on Monographs and Open Access for the Higher Education Funding Council for England.

== Personal life ==
Crossick married Rita Geraldine Vaudrey JP in 1973 and they have two sons. He is a Tottenham Hotspur FC supporter.

== Publications ==
- The Lower Middle Class in Britain 1870–1914 (Editor) Publisher: Croom Helm (20 Jan 1977) ISBN 978-0856643484
- An Artisan Elite in Victorian Society: Kentish London 1840–1880 1978 (Joint editor) Publisher: C. Helm Rowman and Littlefield ISBN 978-0847660988
- Shopkeepers and Master Artisans in 19th Century Europe May 1984 (Geoffrey Crossick and Heinz-Gerhard Haupt) Publisher: Methuen young books ISBN 978-0416356601
- The Power of the Past: essays for Eric Hobsbawm September 1984 (Editors: Geoffrey Crossick, Pat Thane, and Roderick Floud) Publisher: Cambridge University Press ISBN 978-0521275279
- The Petite Bourgeoisie in Europe 1780–1914: Enterprise, Family and Independence 1995, New edition Nov 1997 (Geoffrey Crossick and Heinz-Gerhard Haupt) Publisher: Routledge ISBN 978-0415174633
- The Artisan and the European Town: 1500–1900 (Historical Urban Studies Series) June 1997 (Editor) Publisher: Ashgate Publishing Limited ISBN 978-1859282328
- Cathedrals of Consumption: the European department store 1850–1939 March 1998 (Ed: Geoffrey Crossik and Serge Gaumain) Publisher: Ashgate Publishing Limited ISBN 978-1840142365
- Knowledge Transfer without Widgets: the challenge of the creative economy January 2007 (Contributor) Publisher: Goldsmiths College ISBN 978-1904158806

== See also ==
- List of Vice-Chancellors of the University of London

Academic offices
Preceded by Sir Graeme Davies	Vice-Chancellor of the University of London; 2010–2012	Succeeded by Professor Sir Adrian Smith FRS
