= International Journal of Conflict and Violence =

Academic journal

- Discipline: Conflict- and violence-research
- Language: English
- Edited by: Andreas Zick; Steven F. Messner; Gary LaFree; Ekaterina Stepanova

Publication details
- History: 1998–present
- Publisher: Public Knowledge Project (Germany)
- Frequency: Biannually
- Impact factor: 0.578 (2014)

Standard abbreviations
- ISO 4: Int. J. Confl. Violence

Indexing
- ISSN: 1864-1385
- OCLC no.: 182639466

Links
- Journal homepage; Online access; Online archive

The International Journal of Conflict and Violence (IJCV) is an open access interdisciplinary scientific journal covering conflict and violence research. It has been published twice a year in English since 2007 and encompasses contributions from a wide range of disciplines including sociology, political science, education, social psychology, criminology, ethnology, history, political philosophy, urban studies, economics, and the study of religions.

The editors-in-chief are Andreas Zick (Bielefeld University), Steven F. Messner, (University at Albany, SUNY), Gary LaFree, (University of Maryland, College Park) and Ekaterina Stepanova (IMEMO, Russian Academy of Sciences) and is sponsored by the Institute for Interdisciplinary Research on Conflict and Violence (Institut für interdisziplinäre Konflikt- und Gewaltforschung, IKG) and the German Research Foundation (Deutsche Forschungsgemeinschaft, DFG).

== Abstracting and indexing ==
The journal is abstracted and indexed in:

- DNB
- EBSCOhost
- ISI: Social Sciences Citation Index
- ProQuest
- SCOPUS

According to the Journal Citation Reports, the journal has a 2014 impact factor of 0.578, ranking it 98th out of 161 journals in the category "Political Science" and 50th out of 85 journals in the category "International Relations".

== See also ==
- List of international relations journals
- List of political science journals
