= Jorge G. Durand =

Peruvian-born Mexican anthropologist

Jorge Guillermo Durand Arp-Nisen (born 1949 in Lima, Peru) is a research professor of anthropology at the University of Guadalajara and the Center for Economic Research and Teaching (CIDE). He is co-director with Douglas S. Massey on the Mexican Migration Project. (since 1987) and the Latin American Migration Project (since 1996), sponsored by the universities of Princeton and Guadalajara. He is a member of the American Philosophical Society, National Academy of Sciences, and the American Academy of Arts and Sciences. In Mexico, he is a member of the National System of Researchers (Level III) of the Mexican Academy of Sciences. Further, he has been granted the Guggenheim Fellowship for Social Sciences award in the Latin American & Caribbean Competition, as well as the Bronislaw Malinowski Award by the Society for Applied Anthropology.

== Academia ==
He received his bachelor's degree in Social Anthropology from the Ibero-American University in Mexico and his master's degree in Social Anthropology as well from El Colegio de México (English: The College of Mexico). Additionally, he has a PhD in Geography and Land Management from the University of Toulouse, France.

Over the last three decades Durand has been most concerned with the migration between Mexico and the United States, chiefly with co-director Douglas S. Massey on the Mexican Migration Project. With survey data gathered by the Mexican Migration Project he investigated the socioeconomic consequences of long-term Mexican migration to the United States, as well as the growth of permanent immigrant communities in the United States. The Mexican Migration Project began in 1982, where he worked with various other scientists to further their understanding of the multi-faceted process of Mexican migration to the United States. Birthed from the success of that project (also co-directed by Jorge G. Durand and Douglas S. Massey) is the Latin American Migration Project, an initiative founded in 1998 that is an extension of the MMP (Mexican Migration Project). The difference between the two is that the Latin American Migration Project broadens the scope of the multi-disciplinary study to the migration patterns of other Latin American countries.

== Career ==
=== Mexican Migration Project (1982-present) ===
Serving a large part as co-director in the Mexican Migration Project, he partially oversaw the organization of research strategies.The data collection for this project borrowed from anthropological and sociological research methods, particularly ethnosurveying (survey sampling coupled with ethnographic field work). The survey material specifically records general demographic, migratory, working/non-working, and relationship information for individual households, culminating in one of the most concise and vast datasets of Mexico-US migration in existence. Further, the Mexican Migration Project has also compiled data over the past few decades on the economics of Mexico-US migration, specifically the cost of crossing the border and even the prevalence of access to border crossing guides from dates as far back as 1965 (findable on the MMP database)

=== Latin American Migration Project (1998-present) ===
J Durand in collaboration with co-director Douglas S. Massey and other scientists from multiple disciplines conducted similar research to the Mexican Migration Project, over a wider range including several other Latin American countries including, Colombia, Costa Rica, Dominican Republic, El Salvador, Ecuador, Guatemala, Haiti, Nicaragua, Peru, and Puerto Rico. The types of findings this project have come to are the mean age that migration took place (among well over 700 migrants), mean duration of stay, mean education, and more. This database is public and available for any relevant studies that can draw more specific conclusions about Mexico-US migration.

== Written work ==
- 2019: The Annals of the American Academy of Political and Social Science: Behind the Smoke and Mirrors of U.S. Immigration Policy (co-edited with Douglas S. Massey)
  - Russel Sage; 276 pp. ISBN 978-1544389738
- 2010: Continental Divides: International Migration in the Americas (Editor)
  - Russel Sage; 324 pp. ISBN 978-1412991872
- 2008: Méxicanos en Chicago: diario de campo de Robert Redfield, 1924-1925 (with Patricia Arias)
  - Universidad de Guadalajara, Centro Universitrio de Ciencias Sociales y Humanidades. ISBN 978-6074010442
- 2004: Crossing the border: Research from the Mexican Migration Project (co-edited with Douglas S. Massey)
  - Russel Sage; 345 pp. ISBN 978-0-87154-288-5
- 2003: Beyond Smoke and Mirrors: Mexican Immigration in an Era of Economic Integration (with Douglas S. Massey and Nolan J. Malone)
  - Russel Sage; 210 pp. ISBN 978-0-87154-590-9
- 2001: Beyond Smoke and Mirrors: U.S. Immigration Policy in the Age of Globalization (with Douglas S. Massey and Nolan J. Malone)
  - Russel Sage; 216 pp. ISBN 978-0-87154-590-9
- 1995: Miracles on the Border: Retablos of Mexican Migrants to the United States (with Douglas S. Massey)
  - University of Arizona Press; 216 pp. ISBN 978-0816514977
- 1990: Return to Aztlan: The Social Process of International Migration from Western Mexico (with Douglas S. Massey, Rafael Alarcon, and Humberto Gonzalez)
  - University of California Press; 347 pp. ISBN 978-0520069701

== See also ==
- Immigration to Mexico
- Mexican Emigration
