= Ralf Kölbel =

Ralf Koelbel (born 1968) is professor of criminology, criminal law and criminal proceedings law at Bielefeld University.

== Academia ==
Koelbel heads the Chair of Criminology, Criminal Law, and Criminal Proceedings Law at the Faculty of Law. His main research aims are in the fields of white-collar crime, law of criminal procedure, basic issues of criminal law, sociology of criminal law. From 2008-2009 he heads the Chair of Criminal Law, Law of Criminal Procedure, and Criminal Policy at the Deutsche Hochschule der Polizei. He is member of the board of the Institute for interdisciplinary research on conflict and violence (Institut für interdisziplinäre Konflikt- und Gewaltforschung, IKG) at Bielefeld University and also member of the board of the Association of Law and Society. He is a member of the interdisciplinary working group Signatures of Threat.

== Research ==
- Contextual, organizational, and staff-related conditions of corporate crime, particularly in the healthcare sector (DFG, 2009-ongoing)

== Selected publications ==
- with S. Selter. 2010. Hostile Intent – the Terrorist’s Achilles Heel? Observations on Pre-Crime Surveillance by Means of Thought Recognition. European Journal of Crime, Criminal Law and Criminal Justice.
- 2008. “Cultural lag” und Normevolution: Systemtheoretische Überlegungen am Beispiel des Wirtschaftsstrafrechts [”Cultural lag” and “Norm Revolution”: Systems theory-based reflections exemplified by business criminal law]. In Rasender Stillstand. Beschleunigung des Wirklichkeitswandels, eds. K.-M. Kodalle and H. Rosa, 69–86. Würzburg: Königshausen & Neumann.
- 2008. Zur wirtschaftstrafrechtlichen Institutionalisierung des Whistleblowings. Lehren aus der Praxis des sog. „qui tam“- Verfahrens [On the business-criminal-law-based institutionalizing of whistle blowing. Lessons from the practice of the so-called “qui-tam” procedure]. Juristenzeitung 63. 1134–1141.
- 2008. Wirtschaftskriminalität und private Strafrechtsdurchsetzung [White collar crime and private enforcement of criminal law]. Monatsschrift für Kriminologie und Strafrechtsreform 91: 22–37.
- 2007. Strafrechtliche Haltung für prozessbedingte sekundäre Viktimisierung [Legal attitudes to process-induced secondary victimization]. Zeitschrift für die gesamte Strafrechtswissenschaft 119: 334–360.
- with T. Berndt, and P. Stegmaier. 2006. Abduktion in der justiziellen Entscheidungspraxis [Abduction in judicial decision-making]. Rechtstheorie 37: 85–108.
- 2006. Zur Problematik der strafprozessualen Körperhermeneutik [On the problem of criminal body hermeneutics]. Goltdammers Archiv für Strafrecht 153: 469–491.
- 2006. Selbstbelastungsfreiheiten. Der nemo-tenetur-Satz im materiellen Strafrecht [Liberties resulting from self-incrimination. The nemo-tenetur sentence in material criminal law]. Berlin: Duncker & Humblot.
- with G. Jerouschek. 2003. Folter von Staats wegen? [Torture on behalf of the state?]. Juristenzeitung 58: 613–620.
- with M. Morlok. 2000. Zur Herstellung von Recht: Forschungsstand und rechtstheoretische Implikationen ethnomethodologischer Strafrechtssoziologie [On the establishment of law: State of research and theoretical legal implications of an ethno-methodological sociology of criminal law]. Zeitschrift für Rechtssoziologie 21: 387–417.
