= Douglas Massey =

American sociologist (born 1952)

Douglas Steven Massey
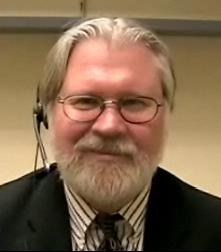
- Born: October 5, 1952 (age 74); Olympia, Washington, U.S.
- Spouse: Susan Fiske

Academic background
- Education: Western Washington University (BA); Princeton University (MA, PhD)
- Thesis: Residential Segregation of Spanish Americans in United States Urbanized Areas (1978)

Academic work
- Discipline: Sociology
- Institutions: Princeton University
- Main interests: Sociology, immigration, residential segregation

Douglas Steven Massey (born October 5, 1952) is an American sociologist. Massey is currently a professor of sociology at the Princeton School of Public and International Affairs at Princeton University and is an adjunct professor of sociology at the University of Pennsylvania.

Massey specializes in the sociology of immigration, and has written on the effect of residential segregation on the black underclass in the United States. He has been president of the Population Association of America, the American Sociological Association and the American Academy of Political and Social Science. He is a co-editor of the Annual Review of Sociology.

== Academia ==
Massey received his Bachelor of Arts in Sociology, Psychology, and Spanish, from Western Washington University in 1974. In 1977 he received a Master of Arts in Sociology from Princeton University, and a PhD in 1978. He was a Guggenheim fellow in 1990–1991.

Douglas S. Massey is the founder and co-director of the Latin American Migration Project, and the Mexican Migration Project with his long-time collaborator Jorge G. Durand. He is board member of the Institute for Interdisciplinary Research on Conflict and Violence (Institut für interdisziplinäre Konflikt und Gewaltforschung) at Bielefeld University, a past editor of the International Journal of Conflict and Violence and a co-editor of the Annual Review of Sociology.

Massey was president of the Population Association of America in 1996. He served as the 92nd president of the American Sociological Association, 2000–2001, From 2006 to 2015, he was the president of the American Academy of Political and Social Science. In 2008, he received a special recognition from the World Cultural Council.

Massey's research areas include: demography, urban sociology, race and ethnicity, international migration, and Latin American society, particularly Mexico.

== Book titles ==
- 2007: Categorically Unequal: The American Stratification System
  - Russell Sage; 340 pp. ISBN 978-0-87154-584-8
- 2007: New Faces in New Places: The New Geography of American Immigration (editor)
  - Russell Sage; 370 pp. ISBN 978-0-87154-586-2
- 2005: Return of the "L" Word: A Liberal Vision for the New Century
  - Princeton; 232 pp. ISBN 978-0-691-12303-5
- 2005: Strangers in a Strange Land: Humans in an Urbanizing World
  - W.W. Norton; 352 pp.
- 2004: Crossing the border: Research from the Mexican Migration Project (co-edited with Jorge Durand)
  - Russell Sage; 345 pp. ISBN 978-0-87154-288-5
- 2001: The Source of the River: The Origins, Aspirations, and Values of Freshmen at America's Elite Colleges and Universities (with Camille Charles, Garvey Lundy, and Mary J. Fischer)
  - Princeton; 304 pp. ISBN 978-0-691-11326-5
- 2001: Beyond Smoke and Mirrors: U.S. Immigration Policy in the Age of Globalization (with Jorge Durand and Nolan Malone)
  - Russell Sage; 216 pp. ISBN 978-0-87154-590-9
- 2001: Problem of the Century: Racial Stratification in the United States at Century's End (co-edited with Elijah Anderson)
  - Russell Sage; 470 pp. ISBN 978-0-87154-054-6
- 1998: Worlds in Motion: International Migration at the End of the Millennium (with Joaquín Arango, Graeme Hugo, Ali Kouaouci, Adela Pellegrino, and J. Edward Taylor)
  - Oxford; 362 pp.
- 1993: American Apartheid: Segregation and the Making of the Underclass (with Nancy A. Denton)
  - Harvard; 304 pp. ISBN 978-0-674-01820-4
- 1987: Return to Aztlan: The Social Process of International Migration from Western Mexico (with Rafael Alarcón, Jorge Durand, Humberto González)
  - University of California; 354 pp.

== Journal articles ==
- Massey, Douglas S. (2000). "What I Don't Know About My Field but Wish I Did". Annual Review of Sociology. 26 (1). Annual Reviews: 699–701. doi:10.1146/annurev.soc.26.1.699.
- Massey, Douglas S. (1981). "Dimensions of the New Immigration to the United States and the Prospects for Assimilation". Annual Review of Sociology. 7 (1). Annual Reviews: 57–85. doi:10.1146/annurev.so.07.080181.000421. PMID 12312457.
