= Asmaa Abdol-Hamid =

Emirati-born Danish social worker and politician (born 1981)

Asmaa Abdol-Hamid (Arabic: أسماء عبد الحميد; born November 22, 1981) is an Emirati-born Danish social worker and former politician living in Odense.

== Family background ==
Abdol-Hamid is one of seven children. She was born in the United Arab Emirates to parents of Palestinian descent. Her father grew up in a Lebanese refugee camp. Her mother's family also lived in Lebanon, but moved to Saudi Arabia for a few years. In the 1970s, her parents moved to the United Arab Emirates before they contacted Dansk Flygtningehjælp during the mid-1980s, due to the police's harassment. The family was granted political asylum in Denmark, moving to Genner, Southern Jutland.

== Childhood ==
She and her family are practicing Muslims. When she was 14 the family moved to Rødekro, and then in 1998 they moved to Vollsmose, Odense, to give the children more opportunities for higher education.

In 2004, she graduated with a degree in social worker from Odense University College of Lillebaelt and worked as family coordinator in Roskilde. She also started a successful girl's club. She is now working in Vollsmose.

Asmaa Abdol-Hamid was the first hijab-clad television host in Denmark and got elected as a deputy in the Danish Parliament, and she is the first woman with a scarf to attend the Danish City Council in Denmark.

== Political career ==
In high school Abdol-Hamid joined Social Democratic Youth of Denmark.

In 2005 she was elected as deputy member of the Odense city council for the Red-Green Alliance. She then first came to media attention when she refused to shake a male colleague's hand, instead putting her hand on her heart in greeting.

She served as spokesperson for the eleven Muslim organizations who filed a complaint with the police after the Jyllands-Posten Muhammad cartoons controversy, contending that Jyllands-Posten should be criminally prosecuted for publishing editorial cartoons depicting the Islamic prophet Muhammad. After a two-month investigation the Regional Public Prosecutor concluded that no apparent violation of Danish law had been committed that would trump the publishers' right to free speech.

In 2006, Abdol-Hamid hosted a TV show "Adam og Asmaa" together with Adam Holm. The show caused much debate since it was the first time a TV host in Denmark wore a hijab. The Danish feminist group Feminist Forum said her appearance "strengthens ethnic and gender equality in Denmark" but the Women for Freedom association said, "The choice of Asma Abdol-Hamid (sic) ... is an insult to both Danish and Muslim women."

In 2007, she announced her plans to run for the Folketing, gaining the candidacy for a Copenhagen seat for the Red-Green Alliance. She is listed seventh on the party's parliamentary candidate list. Her candidacy caused debate in Denmark over the fact that she intends to serve wearing a hijab. She also received support from some imams during the elections. Although she was not elected, she may still appear in the parliament as a substitute for Johanne Schmidt-Nielsen. Pia Kjærsgaard, leader of the Danish People's Party, threatened that "we" would throw Asmaa out of the Folketing if she were to stand at the pulpit and open a speech with an invocation to God.

== Views ==
- Headscarf – "Wearing a headscarf does not mean that I’m oppressed or deprived. The values on which I live my life are Islamic and not Arab. It is important to make a distinction between religion and culture. In many respects, the Arab way of thinking discriminates against women; even though I am an Arab, I don’t make my choices on a cultural basis, but in the light of my religion."
- Integration – "I don’t like the word ‘integration’. Everyone uses the word without being able to make any clear-cut definition. Ethnic minorities are not a problem in themselves; when identifying reasons for the lack of integration in Denmark, I prefer to talk about social classes and look at people’s class background rather than their ethnic identity."
- War in Iraq – In July 2007, Asmaa Abdol-Hamid told tabloid newspaper B.T. that she supports the Iraqi resistance movement against the occupation forces and that "they have the right to live in a country where they can make their own decisions". In a reaction to the controversy which her interview started, she maintains her support for the Iraqi resistance, and compares it to the Danish resistance movement against the German occupation during Second World War. She thinks resistance against a foreign occupation is not only legitimate but a human right. In response to her remarks Naser Khader, a fellow Muslim Dane, stated that Abdol-Hamid spoke so much nonsense and contradicted herself so often that one "gets completely dizzy." Khader pointed out that the Iraqi government had been freely elected by the Iraqi people and been recognized by the United Nations, concluding that Abdol-Hamid was "not to be taken seriously politically."
- Poverty – Abdol-Hamid, who herself shared a one room flat with her six sisters in the ghetto of Vollsmose, in the town of Odense, says her mission is to fight for the underclass, and the Danes in "deep poverty".

== See also ==
- Red-Green Alliance
