= Nancy Denton =

American sociologist

- Education: LeMoyne College (B.A., 1971); Fordham University (M.A., 1973); University of Pennsylvania (M.A., 1977; Ph.D., 1984)
- Scientific career
- Fields: Sociology
- Institutions: University at Albany, SUNY
- Thesis: Factors influencing young women's transitions among multiple role combinations: U.S. 1968-73 (1984)

Nancy Anne Denton is an American sociologist. She is a professor of sociology at the University at Albany, SUNY, where she professor emeritus. Denton is known for her research on racial segregation in the United States with Douglas Massey, with whom she co-authored the book American Apartheid. A book, well reviewed by the Los Angeles Times, when first published. Upon retiring from SUNY Albany, she received the Robert and Helen Lynd Lifetime Achievement Award from the Community and Urban Sociology section from the American Sociological Association Works at Stanford Center on Poverty & Inequality
