= Vollsmose =

Suburb of Odense, Denmark

Coordinates: 55°24′30″N 10°26′00″E

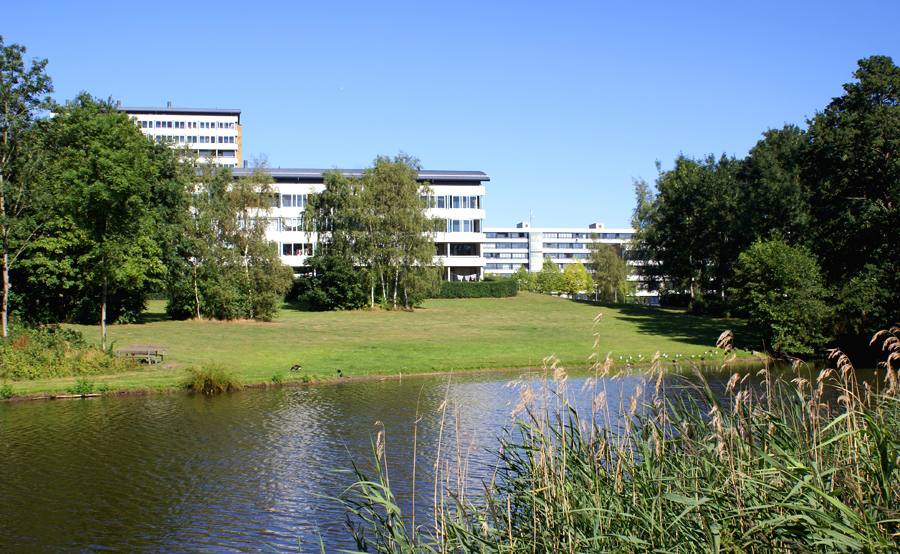
Vollsmose housing

Vollsmose is a suburb of Odense, the third-largest city in Denmark. Approximately 3 km northeast of central Odense, towards Odense Fjord. It has around 10.000 inhabitants and is characterised by a modern housing development project from the 1970s.

Since the 1990s, the area has become known throughout Denmark, because of the relatively large numbers of people of foreign descent living in the area. Its many social issues cause it to be officially classified as a vulnerable residential area by Danish authorities.

== Etymology ==
According to a markbog (listing and map of the area's fields) of 1682, the spelling used then was Woldsmose.

The latter part of the name is Danish mose (bog or swamp). The first part is probably vold (Old Norse vǫllr), an obsolete word meaning a grass-covered area or plain. Before being developed, the area was low and marshy. Another possibility is the identical word vold meaning rampart (from Low German wal and Latin vallum), but there are no traces of such a fortification in the area.

On maps from the 18th century the name Wolfs Mose occurs (literally, 'bog of wolves'). These maps wore often edited by foreign cartographers and have many erratic German-influenced spelling forms.

=== Jocular meaning ===
A third identical word vold simply means violence in Danish (a common Germanic word, same as Old English geweald, German Gewalt). As the forms Vollsmose and Voldsmose would be pronounced in the same way in Danish, the name is easy to joke about or associate to violence. This is, however, no joke, as the official name in 1999 according to the Royal Library's registration was Danmark, Fyn, Voldsmose. Vollmose has had much media focus and political attention regarding crime, unemployment and immigration problems in recent years.

=== Spelling discussion ===
According to some, the original spelling of the name was Voldsmose, however, when the city of Odense planned to build up the area from around 1964, the project plan was presented with the spelling Vollsmose.

As of today, the Danish Placename Board lists the approved form Vollsmose.

In a piece apparently from Fyens Stiftstidende in 1999, it is claimed that the original name of the place was Voldsmose. This would allegedly still have been the officially approved spelling by 1999, but Vollsmose would have been a corrupt spelling introduced by the city of Odense since 1964 and commonly used since then.

== Description ==
Vollsmose has relatively large areas of recreational nature, grassy areas, small hills, trees and bushes, marsh areas, ponds and along Odense Å. On all four sides of the "Firkanten" ("four sides") there are two-laned roads. One side will in 2014 become used more, when a new bridge over the Odense Canal will open.

At Fyrreparken (one of the nine "parks" and "gardens" or divisions) there is an earlier peat bog, which has been dug out in such a way, that one can walk down the spiral along the walls of the hole to the bottom.

There are six parks: Birkeparken (the Birchpark), Bøgeparken (the Beechpark), Egeparken (the Oakpark), Fyrreparken (the Pinepark), Granparken (the Sprucepark) and Lærkeparken (the Larchpark), and three "gardens"; Tjørnehaven (the Hawthorn garden), Slåenhaven (the Sloe bush garden) and Hybenhaven (the Dog Rose garden).

While the area's "parks" are made up of multi-storied apartment blocks of varying heights up to 13 stories, the three "gardens" are 1–2-storied rows of housing units. Bøgeparken is the largest park with about 450 apartments and 1,600 occupants. In all there are 3,500 apartments in Vollsmose, which are owned by three of Odenses housing organisations, Højstrup Boligforening, Odense Andels Boligforening and Fyns Almennyttige Boligselskab.

There are around 10.000 inhabitants in Vollsmose. About 70% of the inhabitants are immigrants or children of immigrants, and nearly all the students at the two schools in the area, Abildgårdskole and H. C. Andersen Skole, have parents with immigrant backgrounds. There are almost 80 nationalities. The largest groups come from Lebanon, Somalia, Iraq and Turkey, coming as migrant workers in the 1960s and 1970s or as political- or war-refugees. There are many Muslims in Vollsmose, and there is a mosque in Birkeparken. People make do with other rooms.

Vollsmose's residents are, on average, younger than in Odense. Over half are under 25 years of age.

The average income in 2012 was 175,000 DKK, which is dramatically less than the average in Odense (262,000 DKK). There is a high rate of unemployment in Vollsmose compared to the rest of Odense.

In the area there is the architecturally modern Vollsmose Kirke (Vollsmose Church) built in 1975 and two public schools. A third was recently closed. There are also twelve children's institutions, a high school and shopping centre with a good library and meeting centre, and a public swimming pool. Beside the centre is a newly opened centre for youth education. There is a large playground with chickens, rabbits and sheep called Børnebyen (The Children's Town). Vollsmose has a local police station, which no other suburb in Odense has.

== History ==
The history of Vollsmose began in the 1960s and was originally a prestige project for the public service sector, which today is reflected in the high quality of the construction. Vollsmose was pictured to the citizens of Odense by the prospect of good apartments, which low income families could afford. Construction of ordinary houses also began to boom. Construction along Åssumvej was finished in the beginning of the 1970s. Construction along Vollsmose Allé was finished in 1982.

In 2006 the suburb made headlines on national newspapers when seven individuals living there were arrested and charged for planning allegedly terrorist actions.

In 2007 the suburb got its first candidate to national elections, when the former residents association chairperson and public figure from Bøgeparken, Asmaa Abdol-Hamid, stood for the leftist Enhedslisten.

In 2010 an ethnic conflict broke out in the area, where according to police Somali and Palestinians would attack ethnic Danes or set fire to their parked cars.

The suburb is classified by the government as a "vulnerable residential area" in the December 1, 2022 edition of vulnerable areas. In 2022, 77% of the inhabitants were non-Western immigrants and their descendants. 46% of the inhabitants aged 18 to 64 were not working or enrolled in an educational institution.

Odense municipality reconstructs the district with residential participation since 2001. This is known as Odense municipality's special Vollsmose efforts or Helhedsplanen, "the holistic plan".

== Initiatives ==
In 2000 the Odense town council passed a Helhedsplan for the area, in order to mend the basic problem areas, and in 2001, together with the Social Ministry, began a so-called quarter-lift-project in Vollsmose. One part of the plan was that the municipality implement the Vollsmosesekretariat, the first group of employed people to oversee operations.

The Odense municipality has placed its grants and payments centre and a health centre in Egeparken. The health centre is run in cooperation with Professor Morten Sodemann's immigrant-medical clinic at Odense Universitetshospital.

== Media ==
Vollsmose has a tradition of having its own media. Earlier, each park had their own little paper. With the Helhedsplan, the suburb has gotten its own local paper, Vollsmose Avisen. As of August 2010, the editor of Vollsmose Avisen is Thomas Juhl Bruun. The paper comes out every other week and is delivered to the residents, in Vollsmose and in areas not too far away from the place. Vollsmose also has its own homepage, www.vollsmose.dk, which includes a net.tv section.

Vollsmose Avisen and vollsmose.dk, as well as Vollsmose Net.tv, all come under Medierhus (Mediahouse) Vollsmose, which is a project under the Helhedsplan. The Medierhus lies in the Vollsmose Kulturhus (Culturehouse, meeting centre), which lies over Vollsmose Bibliotek (Library) in the Vollsmose Torve (marketplace (shopping centre)). All three media departments use residents as journalists, who voluntarily produce both articles for the homepage and the paper as well as for the net-TV.

The leader of the Medierhus was Benthe Vestergård, who was also the public relations officer for Vollsmose, but who has the job right now is unknown, as the next round of the Helhedsplan is just beginning (July 2012), with new staff and new plans, but which again this time will be called Vollsmosesekretariatet.

== Sources ==
- Website
