= Sensitive urban zone =

Term for urban areas in France with social problems

A sensitive urban zone (French: Zone urbaine sensible, ZUS) is an urban area in France defined by the authorities to be a high-priority target for city policy, taking into consideration local circumstances related to the problems of its residents.

On the 26th of December 1996, 750 ZUS were founded by the décret n°96-1156. The 751th ZUS «Nouveau Mons» in Mons-en-Baroeul was founded on the 24th of August 2000 by the décret n°2000- 796. On the 31st of July 2001, the décret n°2001-707 has changed the périmeter of Grigny's ZUS.

There are 751 sensitive urban zones in France, including 718 in mainland France. The government has published the list of zones and maps of each one.

== Social problems within the zones ==
Nearly five million people live in zones of difficulty with many problems:

- A high percentage of public housing, with little home ownership.
- High unemployment.
- A low percentage of high-school graduates.

== Government policy ==
A law passed November 14, 1996 created sensitive urban zones (ZUS) and urban tax-free zones (ZFU). 752 of these zones were created in France, including 718 in mainland France. The law of November 14, 1996 (which implements a renewed urban policy) distinguishes three levels of intervention:

- Sensitive urban zones (Zones urbaines sensibles, ZUS)
- Urban renewal zones (Zones de redynamisation urbaine, ZRU)
- Urban tax-free zones (Zones franches urbaines, ZFU)

The three levels of intervention (ZUS, ZRU and ZFU), characterized by fiscal and social measures of increasing importance, target the difficulties encountered in these districts with differing degrees of response. Contrary to generally accepted ideas, these sensitive districts are in the center of cities and not just the outskirts.

The situation in these areas in difficulty was (until recently) difficult to evaluate precisely, based on many statistics which were inadequate in certain areas, scattered or badly collected. To remedy these problems and more accurately measure the effect of policy implementation, the National Observatory of Sensitive Urban Zones (ZUS) was created in a law passed on August 1, 2003.

These ZUS are distributed throughout 490 communes and include 4.7 million inhabitants. Among them a subset of 416 zones of urban renewal (ZRU) was created, including 396 in mainland France. The ZRU contain 3.2 million inhabitants, and present unique challenges. Almost all departments are affected; the only exceptions are nine strongly agricultural departments.

== "No-go zones" ==
In 2010, Raphaël Stainville of French newspaper Le Figaro called certain neighborhoods of the southern city Perpignan "veritable lawless zones", saying they had become too dangerous to travel in at night. He added that the same was true in parts of Béziers and Nîmes. In 2012, Gilles Demailly, the mayor of the French city Amiens, in the wake of several riots, called the northern part of his city a lawless zone, where one could no longer order a pizza or call for a doctor. The head of a local association said institutional violence had contributed to the tensions resulting in the no-go zone. In 2014, Fabrice Balanche, a scholar of the Middle East, labelled the northern city of Roubaix, as well as parts of Marseille, "mini-Islamic states", saying that the authority of the state is completely absent there. In 2005 France's domestic intelligence network, the Renseignements Generaux, identified 150 "no-go zones" around the country where police would not enter without reinforcements. Christopher Dickey, writing in Newsweek, claimed the situation had arisen due to racism towards immigrants.

=== January 2015 controversy ===
In January 2015, after the Charlie Hebdo shooting, several items on Fox News labeled the ZUS as "Islamic no-go zones". French media agencies denied these claims. After complaints Fox News issued an apology, saying that there was "no credible information to support the assertion there are specific areas in these countries that exclude individuals based solely on their religion." A couple days later, Anderson Cooper on CNN issued an apology as well.

== See also ==
- Vulnerable residential area - a similar classification for areas in Denmark
- Sozialer Brennpunkt - a similar classification for areas in Germany
- Vulnerable area - a similar classification for areas in Sweden
- Crime in France
- Banlieue
