= Vulnerable residential area =

Districts in Denmark

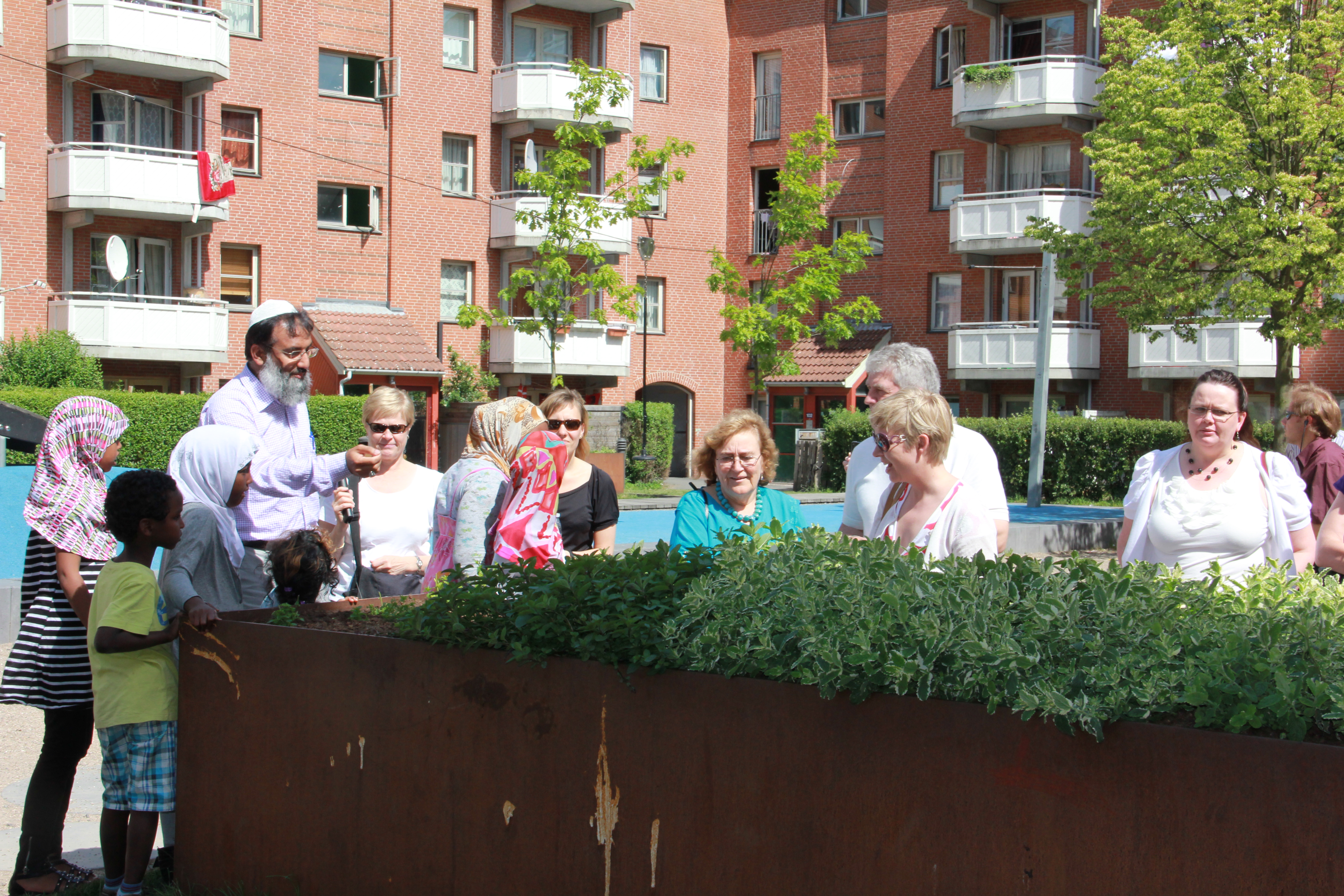
Residents at Mjølnerparken in Copenhagen taking part in a project to plant fruit bushes and herbs in 2011. Mjølnerparken was formerly classified as a vulnerable residential area, but was removed from the list in 2023.

"Vulnerable residential area" (Danish: Udsat boligområde) is an official term for a social housing district in Denmark which fulfils certain statistical criteria of relatively low employment/school attendance, relatively low income, a relatively low educational level and/or relatively many convicted inhabitants. If more than 50% of the residents in a vulnerable area are non-Western immigrants and their descendants, the area is additionally designated a "parallel society". The Danish government has published an official list of vulnerable residential areas annually since 2010, with changes in the definition and/or terminology in 2013, 2018 and 2021. During the period 2010–2021, the term "ghetto" was used officially to designate some or all of the vulnerable areas, but the term was considered controversial and removed in 2021.

== History ==
=== Background ===
Denmark experienced considerable net immigration from the 1960s onwards due to a combination of various reasons, of which labour migration, granting of political asylum to refugees and family reunification were the major ones. Many of the immigrants came from non-Western countries, and the issue of integration of the immigrants and their descendants into Danish society became an increasingly prominent political issue from the 1990s onward. Most immigrants settled in the metropolitan area of Copenhagen and other major Danish cities, in particular in residential areas in the widespread Danish non-profit social housing sector. These areas became characterized by various social problems like low income and high unemployment, and several government initiatives have been taken over the years to further integration and counter urban decay in these neighbourhoods. Major plans to this end were presented in 1994 and 2000 by the governments of Poul Nyrup Rasmussen, in 2004 by the Anders Fogh Rasmussen I Cabinet, in 2010 by the Lars Løkke Rasmussen I Cabinet, in 2013 by the Helle Thorning-Schmidt I Cabinet, in 2018 by the Lars Løkke Rasmussen III Cabinet, and in 2021 by the Mette Frederiksen I Cabinet.

=== Official listing ===
In 2010, an official list of vulnerable social housing residential areas meeting certain statistical criteria was introduced and accompanied by various measures concerning the neighbourhoods in question. The list has been updated annually since 2010, and its underlying definition(s) have been changed and refined in 2013, 2018, and 2021. Also the terminology concerning the vulnerable areas has been changed repeatedly.

=== The term "ghetto" ===
During the 1990s and 2000s, the term "ghetto" was increasingly used informally in the Danish debate on neighbourhoods with a large proportion of refugees and other immigrants, in particular in the suburbs west of Copenhagen. In 2010, the government explicitly used the term in its plan, and it was used in the law change of the same year, stating that a "ghetto" in this sense was a social housing neighbourhood fulfilling two out of three criteria: 1) more than 40% of the inhabitants aged 18–64 being neither employed nor taking an education, 2) more than 2.7% of the inhabitants aged 18 or more having been convicted of a crime, or 3) a share of more than 50% of non-Western immigrants and their descendants. The term was used legally with a somewhat changing definition until 2021. In 2013, two additional criteria were added (relatively low income and low average educational level, after which an areas was designated a ghetto if it fulfilled three of the five criteria. In 2018, the details of the criteria were changed, and an official distinction was made between "vulnerable residential areas" and "ghettos": Henceforth, officially a vulnerable residential area was a social housing area fulfilling two of four criteria concerning relatively low employment/school attendance, relatively low income, relatively many convicted inhabitants and a relatively low educational level. A vulnerable residential area defined in this way was additionally named a ghetto if the majority of its inhabitants were non-Western immigrants or descendants.

The term "ghetto" was controversial, however, inhabitants feeling stigmatized by the wording and researchers pointing out that the areas in question were typically inhabited by 20-40 different ethnic minorities, hence being diametrically opposed to the ethnic homogeneity of the original ghettos, so that multi-ethnic residential areas would be a more appropriate term. After 2018, when the term was reserved exclusively for areas having a majority share of non-Western immigrants and their descendants, the designation has also been criticized as racially discriminatory as neighborhoods with similar social problems where the residents are not of foreign origin are not subjected to the same sanctions.

After a change of government, the newly appointed minister of housing Kaare Dybvad said in July 2019 that official use of the word "ghetto" in reference to marginalised areas is "derogatory", and he wanted to put an end to political use of the word in order to avoid stigmatising the areas. In a 2021 reform, the name was finally removed.

=== Developments in the neighbourhoods ===
Since 2018, the number of vulnerable residential areas according to the official statistical definition has been more than halved, from 43 areas in 2018 to 17 areas in 2022. Parallel to this, the number of what is today officially designated "parallel societies" has declined from 29 areas in 2018 to 10 areas in 2022.

== Criteria ==
=== Non-Western determination ===
The Danish government classifies all 27 EU-member countries, alongside Andorra, Iceland, Liechtenstein, Monaco, Norway, San Marino, Switzerland, Vatican City, Canada, the United States, the United Kingdom, Australia and New Zealand as "Western countries". All other countries are classified as "Non-western countries". The Danish government only classifies someone as a "Person of Danish origin" if at least one of their parents were Danish citizens born in Denmark. All other people are classified as "Immigrant" or "Descendant [of immigrant]".

On December 18, 2025, the Court of Justice of the European Union issued a press release stating that the ethnic criteria broke European Union laws, and issued recommendations for Danish courts on how to handle the situation in the future.

=== Proclamation Requirements ===
After the changes made in 2021, a vulnerable residential area ("udsat boligområde") is defined as a social housing area with at least 1,000 residents that fulfil at least two of the following four criteria:

- The share of inhabitants aged 18–64 neither in employment nor education is higher than 40%, as an average over last 2 years.
- The share of inhabitants convicted for infractions against the penal law, weapons law or drug regulations is more than three times as high as the national average, as an average over last 2 years.
- The share of inhabitants aged 30–59 with only primary education is greater than 60%.
- The average gross income for inhabitants aged 15–64 excluding those in education is less than 55% of the average gross income for the region in question.

If the share of immigrants or descendants of immigrants from non-Western countries in a vulnerable residential area is higher than 50%, the area is officially proclaimed a "parallel society" (parallelsamfund). A residential area that has been named as a parallel society for five consecutive years is proclaimed a redevelopment area (omdannelsesområde).

In addition to vulnerable residential areas, from 2021 a list of prevention areas ("forebyggelsesområder") is maintained and published by the government. A prevention area is a social housing area with at least 1,000 residents which does not fulfil the criteria for a vulnerable residential area, but has a share of non-Western immigrants and descendants of more than 30% and which additionally fulfils at least two of the following four criteria:

- The share of inhabitants aged 18–64 neither in employment nor education is higher than 30%, as an average over last 2 years.
- The share of inhabitants convicted for infractions against the penal law, weapons law or drug regulations is more than twice as high as the national average, as an average over last 2 years.
- The share of inhabitants aged 30–59 with only primary education is greater than 60%.
- The average gross income for inhabitants aged 15–64 excluding those in education is less than 65% of the average gross income for the region in question.

== Consequences ==
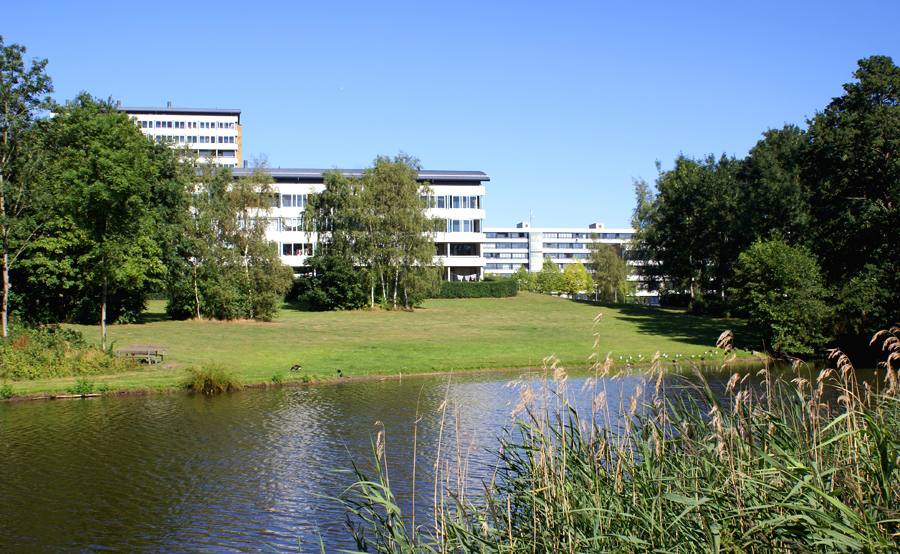
Housing in Vollsmose, Odense - a vulnerable area which is also classified as a redevelopment area.

Special housing and education measures are imposed in the residential areas on the various lists.

=== Housing ===
In 2018 it was decided that the share of social housing in redevelopment areas (at the time designated as "hard ghettos") would be reduced to a maximum of 40%. To achieve this end, some social housing blocks will be emptied and converted into private and co-operative housing, whereas others will be demolished. Most frequently, however, new private residential buildings will be erected in the areas.

Individuals receiving certain social welfare benefits face restrictions on moving to redevelopment areas. The same is true for people convicted of crime, and entire families can be evicted if one member is convicted of a crime.

All meetings of housing associations are to be held in Danish, even if some housing association board members may not speak the language.

==== Demolition ====
For redevelopment areas (see five year rule above), social housing must be reduced by 60%. Danmarks Radio notes that this can be achieved by demolition.

In 2023, a plan was announced to demolish parts of Vejlby Parish (close to Aarhus), to ensure that it didn't get classified as vulnerable.

In February 2023, the government approved plans to demolish parts of Bispehaven. The director of the board that owns the building claims that it would be scheduled for demolition even if it weren't on the list of vulnerable areas.

=== Education ===
Before children in vulnerable areas start school, they will undergo a Danish language test and be offered language training before the school starts. All children who are at least one year old and living in a vulnerable residential area are required to attend preschool for at least 25 hours per week in order to receive education in the Danish language and Danish traditions and norms, if the parents do not choose to take care of a similar instruction themselves. If the parents refuse to comply, they may forfeit receiving the normal Danish child benefit.

== Legal Issues ==
Residents of housing areas deemed "parallel societies" took the Danish government to court over the issue of forced evictions. In February 2025, the European Court of Justice’s advocate general supported the plaintiffs’ argument that the parallel society designation was “direct discrimination based on ethnicity,” but a final decision by the court is pending.

== See also ==
- Sensitive urban zone - a similar classification for areas in France
- Sozialer Brennpunkt - a similar classification for areas in Germany
- Vulnerable area - a similar classification for areas in Sweden
- Crime in Denmark
