= Wolfgang Stroebe =

German social psychologist

Ernst Joachim Wolfgang Stroebe (born 5 May 1941) is a German social psychologist and Emeritus Professor of Social Psychology at the Utrecht University and now visiting professor at the University of Groningen, particularly known for his work on social and health psychology.

== Biography ==
Born in Pforzheim, Germany, Stroebe obtained his MA in psychology at the University of Tübingen in 1964, and his Doctor of Philosophy from the University of Münster in 1966 with the thesis, entitled "Eine experimentelle und theoretische Untersuchung des Volumen‑Gewicht‑Effektes" (An experimental and theoretical study of the Size-Weight-Effect). In 1968 he obtained another PhD at the London School of Economics with the thesis, entitled "An experimental and theoretical study of social judgement."

After his graduation in London Stroebe started his academic career as Assistant Professor of Psychology at the University of North Carolina at Chapel Hill in 1968. In 1970 he returned to England and was a Postdoctoral Fellow at the University of Bristol, England for a year, 1970–71, and a lecturer in Social Psychology at the University of Sussex for another year. He left that position for one year as visiting associate professor at the University of Massachusetts (Amherst).In 1973 he went back to Germany, where he was appointed Professor at the University of Marburg. In 1979 he moved to the University of Tübingen, where he was Professor until 1992, chairperson of the Department of Psychology from 1980 to 1987, and Dean of the Faculty of Social Sciences in 1991–92. In between he was Visiting Professor at the University of Massachusetts in 1987–88. From 1981 to 1983, he served as president of the European Association of Experimental Social Psychology.

In 1992 Stroebe went to the Netherlands, where he was appointed Professor of Social and Organizational Psychology at the Utrecht University, between 2006 and 2011 Honorary Professor of Social Psychology, and Professor Emeritus since 2011. From 1992 to 1995 he also chaired its Department of Social and Organizational Psychology, and from 2000 to 2005 he was founding scientific director of a national Research Institute "Psychology & Health." In 2011 he became Visiting Professor at the University of Groningen. During his career, Stroebe received many awards, e.g., an honorary doctorate from the University of Louvain (Belgium) in 2002, the Tajfel life-time achievement award of the European Association of Social Psychology in 2005, the lifetime achievement award of the German Psychological Association in 2010. He was also made a Knight of the Royal Order of the Netherlandsche Lieuw. In 2014, he became a member of the German National Academy of Science (Leopoldina).

== Selected publications ==
- Eiser, J.R., & Stroebe, W. Categorization and social judgment. London: Academic Press, 1972
- Stroebe, Wolfgang, and Margaret S. Stroebe. Bereavement and health: The psychological and physical consequences of partner loss. Cambridge University Press, 1987.
- Stroebe, Wolfgang. Social psychology and health (3rd ed.). McGraw-Hill International, 2011.
- Stroebe, W. 'Dieting, overweight and obesity: Self-regulation in a food-rich environment" Washington: American Psychological Association, 2008.
- Fennis, B.M. & Stroebe, W. The Psychology of Advertising (3rd.ed). London: Routledge, 2021
- Hewstone, M. & Stroebe W. (Eds.). Introduction to social psychology (7th ed.). Hboken, N.J: Wiley

Articles, a selection

- Diehl, Michael, and Wolfgang Stroebe (1987). "Productivity loss in brainstorming groups: Toward the solution of a riddle." Journal of Personality and Social Psychology 53.497.
- Stroebe, W. & Frey, B.S. (1982). Self interest and collective action: The economics and psychology of public goods. British Journal of Social Psychology, 21, 121.
- Stroebe, W., Stroebe, M., Abakoumkin, G. & Schut, H. (1996). The role of loneliness and social support in adjustment to loss: A test of attachment versus stress theory. Journal of Personality and Social Psychology, 70, 1241 1249.
- Stroebe, Margaret, Henk Schut, and Wolfgang Stroebe. "Health outcomes of bereavement." The Lancet 370.9603 (2007): 1960–1973.
- Nijstad, B., & Stroebe, W. (2006). How the group affects the mind: A cognitive model of idea generation in groups. Personality and Social Psychology Review, 10, 186–213.
- Stroebe, W. & Strack, F. (2014). The alleged crisis and the illusion of exact replication. Perspectives on Psychological Science, 9, 59–71.
- Stroebe, W., van Koningsbruggen, G.M., Papies, E.K. & Aarts, H. (2013). Why most dieters fail but some succeed: A goal conflict model of eating behavior. Psychological Review, 130, 110-138
- Stroebe, W., Leander, N.P. & Kruglanski, A. (2017). Is It a Dangerous World Out There? The Motivational Bases of American Gun Ownership. Personality and Social Psychology Bulletin, 43, 1–15.
- Stroebe, W. (2019). What can we learn from Many Labs replications? Basic and Applied Social Psychology, 41, 91–103.
- Stroebe, W. (2020). Student evaluations of teaching encourages poor teaching and contributes to grade inflation: A theoretical and empirical analysis. Basic and Applied Social Psychology, 42, 276–294.
