= Journal of Research in Crime and Delinquency =

Journal of Research In Crime And Delinquency
- Discipline: Criminology
- Language: English
- Edited by: Jean McGloin, Christopher J Sullivan

Publication details
- History: 1964-present
- Publisher: SAGE Publications
- Frequency: Quarterly
- Impact factor: 2.889 (2017)

Standard abbreviations
- ISO 4: J. Res. Crime Delinq.

Indexing
- ISSN: 0022-4278 (print); 1552-731X (web)
- LCCN: 64009395
- OCLC no.: 1783073

Links
- Journal homepage; Online access; Online archive

Journal of Research in Crime and Delinquency is a peer-reviewed academic journal that publishes papers in the field of Criminology. The journal's editors are Jean McGloin (University of Maryland) and Chris Sullivan (University of Missouri–St. Louis). It has been in publication since 1964 and is currently published by SAGE Publications.

== Scope ==
Journal of Research in Crime and Delinquency (JRCD) publishes articles, research notes and review essays within the criminal justice field. The journal provides an international forum for exploring the social, political and economic contexts of criminal justice and the discussion and dissemination of research and studies within the field.

== Abstracting and indexing ==
Journal of Research in Crime and Delinquency is abstracted and indexed in, among other databases: SCOPUS, and the Social Sciences Citation Index. According to the Journal Citation Reports, its 2017 impact factor is 2.889, ranking it 7 out of 61 journals in the category 'Criminology & Penology'.
