= Constance Heitmeyer =

Constance Heitmeyer from the United States Naval Research Laboratory, Washington, DC was named Fellow of the Institute of Electrical and Electronics Engineers (IEEE) in 2015 for "contributions to formal methods for modeling and analyzing software and systems".
