= Sabine Andresen =

German educational scientist

Sabine Andresen (b 1966) is a professor of Educational Studies at Faculty of Education Science, Bielefeld University and vice rector for international affairs and corporate communication in Bielefeld, Germany. Her field of study is childhood and youth.

== Academia ==
Andresen has presented historical and discourse analytical works on the relationship between childhood and politics. One main focus of her research is on the well-being of children from an international perspective as well as on the threat to childhood by poverty and precarious life situations.

In Andresen's empirical qualitative research, also on the family, and in her quantitative surveys she analyses the actors’ views and their intertwining.

Since 2009 Andresen has been a board member of the International Society for Child Indicators (ISCI) and member of the committee of experts of the Federal Ministry of Families, Senior Citizens, Women, and Youth (BMFSFJ).

== Research ==
- Families and their roles in all-day elementary schools: Extended study and qualitative case studies on responsibility concepts and conceptions of families (BMBF, 2010)
- Good Prospects. Early Assistance for Families: Accompanying Empirical Research (Carina Foundation, 2009–2011); 2nd World Vision Study on Children (World Vision Deutschland e.V., 2009–2010)
- Precarious Childhood: How Children Experience Poverty (DFG, 2009–2011); The Family as Actor in All-Day Elementary Schools (BMBF, 2007–2009)
- Children, Leisure Time, and Poverty. Children at the “Arche” (Bayer Bepanthen, 2008)
- 1st World Vision Study on Children. Children in Germany (World Vision Deutschland e.V., 2007)
- DFG Research Training Group “Youth Welfare and Social Services in Transition”, 3rd funding period 2005-2008
- North Rhine-Westphalia's research school “Education and Capability“ (since 2008)
- “Marie-Curie Initial Training Network “Education as Welfare – Enhancing opportunities for socially vulnerable youth in Europe.“ (2010–2013)

== Selected publications ==
- with S. Fegter, K Hurrelmann, U. Schneekloth (eds). 2017. Well-being, Poverty and Justice from a Child's Perspective: 3rd World Vision Children Study. Springer.
- with S. Fegter. 2010. Children Growing Up in Poverty and Their Ideas on What Constitutes a Good Life: Childhood Studies in Germany. In Child Indicators Research. The Official journal of the International Society for Child Indicators. Online:.
- with I. Diehm, U. Sander, and H. Ziegler, eds. 2010. Children and the Good Life: New Challenges for Research on Children. Dordrecht: Springer.
- with K. Hurrelmann and TNS Infratest Sozialforschung. 2010. Kinder in Deutschland 2010. 2. World Vision Kinderstudie. [Children in Germany 2010. 2nd World Vision Study on Children] Frankfurt a. M.: Fischer Taschenbuch Verlag.
- 2010. Education and Capabilities from a Historical Point of View. In Education, Welfare, and the Capabilities Approach – European Perspectives, eds. H.-U. Otto and H. Ziegler, 145–154. Opladen & Farmington Hills: Barbara Budrich.
- with S. Albus, S. Fegter, and M. Richter. 2009. Wohlergehen und das „gute Leben“ in der Perspektive von Kindern. Das Potenzial des Capability Approach für die Kindheitsforschung [Well-being and the “Good Life“ in the View of Children: The Potential of the Capability Approach for Childhood Research]. Zeitschrift für Soziologie der Erziehung und Sozialisation 29(4): 346–35.
- 2009. Bildung [Education]. In Handwörterbuch Erziehungswissenschaft, eds. S. Andresen, R. Casale, T. Gabriel, R. Horlacher, S. Larcher, and J. Oelkers, 76–90. Weinheim: Beltz.
- 2008. Kinder und soziale Ungleichheit. Ergebnisse der Kindheitsforschung zu dem Zusammenhang von Klasse und Geschlecht [Children and Social Inequality: Results of Childhood Research on the Relation of Class and Gender]. In Jahrbuch Frauen- und Geschlechterforschung in der Erziehungswissenschaft [Yearbook Women's and Gender Studies in Educational Science], vol. 4, eds. A. Prengel and B. Rendtorff, 35–48. Opladen/Farmington Hills: Barbara Budrich.
- 2008. Kinder und Armut. Perspektiven der Forschung [Children and Poverty: Perspectives of Research]. In Lebensalter und Soziale Arbeit: Kindheit. Vol. 1 of Basiswissen Soziale Arbeit, 164–179. Baltmannsweiler: Schneider Verlag Hohengren
- with H.-U. Otto and H. Ziegler. 2008. Bildung [Education] as Human Development: An Educational view on the Capabilities Approach. In Capabilities – Handlungsbefähigung und Verwirklichungschancen in der Erziehungswissenschaft, eds. H.-U. Otto, and H. Ziegler, 165–197. Wiesbaden: VS Verlag.
- 2007. Vom Missbrauch der Erziehung [On the Abuse of Education]. In Vom Missbrauch der Disziplin. Antworten der Wissenschaft auf Bernhard Bueb, ed. M. Brumlik, 76–99. Weinheim/Basel: List Verlag.
