= Wilhelm Heitmeyer =

German sociologist

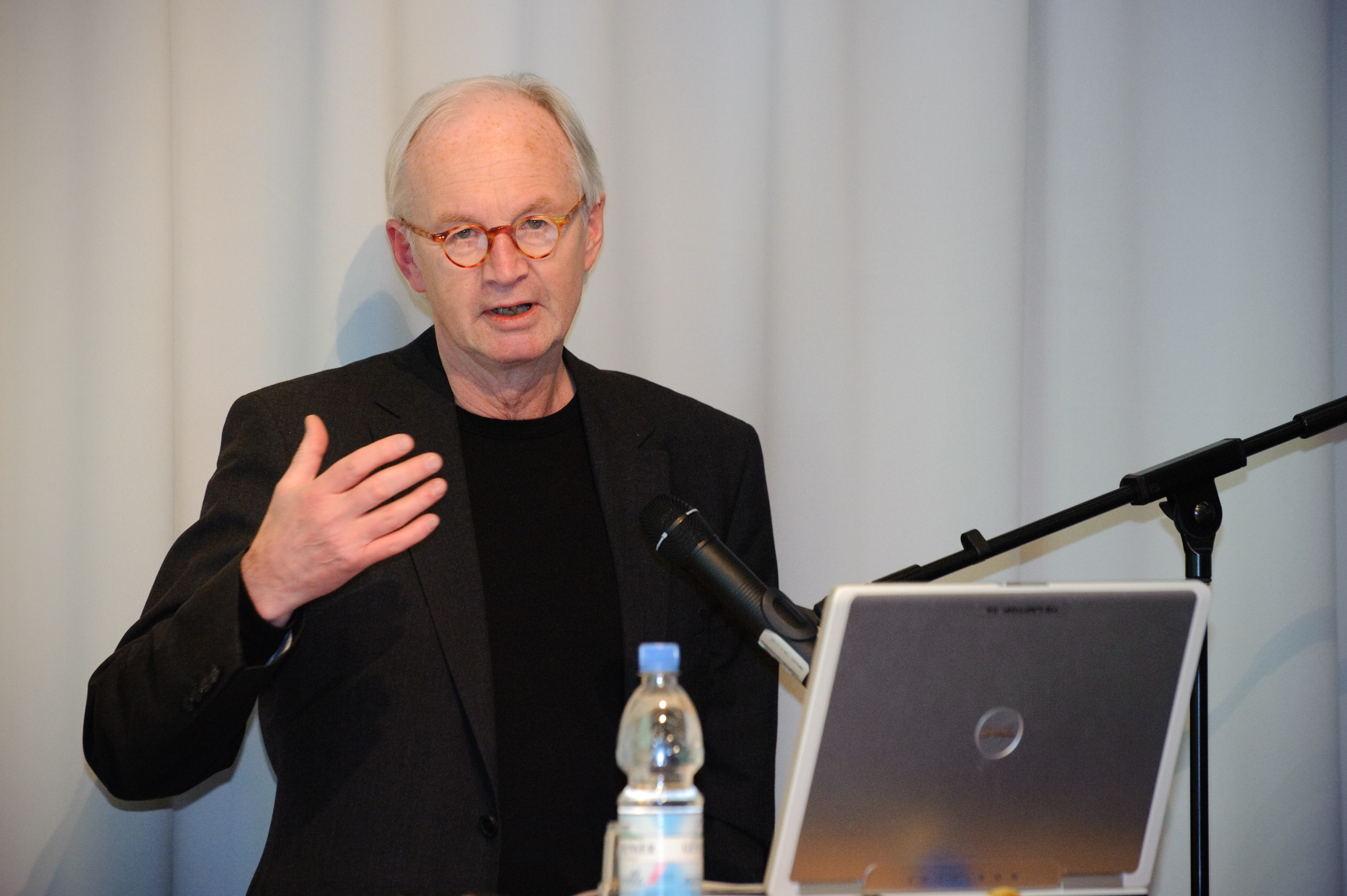
- Heitmeyer in 2010
- Born: June 28, 1945; Lübbecke, Germany
- Education: Pädagogische Hochschule Westfalen-Lippe
- Known for: Theory of Social Disintegration
- Scientific career
- Fields: Sociology
- Workplaces: Bielefeld University
- Thesis: Curriculum "Politik" und Lehrerfortbildung im Innovationsprozeß (1977)

Wilhelm Heitmeyer (born 28 June 1945, in Nettelstedt, Lübbecke, Germany) is sociologist and professor of education specializing in socialisation. From 1996 to 2013 he headed the Institute for Interdisciplinary Research on Conflict and Violence (IKG) at Bielefeld University. Since retiring as director, he has held the position of Senior Research Professor at IKG.

== Life ==
Wilhelm Heitmeyer’s father was a typesetter, who was killed in World War II. His mother worked in a cigar factory and later ran a grocer’s shop. Heitmeyer attended the Wittekind-Gymnasium in Lübbecke, North Rhine-Westphalia, before going on to study education and sociology at the University of Bielefeld. He received his doctorate in 1977, his habilitation in 1988.

Before embarking on an academic career Heitmeyer worked as a typesetter, and briefly as a secondary school teacher.

He resigned his longstanding membership of the German Social Democratic Party (SPD) in 1992, in protest at its asylum policy.

Heitmeyer has been married since 1968, and has two daughters.

== Research ==
Heitmeyer’s research interests have focused since 1983 on empirical research into right-wing extremism, violence, xenophobia, ethnic/cultural conflicts, and social disintegration. Since 1990 he has conducted a long-term investigation of group-focused enmity. Heitmeyer has completed numerous projects funded by the German Research Foundation (DFG). In the mid-1980s he was one of the first to study extreme right-wing orientations among adolescents, and also violence in soccer stadiums. In the mid-1990s he was already investigating fundamentalist orientations among young Muslims. More recently, his interest has turned to violence in the Global South.

In 1996 Heitmeyer founded the Institute for Interdisciplinary Research on Conflict and Violence, where he served as director until retiring in 2013. As founding editor-in-chief, he published the International Journal of Conflict and Violence from 2008 to 2014, together with Douglas Massey (Princeton), Steven Messner (Albany), James Sidanius (Harvard), and Michel Wieviorka (EHSS Paris).

=== Theory of Social Disintegration ===
In his work Heitmeyer puts forward the theory of social disintegration, which he developed with colleagues in the 1990s to explain violence, right-wing extremism, and ethnic/cultural conflicts. The theory is also known in the social sciences as the “Bielefeld disintegration approach,” and forms the basis for the syndrome of group-focused enmity. Disintegration is understood as the failure of societal institutions and communities to secure material existence, social recognition, and personal intactness. The essence of the theory is that as the experience and fear of disintegration increase, the extent and intensity of conflict expand and the ability to regulate it shrinks.

The concept involves three spheres of life, divided into two levels: the objective (participation, etc.) and the subjective, namely, recognition. In the disintegration approach social and societal integration of individuals and groups is understood as a successful balance between freedoms and bonds, where three specific problems are adequately resolved:

- In the sociostructural dimension, adequate participation in the material goods required for reproduction (labor, housing, consumer markets). This individual/functional system integration generates opportunities for positional recognition. - In the institutional dimension of socialization, a balance of conflicting interests (fairness, justice, democratic rule of law). This is communicative/interactive social integration, which represents opportunities for moral recognition. - In the personal dimension of communitization, the production of emotional, expressive relationships, meaning, and self-realization. This is cultural/expressive social integration and represents opportunities for emotional recognition.

Various processes work to exacerbate integration problems in modern Western societies:

- In the sociostructural dimension, social polarization reduces chances for individuals to gain access to the various social subsystems. While individualization expands personal freedoms, pressures also grow, for example to succeed in the labor market. When the probability of this recedes, frustration arises among the losers, who no longer receive positional recognition. Competition, economization, competitive thinking, and consumerism promote self-centered behavior (pushiness, social distinction, exclusion of others). - In the institutional dimension, political powerlessness leads to withdrawal from public affairs, including participation in securing core norms such as justice, solidarity, and fairness. This is associated with a loss of moral recognition. - At the socioemotional level, ambivalent individualization leads to a destabilization of couple relationships and disintegration of families, and thus endangers the socialization of children (elevated conflict potential, parental emotional stress), which also becomes visible in the loss of social recognition.

=== Violence ===
Since the 1980s Heitmeyer researches right-wing orientation among youth and the function of that orientation for the legitimization for violence. Associated therewith he researches causes for right-wing terrorism.

Another topic is violence from youth in different social contexts in association with experience of integration and disintegration. That also includes analyses about school shootings from young man.

An early research topic was violence in soccer stadiums.

Within the international context Heitmeyer dealt with the control resp. loss of control of violence. Together with John Hagan (Chicago) he published the International Handbook of Violence Research. Thereto belongs the guidance of an international.

For some time past his interest lies in violence within the global south.

=== Group-focused enmity ===
Since 2000 Heitmeyer and his research group have been investigating “group-focused enmity,” a term and concept he himself coined and developed.

Group-focused enmity describes abasement and discrimination occurring solely on the basis of actual or attributed group membership, regardless of individual behavior. The groups involved include migrants, Jews, Muslims, homosexuals, homeless people, people with disabilities, and people identified by their skin color. A ten-year project funded by the Volkswagen Foundation and a DFG graduate college investigated this field with annual representative population surveys from 2002 to 2011. The findings were published in book form (in German) in the annual “Deutsche Zustände” series (published by Suhrkamp) and in reporting in Die Zeit newspaper over a period of many years.

== Awards ==
Heitmeyer received a research professorship for 2003 to 2005 from the Volkswagen Foundation. In 2012 he received the Göttingen Peace Prize. In 2014 the Innovation Prize of the state of North Rhine-Westphalia gave Heitmeyer an honorary award for his development to conflict and violence research.[4]

== Writings (selection) ==
1. Die Fernwirkungen des Terrors. Zu den Folgen für die liberale Republik und die integrationsfähige Gesellschaft. In: Hoffmann u.a. (Hg.): Wendepunkt 11. September 2001. Terror, Islam und Demokratie, Köln, 2001, S. 221-234.
2. Right-Wing Terrorism. In: Bjorgo (Ed.): Root Causes of Terrorism. Abingdon (UK), 2005, S. 141-154.
3. (ed, with Nils Böckler, Thorsten Seeger, and Peter Sitzer): School Shootings: International Research, Case Studies, and Concepts for Prevention. New York: Springer, 2013.
4. (ed., with Andreas Grau): Menschenfeindlichkeit in Städten und Gemeinden [Group-focused enmity in cities and communities]. Weinheim: BeltzJuventa, 2013.
5. (ed., with Peter Imbusch): Desintegrationsdynamiken: Integrationsmechanismen auf dem Prüfstand [Disintegration dynamics: Scrutinizing integration mechanisms. Wiesbaden: VS Verlag, 2012.
6. (with D. Borstel): Menschenfeindliche Mentalitäten, radikalisierte Milieus und Rechtsterrorismus [Mentalities of hate, radicalized milieus, and right-wing terrorism]. In Radikale Milieus, ed. Malthaner and Waldmann. Frankfurt am Main: Campus, 2012, 339–68.
7. (ed., with Heinz-Gerhard Haupt, Stefan Malthaner, and Andrea Kirschner) Control of Violence. New York: Springer, 2011.
8. (ed.): Deutsche Zustände [German conditions]. vols. 1–10, Frankfurt am Main and Berlin: Suhrkamp, 2002–2011.
9. Kontrollverluste: Zur Zukunft der Gewalt [Losses of control: On the future of violence]. In Gewalt, ed. Heitmeyer and Soeffner. Frankfurt am Main: Suhrkamp, 2004, 86–103.
10. (ed, with John Hagan): Internationales Handbuch der Gewaltforschung. Wiesbaden: Westdeutscher Verlag, 2002. English edition: International Handbook of Violence Research. Dordrecht: Kluwer Academic, 2003.
11. Autoritärer Kapitalismus, Demokratieentleerung und Rechtspopulismus: Eine Analyse von Entwicklungtendenzen [Authoritarian capitalism, hollow democracy, and right-populism: An analysis of development trends]. In Schattenseiten der Globalisierung: Rechtsradikalismus, Rechtspopulismus und Regionalismus in westlichen Demokratien, ed. Heitmeyer and Loch. Frankfurt am Main: Suhrkamp, 2001. 497–534
12. (with Rainer Anhut): Desintegration, Konflikt und Ethnisierung: Eine Problemanalyse und theoretische Rahmenkonzeption [Disintegration, conflict, and ethnicization: Problem analysis and theoretical framework]. In Bedrohte Stadtgesellschaft: Soziale Desintegrationsprozesse und ethnisch-kulturelle Konfliktkonstellationen, ed. Heitmeyer and Anhut. Weinheim and Munich:, Juventa, 2000.
13. Die Krise der Städte: Analysen zu den Folgen desintegrativer Stadtentwicklung für das ethnisch-kulturelle Zusammenleben [Crisis of the cities: Analysis of the consequences of disintegrative urban development for ethnic/cultural coexistence]. Frankfurt am Main: Suhrkamp, 1998.
14. (ed, with Heiner Bielefeldt): Politisierte Religion: Ursachen und Erscheinungsformen des modernen Fundamentalismus [Politicized religion: Causes and manifestations of modern fundamentalism]. Frankfurt am Main, Suhrkamp 1998.
15. with Joachim Müller and Helmut Schröder): Verlockender Fundamentalismus: Türkische Jugendliche in Deutschland [Temptations of fundamentalism: Turkish youth in Germany]. Frankfurt am Main: Suhrkamp, 1997.
16. (ed.): Was treibt die Gesellschaft auseinander? [What drives society apart?]. Frankfurt am Main: Suhrkamp, 1997.
17. (ed.): Was hält die Gesellschaft zusammen? [What keeps society together?]. Frankfurt am Main: Suhrkamp, 1997
18. Entsicherungen: Desintegrationsprozesse und Gewalt [Loss of security: Disintegration processes and violence]. In: Riskante Freiheiten, ed. Beck and Beck-Gersheim. Frankfurt am Main: Suhrkamp: 1994, 376–401
19. (with Heike Buhse and Johannes Vossen): Die Bielefelder Rechtsextremismus-Studie: Erste Langzeituntersuchung zur politischen Sozialisation männlicher Jugendlicher [The Bielefeld right-wing extremism study: First long-term investigation of the political socialization of male adolescents]. Weinheim and Munich: Juventa, 1992.
20. (with Jörg-Ingo Peter): Jugendliche Fußballfans: Soziale und politische Orientierungen, Gesellungsformen, Gewalt [Adolescent soccer fans: Social and political orientations, modes of socializing, violence]. Weinheim and Munich: Juventa, 1988.
21. Rechtsextremistische Orientierungen bei Jugendlichen [Right-wing extremist orientations among adolescents]. Weinheim and Munich: Juventa, 1987.

== Newspaper articles (selection) ==
1. Kontrollverlust tut weh. Überall und unberechenbar kann Gewalt eskalieren - wo sie herkommt und was sie für die Gesellschaft bedeutet. In: Süddeutsche, 177, 2016, S. 2.
2. Wie Eskalation. In: Süddeutsche Zeitungen, 9, 2016, S. 2.
3. Rohe Bürgerlichkeit [Raw middle class]. Die Zeit, 39, 2011, p. 37.
4. Der Phyrrhussieg von Köln: Die Verhinderung des „Anti-Islamisierungskongresses“ birgt Gefahren [Pyrrhic victory in Cologne: Prevention of “anti-Islamization congress involves dangers]. Süddeutsche Zeitung, 246, 2008, p. 13.
5. Ein Land, zwei Gesellschaften [One country, two societies]. Die Zeit, 50, 2008.
6. Moralisch Abwärts im Aufschwung [Moral decline into economic recovery]. Die Zeit, 51, 2007, p. 14.
7. Wo sich Angst breitmacht [Where fear spreads]. Die Zeit, 51, 2006, p. 21
8. (with Sandra Hüpping): Auf dem Weg in eine inhumane Gesellschaft [On the road to an inhumane society]. Süddeutsche Zeitung, October 21/22, 2006, p. 13.
9. Juden, Muslime, Homosexuelle: Die Ablehnung wächst [Jews, Muslims, homosexuals: Growing rejection]. Frankfurter Allgemeine Sonntagszeitung, 10, 2005, p. 15.
10. Die verstörte Gesellschaft [Unsettled society]. Die Zeit, 51, 2005, p. 24.
11. Kontrollverluste: Zur Zukunft der Gewalt [Loss of control: On the future of violence]. Frankfurter Rundschau, 34, 2004, p. 9
12. Feindselige Normalität [Hostile normality]. Die Zeit, December 11, 2003.
13. Süchtig nach Anerkennung [Hooked on recognition] (school shootings). Die Zeit, 19, 2002, p. 4.
14. Gefährliche Selbsttäuschung: Rechts kommt nicht aus dem Nichts [Dangerous self-deception: Right-wing extremism does not come from nowhere]. Süddeutsche Zeitung, August 30, 2000.
15. Kontrollverluste und Bedrohungsgefühle [Losses of control and feelings of threat] (authoritarian temptations, globalization, right-populism). Frankfurter Rundschau, two parts, May 6 and 8, 2000.
16. Entwicklungen ernster nehmen (Die vielen Toleranzforderungen sind mit Vorsicht zu betrachten) [Take developments more seriously (The many demands for tolerance should be treated with caution)]. Tageszeitung, April 22, 1997, p. 10
17. Die Hinwendung zu einer religiös begründeten Gesellschaft: Über islamistisch-fundamentalistische Orientierungen bei türkischen Jugendlichen in Deutschland [The turn to a religiously based society: On fundamentalist Islamist orientations among Turkish youth in Germany]. Frankfurter Rundschau, 56, 1997, p. 12

== Press interviews (selection) ==
1. Was treibt den IS an, Kulturgüter zu vernichten? Ein Gespräch mit dem Konfliktforscher Wilhelm Heitmeyer [What drives the IS to damage cultural assets? An interview with the conflict researcher Wilhelm Heitmeyer] In: Die Zeit, 36, 2015, p. 30
2. Eliten sind Teil des Problems [The elites are part of the problem]. Berliner Zeitung, 128, 2012, p. 8.
3. Die Gesellschaft ist vergiftet [Society is poisoned]. Der Spiegel, 50, 2011, pp. 71–72.
4. Wutgetränkte Apathie [Anger-ridden apathy]. Der Spiegel, 14, 2010, pp. 70–71.
5. Es fehlt die Anerkennung [The recognition is missing]. Der Spiegel (Jahresrückblick 2009), pp. 180–82.
6. Du Opfer! Sebastian B. und andere „Verlierer“: Ein Gespräch mit dem Soziologen über einen heiklen Begriff [You victim! Sebastian B. and other “losers”: A discussion with a sociologist about a tricky term]. Süddeutsche Zeitung, 269, 2006, p. 13.
7. Religion ist die letzte Ressource [Religion is the last resource]. Tageszeitung, December 15, 2006, p. 3.
8. „Er wollte endlich mal stark sein“ [“He wanted to be strong for once”] (school shooting in Erfurt). Spiegel Online, May 1, 2002.
9. Das ist halbierte Aufklärung [Education halved]. Tageszeitung, October 24, 2001.
10. Der Staat will nichts wissen: Rechtsextremismus und das riskante Verhalten der Mitte [The state does not want to know: Right-wing extremism and the risky behavior of mainstream society]. Die Zeit, August 24, 2000, pp. 6–7.
11. Gewalt sucht sich Parolen [Violence seeks slogans]. Stern, 24, 1993, pp. 29–31.
12. Die Gesellschaft löst sich auf [Society dissolves itself]. Die Zeit, 43, 1992, p. 4.
13. Tief in den Alltag eingesickert: Rechtsextremismus und Gewalt [Deeply entrenched: Right-wing extremism and violence]. Spiegel, 41, 1991, pp. 32–33.

== Media reports about Wilhelm Heitmeyer (selection) ==
1. Der Kämpfer gegen die Menschenfeindlichkeit geht [Fighter against discrimination retires]. WDR television, April 14, 2013
2. Gewalten-Teilung: Unruhen, Rassismus, Hassgefühle: Professor Wilhelm Heitmeyer ist Deutschlands wohl bekanntester Konfliktforscher [Unrest, racism, hate: Professor Wilhelm Heitmeyer is Germany’s most prominent conflict researcher]. Süddeutsche Zeitung, January 23 and 28, 2013, p. 13.
3. Rette sich, wer kann: Zu Besuch beim Soziologen Wilhelm Heitmeyer [Run for your lives! A conversation with the sociologist Wilhelm Heitmeyer]. Tageszeitung, February 28, 2012.
4. Das personifizierte Frühwarnsystem der Gesellschaft [Society’s personified early-warning system]. Neue Westfälische, Marz 10/11, 2012, p. 4.
5. Der Vater der Parallelgesellschaft [The father of the parallel society]. Tageszeitung, November 16, 2007, p. 13.
6. Der die Gewalt erklärt: Ob Fundamentalismus oder Unterschicht – der Soziologe Wilhelm Heitmeyer erforscht die schwarzen Seiten der Moderne [Explains violence: From fundamentalism to underclass – sociologist Wilhelm Heitmeyer investigates the dark sides of modernity]. Die Zeit, 45, November 2, 2006.
7. Auf Forschungsreise tief im braunen Sumpf [Study trip deep in the brown morass]. Stuttgarter Zeitung, 248, 2000, p. 3.
8. Ein Mann macht sich unbeliebt: Wilhelm Heitmeyer erforscht, was die Gesellschaft zusammenhält und wie Gewalt entsteht [A man makes himself unpopular: Wilhelm Heitmeyer researches what keeps society together and where violence comes from]. Die Zeit, January 2, 1998, p. 3.

== See also ==
- Parallel society
