= Racial segregation in the United States =

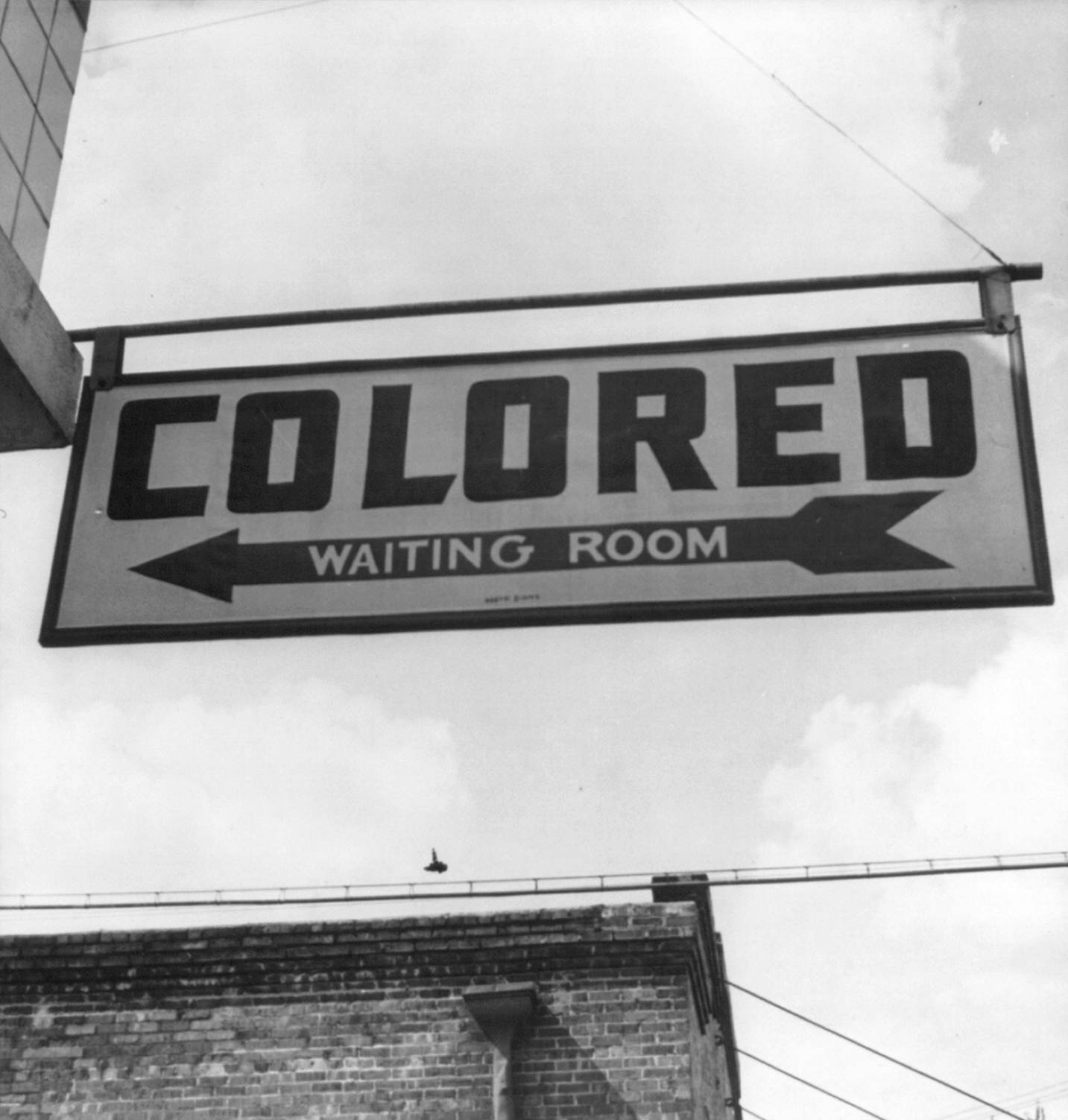
Sign for "colored" waiting room at a Greyhound bus terminal in Rome, Georgia, 1943. Throughout the Southern United States there were Jim Crow laws creating de jure legally required segregation.

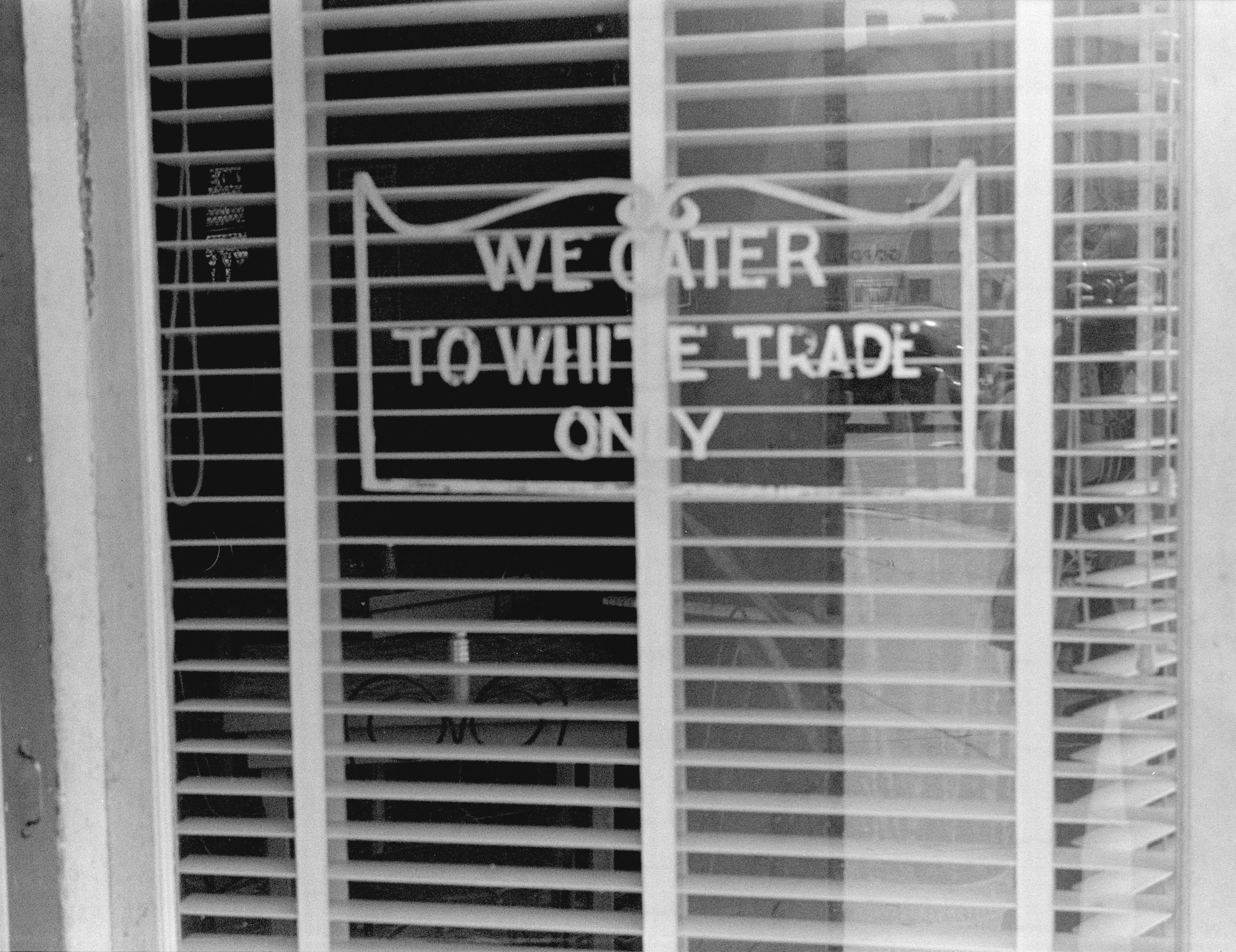
"We Cater to White Trade Only" sign on a restaurant window in Lancaster, Ohio, in 1938. Ohio, like most of the North and West, did not have de jure statutory enforced segregation (Jim Crow laws), but many places still had de facto social segregation in the early 20th century. Together with state sponsored segregation, such private owner enforced segregation was outlawed for public accommodations in the 1960s.

Racial segregation in the United States is the legally and/or socially enforced separation of black people from white people, as well as the de facto separation of other ethnic minorities from majority communities. Facilities and services such as housing, healthcare, education, employment, and transportation were, and in some ways are still, systematically separated in the United States on the basis of racial categorizations. While mainly referring to the physical separation and provision of separate facilities, racial segregation had other manifestations such as prohibitions against interracial marriage (enforced by anti-miscegenation laws) and the separation of roles within institutions. For example, the U.S. Armed Forces were formally segregated until 1948, as black units were separated from white units but were still typically led by white officers.

== Laws Pass Court ==
In the 1857 Dred Scott case (Dred Scott v. Sandford,) the U.S. Supreme Court found that Black people were not and could never be U.S. citizens and that the U.S. Constitution and civil rights did not apply to them. Congress passed the Civil Rights Act of 1875, but it was overturned by the U.S. Supreme Court in 1883 in the Civil Rights Cases. The U.S. Supreme Court upheld the constitutionality of segregation in Plessy v. Ferguson (1896), so long as "separate but equal" facilities were provided, a requirement that was rarely met. The doctrine's applicability to public schools was unanimously overturned in Brown v. Board of Education (1954). In the following years, the court further ruled against racial segregation in several landmark cases including Heart of Atlanta Motel, Inc. v. United States (1964), which helped bring an end to the Jim Crow laws.

Segregation was enforced across the U.S. for much of its history. Racial segregation follows two forms, de jure and de facto. De jure segregation mandated the separation of races by law, and was the form imposed by U.S. states in slave codes before the Civil War and by Black Codes and Jim Crow laws following the war, primarily in the Southern United States. De jure segregation was outlawed by the Civil Rights Act of 1964, the Voting Rights Act of 1965, and the Fair Housing Act of 1968. De facto segregation is that which exists without sanction of the law. De facto segregation continues today in such closely related areas as residential segregation and school segregation because of both contemporary behavior and the historical legacy of de jure segregation.

== Antebellum era ==
Schools were segregated in the U.S., and educational opportunities for black people were restricted. Efforts to establish schools for them were met with violent opposition from the public. The U.S. government established Indian boarding schools where Native Americans were sent.

The African Free School was established in New York City in the 18th century. Education during the period of slavery in the United States was limited. Richard Humphreys, Samuel Powers Emlen Jr, and Prudence Crandall established schools for African Americans in the decades preceding the Civil War.

In 1832, Prudence Crandall admitted an African American girl to her all-white Canterbury Female Boarding School in Canterbury, Connecticut, resulting in public backlash and protests. She converted the boarding school to one for only African American girls, but Crandall was jailed for her efforts for violating a Black Law. In 1835, an anti-abolitionist mob attacked and destroyed Noyes Academy, an integrated school in Canaan, New Hampshire founded by abolitionists in New England. In the 1849 case Roberts v. City of Boston, the Massachusetts Supreme Judicial Court ruled that segregated schools were allowed under the Constitution of Massachusetts. Emlen Institution was a boarding school for African American and Native American orphans in Ohio and then Pennsylvania. Richard Humphreys bequeathed money to establish the Institute for Colored Youth in Philadelphia. Yale Law School co-founder, judge, and mayor of New Haven David Daggett was a leader in the fight against schools for African Americans and helped block plans for a college for African Americans in New Haven, Connecticut.

== Civil rights after the Civil War ==
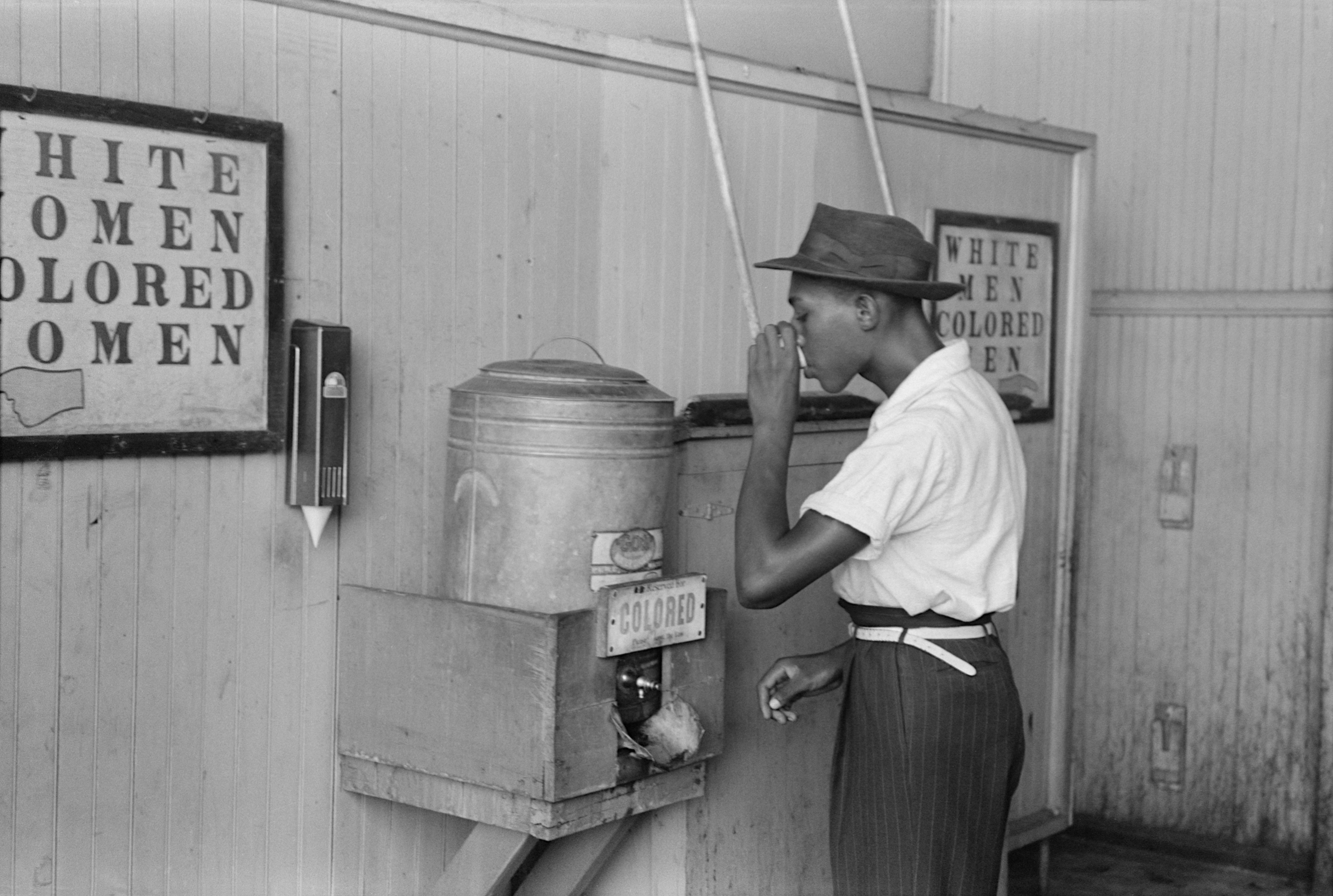
An African-American man drinking at a "colored" drinking fountain in a streetcar terminal in Oklahoma City, 1939 by Russell Lee

Black schools were established by some religious groups and philanthropists to educate African Americans. Oberlin Academy was one of the early schools to integrate. Lowell High School also accepted African American students.

California passed a law prohibiting "Negroes, Mongolians and Indians" from attending public schools. It took ten or more minorities in a community to petition for a segregated school or these groups were denied access to public education. The state's superintendent of schools, Andrew Moulder, stated: "The great mass of our citizens will not associate in terms of equality with these inferior races, nor will they consent that their children do so."

In Colorado housing and school segregation lasted into the 1960s.

In 1867, Portland, Oregon prevented a Black student from attending its public elementary schools and instead established a separate segregated school when it was sued. Portland's public schools were integrated in 1872.

== Reconstruction ==
Congress passed the Reconstruction Acts of 1867, ratified the Fifteenth Amendment to the United States Constitution in 1870, granting African Americans the right to vote, and it also enacted the Civil Rights Act of 1875 forbidding racial segregation in accommodations. Federal occupation in the South helped allow many black people to vote and elect their own political leaders. The Reconstruction amendments asserted the supremacy of the national state and they also asserted that everyone within it was formally equal under the law. However, it did not prohibit segregation in schools.

When the Republicans came to power in the Southern states after 1867, they created the first system of taxpayer-funded public schools. Southern black people wanted public schools for their children, but they did not demand racially integrated schools. Almost all the new public schools were segregated, apart from a few in New Orleans. After the Republicans lost power in the mid-1870s, Southern Democrats retained the public school systems but sharply cut their funding.

Almost all private academies and colleges in the South were strictly segregated by race. The American Missionary Association supported the development and establishment of several historically black colleges including Fisk University and Shaw University. In this period, a handful of northern colleges accepted black students. Northern denominations and especially their missionary associations established private schools across the South to provide secondary education. They provided a small amount of collegiate work. Tuition was minimal, so churches financially supported the colleges and also subsidized the pay of some teachers. In 1900, churches—mostly based in the North—operated 247 schools for black people across the South, with a budget of about $1 million. They employed 1600 teachers and taught 46,000 students. Prominent schools included Howard University, a private, federally chartered institution based in Washington, D.C.; Fisk University in Nashville, Atlanta University, Hampton Institute in Virginia, and others.

By the early 1870s, the North lost interest in further reconstruction efforts, and, when federal troops were withdrawn in 1877, the Republican Party in the South splintered and lost support, leading to the conservatives (calling themselves "Redeemers") taking control of all the Southern states. 'Jim Crow' segregation began somewhat later, in the 1880s. Disfranchisement of black people began in the 1890s. Although the Republican Party had championed African-American rights during the Civil War and had become a platform for black political influence during Reconstruction, a backlash among white Republicans led to the rise of the lily-white movement to remove African Americans from leadership positions in the party and to incite riots to divide the party, with the ultimate goal of eliminating black influence. By 1910, segregation was firmly established across the South and most of the border region, and only a small number of black leaders were allowed to vote across the Deep South.

== Jim Crow era ==
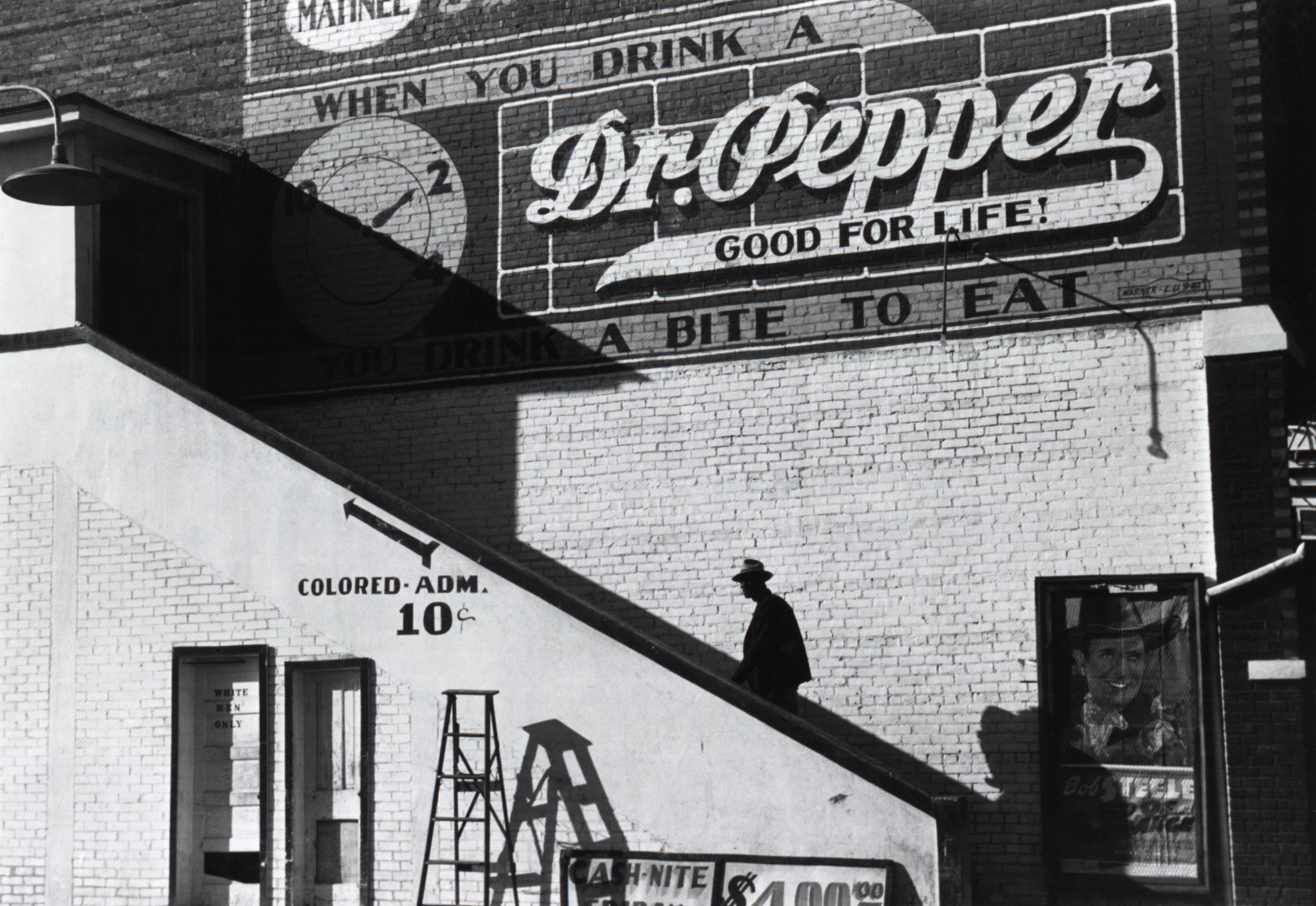
A black man goes into the "colored" entrance of a movie theater in Belzoni, Mississippi, 1939.

The legitimacy of laws requiring segregation of black people was upheld by the U.S. Supreme Court in the 1896 case of Plessy v. Ferguson, 163 U.S. 537. The Supreme Court sustained the constitutionality of a Louisiana statute that required railroad companies to provide "separate but equal" accommodations for white and black passengers and prohibited white people and black people from using railroad cars that were not assigned to their race.

Plessy thus allowed segregation, which became standard throughout the southern United States, and represented the institutionalization of the Jim Crow period. Everyone was supposed to receive the same public services (schools, hospitals, prisons, etc.), but with separate facilities for each race. In practice, the services and facilities reserved for African Americans were almost always of lower quality than those reserved for white people, if they existed at all; for example, most African American schools received less public funding per student than nearby white schools. Segregation was not mandated by law in the Northern states, but a de facto system grew for schools, in which nearly all black students attended schools that were nearly all-black. In the South, white schools had only white pupils and teachers, while black schools had only black teachers and black students.

President Woodrow Wilson, a Southern Democrat, allowed individual government department heads impose segregation of federal workplaces in 1913.

Some streetcar companies did not segregate voluntarily. It took 15 years for the government to break down their resistance.

On at least six occasions over nearly 60 years, the Supreme Court held, either explicitly or by necessary implication, that the "separate but equal" rule announced in Plessy was the correct rule of law, although, toward the end of that period, the Court began to focus on whether the separate facilities were in fact equal. The repeal of "separate but equal" laws was a major focus of the civil rights movement. In Brown v. Board of Education, 347 U.S. 483 (1954), the Supreme Court outlawed segregated public education facilities for black people and white people at the state level. The Civil Rights Act of 1964 superseded all state and local laws requiring segregation. Compliance with the new law came slowly, and it took years with many cases in lower courts to enforce it.

In parts of the United States, especially in the South, signs were used to indicate where African Americans could legally walk, talk, drink, rest, or eat.

== New Deal era ==
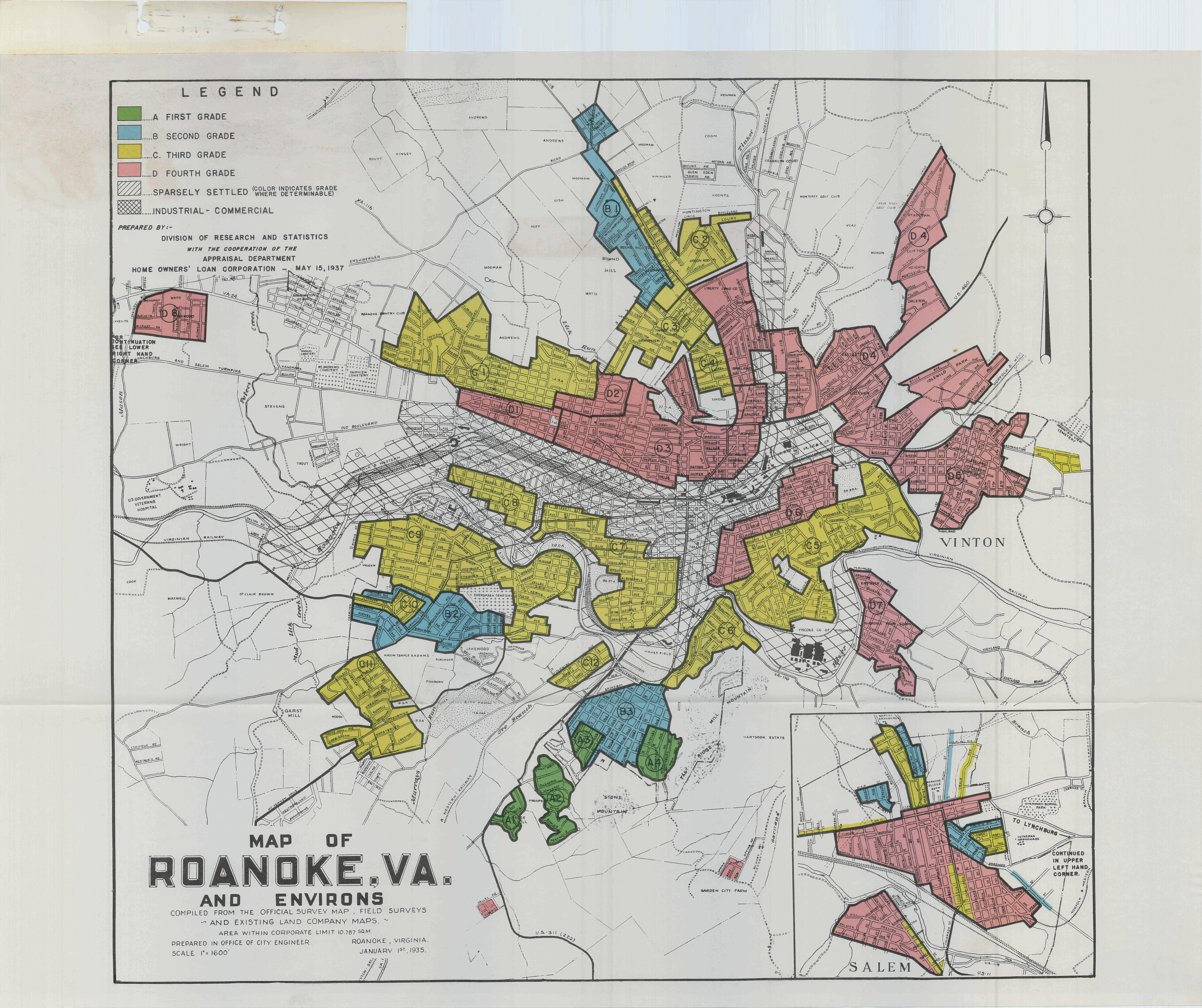
Roanoke, Virginia HOLC redlining map

With the passing of National Housing Act of 1934, the United States government began to make low-interest mortgages available to families through the Federal Housing Administration (FHA).

Black families were explicitly denied these loans. While technically legally allowed these loans, in practice they were barred. This was because eligibility for federally backed loans was largely determined by redlining maps created by the Home Owners' Loan Corporation (HOLC).

Any neighborhood with "inharmonious racial groups" would either be marked red or yellow, depending on the proportion of Black residents. This was explicitly stated within the FHA underwriting manual that the HOLC used as for its maps.

Page of HOLC document from Philadelphia redlining map. Zone D20, one of the red areas. It lists the 'Detrimental Influences' as a "concentration of Negros and Italians."

For neighborhood building projects, a similar requirement existed. The federal government required them to be explicitly segregated to be federally backed. The federal government's financial backing also required the use of racially restrictive covenants, that banned White homeowners from reselling their house to any Black buyers, effectively locking Black Americans out of the housing market.

The government encouraged white families to move into suburbs by granting them loans, which were refused to Black Americans. Many established African American communities were disrupted by the routing of interstate highways through their neighborhoods. In order to build these elevated highways, the government destroyed tens of thousands of single-family homes. Because these properties were summarily declared to be "in decline", families were given pittances for their properties, and forced to move into federally-funded housing which was called "the projects". To build these projects, still more single-family homes were demolished.

The New Deal of the 1930s as a whole was racially segregated; Black people rarely worked alongside whites in New Deal programs. The largest relief program by far was the Works Progress Administration (WPA); it operated segregated units, as did its youth affiliate, the National Youth Administration (NYA). Black people were hired by the WPA as supervisors in the North; of 10,000 WPA supervisors in the South, only 11 were Black. Historian Anthony Badger argues "New Deal programs in the South routinely discriminated against black people and perpetuated segregation." In its first few weeks of operation, Civilian Conservation Corps (CCC) camps in the North were integrated. By July 1935, practically all the CCC camps in the United States were segregated, and Black workers were strictly limited in their assigned supervisory roles. Philip Klinkner and Rogers Smith argue "even the most prominent racial liberals in the New Deal did not dare to criticize Jim Crow." Secretary of the Interior Harold Ickes was one of the Roosevelt Administration's most prominent supporters of Black people and former president of the Chicago chapter of the NAACP. In 1937, when Senator Josiah Bailey, a Democrat from North Carolina, accused him of trying to break down segregation laws, Ickes wrote him a rebuttal, saying:

I think it is up to the states to work out their social problems if possible, and while I have always been interested in seeing that the Negro has a square deal, I have never dissipated my strength against the particular stone wall of segregation. I believe that wall will crumble when the Negro has brought himself to a high educational and economic status.... Moreover, while there are no segregation laws in the North, there is segregation in fact and we might as well recognize this.

The New Deal also provided federal benefits to Black Americans. This led many to become part of the New Deal coalition from their base in Northern and Western cities where they could now vote, having in large numbers left the South during the Great Migration. Influenced in part by the "Black Cabinet" advisors and the March on Washington Movement, just prior to America's entry into World War II, Roosevelt issued Executive Order 8802, the first anti-discrimination order at the federal level and established the Fair Employment Practices Committee. Roosevelt's successor, President Harry Truman appointed the President's Committee on Civil Rights, and issued Executive Order 9980 and Executive Order 9981 providing for desegregation throughout the federal government and the armed forces.

== Hypersegregation ==
In an often-cited 1988 study, Douglas Massey and Nancy Denton compiled 20 existing segregation measures and reduced them to five dimensions of residential segregation. Dudley L. Poston and Michael Micklin argue that Massey and Denton "brought conceptual clarity to the theory of segregation measurement by identifying five dimensions".

African Americans are considered to be racially segregated because of all five dimensions of segregation being applied to them within these inner cities across the U.S. These five dimensions are evenness, clustering, exposure, centralization and concentration.

Evenness is the difference between the percentage of a minority group in a particular part of a city, compared to the city as a whole. Exposure is the likelihood that a minority and a majority party will come in contact with one another. Clustering is the gathering of different minority groups into a single space; clustering often leads to one big ghetto and the formation of "hyperghettoization". Centralization measures the tendency of members of a minority group to be located in the middle of an urban area, often computed as a percentage of a minority group living in the middle of a city (as opposed to the outlying areas). Concentration is the dimension that relates to the actual amount of land a minority lives on within its particular city. The higher segregation is within that particular area, the smaller the amount of land a minority group will control.

In the 1980s, the rise of hyper-segregation was distinctively large in black neighborhoods. The extreme segregation of African Americans resulted in a different society lived by black and white residents. The isolation of the African American community was evident in living conditions, grocery markets, job applications, etc. As segregation shaped different lifestyles in those who live in the suburbs compare to areas with public housing, the Concentration dimension of segregation played a significant role. Concentration increased poverty in black neighborhoods by providing more expensive and less ideal living situations to African Americans. This rise of poverty created a disadvantage when it came to the job market, which led to a decrease in marriage rates in the black community due to the large number of men not financially secure enough to take care of a family. Hypersegregation was prominent in creating an isolated community for African Americans in the United States. This pattern was consistent in making African American residents unstable financially which spread to other poor living conditions.

The pattern of hypersegregation began in the early 20th century. African Americans who moved to large cities often moved into the inner city in order to gain industrial jobs. The influx of new African American residents caused many white residents to move to the new suburbs (federally subsidized for white families only) in a case of white flight. This was encouraged by the government, as many were white middle-class families who lived in segregated public housing first established in the 1930s. The US government heavily advertised the suburbs to them, and the subsidized mortgages the government provided were typically cheaper than monthly rent. These same mortgages were not provided to Black Americans in public housing, leading to overcrowding, while white public housing sat vacant.

As industry began to move out of the inner city, the African American residents lost the stable jobs that had brought them to the area. Many were unable to leave the inner city and became increasingly poor. This created the inner-city ghettos that make up the core of hypersegregation. Though the Civil Rights Act of 1968 banned discrimination in housing, housing patterns established earlier saw the perpetuation of hypersegregation. Data from the 2000 census shows that 29 metropolitan areas displayed black and white hypersegregation. Two areas—Los Angeles and New York City—displayed Hispanic-white hypersegregation. No metropolitan area displayed hypersegregation for Asians or for Native Americans.

== Racism ==
President Woodrow Wilson removed many Black people from public office. He did not oppose segregation practices by autonomous department heads of the federal civil service, according to Brian J. Cook in his work, Democracy And Administration: Woodrow Wilson's Ideas And The Challenges Of Public Management. White and Black people were required to eat separately, attend separate schools, use separate public toilets, park benches, train, buses, and even use different water fountains. Stores and restaurants often refused to serve different races under the same roof.

Public segregation was challenged by individual citizens on rare occasions but had minimal impact on civil rights issues, until December 1955, in Montgomery, Alabama, Rosa Parks refused to be moved to the back of a bus for a white passenger, sparking the Montgomery bus boycott. Parks's act of defiance became an important symbol of the modern Civil Rights Movement and she became an international icon of resistance to racial segregation.

Segregation was also pervasive in housing. State constitutions (for example, that of California) had clauses giving local jurisdictions the right to regulate where members of certain races could live. In 1917, the Supreme Court in the case of Buchanan v. Warley ruled municipal resident segregation ordinances were unconstitutional. In response, whites resorted to the restrictive covenant, a formal deed restriction binding white property owners in a given neighborhood not to sell to Blacks. Whites who broke these agreements could be sued by "damaged" neighbors. In the 1948 case of Shelley v. Kraemer, the U.S. Supreme Court ruled these covenants legally unenforceable. Residential segregation patterns had already become established in most American cities and have often persisted up to the present from the impact of white flight and redlining.

In most cities, the only way Black people could relieve the pressure of crowding that resulted from increasing migration was to expand residential borders into surrounding previously White neighborhoods, a process that often resulted in harassment and attacks by White residents whose intolerant attitudes were intensified by fears that Black neighbors would cause property values to decline. Moreover, the increased presence of African Americans in cities, North and South, as well as their competition with whites for housing, jobs, and political influence sparked a series of race riots. In 1898 white citizens of Wilmington, North Carolina, resenting African Americans' involvement in local government and incensed by an editorial in an African American newspaper accusing white women of loose sexual behavior, rioted and killed dozens of Black people. In the fury's wake, white supremacists overthrew the city government, expelling black and white officeholders, and instituted restrictions to prevent Blacks from voting. In Atlanta in 1906, newspaper accounts alleging attacks by black men on white women provoked an outburst of shooting and killing that left twelve Blacks dead and seventy injured. An influx of unskilled black strikebreakers into East St. Louis, Illinois, heightened racial tensions in 1917. Rumors that Black people were arming themselves for an attack on Whites resulted in numerous attacks by white mobs on black neighborhoods. On July 1, Blacks fired back at a car whose occupants they believed had shot into their homes and mistakenly killed two policemen riding in a car. The next day, a full-scaled riot erupted which ended only after nine whites and thirty-nine blacks had been killed and over three hundred buildings were destroyed.

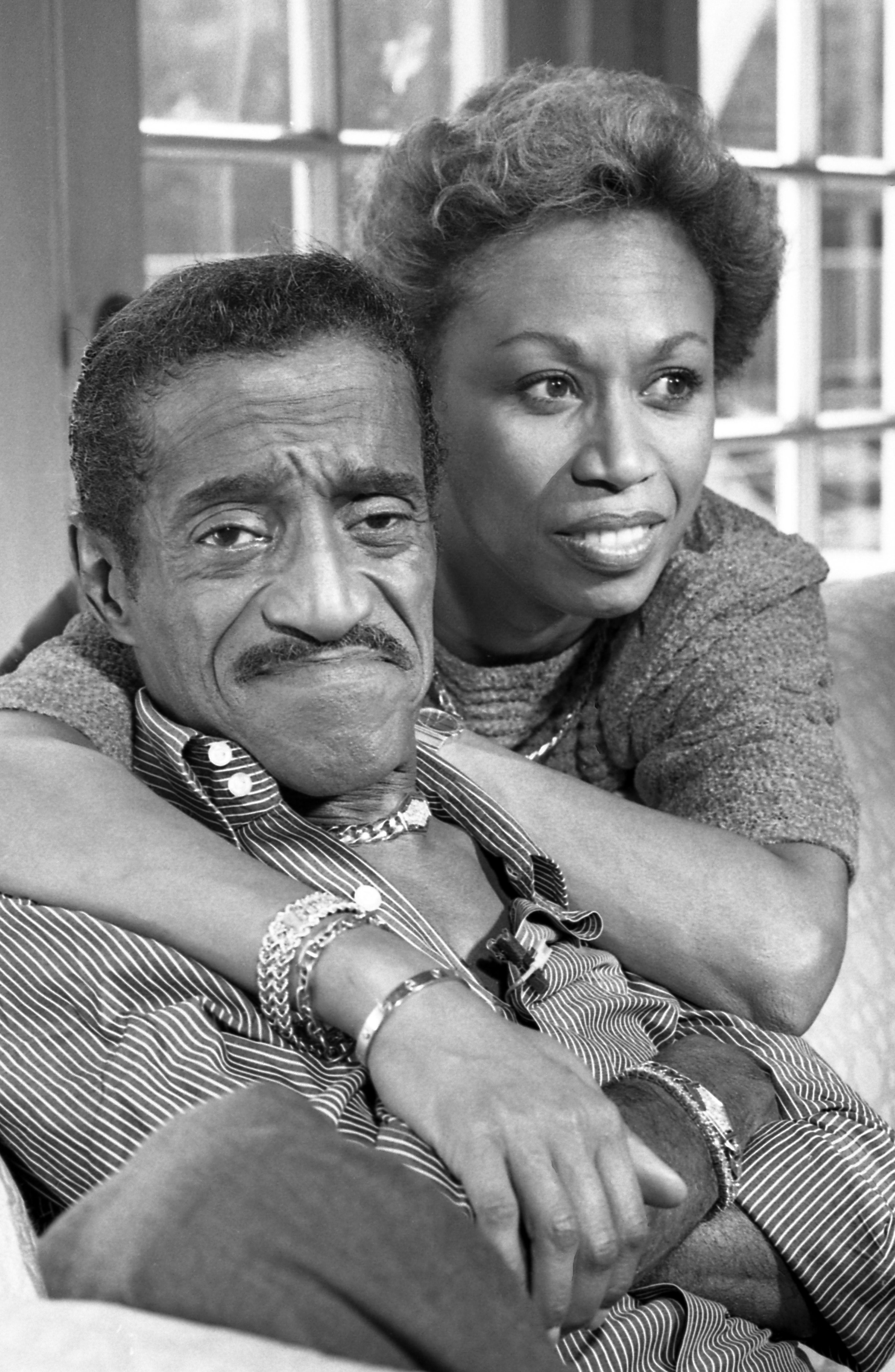
Although the ban on interracial marriage ended in California in 1948, entertainer Sammy Davis Jr. faced backlash for his involvement with a white woman in 1957.

Anti-miscegenation laws (also known as miscegenation laws) prohibited whites and non-whites from marrying each other. The first explicit anti-miscegenation law was passed by the colonial Maryland General Assembly in 1691, criminalizing interracial marriage. During one of his famous debates with Stephen A. Douglas in Charleston, Illinois in 1858, Abraham Lincoln stated,

I am not nor ever have been in favor of making voters or jurors of negroes, nor of qualifying them to hold office, nor to intermarry with white people; and I will say in addition to this that there is a physical difference between the white and black races which will ever forbid the two races living together on terms of social and political equality. And inasmuch as they cannot so live, while they do remain together, there must be the position of superior. I am as much as any other man in favor of having the superior position assigned to the white race.

By the late 1800s, 38 US states had anti-miscegenation statutes. By 1924, the ban on interracial marriage was still enforced in 29 states. While interracial marriage had been legal in California since 1948, in 1957 actor Sammy Davis Jr. faced a backlash for his involvement with white actress Kim Novak. Harry Cohn, the president of Columbia Pictures (with whom Novak was under contract) gave in to his concerns that a racist backlash against the relationship could hurt the studio. Davis briefly married black dancer Loray White in 1958 to protect himself from mob violence. Inebriated at the wedding ceremony, Davis despairingly said to his best friend, Arthur Silber Jr., "Why won't they let me live my life?" The couple never lived together and commenced divorce proceedings in September 1958. When former president Harry S. Truman was asked by a reporter in 1963 if interracial marriage would become widespread in the U.S., he responded, "I hope not; I don't believe in it", before asking a question often aimed at anyone advocating racial integration, "Would you want your daughter to marry a Negro? She won't love someone who isn't her color."

In 1958, officers in Virginia entered the home of Mildred and Richard Loving and dragged them out of bed for living together as an interracial couple, on the basis that "any white person intermarry with a colored person"— or vice versa—each party "shall be guilty of a felony" and face prison terms of five years. In 1965, Virginia trial court Judge Leon Bazile, who heard their original case, defended his decision:

Almighty God created the races white, black, yellow, Malay, and red, and placed them on separate continents, and but for the interference with his arrangement there would be no cause for such marriages. The fact that he separated the races shows that he did not intend the races to mix.

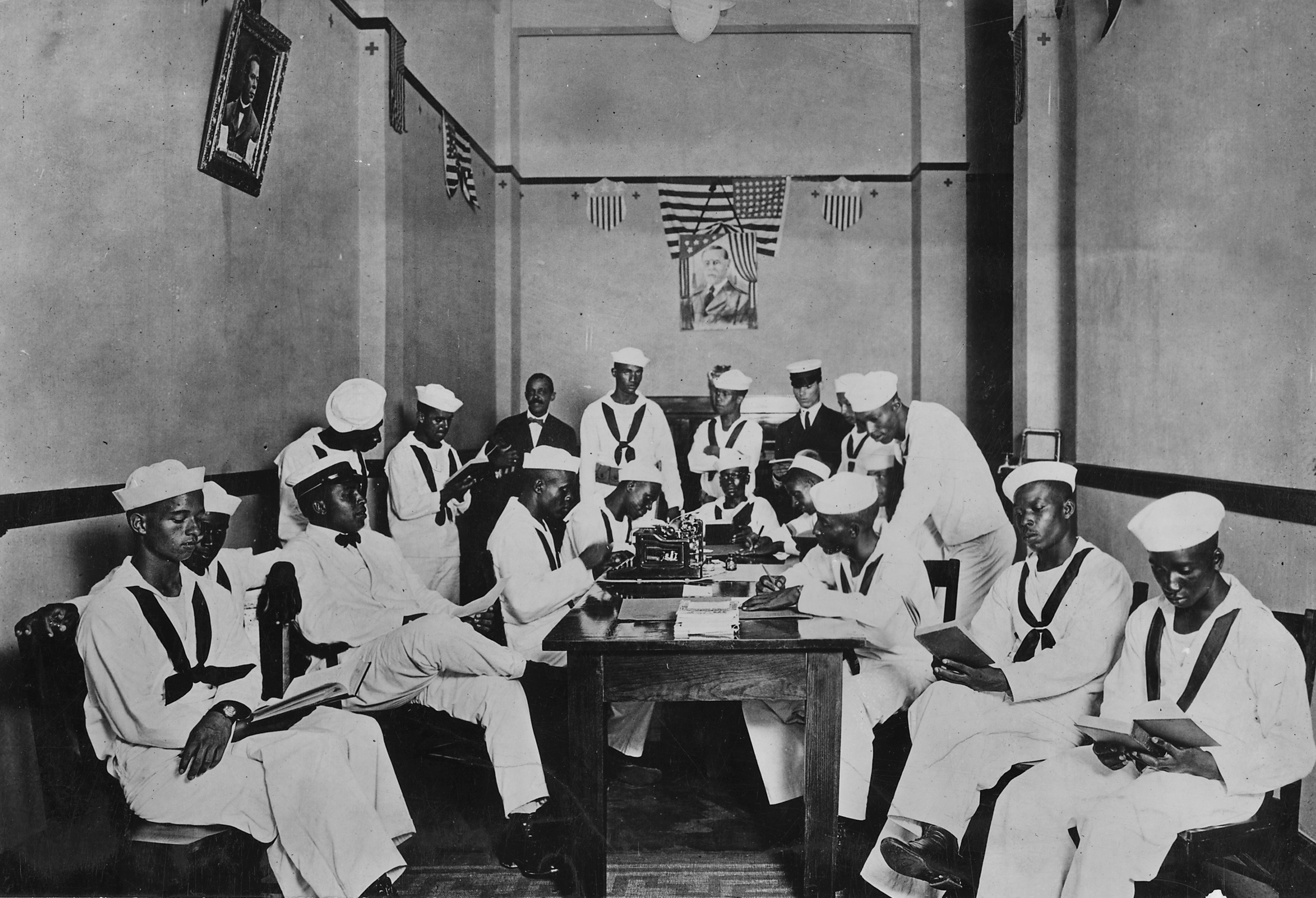
Colored sailors' room in World War I

In World War I, blacks served in the United States Armed Forces in segregated units. The 369th Infantry (formerly 15th New York National Guard) Regiment distinguished themselves and were known as the "Harlem Hellfighters".

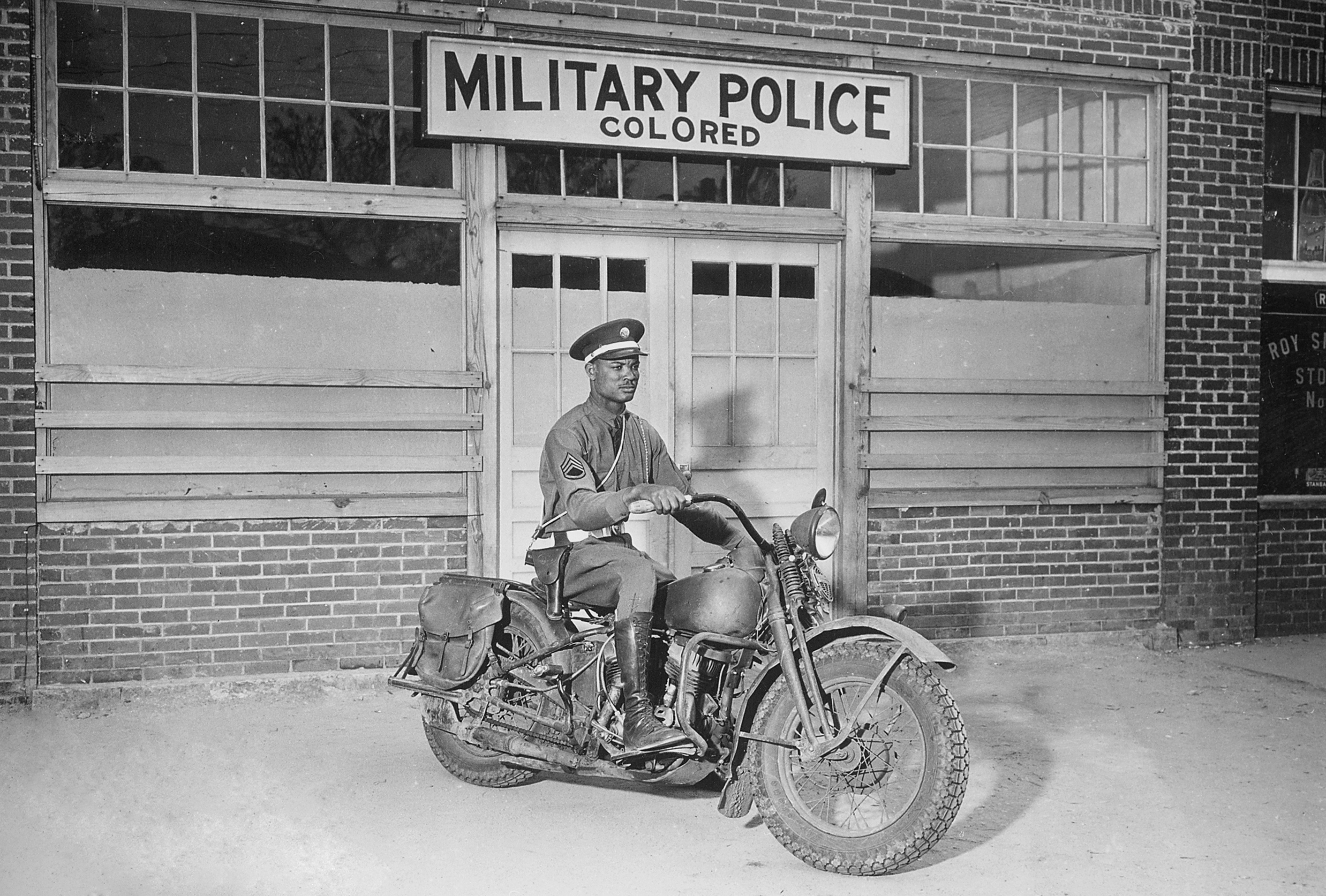
A Black military policeman in front of a "colored" entrance in Columbus, Georgia, 1942

The U.S. military was still very segregated in World War II. The Army Air Corps (forerunner of the Air Force) and the Marines had no blacks enlisted in their ranks. There were blacks in the Navy Seabees. Before the war, the army had only five African American officers. No African American received the Medal of Honor during the war, and they were mostly relegated to non-combat units. Black soldiers were sometimes forced to give up their seats in trains to Nazi prisoners of war. World War II saw the first black military pilots in the U.S., the Tuskegee Airmen, 99th Fighter Squadron, and also saw the segregated 183rd Engineer Combat Battalion participate in the liberation of Jewish survivors at Buchenwald concentration camp. Despite the institutional policy of racially segregated training for enlisted members and in tactical units; Army policy dictated that black and white soldiers train together in officer candidate schools (beginning in 1942). Thus, the Officer Candidate School became the Army's first formal experiment with integration – with all Officer Candidates, regardless of race, living and training together.

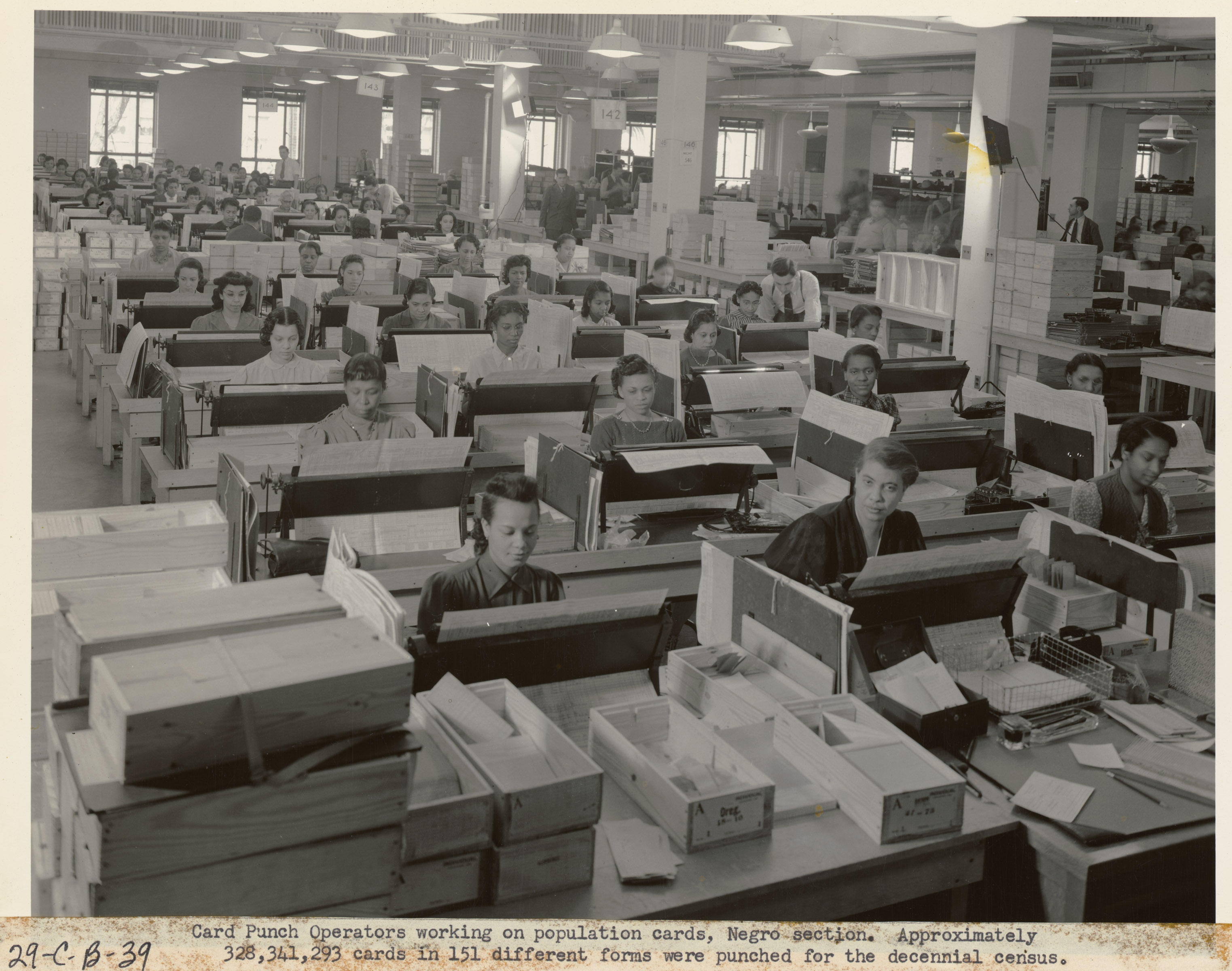
Negro section of keypunch operators at the U.S. Census Bureau

During World War II, 110,000 people of Japanese descent (whether citizens or not) were placed in internment camps. Hundreds of people of German and Italian descent were also imprisoned (see German American internment and Italian American internment). While the government program of Japanese American internment targeted all the Japanese in America as enemies, most German and Italian Americans were left in peace and were allowed to serve in the U.S. military.

Pressure to end racial segregation in the government grew among African Americans and progressives after the end of World War II. On July 26, 1948, President Harry S. Truman signed Executive Order 9981, ending segregation in the United States Armed Forces.

A club central to the Harlem Renaissance in the 1920s, the Cotton Club in Harlem, New York City, was a whites-only establishment, with blacks (such as Duke Ellington) allowed to perform, but to a white audience. The first black Oscar recipient Hattie McDaniel was not permitted to attend the premiere of Gone with the Wind with Atlanta being racially segregated, and at the 12th Academy Awards ceremony at the Ambassador Hotel in Los Angeles she was required to sit at a segregated table at the far wall of the room; the hotel had a no-blacks policy, but allowed McDaniel in as a favor. McDaniel's final wish to be buried in Hollywood Cemetery was denied because the graveyard was restricted to whites only.

On September 11, 1964, John Lennon announced The Beatles would not play to a segregated audience in Jacksonville, Florida. City officials relented following this announcement. A contract for a 1965 Beatles concert at the Cow Palace in Daly City, California, specifies that the band "not be required to perform in front of a segregated audience".

Despite all the legal changes that have taken place since the 1940s and especially in the 1960s (see Desegregation), the United States remains, to some degree, a segregated society, with housing patterns, school enrollment, church membership, employment opportunities, and even college admissions all reflecting significant de facto segregation. Supporters of affirmative action argue that the persistence of such disparities reflects either racial discrimination or the persistence of its effects.

Gates v. Collier was a case decided in federal court that brought an end to the trusty system and flagrant inmate abuse at the notorious Mississippi State Penitentiary at Parchman, Mississippi. In 1972 federal judge, William C. Keady found that Parchman Farm violated modern standards of decency. He ordered an immediate end to all unconstitutional conditions and practices. Racial segregation of inmates was abolished. And the trusty system, which allowed certain inmates to have power and control over others, was also abolished.

More recently, the disparity between the racial compositions of inmates in the American prison system has led to concerns that the U.S. Justice system furthers a "new apartheid".

=== Scientific racism ===
The intellectual roots of Plessy v. Ferguson, the landmark United States Supreme Court decision which upheld the constitutionality of racial segregation, under the doctrine of "separate but equal", were partially tied to the scientific racism of the era. The popular support of the decision was likely a result of the racist beliefs which were held by most whites at the time. Later, the court decision Brown v. Board of Education rejected the ideas of scientific racists about the need for segregation, especially in schools. Following that decision both scholarly and popular ideas of scientific racism played an important role in the attack and backlash that followed the court decision.

The Mankind Quarterly is a journal that has published scientific racism. It was founded in 1960, partly in response to the 1954 United States Supreme Court decision Brown v. Board of Education, which ordered the desegregation of US schools. Many of the publication's contributors, publishers, and board of directors espouse academic hereditarianism. The publication is widely criticized for its extremist politics, antisemitic bent and its support for scientific racism.

=== In the South ===
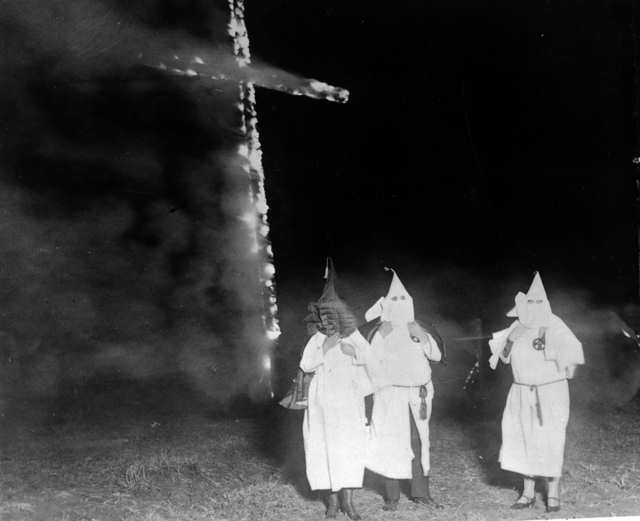
Founded by former Confederate soldiers after the Civil War (1861–1865), the Ku Klux Klan (KKK) used violence and intimidation to prevent blacks from voting, holding political office and attending school.

After the end of Reconstruction and the withdrawal of federal troops, which followed from the Compromise of 1877, the Democratic governments in the South instituted state laws to separate black and white racial groups, submitting African Americans to de facto second-class citizenship and enforcing white supremacy. Collectively, these state laws were called the Jim Crow system, after the name of a stereotypical 1830s black minstrel show character. Sometimes, as in Florida's Constitution of 1885, segregation was mandated by state constitutions.

Racial segregation became the law in most parts of the American South until the Civil Rights Movement in the 1960s. These laws, known as Jim Crow laws, forced segregation of facilities and services, prohibited intermarriage, and denied suffrage. Impacts included:

- Segregation of facilities included separate schools, hotels, bars, hospitals, toilets, parks, even telephone booths, and separate sections in libraries, cinemas, and restaurants, the latter often with separate ticket windows and counters.
  - After Reconstruction, many southern states passed Jim Crow laws and followed the "separate but equal" doctrine created during the Plessy v. Ferguson case. Segregated libraries under this system existed in most parts of the south. The East Henry Street Carnegie Library in Savannah, Georgia, built by African Americans during the segregation era in 1914 with help from the Carnegie foundation, is one example. Hundreds of segregated libraries existed across the United States prior to the Civil Rights Act of 1964. These libraries were often underfunded, understocked, and had fewer services than their white counterparts. Only during the landmark Brown v. Board of Education was the acknowledgement that separate was never equal and that African Americans were not segregating by choice. During the Civil rights movement, several demonstrations and sit-ins were orchestrated by activist including nine Tougaloo College students who were arrested when they requested service from the all-white Jackson Public Library in Mississippi. Another example was the St. Helena Four, where four local teenagers made several attempts to use the Auburn Regional Library located in Greensburg, Louisiana. Police were typically called on these civil rights activists usually resulting in some form of intimidation or incarceration. Libraries in several states continued their segregation practices even after the "separate but equal" doctrine was overruled by the Civil Rights Act. In 1964 E. J. Josey, the first African American member of ALA, put forth a resolution preventing ALA officers and staff members to attend segregated state chapter meetings. The segregated states being targeted by this resolution were Georgia, Mississippi, Alabama, and Louisiana. This resolution led to the integration of these state's libraries within a few years.
- Laws prohibited blacks from being present in certain locations. For example, blacks in 1939 were not allowed on the streets of Palm Beach, Florida after dark, unless required by their employment.
- State laws prohibiting interracial marriage ("miscegenation") had been enforced throughout the South and in many Northern states since the colonial era. During Reconstruction, such laws were repealed in Arkansas, Louisiana, Mississippi, Florida, Texas and South Carolina. In all these states such laws were reinstated after the Democratic "Redeemers" came to power. The Supreme Court declared such laws constitutional in 1883. This verdict was overturned only in 1967 by Loving v. Virginia.
- The voting rights of blacks were systematically restricted or denied through suffrage laws, such as the introduction of poll taxes and literacy tests. Loopholes, such as the grandfather clause and the understanding clause, protected the voting rights of white people who were unable to pay the tax or pass the literacy test. (See Senator Benjamin Tillman's open defense of this practice.) Only whites could vote in Democratic Party primary contests. Where and when black people did manage to vote in numbers, their votes were negated by systematic gerrymander of electoral boundaries.

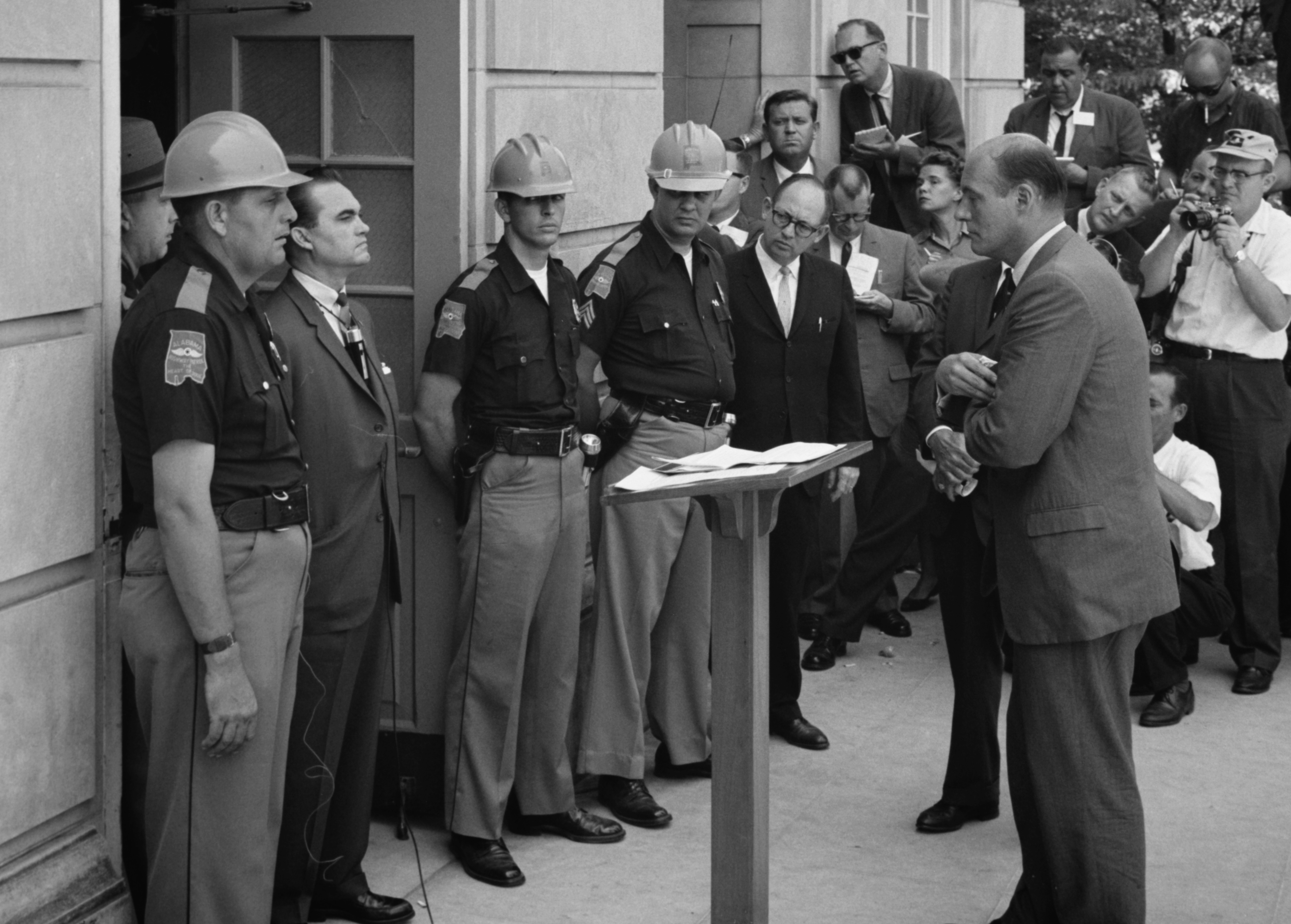
Stand in the Schoolhouse Door: Governor George Wallace attempts to block the enrollment of black students at the University of Alabama.

- In theory the segregated facilities available for negroes were of the same quality as those available to whites, under the separate but equal doctrine. In practice this was rarely the case. For example, in Martin County, Florida, students at Stuart Training School "read second-hand books...that were discarded from their all-white counterparts at Stuart High School. They also wore secondhand basketball and football uniforms.... The students and their parents built the basketball court and sidewalks at the school without the help of the school board. 'We even put in wiring for lights along the sidewalk, but the school board never connected the electricity.'"

=== In the North ===
Formal segregation was enforced in the North. Some neighborhoods were restricted to blacks and job opportunities had denied them by unions in, for example, the skilled building trades. Blacks who moved to the North in the Great Migration after World War I could sometimes live without the same degree of oppression experienced in the South, but the racism and discrimination still existed in many ways such as discrimination in housing.

Despite the actions of abolitionists, life for free blacks was far from idyllic, due to northern racism. Most free blacks lived in racial enclaves in the major cities of the North: New York, Boston, Philadelphia, and Cincinnati. There, poor living conditions led to disease and death. In a Philadelphia study in 1846, practically all poor black infants died shortly after birth. Even wealthy blacks were prohibited from living in white neighborhoods due to whites' fear of declining property values.

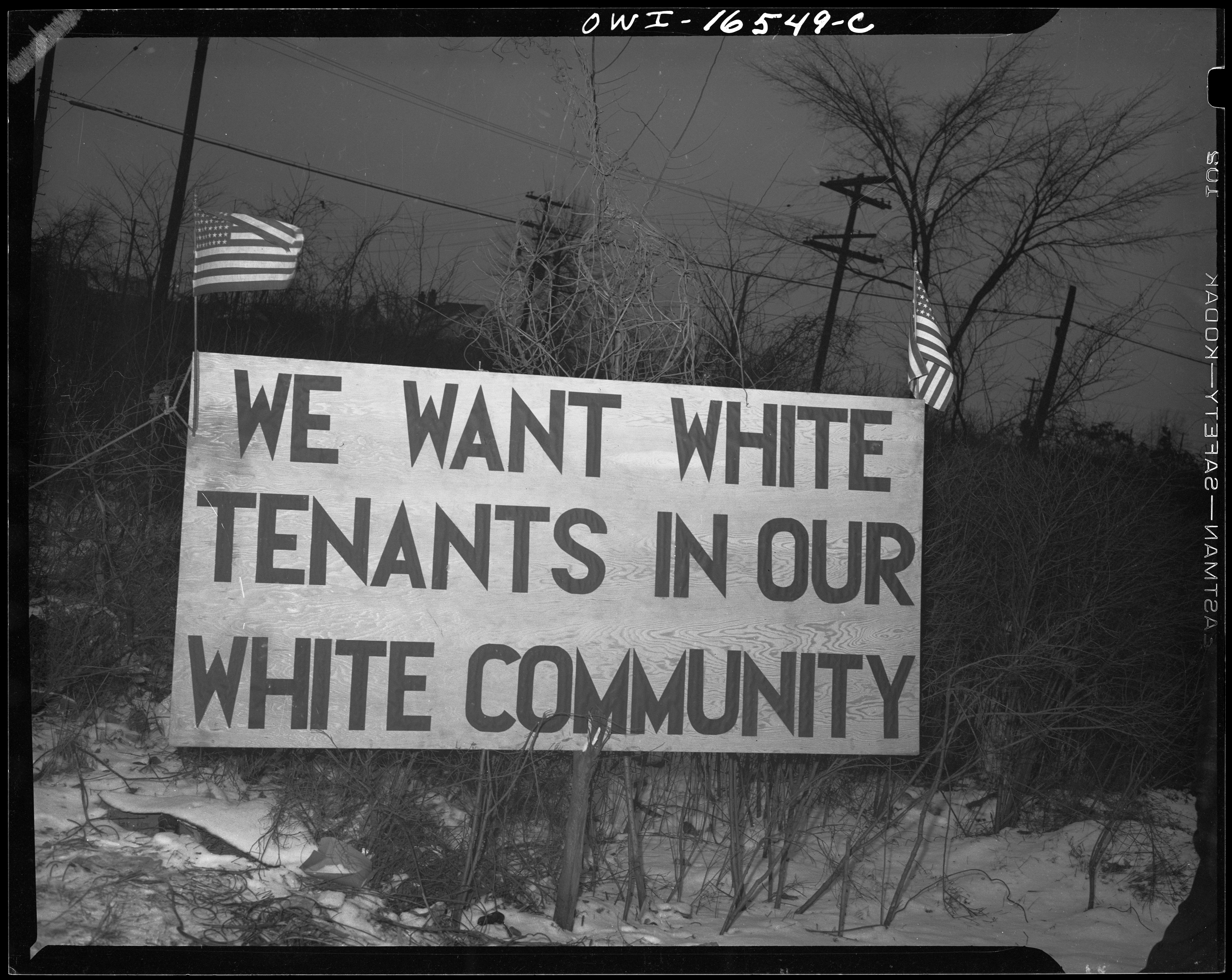
White tenants seeking to prevent blacks from moving into the Sojourner Truth housing project erected this sign. Detroit, 1942. Photograph by Arthur Siegel.

The rapid influx of blacks during the Great Migration disturbed the racial balance within Northern and Western cities, exacerbating hostility between both blacks and whites in the two regions. Deed restrictions and restrictive covenants became an important instrument for enforcing racial segregation in most towns and cities, becoming widespread in the 1920s. Such covenants were employed by many real estate developers to "protect" entire subdivisions, with the primary intent to keep "white" neighborhoods "white". Ninety percent of the housing projects built in the years following World War II were racially restricted by such covenants. Cities known for their widespread use of racial covenants include Chicago, Baltimore, Detroit, Milwaukee, Los Angeles, Seattle, and St. Louis.

Said premises shall not be rented, leased, or conveyed to, or occupied by, any person other than of the white or Caucasian race.

— Racial covenant for a home in Beverly Hills, California.

Cicero, Illinois, a former sundown town adjacent to Chicago, for example, was made famous when Civil Rights advocate Rev. Martin Luther King Jr. led a march advocating open (race-unbiased) housing in 1966.

Northern blacks were forced to live in a white man's democracy, and while not legally enslaved, were subject to definition by their race. In their all-black communities, they continued to build their own churches and schools and to develop vigilance committees to protect members of the black community from hostility and violence.

A sign posted above a bar that reads "No beer sold to Indians" (Native Americans). Birney, Montana, 1941.

Within employment, economic opportunities for blacks were routed to the lowest-status and restrictive in potential mobility. In 1900 Reverend Matthew Anderson, speaking at the annual Hampton Negro Conference in Virginia, said that "...the lines along most of the avenues of wage earning are more rigidly drawn in the North than in the South. There seems to be an apparent effort throughout the North, especially in the cities to debar the colored worker from all the avenues of higher remunerative labor, which makes it more difficult to improve his economic condition even than in the South." In the 1930s, job discrimination ended for many African Americans in the North, after the Congress of Industrial Organizations, one of America's lead labor unions at the time, agreed to integrate the union.

School segregation in the North was also a major issue. In Illinois, Ohio, Pennsylvania, and New Jersey, towns in the south of those states enforced school segregation, despite the fact that it was prohibited by state laws. Indiana also required school segregation by state law. During the 1940s, NAACP lawsuits quickly depleted segregation from the Illinois, Ohio, Pennsylvania and New Jersey southern areas. In 1949, Indiana officially repealed its school segregation law as well. The most common form of segregation in the northern states came from anti-miscegenation laws.

The state of Oregon went farther than even any of the Southern states, specifically excluding blacks from entering the state, or from owning property within it. School integration did not come about until the mid-1970s. As of 2017, the population of Oregon was about 2% black.

=== In Alaska ===
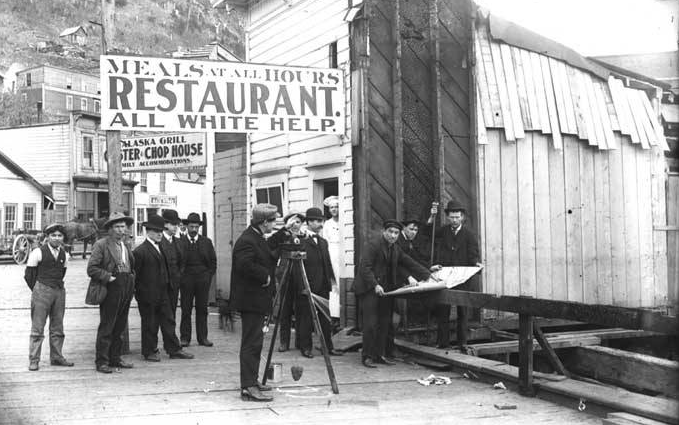
Discrimination in a restaurant in Juneau, Alaska, in 1908: "All White Help."

Racial segregation in Alaska was primarily targeted at Alaska Natives. In 1905, the Nelson Act specified an educational system for whites and one for indigenous Alaskans. Public areas such as playgrounds, swimming pools, and theaters were also segregated. Groups such as the Alaska Native Brotherhood (ANB) staged boycotts of places that supported segregation. In 1941, Elizabeth Peratrovich (Tlingit) and her husband argued to the governor of Alaska, Ernest Gruening, that segregation was "very Un-American". Gruening supported anti-discrimination laws and pushed for their passage. In 1944, Alberta Schenck (Inupiaq) staged a sit-in in the whites-only section of a theater in Nome. In 1945, the first anti-discrimination law in the United States, the Alaska Equal Rights Act, was passed in Alaska. The law made segregation illegal and banned signs that discriminate based on race.

=== Sports ===
Segregation in sports in the United States was also a major national issue. In 1900, just four years after the US Supreme Court "separate but equal" constitutional ruling, segregation was enforced in horse racing, a sport which had previously seen many African American jockeys win the Triple Crown and other major races. Widespread segregation also existed in bicycle and automobile racing. In 1890, segregation lessened for African-American track and field athletes after various universities and colleges in the northern states agreed to integrate their track and field teams. Like track and field, soccer was another which experienced a low amount of segregation in the early days of segregation. Many colleges and universities in the northern states allowed African Americans to play on their football teams.

Segregation was also hardly enforced in boxing. In 1908, Jack Johnson became the first African American to win the World Heavyweight Title. Johnson's personal life (i.e. his publicly acknowledged relationships with white women) made him very unpopular among many Caucasians throughout the world. In 1937, when Joe Louis defeated German boxer Max Schmeling, the general American public embraced an African American as the World Heavyweight Champion.

In 1904, Charles Follis became the first African American to play for a professional football team, the Shelby Blues, and professional football leagues agreed to allow only a limited number of teams to be integrated. In 1933, the NFL, now the only major football league in the United States, reversed its limited integration policy and completely segregated the entire league. The NFL color barrier permanently broke in 1946, when the Los Angeles Rams signed Kenny Washington and Woody Strode and the Cleveland Browns hired Marion Motley and Bill Willis.

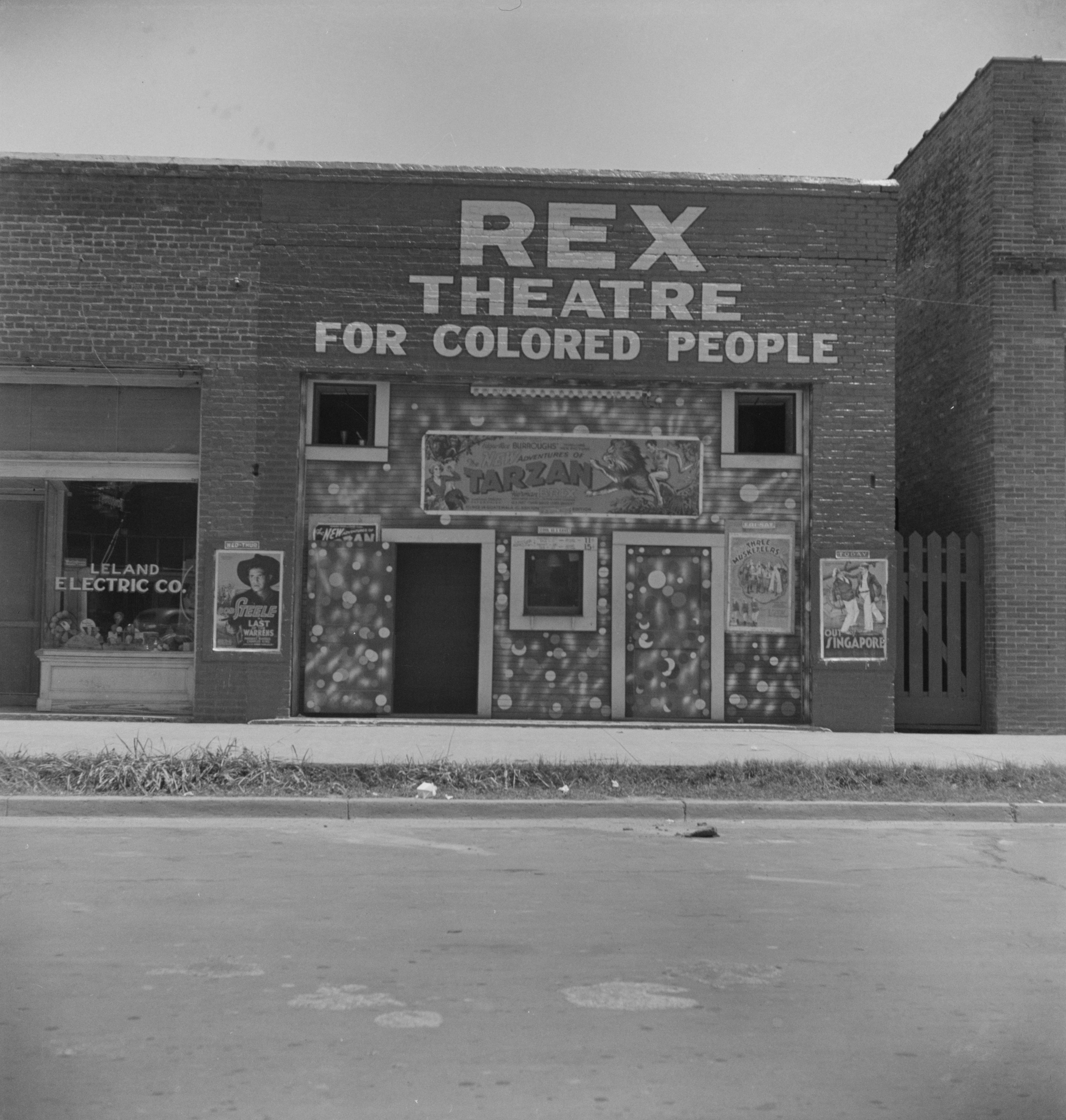
The Rex theater for colored people, Leland, Mississippi, 1937

Prior to the 1930s, basketball saw a great deal of discrimination as well. Blacks and whites played mostly in different leagues and usually were forbidden from playing in inter-racial games. The popularity of the African American Harlem Globetrotters and the New York Renaissance altered the American public's acceptance of African Americans in basketball. By the end of the 1930s, many northern colleges and universities allowed African Americans to play on their teams. In 1942, the color barrier for basketball was removed after Bill Jones and three other African American basketball players joined the Toledo Jim White Chevrolet NBL franchise and five Harlem Globetrotters joined the Chicago Studebakers.

In 1947, the baseball color line was broken when Negro league baseball player Jackie Robinson joined the Brooklyn Dodgers and had a breakthrough season. This opened the doors for many African American baseball players to follow after him.

By the end of 1949, only 15 states had no segregation laws in effect. and only eighteen states had outlawed segregation in public accommodations. Of the remaining states, twenty still allowed school segregation to take place, fourteen still allowed segregation to remain in public transportation and 30 still enforced laws forbidding miscegenation.

NCAA Division I has two historically black athletic conferences: Mid-Eastern Athletic Conference (founded in 1970) and Southwestern Athletic Conference (founded in 1920). The Central Intercollegiate Athletic Association (founded in 1912) and Southern Intercollegiate Athletic Conference (founded in 1913) are part of the NCAA Division II, whereas the Gulf Coast Athletic Conference (founded in 1981) is part of the National Association of Intercollegiate Athletics Division I.

In 1948, the National Association for Intercollegiate Basketball became the first national organization to open their intercollegiate postseason to black student-athletes. In 1953, it became the first collegiate association to invite historically black colleges and universities into its membership.

Golf was racially segregated until 1961. The Professional Golfers Association of America (PGA) had an article in its bylaws stating that it was "for members of the Caucasian race". Once the color restrictions were lifted, the United Golf Association Tour (UGA), made up of black players, ceased operations.

Public swimming pools proved to be particularly contentious venues for segregation, where "issues of hygiene, class, and gender coalesced to create an environment where segregation was especially pronounced". As efforts to desegregate pools strengthened throughout the 1940s through to the end of the 1960s, many municipalities chose to close their facilities either temporarily or permanently in an effort to avoid operating integrated facilities. One of the effects of this is demarcated by a clear divide between the prevalence of swimming ability demonstrated by people of color when compared against their white counterparts who had greater access to both swimming facilities and the programs they offered. This disparate access to swimming facilities also contributed to the development of a racial stereotype which suggests people of color cannot swim for reasons related to physicality.

== Contemporary ==
As far as I'm concerned, what he did in those days—and they were hard days, in 1937—made it possible for Negroes to have their chance in baseball and other fields.

— Lionel Hampton on Benny Goodman, who helped to launch the careers of many major names in jazz, and during an era of segregation, he also led one of the first racially integrated musical groups.

Black–white segregation is consistently declining for most metropolitan areas and cities, though there are geographical differences. In 2000, for instance, the US Census Bureau found that residential segregation has on average declined since 1980 in the West and South, but less so in the Northeast and Midwest. Indeed, the top ten most segregated cities are in the Rust Belt, where total populations have declined in the last few decades. Despite these pervasive patterns, changes for individual areas are sometimes small. Thirty years after the civil rights era, the United States remained a residentially segregated society in which blacks and whites still often inhabited vastly different neighborhoods. An article in The Guardian newspaper cited a study from the University of California, Berkeley that "more than 80% of America's large metropolitan areas were more racially segregated in 2019 than they were in 1990". The study led by Stephen Menendian found present day race segregation to occur across a range of parameters including housing and property values, schools and healthcare.

Redlining is the practice of denying or increasing the cost of services, such as banking, insurance, access to jobs, access to health care, or even supermarkets to residents in certain, often racially determined, areas. The most devastating form of redlining, and the most common use of the term, refers to mortgage discrimination. Data on house prices and attitudes toward integration suggest that in the mid-20th century, segregation was a product of collective actions taken by whites to exclude blacks from their neighborhoods.

The creation of expressways in some cases divided and isolated black neighborhoods from goods and services, many times within industrial corridors. For example, Birmingham's Interstate Highway system attempted to maintain the racial boundaries that had been established by the city's 1926 racial zoning law. The construction of Interstate Highways through black neighborhoods in the city led to significant population loss in those neighborhoods and is associated with an increase in neighborhood racial segregation.

The desire of some whites to avoid having their children attend integrated schools has been a factor in white flight to the suburbs, and in the foundation of numerous segregation academies and private schools which most African-American students, though technically permitted to attend, are unable to afford. Recent studies in San Francisco showed that groups of homeowners tended to self-segregate to be with people of the same education level and race. By 1990, the legal barriers enforcing segregation had been mostly replaced by indirect factors, including the phenomenon where whites pay more than blacks to live in predominantly white areas. The residential and social segregation of whites from blacks in the United States creates a socialization process that limits whites' chances for developing meaningful relationships with blacks and other minorities. The segregation experienced by whites from blacks fosters segregated lifestyles and leads them to develop positive views about themselves and negative views about blacks.

Segregation affects people from all social classes. For example, a survey conducted in 2000 found that middle-income, suburban Blacks live in neighborhoods with many more whites than do poor, inner-city blacks. But their neighborhoods are not the same as those of whites having the same socioeconomic characteristics; and, in particular, middle-class blacks tend to live with white neighbors who are less affluent than they are. While, in a significant sense, they are less segregated than poor blacks, race still powerfully shapes their residential options.

The number of hyper segregated inner-cities is now beginning to decline. By reviewing census data, Rima Wilkes and John Iceland found that nine metropolitan areas that had been hyper segregated in 1990 were not by 2000. Only two new cities, Atlanta and Mobile, Alabama, became hyper segregated over the same time span. These points toward a trend of greater integration across most of the United States.

=== Residential ===
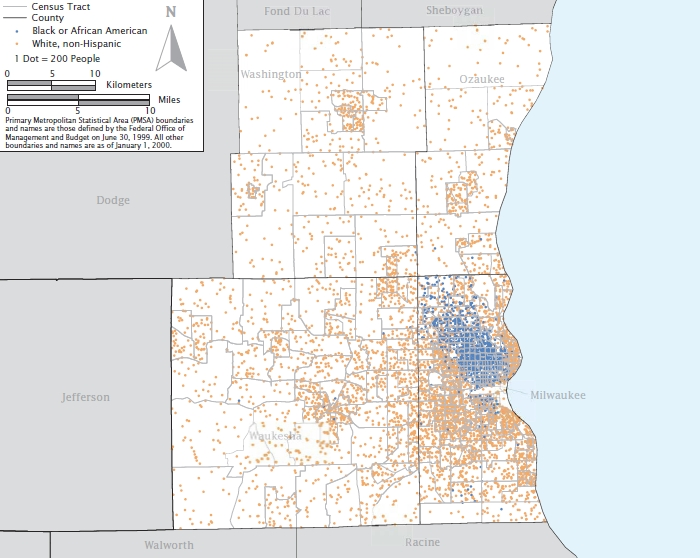
Residential segregation in Milwaukee, the most segregated city in America according to the 2000 US Census. The cluster of blue dots represent black residents.

Racial segregation is most pronounced in housing. Although in the U.S. people of different races may work together, they are still very unlikely to live in integrated neighborhoods. This pattern differs only by degree in different metropolitan areas.

Residential segregation persists for a variety of reasons. Segregated neighborhoods may be reinforced by the practice of "steering" by real estate agents. This occurs when a real estate agent makes assumptions about where their client might like to live based on the color of their skin. Housing discrimination may occur when landlords lie about the availability of housing based on the race of the applicant or give different terms and conditions to the housing based on race; for example, requiring that black families pay a higher security deposit than white families.

Redlining has helped preserve segregated living patterns for blacks and whites in the United States because discrimination motivated by prejudice is often contingent on the racial composition of neighborhoods where the loan is sought and the race of the applicant. Lending institutions have been shown to treat black mortgage applicants differently when buying homes in white neighborhoods than when buying homes in black neighborhoods in 1998.

These discriminatory practices are illegal. The Fair Housing Act of 1968 prohibits housing discrimination on the basis of race, color, national origin, religion, sex, familial status, or disability. The Office of Fair Housing and Equal Opportunity is charged with administering and enforcing fair housing laws. Any person who believes that they have faced housing discrimination based on their race can file a fair housing complaint.

Households were held back or limited to the money that could be made. Inequality was present in the workforce which lead over to the residential areas. This study provides this statistic of "The median household income of African Americans were 62 percent of non-Hispanic Whites ($27,910 vs. $44,504)" Blacks were forced by the system to be in urban and poor areas while the whites lived together, being able to afford the more expensive homes. These forced measures promoted poverty levels to rise and belittle blacks.

Massey and Denton proposed that the fundamental cause of poverty among African Americans is segregation. This segregation has created the inner city black urban ghettos that create poverty traps and keep blacks from being able to escape the underclass. It is sometimes claimed that these neighborhoods have institutionalized an inner-city black culture that is negatively stigmatized and purports the economic situation of the black community. Sociolinguist, William Labov argues that persistent segregation supports the use of African American English (AAE) while endangering its speakers. Although AAE is stigmatized, sociolinguists who study it note that it is a legitimate dialect of English as systematic as any other. Arthur Spears argues that there is no inherent educational disadvantage in speaking AAE and that it exists in vernacular and more standard forms.

Historically, residential segregation split communities between the black inner city and white suburbs. This phenomenon is due to white flight where whites actively leave neighborhoods often because of a black presence. There are more than just geographical consequences to this, as the money leaves and poverty grows, crime rates jump and businesses leave and follow the money. This creates a job shortage in segregated neighborhoods and perpetuates the economic inequality in the inner city. With the wealth and businesses gone from inner-city areas, the tax base decreases, which hurts funding for education. Consequently, those that can afford to leave the area for better schools leave decreasing the tax base for educational funding even more. Any business that is left or one that would consider opening doesn't want to invest in a community where residents have little money and suffer high crime rates, meaning the only things that are left in these communities are poor black people with little opportunity for employment or education."

Today, a number of whites are willing, and are able, to pay a premium to live in a predominantly white neighborhood. Equivalent housing in white areas commands a higher rent. By bidding up the price of housing, many white neighborhoods again effectively shut out blacks, because blacks are unwilling, or unable, to pay the premium to buy entry into white neighborhoods. While some scholars maintain that residential segregation has continued—some sociologists have termed it "hypersegregation" or "American Apartheid"—the US Census Bureau has shown that residential segregation has been in overall decline since 1980. According to a 2012 study found that "credit markets enabled a substantial fraction of Hispanic families to live in neighborhoods with fewer black families, even though a substantial fraction of black families were moving to more racially integrated areas. The net effect is that credit markets increased racial segregation."

As of 2015, residential segregation had taken new forms in the United States with black majority minority suburbs such as Ferguson, Missouri, supplanting the historic model of black inner cities, white suburbs. Meanwhile, in locations such as Washington, D.C., gentrification had resulted in development of new white neighborhoods in historically black inner cities. Segregation occurs through premium pricing by white people of housing in white neighborhoods and exclusion of low-income housing rather than through rules which enforce segregation. Black segregation is most pronounced; Hispanic segregation less so, and Asian segregation the least.

=== Commercial and industrial ===
Lila Ammons discusses the process of establishing black-owned banks during the 1880s–1990s, as a method of dealing with the discriminatory practices of financial institutions against African American citizens of the United States. Within this period, she describes five distinct periods that illustrate the developmental process of establishing these banks, which were:

In 1851, one of the first meetings to begin the process of establishing black-owned banks took place, although the ideas and implementation of these ideas were not utilized until 1888. During this period, approximately 60 black-owned banks were created, which gave blacks the ability to access loans and other banking needs, which non-minority banks would not offer African Americans.

Only five banks were opened during this time, while seeing many black-owned banks closed, leaving these banks with an expected nine-year life span for their operations. With blacks continuing to migrate toward northern urban areas, they were challenged by high unemployment rates, due to whites taking their jobs. At this time, the entire banking industry in the U.S. was stagnated, and these smaller banks even more for having higher closure rates and lower rates of loan repayment. The first groups of banks invested their profits back into the black community, whereas banks established during this period invested their finances mainly in mortgage loans, fraternal societies, and U.S. government bonds.

About 20 more banks were established during this period, which also saw African Americans become active citizens by taking part in various social movements centered around economic equality, better housing, better jobs, and the desegregation of society. Through desegregation, these banks could no longer solely depend on the Black community for business and were forced to become established on the open market, by paying their employees competitive wages, and were now required to meet the needs of the entire society instead of just the Black community.

Urban deindustrialization was occurring, resulting in the number of black-owned banks being increased considerably, with 35 banks established, during this time. Although this change in economy allowed more banks to be opened, this period further impoverished African-American communities, as unemployment rates raised more with the shift in the labour market, from unskilled labor to government jobs.

Approximately 20 banks were established during this time, competing with other financial institutions that serve the financial necessities of people at a lower cost.

Dan Immergluck writes that in 2003 small businesses in black neighborhoods still received fewer loans, even after accounting for business density, business size, industrial mix, neighborhood income, and the credit quality of local businesses. Gregory D. Squires wrote in 2003 that it is clear that race has long affected and continues to affect the policies and practices of the insurance industry. Workers living in American inner-cities have a harder time finding jobs than suburban workers, a factor that disproportionately affects black workers.

Rich Benjamin's book, Searching for Whitopia: An Improbable Journey to the Heart of White America, reveals the state of residential, educational, and social segregation. In analyzing racial and class segregation, the book documents the migration of white Americans from urban centers to small-town, exurban, and rural communities. Throughout the 20th century, racial discrimination was deliberate and intentional. Today, racial segregation and division result from policies and institutions that are no longer explicitly designed to discriminate. Yet the outcomes of those policies and beliefs have negative, racial impacts, namely with segregation.

=== Transportation ===
Local bus companies practiced segregation in city buses. This was challenged in Montgomery, Alabama by Rosa Parks, who refused to give up her seat to a white passenger, and by Rev. Martin Luther King Jr., who organized the Montgomery bus boycott (1955–1956). A federal court suit in Alabama, Browder v. Gayle (1956), was successful at the district court level, which ruled Alabama's bus segregation laws illegal. It was upheld at the Supreme Court level.

In 1961 Congress of Racial Equality director James Farmer, other CORE members and some Student Non-Violent Coordinating Committee members traveled as a mixed-race group, Freedom Riders, on Greyhound buses from Washington, D.C., headed toward New Orleans. In several states the travelers were subject to violence. In Anniston, Alabama the Ku Klux Klan attacked the buses, setting one bus on fire. After U.S. attorney general Robert F. Kennedy resisted taking action and urged restraint by the riders, Kennedy relented. He urged the Interstate Commerce Commission to issue an order directing that buses, trains, and their intermediate facilities, such as stations, restrooms and water fountains be desegregated.

== Effects ==
=== Education ===
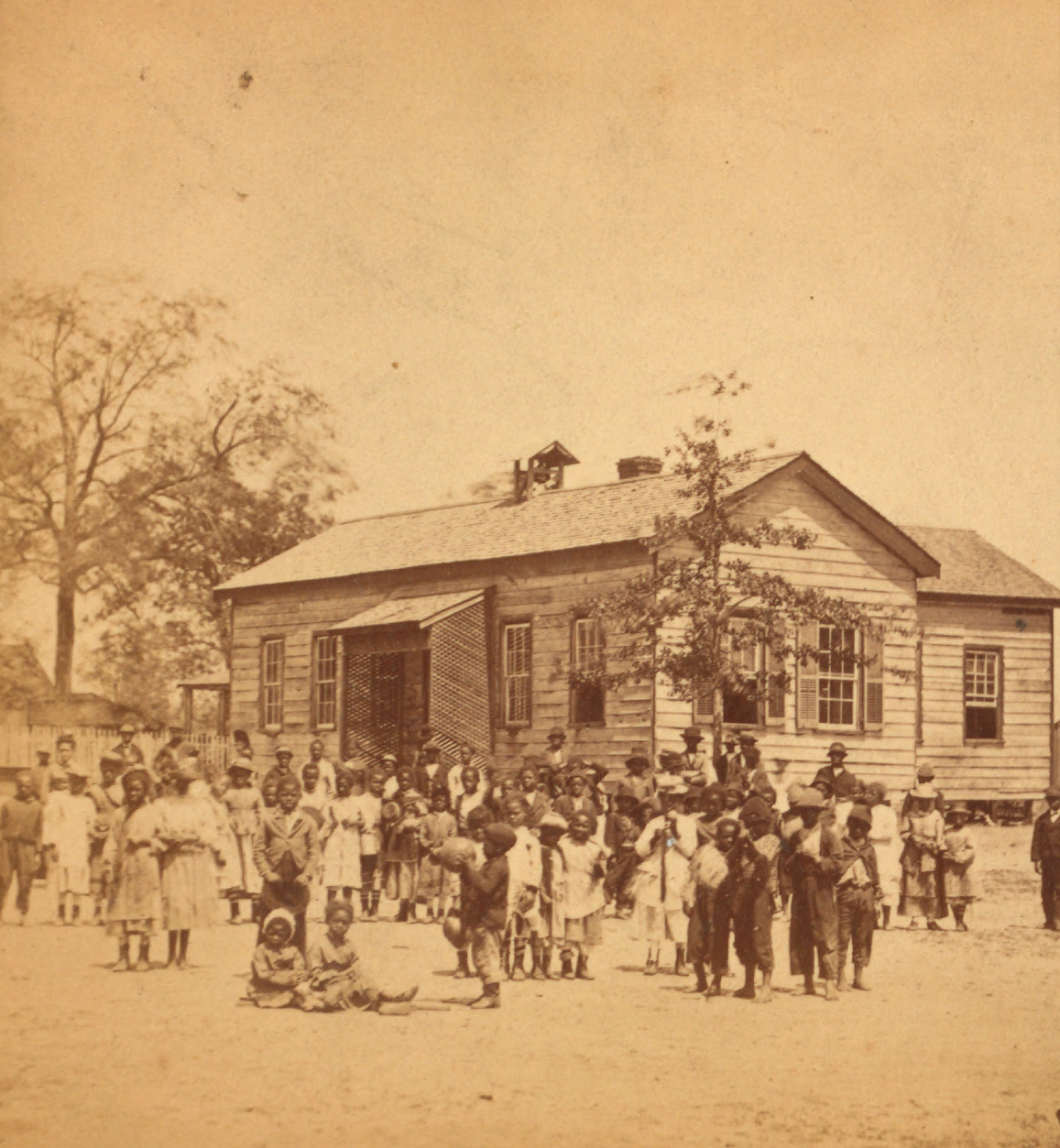
A "Colored School" in South Carolina, c. 1878

Segregation in education has major social repercussions. The prejudice that many young African Americans experience causes them undue stress which has been proven to undermine cognitive development. Eric Hanushek and his co-authors have considered racial concentrations in schools, and they find significant effects. Black students appear to be systematically and physically hurt by larger concentrations of black students in their school. These effects extend neither to white nor to Hispanic students in the school, implying that they are related to peer interactions and not to school quality. Moreover, it appears that the effect of black concentrations in schools is largest for high-achieving black students.

Even African Americans from poor inner cities who attend universities can underperform academically due to worry about family and friends still in the poverty-stricken inner cities. Education is also used as a means to perpetuate hyper-segregation. Real estate agents often implicitly use school racial composition as a way of enticing white buyers into the segregated ring surrounding the inner city.

The percentage of black children who now go to integrated public schools is at its lowest level since 1968. The words of "American apartheid" have been used in reference to the disparity between white and black schools in America. Those who compare this inequality to apartheid frequently point to unequal funding for predominantly black schools.

In Chicago, by the academic year 2002–2003, 87 percent of public-school enrollment was black or Hispanic; less than 10 percent of children in the schools were white. In Washington, D.C., 94 percent of children were black or Hispanic; less than 5 percent were white.

Jonathan Kozol expanded on this topic in his 2005 book The Shame of the Nation: The Restoration of Apartheid Schooling in America.

The "New American apartheid" refers to the allegation that U.S. drug and criminal policies in practice target blacks on the basis of race. The radical left-wing web-magazine ZNet featured a series of 4 articles on "The New American Apartheid" in which it drew parallels between the treatment of blacks by the American justice system and apartheid:

Modern prisoners occupy the lowest rungs on the social class ladder, and they always have. The modern prison system (along with local jails) is a collection of ghettos or poorhouses reserved primarily for the unskilled, the uneducated, and the powerless. In increasing numbers this system is being reserved for racial minorities, especially blacks, which is why we are calling it the New American Apartheid. This is the same segment of American society that has experienced some of the most drastic reductions in income and they have been targeted for their involvement in drugs and the subsequent violence that extends from the lack of legitimate means of goal attainment.

This article has been discussed at the Center on Juvenile and Criminal Justice and by several school boards attempting to address the issue of continued segregation.

Due to education being funded primarily through local and state revenue, the quality of education varies greatly depending on the geographical location of the school. In some areas, education is primarily funded through revenue from property taxes; therefore, there is a direct correlation in some areas between the price of homes and the amount of money allocated to educating the area's youth. The 2010 U.S. census showed that 27.4% of all African Americans lived under the poverty line, the highest percentage of any other ethnic group in the United States. Therefore, in predominantly African American areas, otherwise known as 'ghettos', the amount of money available for education is extremely low. This is referred to as "funding segregation". This questionable system of educational funding can be seen as one of the primary reasons contemporary racial segregation continues to prosper. Predominantly Caucasian areas with more money funneled into primary and secondary educational institutions allow their students the resources to succeed academically and obtain post-secondary degrees. This practice continues to ethnically, socially and economically divide America.

Alternative certificate programs were introduced in many inner-city schools and rural areas. These programs award a person a teaching license even when they did not completed a traditional teaching degree. This program came into effect in the 1980s throughout most states in response to the dwindling number of people seeking to earn a secondary degree in education. This program has been very controversial. It is "booming despite little more than anecdotal evidence of their success.[...] there are concerns about how they will perform as teachers, especially since they are more likely to end up in poor districts teaching students in challenging situations." Alternative certificate graduates tend to teach African Americans and other ethnic minorities in inner-city schools and schools in impoverished small rural towns. Therefore, impoverished minorities not only have to cope with having the smallest amount of resources for their educational facilities but also with having the least trained teachers in the nation. Valorie Delp, a mother residing in an inner-city area whose child attends a school taught by teachers awarded by an alternative certificate program notes:

One teacher we know who is in this program said he had visions of coming in to "save" the kids and the school and he really believes that this idea was kind of stoked in his program. No one ever says that you may have kids who threaten to stab you, or call you unspeakable names to your face, or can't read despite being in 7th grade.

Delp showcases that, while many graduates of these certificate programs have honorable intentions and are educated, intelligent people, there is a reason why teachers have traditionally had to take a significant amount of training before officially being certified as a teacher. The experience they gain through their practicum and extensive classroom experience equips them with the tools necessary to educate today's youth.

Some measures have been taken to try give less affluent families the ability to educate their children. President Ronald Reagan introduced the McKinney–Vento Homeless Assistance Act on July 22, 1987. This Act was meant to allow children the ability to succeed if their families did not have a permanent residence. Leo Stagman, a single, African American parent, located in Berkeley, California, whose daughter had received a great deal of aid from the Act wrote on October 20, 2012, that, "During her education, she [Leo's daughter] was eligible for the free lunch program and received assistance under the McKinney-Vento Homeless Assistance Educational Act. I know my daughter's performance is hers, but I wonder where she would have been without the assistance she received under the McKinney-Vento Act. Many students at BHS owe their graduation and success to the assistance under this law."

Leo then goes on to note that, "the majority of the students receiving assistance under the act are Black and Brown". There have been various other Acts enacted to try and aid impoverished youth with the chance to succeed. One of these Acts includes the No Child Left Behind Act of 2001 (NCLB). This Act was meant to increase the accountability of public schools and their teachers by creating standardized testing which gives an overview of the success of the school's ability to educate their students. Schools which repeatedly performed poorly could have increased attention and assistance from the federal government. One of the intended outcomes of the Act was to narrow the class and racial achievement gap in the United States by instituting common expectations for all students. Test scores have shown to be improving for minority children at the same rate as for Caucasian children, maintaining a gap.

Roland G. Fryer Jr., at Harvard University has noted that, "There is necessarily a trade-off between doing well and rejection by your peers when you come from a traditionally low-achieving group, especially when that group comes into contact with more outsiders." Therefore, not only are there economic and prehistoric causes of racial educational segregation, but there are also social notions that continue to be obstacles to be overcome before minority groups can achieve success in education.

Mississippi is one of the U.S. states where some public schools still remain highly segregated just like the 1960s when discrimination against black people was very rampant. In many communities where black kids represent the majority, white children are the only ones who enroll in small private schools. The University of Mississippi, the state's flagship academic institution enrolls unreasonably few African American and Latino young people. These schools are supposed to stand for excellence in terms of education and graduation, but the opposite is happening. Private schools located in Jackson City including small towns are populated by large numbers of white students. Continuing school segregation exists in Mississippi, South Carolina, and other communities where whites are separated from blacks.

Segregation is not limited to areas in the Deep South. In New York City, 19 out of 32 school districts had fewer white students. The United States Supreme Court tried to deal with school segregation more than six decades ago but impoverished and colored students still do not have equal access to opportunities in education. In spite of this situation, the Government Accountability Office circulated a 108-page report that showed from 2000 up to 2014, the percentage of deprived black or Hispanic students in American K–12 public schools increased from 9 to 16 percent.

=== Health ===
Another impact of hypersegregation can be found in the health of the residents of certain areas. Poorer inner cities often lack the health care that is available in outside areas. That many inner cities are so isolated from other parts of society also is a large contributor to the poor health often found in inner-city residents. The overcrowded living conditions in the inner-city caused by hypersegregation means that the spread of infectious diseases, such as tuberculosis, occurs much more frequently. This is known as "epidemic injustice" because racial groups confined in a certain area are affected much more often than those living outside the area.

Poor inner-city residents also must contend with other factors that negatively affect health. Research has proven that in every major American city, hyper segregated blacks are far more likely to be exposed to dangerous levels of air toxins. Daily exposure to this polluted air means that African Americans living in these areas are at greater risk of disease. Poor inner-city residents also must contend with other factors that negatively affect health. Research has proven that in every major American city, hyper segregated blacks are far more likely to be exposed to dangerous levels of air toxins. Daily exposure to this polluted air means that African Americans living in these areas are at greater risk of disease. Along with environmental issues such as air contaminants, African Americans face many additional barriers resulting from the systems built around them. For example, healthcare is not accessible to all due to geographic location or a lack of transportation. Additionally, African American women are more likely to receive improper screening and treatment for chronic diseases. While this does not happen with every doctor in the U.S., it creates mistrust between African American women and their healthcare providers, leading to a reluctance to seek treatment, which eventually results in even more serious health issues.

A 2024 study found that residential segregation resulted in negative birth outcomes for non-Hispanic Black infant populations in the area, while no comparable effects were detected for non-Hispanic White infant populations.

=== Crime ===
One area where hypersegregation seems to have the greatest effect is in violence experienced by residents. The number of violent crimes in the U.S. in general has fallen. The number of murders in the U.S. fell 9% from the 1980s to the 1990s. Despite this number, the crime rates in the hyper segregated inner cities of America continued to rise. As of 1993, young African American men are eleven times more likely to be shot to death and nine times more likely to be murdered than their white peers. Poverty, high unemployment, and broken families, all factors more prevalent in hyper segregated inner cities, all contribute significantly to the unequal levels of violence experienced by African Americans. Research has proven that the more segregated the surrounding white suburban ring is, the rate of violent crime in the inner-city will rise, but, likewise, crime in the outer area will drop.

=== Poverty ===
One study finds that an area's residential racial segregation increases metropolitan rates of black poverty and overall black-white income disparities, while decreasing rates of white poverty and inequality within the white population.

=== Single parenthood ===
One study finds that African Americans who live in segregated metro areas have a higher likelihood of single-parenthood than blacks who live in more integrated places. Those in poverty also show an increased chance in becoming single parents.

=== Public spending ===
Research shows that segregation along racial lines contributes to public goods inequalities. Whites and blacks are vastly more likely to support different candidates for mayor than whites and blacks in more integrated places, which makes them less able to build consensus. The lack of consensus leads to lower levels of public spending.

=== Costs ===
In April 2017, the Metropolitan Planning Council in Chicago and the Urban Institute, a think-tank located in Washington, DC, released a study estimating that racial and economic segregation is costing the United States billions of dollars every year. Statistics (1990–2010) from at least 100 urban hubs were analyzed. This study reported that segregation affecting Blacks economically was associated with higher rates of homicide.

== Caste system ==
Scholars including W. Lloyd Warner, Gerald Berreman, and Isabel Wilkerson have described the pervasive practice of racial segregation in America as an aspect of a caste system proper to the United States. In her 2020 book Caste: The Origins of Our Discontents, Wilkerson described the system of racial segregation and discrimination in the United States as one example of a caste system by comparing it to the caste systems of India and Nazi Germany. In her view, the three systems all exhibit the defining features of caste: divine or natural justification for the system, heritability of caste, endogamy, belief in purity, occupational hierarchy, dehumanization and stigmatization of lower castes, terror and cruelty as methods of enforcement and control, and the belief in the superiority of the dominant caste.

== See also ==
- African American history
- Auto-segregation
- Black flight, into suburbs
- Black Lives Matter
- Black nationalism
- Black Power
- Black separatism
- Black supremacy
- Discrimination based on skin color#United States
- Index of racism-related articles
- List of anti-discrimination acts
- Lynching in the United States
- Mass racial violence in the United States
- Race and health
- Racial integration
- Racial segregation of churches in the United States
- Racial tension in Omaha, Nebraska
- Segregated prom
- Segregation in Seattle
- St. Augustine movement
- Symbolic racism
- Timeline of African American history
- Timeline of the civil rights movement
