= Camp Algiers =

Immigration detention center in Louisiana, United States

Coordinates: 29.94265°N 90.01524°W

Camp Algiers was a World War II internment camp located in New Orleans, Louisiana. It currently serves as a U.S. Border Patrol station.

== Development ==
After the Pearl Harbor attack on December 7, 1941, distrust towards Western Europe and Japan began to increase. Paranoia among Americans increased after the discovery that more than 1 million Germans were fleeing to countries in Latin America. FBI agents were ordered by the Roosevelt administration to capture alleged Nazis in Latin America and deport them to internment camps across the southern states of the U.S. Almost 20 countries in Latin America assisted in capturing approximately 5,000 Germans who fled to their countries; however, many of the detainees were innocent. Not only were Nazis being captured and sent to the camps, so were Jews and Hitler resistors.

== Controversy ==
=== Allegations ===
Reports have shown that dictators in Latin America would accuse people of being Nazis to receive pay from the U.S. government. Some Latin American residents were accused and turned in by their government in order to gain their property and belongings.

=== Abuse ===
At these internment camps across the country, the U.S. government would allow the prisoners of war to fly their Swastika flags and sing Nazi songs at the camps in an effort to protect their freedom and welfare; however, due to the obligatory mix of opposing sides at the camps, this led to discrimination and attacks against the Jews who were held there. The National Refugee Service along with various Jewish organizations, when informed of the mistreatment of the Jewish and non-Jewish people, demanded that they be moved to Camp Algiers. Camp Algiers soon became known as 'the camp of the innocent' because about 81 Jews and non-Jews were sent there to escape harassment of Nazis at other camps. It contained a small library, musical instruments, tennis courts and a soccer field. The residents were allowed to shop locally in the french market and were encouraged to make and sell items there. The children were permitted to receive an education at Algiers elementary and high school.

== Outcome ==
In 1943, after 2 years of detainment, the Jewish internees were finally paroled. Jewish families in other cities became parolees-at-large (becoming a 'sponsor' for a refugee) and spoke out for their freedom. By the end of the year, they were allowed to leave the camps but could not return to their home countries because the war had not yet ended. By 1944, only 6 Jews were left residing at Camp Algiers. The war ended in 1945 and the facility was turned back into the New Orleans border patrol.

=== Present day ===
Most of the buildings have been demolished over the years, the largest ones being the barracks and hospital where internees were housed, have been torn down and a city park stands in their place. One remaining commanders house still stands. The remaining administration buildings are currently being used by the Department of Homeland Security.

=== Coverage ===
Due to the lack of coverage of the historical facility, many residents of the area are unaware of its history as an internment camp for Europeans trying to escape imprisonment during WWII. When asked about the history of the station, Border Patrol Agent Robert Rivet stated, "We've always been told here that the facility was used as an embarkation facility. The immigrant ships would come up the river, and pull over dockside. And the inspectors would go out and look for diseases on board the vessels and all for quarantine purposes. As far as some sort of camp, I've never heard that story."
