= Richard Humphreys (philanthropist) =

American philanthropist and silversmith (1750–1832)

Richard Humphreys (February 13, 1750 – 1832) was an American silversmith and philanthropist who founded a school for African Americans in Philadelphia. Originally called the African Institute, it was renamed the Institute for Colored Youth and eventually became Cheyney University of Pennsylvania, the oldest historically black university in the United States.

== Bequest ==
Humphreys was a Quaker philanthropist who bequeathed $10,000, one-tenth of his estate, to establish a school for "the descendants of the African race". This Institute for Colored Youth, later renamed Cheyney University, was founded in 1837 to provide educational opportunities for African Americans. Humphreys changed his will to include this bequest in 1829 after race riots occurred in Philadelphia, Pennsylvania and Cincinnati riots of 1829.

"The second bequest is of $10,000.00 for the purpose of founding an institution for the education of the descendants of the African race. He left small legacies to a shelter for colored orphans and to three city dispensaries."

== British Virgin Islands ==
Humphreys was born on Tortola in the British Virgin Islands on February 13, 1750. Sarah Lake and Thomas Humphrey married in 1744 and had five children, Richard was the fourth-born to the couple. Sarah and Thomas were wealthy members of high-society Tortola, owning and profiting from enslaved African labor on their plantation. Richard Humphreys was one of a number of highly successful individuals who came from the Quaker congregation in that territory (others included William Thornton and John Lettsom).

== Literature ==
- Claus Bernet (2010). "Richard Humphreys (philanthropist)". In Bautz, Traugott (ed.). Biographisch-Bibliographisches Kirchenlexikon (BBKL) (in German). Vol. 31. Nordhausen: Bautz. cols. 682–683. ISBN 978-3-88309-544-8.
