= Segregation in Seattle =

Like most of the United States, the Seattle metropolitan area has a history of segregationist policies and culture. This includes excluding job applicants, patients at hospitals, and turning away customers all on the basis of race. Restrictive housing covenants while they were legally effective from the early 1900s until the 1960s restricted non-white residents of Seattle's ability to own or rent homes in many neighborhoods and suburbs in Seattle. As a result, African-Americans in Seattle were concentrated into Seattle's Central District. On March 31 and April 1, 1966 thousands of Seattle Public School students boycotted the Central District in search for equality in the school systems. Many believed that the problems in the schools stemmed from almost 10,000 students being pushed into a limited amount of space. These locations were often underfunded and understaffed which resulted in poor test schools and low graduation rates. The number of protesters soon grew, including thousands of white students, and three public school teachers. The outpouring support for the issue forced the Seattle School Board to grant the public with a real solution to the problem. Today, Seattle recognizes this protest as the Seattle Public Schools Boycott of 1966

While de jure segregation enforced by law is no longer practiced, Seattle remains a highly racially segregated city. This is both from the aftermath of legalized segregation and the result of a continued practice of de facto segregation.

== See also ==
- Seattle Civil Rights and Labor History Project
