= Franklin D. Roosevelt and civil rights =

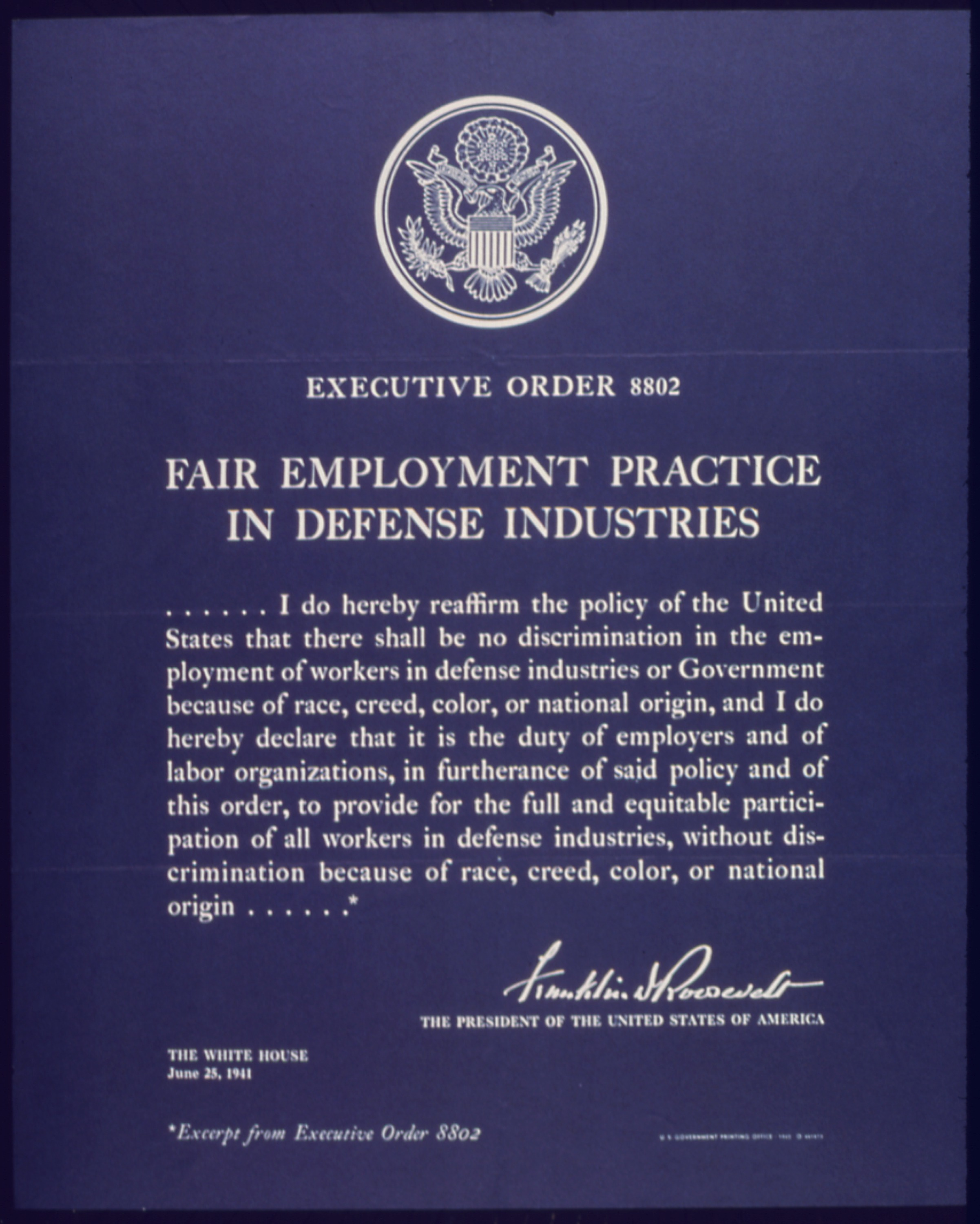
"Executive Order No. 8802", Fair Employment Practice in Defense Industries

Franklin D. Roosevelt's relationship with civil rights was a complicated one. While he was popular among African Americans, Catholics and Jews, he has in retrospect received heavy criticism for the ethnic cleansing of Mexican Americans in the 1930s known as the Mexican Repatriation and his internment of Japanese Americans during the Second World War. From its creation under the National Housing Act of 1934 signed into law by Roosevelt, official Federal Housing Administration (FHA) property appraisal underwriting standards to qualify for mortgage insurance had a whites-only requirement excluding all racially mixed neighborhoods or white neighborhoods in proximity to black neighborhoods, and the FHA used its official mortgage insurance underwriting policy explicitly to prevent school desegregation.

== Mexican Repatriation ==
From his first term until 1939, the Mexican Repatriation started by President Herbert Hoover continued under Roosevelt, which some scholars today contend was a form of ethnic cleansing towards Mexican Americans. Roosevelt ended federal involvement in the deportations. After 1934, the number of deportations fell by approximately 50 percent. However, Roosevelt did not attempt to suppress the deportations on a local or state level. Mexican Americans were the only group within the United States explicitly excluded from New Deal benefits.

== African Americans ==
FDR repeatedly deferred to Southern Democrats who wanted to exclude agricultural and domestic workers from New Deal benefits or to administer New Deal programs partially through the states in order to reduce the benefits that African Americans received. Nonetheless, African Americans generally appreciated New Deal programs, and African Americans increasingly left the Republican Party for the Democratic Party under FDR's presidency.

In June 1941, Roosevelt issued Executive Order 8802, which created the Fair Employment Practice Committee (FEPC). It was the most important federal move in support of the rights of African-Americans between Reconstruction and the Civil Rights Act of 1964. The President's order stated that the federal government would not hire any person based on their race, color, creed, or national origin in the federal government or defense-related administration. The FEPC enforced the order to ban discriminatory hiring within the federal government and in corporations that received federal contracts.

Some activists, including Rustin, felt betrayed because Roosevelt's order banned discrimination only in war industries, not the armed forces. Zora Neale Hurston later complained, "Poor Randolph was tricked and trapped by that committee that FDR sent into a backroom of the White House to come back with some device that would save the face of the Administration and that was all that happened."

Millions of black men and women achieved better jobs and better pay as a result. The war brought the race issue to the forefront. The Army had been segregated since the Civil War, and the Navy since the Wilson administration. But by 1940, the African-American vote had largely shifted from Republican to Democrat, and African-American leaders like Walter Francis White of the NAACP and T. Arnold Hill of the Urban League had become recognized as part of the Roosevelt coalition.

In June 1941, at the urging of A. Philip Randolph, the leading African-American trade unionist, Roosevelt signed an executive order establishing the Fair Employment Practice Committee and prohibiting discrimination by any government agency, including the armed forces. In practice, the services, particularly the Navy and the Marines, found ways to evade this order, and the Marine Corps remained all-white until 1942.

In September 1942, at Eleanor's instigation, Roosevelt met with a delegation of African-American leaders, who demanded full integration into the forces, including the right to serve in combat roles and in the Navy, the Marine Corps and the United States Army Air Forces. Roosevelt agreed, but did nothing to implement his promise; it was left to his successor, Harry S. Truman, to fully desegregate the armed forces.

== Executive Order 9066 ==
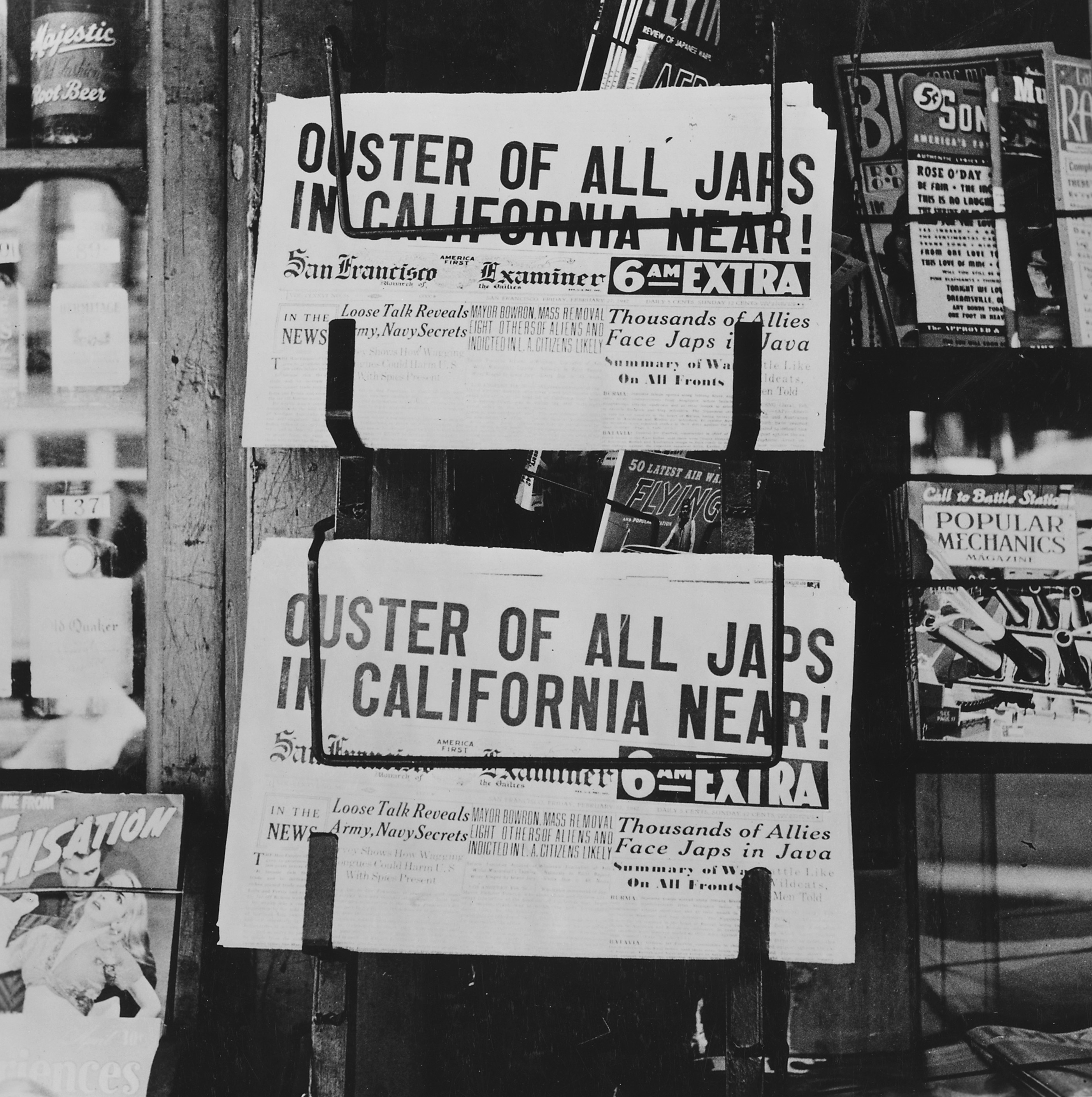
San Francisco Examiner calling for Japanese Americans in California to be expelled

Following the outbreak of the Pacific War, the War Department demanded that all enemy nationals and Japanese American citizens be removed from war zones on the West Coast. The question became how to imprison the estimated 120,000 people of Japanese and American citizenship living in California. On February 11, 1942, Roosevelt met with Secretary of War Stimson, who persuaded him to approve an immediate forced evacuation. Roosevelt looked at the secret evidence available to him: the Japanese in the Philippines had collaborated with the Japanese invasion troops; the Japanese in California had been strong supporters of Japan in the war against China. There was evidence of espionage compiled by code-breakers that decrypted messages to Japan from agents in North America and Hawaii before and after Pearl Harbor. These MAGIC cables were kept secret from all but those with the highest clearance, such as Roosevelt, lest the Japanese discover the decryption and change their code. On February 19, 1942, Roosevelt signed Executive Order 9066 which ordered Secretary of War, and military commanders to designate military areas "from which any or all persons may be excluded." Roosevelt released the imprisoned Japanese in 1944. On February 1, 1943, when activating the 442nd Regimental Combat Team—a unit composed mostly of American citizens of Japanese descent living in Hawaii, he said, "No loyal citizen of the United States should be denied the democratic right to exercise the responsibilities of his citizenship, regardless of his ancestry. The principle on which this country was founded and by which it has always been governed is that Americanism is a matter of the mind and heart; Americanism is not, and never was, a matter of race or ancestry."

Interior Secretary Ickes lobbied Roosevelt through 1944 to release the Japanese American internees, but Roosevelt did not act until after the November presidential election. A fight for Japanese American civil rights meant a fight with influential Democrats, the Army, and the Hearst press and would have endangered Roosevelt's chances of winning California in 1944. Critics of Roosevelt's actions believe they were motivated in part by racism. In 1925 Roosevelt had written about Japanese immigration: "Californians have properly objected on the sound basic grounds that Japanese immigrants are not capable of assimilation into the American population... Anyone who has traveled in the Far East knows that the mingling of Asiatic blood with European and American blood produces, in nine cases out of ten, the most unfortunate results". In 1944, the U.S. Supreme Court upheld the legality of the executive order in the Korematsu v. United States case. The executive order remained in force until December of that year.

== The Holocaust and attitudes toward Jews ==
=== Persecuted Jews outside the US ===
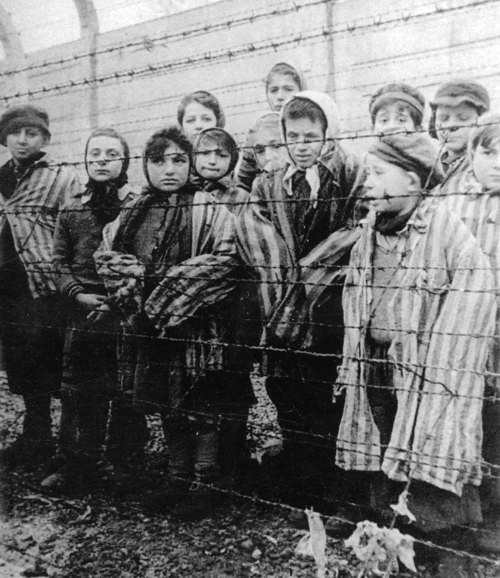
Children in the Holocaust

During his first term, Roosevelt condemned Hitler's persecution of German Jews. However, in the years leading up to US entry in World War II, the Roosevelt administration "ruled out political protest on behalf of Jews facing mounting persecution in Germany".

Even in 1944, when US public opinion was strongly in favor of admitting an unlimited number of Jewish refugees, Roosevelt prevented even the existing immigration quotas from being filled by Jews. Roosevelt also undermined plans to resettle Jewish refugees in the Dominican Republic and U.S. Virgin Islands, viewing these countries as too close to the US.

In practice very few Jewish refugees came to the U.S.—only 22,000 German refugees were admitted in 1940, not all of them Jewish. The State Department official in charge of refugee issues, Breckinridge Long, insisted on following the highly restrictive immigration laws to the letter. As one example, in 1939, the State Department under Roosevelt did not allow a boat of Jews fleeing from the Nazis into the United States. When the passenger ship St. Louis approached the coast of Florida with nearly a thousand German Jews fleeing persecution by Hitler, Roosevelt did not respond to telegrams from passengers requesting asylum, and the State Department refused entry to the ship. Forced to return to Antwerp, many of the passengers eventually died in concentration camps.

After the Allied conquest of North Africa in 1942, Roosevelt chose to retain the antisemitic Vichy leadership in power there, with some Jews remaining held in concentration camps, and discriminatory laws against Jews remaining in effect. In private Roosevelt argued that Jews did not need the right to vote since no elections were expected to be held soon, and that Jewish participation in the professions should be limited via a quota system. Only after an outcry from Jewish organizations in the US did Roosevelt change its policy regarding North African Jews, with anti-Jewish laws remaining in effect for 10 months after the US conquest.

=== Attitudes to Jews in the U.S. ===
Some of his closest political associates, such as Felix Frankfurter, Bernard Baruch and Samuel I. Rosenman, were Jewish. He appointed Henry Morgenthau Jr. as the first Jewish Secretary of the Treasury and appointed Frankfurter to the Supreme Court. Historian Doris Kearns Goodwin cites statistics showing that FDR's high level executive appointments favored Jews (15% of his top appointments at a time when Jews represented 3% of the U.S. population) which subjected Roosevelt to frequent criticism. The August, 1936 edition of "The White Knight" published an article referring to the New Deal as the "Jew Deal." Pamphlets appeared such as "What Every Congressman Should Know" in 1940 (featuring a sketch of the Capitol building with a Star of David atop its dome) that proclaimed that the Jews were in control of the American government. Financier and FDR confidant Bernard Baruch was called the "Unofficial President" in the antisemitic literature of the time. The periodical Liberation, for example, accused FDR of loading his government with Jews.

At the same time, Roosevelt expressed racist attitudes towards Jews, both in public and private. As a Harvard administrator in 1923, he helped institute a quota for Jewish students. According to historian Rafael Medoff, "Roosevelt's unflattering statements about Jews consistently reflected one of several interrelated notions: that it was undesirable to have too many Jews in any single profession, institution, or geographic locale; that America was by nature, and should remain, an overwhelmingly white, Protestant country; and that Jews on the whole possessed certain innate and distasteful characteristics." Medoff also noted in a 2016 article for the Jewish Ledger that as a child, Roosevelt's grandson Curtis would often hear his grandfather telling antisemitic stories in the White House, with the Jewish characters being Lower East Side people with heavy accents.
