= List of people from East St. Louis, Illinois =

The following list includes notable people who were born or have lived in East St. Louis, Illinois. For a similar list organized alphabetically by last name, see the category page People from East St. Louis, Illinois.

== Authors and academics ==
Name	Image	Birth	Death	Known for	Association	Reference
Walter J. Boyne		Feb 2, 1929	Jan 9, 2020	US Air Force colonel; author; director of the National Air and Space Museum	Grew up in East St. Louis	
Cecile Hoover Edwards		Oct 26, 1926	Sep 17, 2005	Nutrition researcher, Howard University dean	Born in East St. Louis	
Harry Edwards		Nov 22, 1942		Professor emeritus of Sociology at the University of California, Berkeley; former consultant to the San Francisco 49ers	Born in East St. Louis	
Eugene B. Redmond		Dec 1, 1937		Academic and city poet laureate; established the Eugene B. Redmond Writers Club	Lived in East St. Louis	
Daniel A. Vallero		Sep 5, 1953		Research scientist; author; adjunct professor of engineering at Duke University	Born in East St. Louis	

== Business, science and engineering ==
Name	Image	Birth	Death	Known for	Association	Reference
Keith Brendley		1958		Expert in active protection systems, founder of Artis	Born in East St. Louis	
Dorothy Davis Locanthi		Apr 19, 1913	Sep 27, 1999	Astronomer	Born and raised in East St. Louis	
Albert Frankel		March 1, 1868	July 27, 1957	Architect	Lived in East St. Louis for nearly 70 years.	

== Media and arts ==
Name	Image	Birth	Death	Known for	Association	Reference
Erin Brown (a.k.a. Misty Mundae)		Oct 16, 1979		Horror film actress, model, filmmaker	Born in East St. Louis	
Comethazine		Jul 6, 1998		Rapper and songwriter	Born in East St. Louis	
Miles Davis		May 26, 1926	Sep 28, 1991	Jazz musician, recipient of Grammy Lifetime Achievement Award	Grew up in East St. Louis	
William Dollar		Apr 20, 1907	Feb 28, 1986	Ballet dancer and choreographer	Grew up in East St. Louis	
Katherine Dunham		Jun 22, 1909	May 21, 2006	Dancer, choreographer, anthropologist and author	Lived in East St. Louis	
Dorothy Gish		March 11, 1898	June 4, 1968	Actress	Lived in East St. Louis	
Lillian Gish		Oct 14, 1893	Feb 27, 1993	Actress	Lived in East St. Louis	
Russell Gunn		Oct 20, 1971		Composer, arranger, recording artist, Grammy-nominated jazz musician	Grew up in East St. Louis	
Rose Marion		1875	1947	Newspaper feature writer		
Brother Joe May		Nov 9, 1912	Jul 14, 1972	Gospel singer	Lived in East St. Louis	
Barbara Ann Teer		Jun 18, 1937	Jul 21, 2008	Writer, producer, actress and teacher; founder of the National Black Theater in Harlem (1968)	Born in East St. Louis	
Ike Turner		Nov 5, 1931	Dec 12, 2007	Musician, bandleader, songwriter, talent scout, and record producer; inducted into Rock and Roll Hall of Fame	Lived in East St. Louis	
Tina Turner		Nov 26, 1939	May 24, 2023	Singer and actress; inducted into Rock and Roll Hall of Fame and recipient of Grammy Lifetime Achievement Award	Lived in East St. Louis	
Lee Wilde		Oct 9, 1922	Sep 7, 2015	Part of twin sister singing act The Wilde Twins	Born in East St. Louis	
Lyn Wilde		Oct 10, 1922	Sep 11, 2016	Part of twin sister singing act The Wilde Twins	Born in East St. Louis	
Steamboat Willie		1951		Veteran musician of Dixieland, jazz and ragtime music; considered a New Orleans "institution"	Born in East St. Louis	
Robert Wrigley		1951		Poet	Born in East St. Louis	

=== Bands ===
Name	Image	Founded	Disbanded	Music	Association	Reference
Unladylike		2002		Hip hop duo	Formed in East St. Louis	

== Politics ==
Name	Image	Birth	Death	Known for	Association	Reference
Marcia Anderson		1957		First female African-American major general in US Army; bankruptcy clerk, 7th District U.S. Court of Appeals	Finished school in East St. Louis	
John Baricevic				Chief Judge, 12th Judicial District of Illinois		
William D. Becker		Oct 23, 1876	Aug 1, 1943	Mayor of St. Louis 1941–43	Born in East St. Louis	
Jerry Costello		Sep 25, 1949		U.S. representative for Illinois	Born in East St. Louis	
Dick Durbin		Nov 21, 1944		U.S. senator for Illinois	Born in East St. Louis	
Victor Gold		Sep 25, 1928	Jun 5, 2017	Journalist, political consultant	Born in East St. Louis; reared in New Orleans, Louisiana	
Donald McHenry		Oct 13, 1936		US Ambassador to the United Nations (1979 to 1981)	Grew up in East St. Louis	
Wyvetter H. Younge		Aug 23, 1930	Dec 26, 2008	Member of the Illinois House of Representatives from the 114th District (1975–2008)		

== Sports ==
=== Baseball ===
Name	Image	Birth	Death	Known for	Association	Reference
Jim Adams		1868		Baseball player for the St. Louis Browns (1890)	Born in East St. Louis	
Hank Bauer		Jul 31, 1922	Feb 9, 2007	Right fielder and manager for the New York Yankees, Kansas City Athletics, Baltimore Orioles, and Oakland Athletics; eight-time World Series Champion, three-time All-Star	Born in East St. Louis	
Steve Biras		Feb 26, 1917	Apr 21, 1965	Second baseman for the Cleveland Indians, batted 1.000	Born in East St. Louis	
Ed Blake		Dec 23, 1925	Apr 15, 2009	Pitcher for the Cincinnati Reds and Kansas City Athletics	Graduated high school in East St. Louis	
Jim Bruske		Oct 7, 1964		Pitcher for the Los Angeles Dodgers, San Diego Padres, New York Yankees, and Milwaukee Brewers	Born in East St. Louis	
Homer Bush		Nov 12, 1972		Second baseman for the New York Yankees, Toronto Blue Jays and Florida Marlins; World Series champion	Born in East St. Louis	
Billy Colgan				Catcher for the Pittsburgh Alleghenys	Born in East St. Louis	
Terry Hanson		Jun 16, 1947		Sports executive for the Atlanta Braves, PGA Tour, and NBA TV	Born in East St. Louis	
Ernie Hickman		1856	Nov 19, 1891	Pitcher for the Kansas City Cowboys	Born and died in East St. Louis	
Sam Jethroe		Jan 20, 1918	Jun 18, 2001	Center fielder for the Boston Braves and Pittsburgh Pirates; awarded NL Rookie of the Year (1950)	Born in East St. Louis	
Jerry Kane		Jul 21, 1866	Oct 27, 1948	Pitcher for the St. Louis Browns	Born in East St. Louis	
Scott Little		Jan 19, 1963		Outfielder for the Pittsburgh Pirates	Born in East St. Louis	
Frank Millard		Jul 4, 1865	Jul 4, 1892	Second baseman for the St. Louis Browns	Born in East St. Louis	
Salty Parker		Jul 8, 1912	Jul 27, 1992	Infielder for the Detroit Tigers	Born in East St. Louis	
Hank Schmulbach		Jan 17, 1925	May 3, 2001	Pinch runner for the St. Louis Browns	Born in East St. Louis	
Fleury Sullivan		1862	Feb 8, 1897	Pitcher for the Pittsburgh Alleghenys (1884)	Born in East St. Louis	
Bill Walker		Oct 7, 1903	Jun 14, 1966	Pitcher for the New York Giants and St. Louis Cardinals	Born in East St. Louis	
Joe Wallis		Jan 9, 1952		Outfielder for the Chicago Cubs and Oakland Athletics	Born in East St. Louis	
John Ward		1862	Aug 2, 1899	Pitcher for the Providence Grays	Born in East St. Louis	
Johnny Wyrostek		Jul 12, 1919	Dec 12, 1986	Center fielder for the Pittsburgh Pirates, Philadelphia Phillies, and Cincinnati Reds; two time All-Star (1950, 1951)		

=== Basketball ===
Name	Image	Birth	Death	Known for	Association	Reference
LaPhonso Ellis		May 5, 1970		Power forward for the Denver Nuggets, Atlanta Hawks, Minnesota Timberwolves, and Miami Heat	Born in East St. Louis	
Cuonzo Martin		Sep 23, 1971		Played for the Vancouver Grizzlies and Milwaukee Bucks; head coach of University of Missouri, Tennessee men's basketball teams	Born in East St. Louis	
Darius Miles		Oct 9, 1981		Small and power forward for the Los Angeles Clippers, Cleveland Cavaliers, Portland Trail Blazers, and Memphis Grizzlies	Attended East St. Louis Senior High School	

=== Football ===
Name	Image	Birth	Death	Known for	Association	Reference
Bryan Cox		Feb 17, 1968		Linebacker for five National Football League teams; Super Bowl champion (XXXVI); major philanthropist for East St. Louis High School	Attended East St. Louis High School	
Kerry Glenn		Jan 3, 1962		Cornerback for the New York Jets and Miami Dolphins	Born in East St. Louis, Illinois	
James Harris		May 13, 1968		Defensive end for the Seattle Seahawks, Minnesota Vikings, St. Louis Rams, and Oakland Raiders	Born in East St. Louis, Illinois	
Terry Hawthorne		Jan 1, 1990		Cornerback for the Pittsburgh Steelers	Born in East St. Louis, Illinois	
Dana Howard		Feb 27, 1972		Linebacker for the Dallas Cowboys, St. Louis Rams, and Chicago Bears	Born in East St. Louis, Illinois	
Shelby Jordan		Jan 23, 1952		Offensive tackle for the New England Patriots, and the LA Raiders; Super Bowl champion (XVII)	Attended East St. Louis High School	
Mike Magac		May 25, 1938	Aug 25, 2003	Guard for the San Francisco 49ers and Pittsburgh Steelers	Born in East St. Louis, Illinois	
Montez Murphy		Jan 6, 1982		Free agent for the Kansas City Chiefs	Attended East St. Louis High School	
Damien Nash		Apr 14, 1982		Running back for the Tennessee Titans and the Denver Broncos	Attended East St. Louis High School	
Kellen Winslow		Nov 5, 1957		Hall of fame tight end for the San Diego Chargers	Attended East St. Louis High School	
Eric C. Wright		Apr 18, 1959		All-Pro cornerback for the San Francisco 49ers; four-time Super Bowl champion (XVI, XIX, XXIII, XXIV)	Born in East St. Louis, Illinois	

=== Tennis ===
Name	Image	Birth	Death	Known for	Association	Reference
Jimmy Connors		September 2, 1952		Player with most match wins	Grew up in East St. Louis	

=== Track and field ===
Name	Image	Birth	Death	Known for	Association	Reference
Dawn Harper		May 13, 1984		Olympic gold medalist in 100 meter hurdles at the 2008 Beijing Olympic Games	Born in East St. Louis	
Al Joyner		Jan 19, 1960		Track Olympic gold medalist in triple jump at the 1984 Summer Olympics; brother of Jackie Joyner-Kersee	Born in East St. Louis	
Jackie Joyner-Kersee		Mar 3, 1962		Ranked among all-time greatest athletes in women's heptathlon and long jump; winner of six Olympic medals and four world championships	Born in East St. Louis	

=== Mixed martial arts ===
Name	Image	Birth	Death	Known for	Association	Reference
Houston Alexander		March 22, 1972		Mixed martial artist for the Ultimate Fighting Championship	Born in East St. Louis	
