= Kozol =

Kozol is a surname. Notable people with this surname include:

- Harry Kozol (1906–2008), American neurologist
- Jonathan Kozol (born 1936), American writer, educator, and activist
