= East St. Louis Senior High School =

Public high school in East St. Louis, Illinois, United States

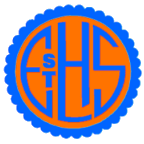

Location
- 4901 State Street; East St. Louis, Illinois 62205; United States; 38°36′31″N 90°06′12″W

Information
- Type: Public
- Established: 1865
- School district: East Saint Louis Public Schools
- Principal: Brittany Green
- Teaching staff: 85.00 (FTE)
- Grades: 9–12
- Enrollment: 1,261 (2023–2024)
- Student to teacher ratio: 14.84
- Colors: Orange and royal blue
- Slogan: All gas, No breaks
- Sports: Basketball (men's & women's), Football, Wrestling, Volleyball (men's & women’s) Cheerleading, Track & Field (men's & women's), Baseball, Softball, Tennis
- Mascot: Airplane
- Team name: Flyers/Flyerettes
- Website: eastside.estl189.com

East Saint Louis Senior High School is the only high school in East St. Louis, Illinois. The school serves about 1,438 students in grades 9 to 12 in the East Saint Louis Public Schools district. It was featured in the Jonathan Kozol book Savage Inequalities. In 1998, East St. Louis Lincoln High School consolidated with East St. Louis High.

In addition to East St. Louis, the district (this is the sole comprehensive high school of the district) also includes portions of Canteen, Centreville, and Stites Townships in northwestern St. Clair County. The district also includes all of Washington Park, much of Alorton and Centreville, and portions of Belleville, Caseyville, Fairmont City, Fairview Heights, and Madison.

== Sports ==
East St. Louis Senior High School won the 2008 Class 7A football state championship against Geneva High School. The Flyers have a storied history in Illinois high school football, having won the state championship over a half-dozen times and the national championship twice. The Flyers beat Prairie Ridge in 2022 for the Class 6A football title. From 1976 to the beginning of the 1995 season, the Flyers' coach was Bob Shannon. Two years of Flyers football during that period were the subject of a book, The Right Kind of Heroes.

The Flyers compete in the Southwestern Conference.

== Notable alumni ==
- Hank Bauer, former MLB right fielder (New York Yankees, Kansas City Athletics) and manager (Kansas City Athletics, Baltimore Orioles); 8x World Series champion; member of Baltimore Orioles Hall of Fame.
- Tom Bayless, former NFL offensive and defensive lineman
- Ed Blake, former MLB pitcher for the Cincinnati Reds and the Kansas City Athletics
- Rose Marion Boylan, (ca. 1875–1947) known professionally as Rose Marion, newspaper reporter and clubwoman
- Walter Boyne, author of 32 books and 500 articles about aviation; was the director of the National Air & Space Museum
- Luther Burden III, NFL wide receiver for the Chicago Bears
- Homer Bush, former MLB second baseman; 1998 World Series Champion
- Don Choate, former MLB pitcher
- Jimmy Connors, tennis Hall of Famer
- Brandon Henderson, college football offensive lineman for the University of Illinois football
- Bryan Cox, former NFL linebacker; NFL assistant coach
- Cleveland Crosby, former NFL defensive end
- Al Dixon, former NFL tight end
- William Dollar, one of the nation's leading performers in the terpsichorean art of ballet
- Thomas L. Fekete, Illinois state representative and lawyer
- Larry Gladney, Professor of Physics, Yale University, New Haven, Connecticut
- Kerry Glenn, former NFL cornerback
- Dawn Harper-Nelson, Olympic hurdler; gold medalist in 100-meter hurdles at 2008 Summer Olympics
- James Harris, former NFL defensive end
- Dana Howard, former NFL linebacker; 1994 Dick Butkus Award winner; 2017 College Football Hall of Fame inductee.
- Sam Jethroe, oldest baseball player to win "Rookie of the Year" award with the Boston Braves
- Antonio Johnson, current NFL defensive back
- Shelby Jordan, former NFL offensive tackle for the New England Patriots and the Los Angeles Raiders
- Bennie Lewis, small forward for Frankston Blues of Australia's SEABL
- Keontez Lewis, college football wide receiver for the Oklahoma Sooners
- Dominic Lovett, football player
- Jean Madeira, opera mezzo-soprano.
- Joe May, gospel singer known as the "Thunderbolt of the Midwest"Jackie
- Darius Miles, class of 2000, former NBA power forward
- Montez Murphy, former NFL defensive tackle
- Damien Nash, former NFL running back
- Toriano Pride, college football defensive back for the Clemson Tigers and the Missouri Tigers
- Al Randolph, former NFL defensive back
- Victor Scott, former NFL defensive back
- Dennis Stallings, former NFL linebacker
- Bob Turley, former MLB pitcher; 1958 Cy Young Award winner, World Series MVP, and AL wins leader.
- Bill Walker, former MLB pitcher with the New York Giants and St. Louis Browns; 2× NL ERA leader.
- Johnny Wyrostek, former MLB outfielder; 2× MLB All-Star with Cincinnati Reds
- Marion Lee Wilde, class of 1939, one of the Wilde Twins. Movie actress 1942–1949
- Mary Lynn Wilde, class of 1939, one of the Wilde Twins. Movie actress 1942–1953
- Kellen Winslow, class of 1975, former NFL tight end for San Diego Chargers; Pro Football and College Football Hall of Fame inductee
