= The Shame of the Nation =

Book by Jonathan Kozol

The Shame of the Nation: The Restoration of Apartheid Schooling in America
- Author: Jonathan Kozol
- Language: English
- Genre: Nonfiction
- Publisher: Random House
- Publication date: September 13, 2005
- Publication place: United States
- Media type: Print (hardback & paperback)
- Pages: 416 pp
- ISBN: 1-4000-5244-0
- OCLC: 58789392
- Dewey Decimal: 379.2/63/0973 22
- LC Class: LC212.62 .K69 2005

The Shame of the Nation: The Restoration of Apartheid Schooling in America is a 2005 book by educator and author Jonathan Kozol. It describes how, in the United States, black and Hispanic students tend to be concentrated in schools where they make up almost the entire student body.

Kozol visited nearly 60 public schools in preparation for writing the book. He found that conditions had grown worse for inner-city children in the 50 years since the Supreme Court in the landmark ruling of Brown v. Board of Education dismantled the previous policy of de jure segregated schools and their concept of "separate but equal". In many cities, wealthier white families continued to leave the city to settle in suburbs, with minorities comprising most of the families left in the public school system. In the book Kozol quotes Gary Orfield of the Harvard Graduate School of Education, who says, "American public schools are now 12 years into the process of continuous resegregation. ... During the 1990s, the proportion of black students in majority white schools has decreased ... to a level lower than in any year since 1968." In a separate quote from Gary Orfield in a letter to AllArtsAllKids.org, he mentions that, "the country clearly has had enough of the drill, kill, test & punish, and learn only two subjects style of NCLB reform...".

In his earlier books, like Amazing Grace, Kozol wrote that the schools of the South Bronx were stunningly segregated. But in the last five years, Kozol said that he "... realized how sweeping this change has been throughout the nation, and how reluctant the media is to speak of it." Newspapers he says "... refuse to see what is in their own front yard ... in a description of a 98 percent black and Latino school, the newspaper won't say what would seem to be the most obvious starting point: This is a deeply segregated school. They won't use the word 'segregated.'"

In the book, Kozol attacks the disparity in expenditures on education between central cities and well-to-do suburbs, and the system of property taxes which most school systems and states rely on for funding. He expresses outrage at inequities in expenditure, pointing out that New York City in 2002-3 spent $11,627 on the education of each child, while in Nassau County, the town of Manhasset spent $22,311, and Great Neck $19,705. He found that there are comparable disparities in other metropolitan areas, since most funding is locally based. Kozol describes schools that are separated by a 15-minute drive but that offer vastly different educational opportunities. In one example, a primarily white school offers drama club and AP classes, and the nearby primarily black school requires classes like hairdressing.

== Chapter summaries ==
=== Chapter 1: Dishonoring the Dead ===
In the first chapter of this text, Kozol examines the current state of segregation within the urban school system. He begins with a discussion on the irony stated in the above quote: schools named after leaders of the integration struggle are some of the most segregated schools, such as the Thurgood Marshall Elementary School in Seattle, Washington (95% minority) or a school named after Rosa Parks in San Diego, California (80% minority). Kozol notes that most of the students within these schools are unfamiliar with the actions of the minority leaders their schools are named after. Kozol goes on to point out the lack of segregation within the urban communities that surround these schools, specifically mentioning the residential segregation on New York City, which matches levels from the 1960s.

=== Chapter 2: Hitting Them Hardest When They're Small ===
In chapter 2, Kozol describes the hardships students of color experience in segregated schools. Students of color have limited resources and support from the educational system. Students concerns were devalued and little consideration is given to help fund their schools. As opposed to affluent families they were able to provide an education for their children. Programs were available for those who could afford to pay children education. Baby Ivy is a private educational program that taught children of early age to receive the proper education they need. Children who had a head start in school had more positive educational outcomes than disadvantage children.

=== Chapter 3: The Ordering Regime ===
Kozol examines the strategy of "one size fits all" within urban public schools. Scripted programs such as 'Success for All' drive curriculum changes, using models adapted from industrial efficiency and Taylorism. In addition, Kozol discusses the naming ritual that permeates the formality of each course taught by the school. Such examples include 'Authentic Writing', 'Active Listening', 'Accountable Talk', and 'Zero Noise'. Teachers in urban school are strongly encouraged to follow these scripted lessons to bring formality and structure to the learning environment. This order is driven by state testing, which leads to anxiety among schoolchildren when their reading level is announced. Students are scored from Level One (lowest) to Level Four (highest), which places them into categories for further instruction. However, these placement scores are used as descriptive terms among students; 'He's a level one', or 'She's gone down to a level two'.

=== Chapter 4: Preparing Minds for Market ===
Within this chapter, Kozol continues to look at the curriculum shifts found in urban schools, which are nowhere to be seen in more affluent suburban schools. Increasingly, teachers are encouraged to weave 'work-related' themes into the lessons throughout the day. This trend starts at the elementary school level with 'Help Wanted' signs, classroom jobs labeled as 'managers', and students keep 'earnings-tracking' charts on their desks. Learning itself, is further taught as a 'possession' and not something one 'engages' with. The influence of managerial thinking continues into urban high schools, where students are strongly encouraged to select a 'career path' during their freshman year, so they may tailor their course work. Among the choices not marketed is a college education. The curriculum additions are often influenced by local corporations and business leaders. Kozol points out that many of these corporations place great importance on 'team players', and the walls of urban school classrooms are plastered with corporate brands and managerial themes.

=== Chapter 5: The Road to Rome ===
In this chapter, Kozol looks into the damaging effects of high-stakes tests, specifically on inner-city children who are almost destined to fail as a result of limited resources. In these schools, drastic and specific measures are taken to raise scores, usually at the expense of any freedom or flexibility in the curriculum. The schools adopt blanket teaching materials that have been compared to military manuals.

Kozol also calls attention to the negative physiological effects these tests have on the children who take them. In L.A., standardized tests are given to children as young as 5 or 6, who without strong reading skills become frustrated to the point of crying and wetting their pants. Furthermore, the children who do not perform to standard are being forced to repeat multiple grades, which increase the likelihood that the student will drop out by 90%.

The subjects that are not included in these high-stakes tests, such as geography, history, and science are no longer being taught, consequently lowering the quality of education for students in low performing schools. Music, art, and recess, and even portions of the summer break are also being excluded in order to maximize test preparation time.

=== Chapter 6: A Hardening of Lines ===
In this chapter, Kozol examines the increasing separation between the children of the privileged and the children of minorities. For years, the better school districts in New York have been more accessible to knowledgeable, "savvy" parents who know that applications to these schools must be filed a year early. These applications usually call for an understanding of a contract, and a written "educational philosophy", two things that would be near impossible for an illiterate or non-English speaking parent to complete. The competition for the best, most acclaimed schools is cut throat and minority parents are usually unprepared or unaware of such competition.

In conclusion to the chapter, Kozol describes a microcosmic example in the Roosevelt School District of New York. A proposal was made to dissolve the impoverished, mostly minority district and absorb the small number of students into the surrounding school district, East Meadow, with a mostly white student population. This proposal went through initially but was met with outrage by the East Meadow community and was eventually overturned. Kozol views this as a missed "opportunity to end the education apartheid of a small community of children".

=== Chapter 7: Excluding Beauty ===
In this chapter, Kozol reveals the poor conditions and state of disrepair many of the segregated schools are now in. The physical appearance of these schools negatively impacts the students desire to be in school and the way that they feel while they are present. Kozol talks about how there is no misery index in place even though there should be. In Oklahoma City, for example, the schools are overcrowded, lined with insufficient trailers that were not heated or cooled and often leak. In California, the overcrowding was so severe that students had to attend schools in monthly shifts year round. Some schools lack even the basic supplies such as textbooks, chairs, and desks for their students. Many students do not even attempt to eat lunch because the cafeteria is so over-crowded and the lines are so long.

This lack of space and resources takes a toll on the variety and quality of courses that are offered. One student describes her desire to go to college and take AP classes, but without the teachers or space, she must instead take the courses already offered such as sewing and hair braiding.

=== Chapter 8: False Promises ===
In this chapter, Kozol describes his experience working as a teacher in New York during the implementation of Higher Horizons in the 1960s. This program was designed to increase spending per child in segregated schools while also training teachers to increase their expectations. The program claimed to improve reading and math skills, lower suspension rates, and improve relations with parents. As the program began to work, money was reduced, and this quick reduction resulted in the abandonment of Higher Horizons after 7 years. While briefly successful, the promises of the program fell through.

The high expectations placed on new superintendents and personnel also bring false hope. The pressures of the cities they are placed in and the low achievement of the students make the turnover rate in these positions so high that it becomes impossible to achieve long-term goals.

"The right of transfer" was a provision introduced in this chapter that gave off a false hope for children of poor people to attend well off schools that were available to middle-class communities. However, such schools were scarce and the requirements the students needed to meet to attend these schools were challenging and children who lived in the middle class communities had priority over any poor child attempting to attend their school.

Kozol states that he does not believe a good school or a good school system can be built on miracles or on the stunning interventions of dramatically original charismatic men or women.

=== Chapter 9: Invitations to Resistance ===
Chapter 9 begins offering some answers to that question. Using the words of Jack White, a writer at Time magazine, Kozol begins by examining the need for a broad political movement. "Herewith...a radical proposal...Revive the civil rights movement, which went into limbo long before some of its most important goals were accomplished..." (Kozol, 2005, p. 216). his argument is more fully explored in the epilogue. Next, Kozol reports on the efforts of teachers and principals to resist the strengthening of segregation in public schools.

In the second half of the chapter several examples of successful desegregation (e.g. Prince Edward County, Virginia) are discussed. Kozol emphasized that while there are successes, they are fragile at best with many integration programs across the state being threatened.

=== Chapter 10: A National Horror Hidden in Plain View ===
In this chapter Kozol explores the United States legal system as an option for combating apartheid schooling. Local, state, and federal courts cases have attempted to bring desegregation and equality to public schools in many different parts of the country. Kozol explores both successful (e.g. Brown vs. Board of Education) and unsuccessful attempts (e.g. San Antonio Independent School District v. Rodriguez). Overall Kozol's analysis presents evidence (through several key cases) that the courts have been either unwilling or unable to correct the issue.

The remainder of the chapter addresses the legislative branch's attempts to correct the problem. Kozol discusses both Congressman Fattah's bill and Congressman Jesse Jackson Jr.'s proposal for a constitutional amendment. Neither effort has been met with much success.

=== Chapter 11: Deadly Lies ===
"I went to Washington to challenge the soft bigotry of low expectations," the president said again in his re-election in September 2004. "It's working. It's making a difference." It is one of those deadly lies which by sheer repetition, is at length accepted by large numbers of Americans…

— Kozol, 2005, p. 284

From the legislative branch Kozol moves to the executive. By reviewing the impact of No Child Left Behind and high-stakes achievement tests, this chapter further demonstrates the increasing imbalance in quality of public schools. The basic argument presented in the book is that no matter how much students are told they can succeed and how much educators teach to the test, schools that have inadequate funding will inevitably suffer. According to Kozol the largely Republican controlled presidency of the last 28 years has further segregated American schools through a failed education policy.

The rest of the chapter focuses on "standard-based reform" and the small school initiative (see Deborah Meier, The power of their ideas: Lessons for America from a small school in Harlem) in relation to school segregation. Kozol argues that the "standards-based reform" is an effort to address the scoring gap between high and low socio-economic schools through the use of positive thinking and sheer willpower. This strategy is shown to be occasionally successful in the extreme short term, but ultimately unsuccessful in the long run. In other words, scores would often improve for the particular test being studied for, but the competency of the students did not improve. As for the small school initiative, Kozol is generally supportive of the idea but is critical when it amounts to many smaller segregated learning institutions around the nation.

=== Chapter 12: Treasured Places ===
Kozol's last chapter is devoted to showcase examples of excellence that he witnessed in his visits to schools in America's most segregated schools. Examples such as Mr. Bedrock (an elementary teacher in one of New York's most segregated schools) and Miss Rosa (the principal of the same school, PS. 30) demonstrate that even in the worst of situations there is still hope.

== See also ==
- Auto-segregation
- Black school
- Savage Inequalities
