= Self-segregation =

Form of social exclusion

Self-segregation or auto-segregation is the separation of a religious, ethnic, or racial group from other groups in a country by the group itself naturally. This usually results in decreased social interactions between different ethnic, racial or religious groups and can be classed as a form of social exclusion.

== Recurring patterns in countries affected by self-segregation ==
=== Residential segregation ===
As self-segregation begins to appear, residents of different ethnic, racial or religious background begin to separate from each other and live in different areas in large concentrations.

=== Rural and urban divide ===
In some countries affected by self-segregation, there exists a divide among racial groups in rural areas and in urban areas of a country. This trend is most commonly seen in countries affected by White demographic decline and is usually an occurrence of white flight from inner city areas and then outer city suburbs as these places become more ethnically diverse and heterogeneous to more whiter rural areas.

=== School segregation ===
Typically as segregation begins to appear schools end up becoming segregated on ethnic and religious lines.

=== Ethnic communalism ===
Self-segregation and segregation in general sometimes escalates into inter-ethnic violence between different ethnic, racial or religious groups. Instances of this can be seen worldwide in places which have a degree of ethnic or religious diversity within them, famous examples of this are the Troubles and sectarian conflict in Iraq between Sunnis and Shias and general religiously motivated riots in South Asia and Africa, especially in India and Nigeria.

== Self-segregation in countries ==
=== India ===
In India, religious self-segregation exists between mainly the Hindu majority in the country and the large Muslim minority.

=== Sweden ===
According to researcher Emma Neuman at Linnaeus University, segregation sets in at population share around 3-4% of non-European migrants in a district, while European immigration shows no such trend. The study comprised the 12 largest municipalities of Sweden for the period 1990–2007. High income earners and highly educated move out of non-European migrant districts first where ethnic segregation in turn leads to social segregation.

A study at Örebro University concluded that while Swedish parents stated positive views towards the values of multiculturalism, in practice they still chose Swedish-majority schools for their children, such that they would not become an ethnic minority during their formative years and in order to stay within an environment to develop their native Swedish language.

=== United Kingdom ===
In Bradford, different ethnic groups live in 'parallel lives' to each other and the city is largely ethnically and religiously self-segregated. Image shown is the proportion of the White British population in 2011 in Bradford

Self-segregation in the United Kingdom has been increasing in recent decades as the White British population has declined overall nationally, increasing in the years between 2001 and 2011 as immigration has increased to the country and the speed of demographic decline for the White British has sped up. In large towns and cities for example the White population has largely began migrating out of ethnically diverse heterogeneous urban areas and have begun to self-segregate in whiter rural areas. Muslim migrants to the country also have high rates of endogamy, for example it is estimated that around 55% of British Pakistanis are married to their first cousins. These groups typically segregate away from other ethnic and religious groups via the use of religious faith schools. For example, in the London Borough of Tower Hamlets in the East End, around 60% of White students in the Borough attend White majority schools while 17 primary schools had more than 90% Bangladeshi pupils while 9 schools had less than 10%.

Calls for action against this trend have increased in volume since the 2001 race riots in Bradford and Oldham, where racial segregation is present as well. The Cantle Report of 2001 outlined that different communities were living 'parallel lives' which advocated for 'community cohesion' strategies to promote integration. The Casey Report in 2016, which preceded after the Cantle Report fifteen years prior suggested a similar outlook to the previous report that segregation was still at 'worrying levels'.

In 2023, according to research published by Queen's University Belfast, England and Wales have been becoming more diverse and less ethnically segregated over time, following an in-depth analysis of 2021 Census data.

==== Bradford ====
In Bradford, self-segregation between the prominent Muslim minority in the city and the White British population exists at large and was a factor behind the race riots in 2001.

=== United States ===
Self-segregation is on the rise in the United States, being mostly influenced by White demographic decline in the country which is more prevalent than in other white-majority societies worldwide (57% of the country as of 2020 is Non-Hispanic White). In 2018, research by the University of Illinois and sociologist Mary Krysan found that while Whites, Blacks and Hispanics in the United States stated that the ideal neighbourhood that they liked was racially diverse, most ended up living in neighbourhoods in which their racial group was the majority. However, this differed from racial group to racial group on how much of a percentage their racial group represented in their neighbourhood. While Hispanics (51% Hispanic) and Blacks (66% Black) ended up living in areas in which they were a majority, their proportional amount was significantly lower than that of whites. (74% white).

== Endogamy as self-segregation ==
Endogamy, the practice of marrying within a group, encourages group affiliation and bonding. It is a common practice among displanted cultures attempting to make roots in new countries whilst still resisting complete integration, as it encourages group solidarity and ensures greater control over group resources (which may be important to preserve when a group is attempting to establish itself within an alien culture).

However, endogamy can also serve as a form of self-segregation and helps a community to resist integrating with surrounding populations. It thus helps minorities to survive as separate communities over a long time, in societies with other practices and beliefs.

Examples of ethno-religious groups with higher levels of endogamy that have successfully resisted cultural destruction and assimilation for centuries are the Romani (colloquially referred to by non-members as "Gypsies") and the Ashkenazi Jews of Europe and the Americas.

== See also ==
- Freedom of association
- Consociationalism
- Defection
- Endogamy
- Ethnocentrism
- Hypersegregation
- Isolationism
- Parallel society
- Secession
- Separatism
- Two schools under one roof
- White flight

Books:

- Jonathan Kozol, The Shame of the Nation: The Restoration of Apartheid Schooling in America, Random House, 2005.

Interactives:

- Parable of the Polygons - a playable post on the shape of society by Nicky Case and Vi Hart
