= In Schools We Trust =

2002 book by Deborah Meier

- Author: Deborah Meier
- Language: English
- Genre: Education
- Publisher: Beacon Press
- Publication date: 2002
- Publication place: United States
- Media type: Print (Hardcover, Paperback)
- Pages: 208 pp
- ISBN: 978-0-8070-3142-1

In Schools We Trust is a book written by Deborah Meier and published on August 1, 2002. Meier uses her experiences as the founding principal of the Mission Hill School in Boston, and previous experiences leading the Central Park East schools in New York, to illustrate her vision for school reform in America. The book is broken down into three sections that focus first on the importance of building trust among the various constituencies in schools, then the challenge or threat that high-stakes standardized testing presents to building trust in schools, and finally, a broader vision for how particular systemic and policy changes could be made to increase the likelihood that schools build the trust that is necessary for schools to be effective.

== Summary ==
In the first section, she argues that the main failing of today's public schools is that students do not develop relationships with their teachers. She says that because the school system encourages a separation between a students' school life and their outside life, teachers are missing out on teaching to students' interests. Her main thesis in this section is that teachers need to focus on teaching to students' interests to help engage them in learning which, in turn, will lower drop out rates. Next, she emphasizes the need for parents to be present in their children's schools. She argues that because parents are rarely invited into schools it makes it difficult to place their trust in the school. Her hope is that if teachers and parents can join together in teaching their child that it will be much more effective. She also recognizes the inherent flaws in the educational system saying "We are-in short-perhaps the only civilization in history that organizes its youth so that the nearer they get to being adults the less and less likely they are to know any adults" Through her schools she has tried to reverse this trend and allow older students to have more personal relationships with adults and has found that these students are more likely to succeed.

She then moves into a discussion of the history of standardized tests and her experiences with them through her own teaching. She explains that because of the high anxiety that comes with state standardized testing certain ethnic communities are put at a large disadvantage. She states that lower income students are set up to fail and thus closes their window of opportunity. She argues that if the test culture continues, tests will become the only factor of success and inspiration will become vastly undervalued. The final section is her responding to the criticisms of her ideas and restating her main points. She states that each student is different and each community is different and argues that national and state politicians are not the right people to be designing curriculum. She argues that large public schools can be broken down into many small communities, which will improve overall performance. She also hopes that standardized tests are given less weight in the future since, she believes, they do not give a complete picture of each student. She closes with an answer to her main question: "For me the most important answer to the question 'why save public education?' is this: It is in schools that we learn the art of living together as citizens, and it is in public schools that we are obliged to defend the idea of a public, not only a private, interest."

== Reception ==
This book has been celebrated in the education community since its release in 2002. In one review, Bonnie Brown states that Deborah Meier is "a legendary school founder and reformer" and states that this book is "a well-written book that acknowledges the trouble and turmoil our public schools are facing with standardized testing" Brown continues to praise the book and even argues that "If other educators read this beautifully written book with an open mind, and put her concepts into practice, it can possibly revolutionize the current state of our public school system."

In another review, Milly Marmur writes that she sees the book making a strong impact. She believes it has ideas that are useful to the wider educational community and may even be able to influence the political community to create the change she hopes for. Nicholas Meier also reviewed this book in April 2005 and was also impressed with the issues that were discussed. Overall, he feels that "Meier's writing style is engaging" and states that throughout the book she presents the deepest and most profound questions that the American school system faces and presents reasonable solutions that have been shown to succeed. He also links to other authors that have praised this book, such as Jonathan Kozol, Mike Rose (educator), Publishers Weekly and Ted Sizer.

== See also ==
Join the Discussion
