= Paulo Freire and the Cold War Politics of Literacy =

Book by Andrew J. Kirkendall

- Author: Andrew J. Kirkendall
- Genre: non-fiction
- Published: 2010
- Publisher: University of North Carolina Press
- ISBN: 978-1-4696-2224-8

Paulo Freire and the Cold War Politics of Literacy is a book by historian Andrew J. Kirkendall published by the University of North Carolina Press in 2010. It discusses the involvement of Brazilian educator and critical pedagogy philosopher Paulo Freire (1921-1997) in literacy programs in Latin American during the Cold War, and analyzes the effect of politics on literacy programs. The book also details Freire's work with organizations such as the World Council of Churches and the spread of his ideas.

== Synopsis ==
This book is an analysis of Paulo Freire's work in Latin American literacy campaigns during the mid 20th century. The first chapter, "Entering History", helps set the stage for the rest of the book. It summarizes Freire's early life and the historical context of Brazil in the 1940s and 1950s. It goes on to explain how the need for improving literacy rates was becoming apparent during this time, and describes Freire's ideas regarding education and politics.

The second chapter, "The Revolution that wasn't and the Revolution that was in Brazil", describes Freire's work in the northeast of Brazil during the presidency of Joao Goulart. It describes the literacy programs that he set up in the region, particularly in Angicos, and also discusses Freire's methods of education. It explains how the issue of literacy became increasingly prominent during the 1960s due to the government's need to define itself and expanding student movements. The chapter also argues that talk of a "revolution" in Brazil, which was common on in Goulart's party, was interpreted in widely varying ways with some fearing that it could lead to communist uprisings and others believing that it simply described rapid progress towards literacy and democracy. The involvement of the United States, which tried to promote literacy through the Alliance for Progress but also was preoccupied with preventing the spread of communism, was also discussed. The chapter ends with the 1964 coup, motivated by fears of a radical Left, that deposed Goulart and forced Freire to flee the country.

"Reformist Chile, Peasant Consciousness, and the Meaning of Christian Democracy" describes Freire's time in Chile from 1964 to 1969. During this time, he served under the administration of Eduardo Frei, who made the eradication of illiteracy a central aspect of his vision for the county. This chapter argues that Freire experienced some of his most productive years in Chile due to the success of his programs in spreading literacy in the Chilean countryside. This helped him gain increased international recognition and ensured that his ideas would spread globally. However it also points out that many of the attempts to increase the political awareness of the illiterate were also designed to promote Christian Democratic views at the expense of other political parties. Frei's party also encouraged the formation of unions in rural areas in order to gain political support. By the end of the chapter the Christian Democratic party has lost much of its support despite its achievements, and failed to receive a mandate in the 1970 election. Freire, who now increasingly viewed himself as a revolutionary, left Chile.

In the fourth chapter, "Paulo Freire and the World Council of Churches", Freire travels extensively on behalf of the World Council of Churches (WCC). His brief visit to the United States, where he exchanged ideas with academics such as Jonathan Kozol and Denis Goulet, is summarized. Freire also spends time in Europe, particularly in Geneva, the base of the WCC. Freire also worked on literacy programs in many African countries, such as Angola, Guinea-Bissau, and Tanzania. This chapter also describes the influence of Freire and his ideas on the WCC, particularly his belief that education should be for "liberation and continuity". The contradictions between Freire's political ideas and his reliance on American liberals, who often disagreed with his beliefs, for funding are also pointed out. Finally, Kirkendall points out that during this period in Freire's life, he started working with single party states rather than multiparty democracies.

The fifth chapter, "The Sandinistas and the Last Utopian Experiment of the Cold War", focuses on Freire's work in Nicaragua from 1979 to 1980. It gives an overview of the history of Nicaragua starting from the rise of the Somoza family dynasty in 1936. Kirkendall then describes the rise of the Sandinista party and describes the political importance of literacy within the revolution. Many Sandinistas believed that becoming literate was an important part of the process of self transformation that defined the revolution. After the Sandinista victory, education became an important part of their agenda and a "National Literacy Crusade" was started. Freire's help was requested and he arrived in Nicaragua in October 1979. Kirkendall states that one of the most important contributions of Freire was to legitimize the Sandinista literacy campaign. He also points out that the United States contributes a large amount to the literacy campaign despite being historically opposed to the Sandinistas. The literacy campaign was partially successful, but by 1985 illiteracy rates had risen back to 20 percent. Kirkendall argues that Freire remained proud of the accomplishments of the literacy campaign.

In the last chapter, "The Long, Slow Transition to Democracy in Brazil", Freire's role in restoring democratic government in Brazil is discussed. After his return was facilitated by the 1979 Amnesty Law, Freire helped found the Workers Party. Kirkendall describes the process of democratization and describes the Freire's work as education secretary during this time. The book ends with a description of the end of the Cold War.

== Arguments ==
=== The Political Importance of Education ===
Throughout the book, Kirkendall makes the argument that politics and education significantly influenced each other in Cold War era Latin America. He claims that following the rise of Joao Goulart, "national and international dynamics turned illiteracy into a national issue of great political importance" He also argues that education itself was used by political parties as a tool to generate support. Indeed, according to Kirkendall, "the Brazilian student Left in the early 1960s considered politicizing and raising the consciousnesses of the Brazilian popular class to be a central part of their own political activity". He further claims that this phenomenon was not confined to Brazil but also manifested itself in Chile and Nicaragua. Frei's emphasis on education in the countryside, he claims, was "hardly apolitical" and probably motivated by the fact that "the Christian Democrats lagged behind the Marxist parties in organizing the industrial and mining sectors". Finally, Kirkendall claims that the United States involved itself in literacy programs for the purpose of stopping the spread of communism.

=== Influence of Paulo Freire's Ideas ===
Kirkendall argues that Freire's ideas about education have gained international importance. He points out that Freire's belief in the importance of consciousness-raising among the lower classes and his idea that the illiterate should be the agents of their own education rather than mere recipients of knowledge have influenced literacy campaigns throughout the world. To corroborate these claims, Kirkendall points out that "phraseology reminiscent of Freirean programs" was used in Nicaragua even though Freire himself spent a very limited amount of time in the country. Kirkendall also argues that Freire's ideas contained some contradictions, such as the fact that he helped implement literacy programs supposedly designed to promote democratization in one party states, therefore legitimizing undemocratic governments.

== Critical reception ==
The book has received positive reviews with many people citing its thoroughness and balanced commentary on Freire's life. Robert Arnove from Indiana University praises it as "immensely informative and engaging" and calls it "the most authoritative account of the life and times of Paulo Freire" Héctor Lindo-Fuentes also has a very positive impression of the work, praising it for "illuminating an important aspect of the Cold War" but points out that the style could be better adapted to convey a sense of the excitement of the times. Kirkendall's book also received a glowing review from Tanya Harmer from the London School of Economics and Political Science, who calls it "an impeccably researched and thoughtful book"
