= Death at an Early Age =

1967 book by Jonathan Kozol

- Title page for Death at an Early Age: The Destruction of the Hearts and Minds of Negro Children in the Boston Public Schools (1967)
- Author: Jonathan Kozol
- Language: English
- Genre: Non-fiction/Memoir
- Publisher: Houghton Mifflin
- Publication date: 1967
- Publication place: United States

Death at an Early Age: The Destruction of the Hearts and Minds of Negro Children in the Boston Public Schools (reissue ISBN 0-452-26292-5) is a book written by the American schoolteacher Jonathan Kozol and published in Boston by Houghton Mifflin in 1967. It won the U.S. National Book Award in the Science, Philosophy and Religion category.

The book describes Kozol's first year of teaching a fourth grade in one of the most overcrowded inner city schools in the Boston public school system. Kozol recounts the deeply entrenched policies of racial segregation and inequality on the part of Boston Public Schools and testifies to a crumbling infrastructure in his Roxbury, Boston, neighborhood. The "classroom" he was assigned turned out not to even be a room at all but a corner of an auditorium where other classes were also held, and one day a large window collapsed as he was teaching his class.

The book also documents the public outcry after his dismissal for teaching the Langston Hughes poem "The Ballad of the Landlord" to his reading class, which portrays the exploitation of black tenants by white landlords. The day after presenting the poem to the class an official from the school district informed him that "no literature which is not in the Course of Study can ever be read by a Boston teacher without permission from someone higher up" and he was fired from his position.

== See also ==
- Boston busing crisis
- Public education in the United States
