= FairTest =

American educational organization

The National Center for Fair & Open Testing, also known as FairTest, is an American educational policy organization that opposes standardized testing and their use in university admission.

== History ==
FairTest was founded in 1985 by leaders of civil rights and education groups to advance their view that the misuse, overuse and flaws of standardized testing practices may be detrimental to academic achievement and equal opportunity. FairTest has directed campaigns against perceived over-reliance on standardized tests, while advocating for alternatives that they claim may enhance equity and quality in education. FairTest provides related information to the public and policymakers, organizes collaborative assessment reform alliances, and provides training and support to parents, students, educators, civil rights and community organizations. The group focuses on testing in the public schools (K-12) and university admissions. Its efforts have a national focus, such as on federal testing requirements and college admissions tests (e.g., SAT and ACT), while also working with state and local testing reform activists.

== K-12 education ==
FairTest also explores kindergarten through 12th-grade assessment issues. It educates the public on their interpretation that there are negative consequences of high-stakes testing and advocates alternatives of assessing students and providing accountability. It also works to remove state and local policies that require students to pass a standardized test (one where all students take the test under reasonably similar conditions) to graduate or be promoted to the next grade. It also has many materials on alternative performance assessments and their uses for teaching and school improvement.

FairTest's focus in 2007 was reforming the federal No Child Left Behind law to make it an effective tool for school improvement, and mobilizing those who oppose the current version of NCLB to advocate for a better law. In January 2012, FairTest released a report claiming that NCLB was a failure.

Beginning in 2004, FairTest brought together more than 100 national education, civil rights, religious, disability and civic organizations to endorse a "Joint Organizational Statement on NCLB". Out of the Joint Statement came a working group called the "Forum on Educational Accountability", which developed recommendations for a new federal law that would:

- Improve schools through high-quality professional development for teachers and administrators.
- Involve parents more deeply in school improvement, and enable families to better participate in their children's education.
- Continue to assess and report student learning, but base this on multiple measures, not just test scores. Expectations for achievement would be realistic, based on rates of improvement actually achieved by schools. Targeted assistance would replace sanctions.

In 2009, FairTest created an annual award to acknowledge educational leaders who have strongly advocated for principles shared by FairTest. The award is named the "Deborah W. Meier Hero in Education Award." Recipients include Deborah Meier. Diane Ravitch, Jonathan Kozol, Michelle Fine, Karen Lewis (labor leader), Leon Botstein, Lani Guinier and Nancy Carlsson-Paige.

== University admissions ==
=== SAT optional schools ===
FairTest alleges that a standardized test (all students take the same test under the same conditions) such as the SAT or ACT "consistently under-predicts the performance of women, African-Americans, people whose first language isn't English and generally anyone who's not a good test-taker", as compared to the grades the students receive in class. As of 2024, about 80% of US colleges are SAT optional schools.

=== Other exams ===
FairTest also works to stop what they perceive as misuses of standardized admissions exams. It alleges that using these tests to award scholarships creates unfair barriers to equal opportunity and educational quality. For example, they oppose the National Merit Scholarship Corporation – a private non-profit organization that fundraises millions of dollars from individual people and businesses for college scholarships each year – using PSAT/NMSQT scores to determine the winners of National Merit Scholarships; they think the non-profit organization should instead use another method to decide who they give their money to.

== Controversy ==
In 2004, the College Board, owners of the SAT, asked FairTest to remove a detailed analysis of performance on standardized tests by race, income and sex, alleging copyright violations. FairTest refused, and the College Board backed down, claiming that an intern had written the threatening letter without authorization.

== See also ==
- 2019 college admissions bribery scandal, cheating on SAT and ACT tests
