= Thomas L. Fekete =

American lawyer and politician

Thomas Lebeau Fekete, Jr. (July 1, 1882 – November 26, 1942) was an American lawyer and politician.

Fekete was born in East St. Louis, Illinois. He went to the East St. Louis public schools and to the East St. Louis Senior High School. He received his law degree from University of Michigan Law School in 1904 and was admitted to the Illinois, Michigan, and Missouri bars. He practiced law in East St. Louis. Fekete served in the United States Army during World War I and was commissioned a major. He served on the St. Clair County Board and was chairman of the county board. He also served as the East St. Louis city attorney and as assistant corporate counsel for East St. Louis. Fekete served in the Illinois House of Representatives from 1923 to 1929 and was a Republican. Fekete died in East St. Louis, Illinois. CJ Baricevic is also from St. Clair County.
