= Mission Hill School =

School in Boston, Massachusetts (1997–2022)

Coordinates: 42°18′26.1″N 71°6′50.2″W

- 20 Child Street; Jamaica Plain, Boston, Massachusetts 02130; United States

Information
- School type: Public pilot school
- Founded: 1997; 29 years ago
- Founder: Deborah Meier
- Closed: 2022; 4 years ago
- School board: MHS Governance Board
- Authority: Boston Public Schools
- Principal: Valeria Lowe-Barehmi (at time of closure)
- Grades: PreK–8
- Gender: Coeducational
- Enrollment: 227 (2015–16)
- Education system: Progressive education Democratic education
- Language: English
- Publication: MHS News
- Affiliations: Coalition of Essential Schools
- Website: www.missionhillschool.org

The Mission Hill School was a small preK–8 public pilot school in the Mission Hill and Jamaica Plain neighborhood of Boston, Massachusetts. Founded in 1997 by Deborah Meier, Elizabeth Knox Taylor, and colleagues, the school was administered by the Boston Public Schools. Meier has publicized the school in many of her works.

== Overview ==
The Mission Hill School was a member of the Coalition of Essential Schools. The school had a diverse student body of approximately 220 students, with democratic decision-making at the school and classroom levels, a curricular focus on five democratic "Habits of Mind", school-wide thematic units, a strong emphasis on the arts, and graduation from the school upon creating and defending portfolios of student work for a panel of evaluators. Students were admitted to the school based on a lottery, within the choice system of the Boston Public Schools (with consideration given to whether families lived within the "walk zone" and whether a sibling already attended the school, among other factors). Graduates were found to achieve academic success in high school and college at high rates, and the school was studied worldwide for its methodology.

=== Publications ===
In 2002, Meier's book In Schools We Trust included substantial attention to the Mission Hill School. It argued that the current climate of high-stakes testing makes running a school like Mission Hill much more difficult. She also wrote about the school in her books, These Schools Belong to You and Me: Why We Can't Afford to Abandon Our Public Schools (co-authored with former MHS teacher Emily Gasoi), Will Standards Save Public Education? (2000) Keeping School: Letters to Families from Principals of Two Small Schools (with Ted and Nancy Sizer, 2005), Playing for Keeps: Life and Learning on a Public School Playground (with Beth Taylor and Brenda Engel, 2010), and Teaching in Themes: An Approach to Schoolwide Learning, Creating Community, and Differentiating Instruction (co-edited with Matthew Knoester, Katherine Clunis D'Andrea). The school is also the focus of the book by Matthew Knoester Democratic Education in Practice: Inside the Mission Hill School (2012), as well as the 2014 documentary "Good Morning Mission Hill," directed by Tom and Amy Valens. Mission Hill School published a periodic newsletter for the school community, including reflections by staff, students, and family members; digital copies of some issues of the newsletter are available through the Boston City Archives and the MHS website.

=== 2012 location change ===
The school was controversially moved to a different location within Boston in 2012, despite resistance from the school community.

=== 2021 lawsuit and 2022 closure ===
In 2021, the City of Boston settled a lawsuit for over $650,000 with several families regarding unaddressed sexual misconduct against their children from other students. In 2021, BPS removed several administrators and teachers from the school and took over operations after additional allegations. In 2022, following an investigation by law firm Hinckley Allen into allegations of failure to properly address bullying and sexual misconduct between students and neglecting students with disabilities, Boston Public Schools superintendent Brenda Cassellius recommended permanently closing the school at the conclusion of the 2021–2022 academic year. Mayor Michelle Wu and many city officials also voiced their support for closure. Despite organizing efforts by some family members, staff, students, and community members, on May 5, 2022, the Boston School Committee voted 5-0 (with one member abstaining and one member absent) to close the school at the end of the 2021–2022 school year in June 2022. Many Mission Hill School family members, teachers, and students criticized Boston Public Schools' lack of transparency throughout the investigation, falsehoods in the dominant narratives promoted by Boston Public Schools and local media, and the harmful impacts of the decision to close the school. Still other families were in support of the closure.
