= Terry Hawthorne =

American gridiron football player and coach (born 1990)

Southern Illinois Salukis
- Title: Cornerbacks coach

Personal information
- Born: January 1, 1990 (age 36); East St. Louis, Illinois, U.S.
- Listed height: 6 ft 0 in (1.83 m)
- Listed weight: 195 lb (88 kg)

Career information
- High school: East St. Louis (IL)
- College: Illinois
- NFL draft: 2013: 5th round, 150th overall pick

Career history

Playing
- Pittsburgh Steelers (2013)*; Winnipeg Blue Bombers (2014)*
- * Offseason or practice squad member only

Coaching
- East St. Louis HS (IL) (2014–2020) Assistant coach; Illinois (2021) Director of high school personnel & alumni relations; Arkansas (2022) Defensive quality control coach; Southern Illinois (2022–present) Cornerbacks coach

Awards and highlights
- TSN Freshman All-Big Ten (2009)
- Stats at Pro Football Reference

Terry Hawthorne (born January 1, 1990) is an American former professional football cornerback and current cornerbacks coach for Southern Illinois University. Hawthorne was selected by the Pittsburgh Steelers in the fifth round of the 2013 NFL draft. He played college football at Illinois. Hawthorne was a 2008 USA Today High School All-American selection as a wide receiver.

== Early life ==
Hawthorne attended East St. Louis High School, Class of 2009 where he played receiver, defensive back, punter and punt returner, and has been a starter since his sophomore year. On offense, he scored 28 touchdowns and recorded 1,009 receiving yards as a senior, while defensively, he recorded 118 tackles and eight interceptions, three returned for touchdowns. Regarded as four-star recruit by Rivals.com, Hawthorne was listed as the No. 6 wide receiver prospect of the class of 2009. Hawthorne is now the cornerbacks coach for Southern Illinois University.

He was a 2008 USA Today High School All-American selection as a wide receiver.

== Professional career ==
=== Pittsburgh Steelers ===
Hawthorne was selected by the Pittsburgh Steelers with the 150th overall pick in the fifth round of the 2013 NFL draft. Hawthorne was released by the Steelers on August 31, 2013.

=== Winnipeg Blue Bombers ===
Hawthorne signed with the Winnipeg Blue Bombers on June 1, 2014. On June 4, 2014, it was reported that he had left the Blue Bombers to return to school.
