= The Troubled Crusade =

1983 book by Diane Ravitch

- Author: Diane Ravitch
- Subject: History of education in the United States
- Publisher: Basic Books
- Publication date: 1983
- Pages: 384

The Troubled Crusade: American Education, 1945–1980 is a 1983 history book by Diane Ravitch that describes the postwar progressive education movement and American school reform of the mid-20th century.
