= Diane Ravitch =

American historian and educational policy analyst

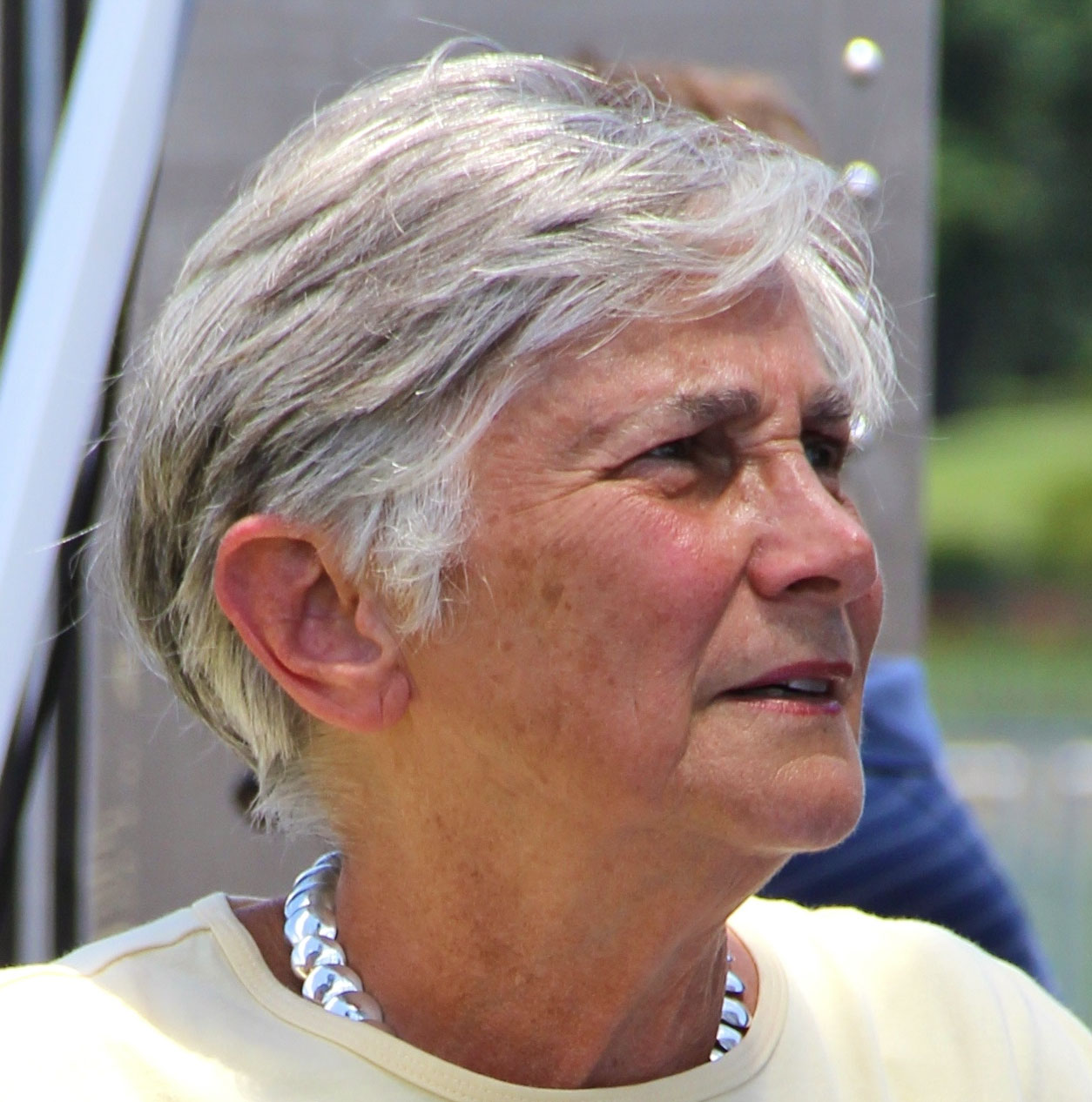
- Ravitch in 2011
- Born: Diane Silvers; July 1, 1938 (age 88); Houston, Texas, U.S.
- Education: Wellesley College; Columbia University
- Political party: Democratic
- Spouse: Richard Ravitch (m. 1960; div. 1986)
- Partner: Mary Butz (1988 - present)
- Website: Official website

Diane Silvers Ravitch (born July 1, 1938) is an American historian of education, an educational policy analyst, and a research professor at New York University's Steinhardt School of Culture, Education, and Human Development. Previously, she was a U.S. Assistant Secretary of Education. In 2010, she became "an activist on behalf of public schools." Her blog at DianeRavitch.net has received more than 36 million page views since she began blogging in 2012. Ravitch writes for the New York Review of Books.

== Early life and education ==
Ravitch was born into a Jewish family in 1938 in Houston, Texas, where she went to public schools from kindergarten through high school graduation from San Jacinto High School. She is one of eight children. She is a graduate of Wellesley College and earned a PhD from Columbia University.

== Career ==
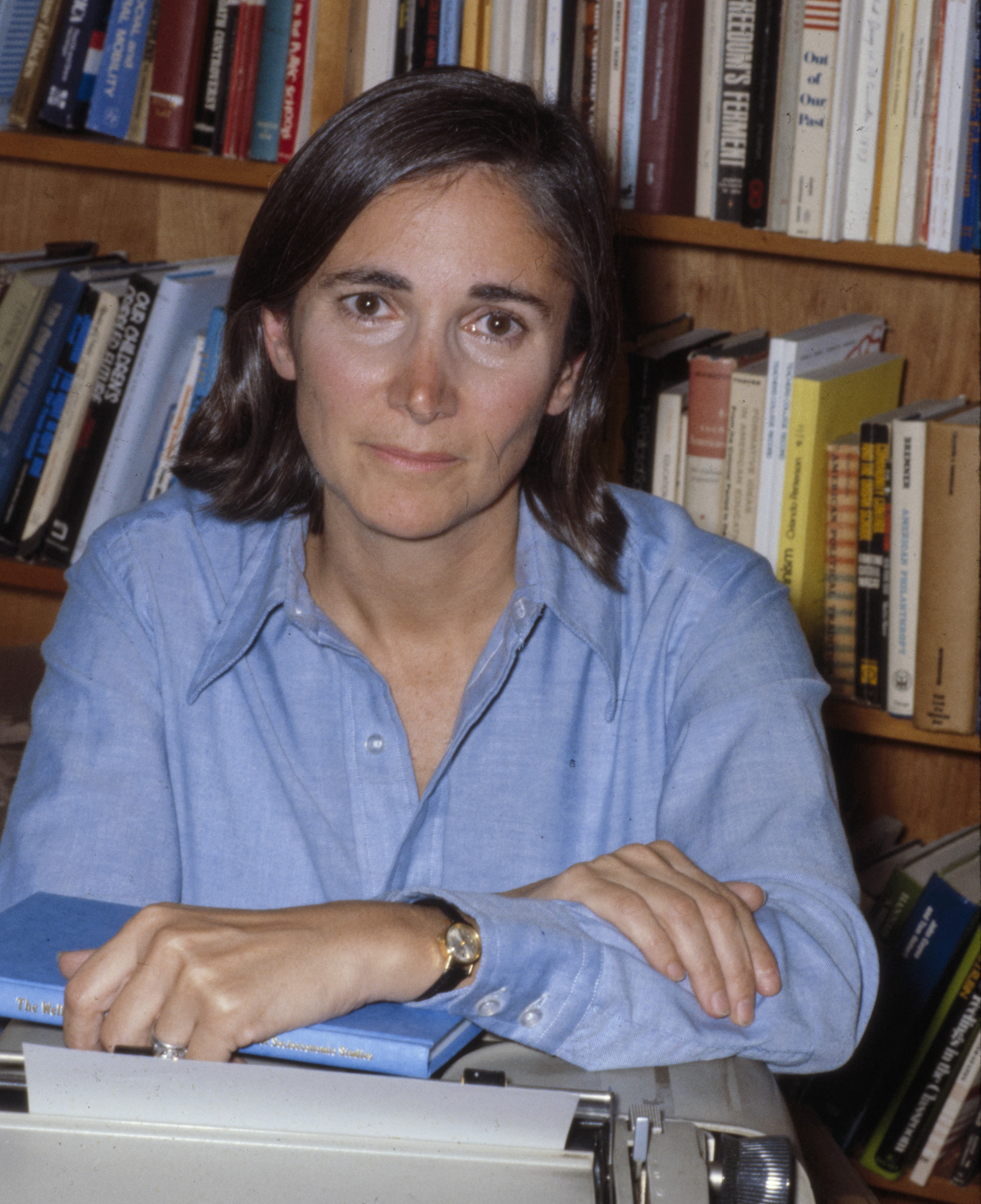
Ravitch c. 1980

Ravitch began her career as an editorial assistant at the liberal New Leader magazine. In 1975, she became a historian of education with a PhD from Columbia University. At that time she worked closely with Teachers College president Lawrence A. Cremin, who was her mentor.

Ravitch was appointed to public office by Presidents George H. W. Bush and Bill Clinton. She served as Assistant Secretary of Education under Secretary of Education Lamar Alexander from 1991 to 1993 and his successor Richard Riley appointed her to serve as a member of the National Assessment Governing Board, which supervises the National Assessment of Educational Progress; she was a member of NAGB from 1997 to 2004. From 1995 to 2005 she held the Brown Chair in Education Studies at the Brookings Institution.

From 1995 to 2020, Ravitch was Research Professor of Education at New York University's Steinhardt School of Culture, Human Development, and Education. She taught at Teachers College, Columbia University, from 1976 to 1991.

Ravitch participated in a "blog debate" called "Bridging Differences" with Steinhardt School colleague Deborah Meier on the website of Education Week from February 26, 2007, until September 2012.

In April 2012, Ravitch launched an education policy blog called "Diane Ravitch's blog" which is billed as "A site to discuss education and democracy". With Ravitch posting up to ten times daily, the blog is one of the leading education forums in the world, having received more than 36 million page views. She supports the importance of professional teachers and democratic public schools, and she criticizes high-stakes standardized tests and privatization of public schools by privately managed charters and vouchers for private schools.

In 2013, Ravitch worked with writer and former teacher, Anthony Cody, to create the Network for Public Education (NPE), which is a foundation dedicated to fighting against educational corporate reforms. In 2018, when President Trump appointed Betsy DeVos as Secretary of Education, membership in NPE increased from 22,000 to 330,000.

== Educational views ==
Ravitch's first book The Great School Wars (1974) is a history of New York City public schools. It described alternating eras of centralization and decentralization. It also tied periodic controversies over public education to periodic waves of immigration.

Her book The Language Police (2003) was a criticism of both left-wing and right-wing attempts to stifle the study and expression of views deemed unworthy by those groups. The Amazon.com review summarizes Ravitch's thesis as "pressure groups from the political right and left have wrested control of the language and content of textbooks and standardized exams, often at the expense of the truth (in the case of history), of literary quality (in the case of literature), and of education in general." Publishers Weekly wrote: "Ravitch contends that these sanitized materials sacrifice literary quality and historical accuracy in order to escape controversy."

Ravitch's writings on racial and cultural diversity were summarized by sociologist Vincent N. Parrillo:

[Ravitch] emphasized a common culture but one that incorporated the contributions of all racial and ethnic groups so that they can believe in their full membership in America’s past, present, and future. She envisioned elimination of allegiance to any specific racial and/or ethnic group, with emphasis instead on our common humanity, our shared national identity, and our individual accomplishments.

=== Reading instruction ===
Ravitch said that she supported the teaching of phonics when appropriate.

In the early 2000s, she was critical of the then New York mayor Michael Bloomberg who, after taking control over New York public schools, replaced phonics with balanced literacy helped by Joel Klein, the then chancellor of the New York City Department of Education. Klein credited balanced literacy with raising the city's fourth-grade reading scores. Ravitch rebutted that claim by noting that the rise in reading scores occurred in 2002—before Klein became chancellor and implemented balanced literacy.

In 2014, she blogged about a battle "between literacy guru Lucy Calkins of Teachers College and Common Core architect David Coleman about teaching reading". Calkins supported Balanced Literacy, Coleman supported close reading. Some commentators took it as Ravitch endorsing Calkins, while others detected cognitive dissonance in her reporting:

[Ravitch] obviously wants to continue bashing Coleman, whom she despises; but she (admirably) can’t bring herself to endorse Calkins’ approach, which is contrary to everything Ravitch has ever said about the importance of a rich curriculum with lots of content knowledge.

Ravitch clarified her position as neutral, saying that she had stopped taking sides between Balanced Literacy and Core Knowledge, "Each has strong points and weak points. Everything depends on how they are taught."

In 2020, Ravitch reported about Calkins' attempts to "rebalance balanced literacy to incorporate more early phonics", but did not take sides. "Different strategies for different children. The teacher should know them all and use whatever is suited to the child", commented Ravitch.

Ravitch repeatedly said that she could not bring herself to believe in "the science of reading." According to her, "there is no 'science of mathematics,' no 'science of science,' no 'science of history'."

In 2025, Ravitch hailed the dismissal of a lawsuit filed by a group of parents against the authors of two popular reading programs: Lucy Calkins, and Irene Fountas and Gay Su Pinnell. The parents argued that the curricula authors violated consumer protection law by making false claims about the research supporting their programs. The court could not grant a decision in the case, because it would require passing judgement on the quality of the reading programs—a task that the court said it is not equipped to perform. "So glad the lawsuit got tossed. Indeed it was frivolous", wrote Ravitch.

In 2026, Ravitch opposed the proposed Science of Reading Act, which intended to amend the Elementary and Secondary Education Act of 1965 (20 U.S.C. 6641(b)) by prohibiting usage of a three-cueing model and by requiring application of "science of reading", in particular "instruction in phonemic awareness, phonics, vocabulary, fluency, comprehension, and writing as essential components to skilled reading".

As I have said repeatedly, I do not believe that any legislature should mandate teaching methods. They get swept along by fads, they are not experts, they have no business telling teachers how to teach. Legislating “how to teach” makes as little sense as legislating how to perform open heart surgery.

=== School choice and testing ===
Initially a proponent of No Child Left Behind, by 2010 Ravitch renounced her earlier support for high-stakes testing and school choice. She critiqued the punitive uses of accountability to fire teachers and close schools, as well as replacing public schools with charter schools and relying on superstar teachers. She wrote, "I no longer believe that either approach will produce the quantum improvement in American education that we all hope for." On her blog, she often cited low-performing charters, frauds, corruption, incompetent charter operators, exclusionary policies practiced by charters, and other poor results that diverted funding from public schools into private hands. High-stakes testing, "utopian" goals, "draconian" penalties, school closings, privatization, and charter schools didn't work, she concluded. "The best predictor of low academic performance is poverty—not bad teachers."

Ravitch said that the charter school and testing reform movement was started by billionaires and "right wing think tanks like The Heritage Foundation" for the purpose of destroying public education and teachers' unions. She reviewed the documentary Waiting for Superman, directed by Davis Guggenheim, as "propagandistic" (pro-charter schools and anti-public schools), studded with "myths" and at least one "flatly wrong" claim. Of Education Secretary Arne Duncan's Race to the Top program, Ravitch said in a 2011 interview it "is an extension of No Child Left Behind ...[,] all bad ideas." She concluded "We are destroying our education system, blowing it up by these stupid policies. And handing the schools in low-income neighborhoods over to private entrepreneurs does not, in itself, improve them. There's plenty of evidence by now that the kids in those schools do no better, and it's simply a way of avoiding their - the public responsibility to provide good education."

Repudiating the policies she had formerly espoused, Ravitch wrote The Death and Life of the Great American School System: How Testing and Choice Undermine Education (2010), which became a surprise best seller. One reviewer noted that "Ravitch exhibits an interesting mix of support for public education and the rights of teachers to bargain collectively with a tough-mindedness that some on the pedagogical left lack."

Her next book Reign of Error: The Hoax of the Privatization Movement and Its Danger to America’s Public Schools was a national bestseller. She describes in detail the policies that are needed to improve the lives of children and families, based on research, and beginning with prenatal care for all pregnant women. Data show that the U.S. lags other nations in providing prenatal care and high-quality preschool, but leads other advanced nations in rates of child poverty and inequality of wealth and income.

=== National standards and Common Core ===
During the 1980s, Ravitch began calling for voluntary national standards in education. She became associated with Core Knowledge movement, championed by E. D. Hirsch. During her stint as an assistant secretary of education, she was tasked to develop national standards, even though the federal government did not have the authority to make the states adopt them. By 2007, Ravitch no longer accepted the free-market components of education reform. She continued to work with Hirsch calling for more attention to curriculum and instruction. In 2008 she became a co-chair of the board of the newly created Common Core, Inc. Funded by the Gates Foundation, the Common Core issued a press release saying that the curriculum maps were "comprehensive, coherent sequence of thematic curriculum units connecting the skills outlined in the CCSS with suggested student objectives, texts, activities, and much more."

In her book The Death and Life of the Great American School System: How Testing and Choice Undermine Education, published in 2010, Ravitch proclaimed:

Every school should have a well-conceived, coherent curriculum. A curriculum is not a script, but a set of general guidelines. Students should regularly engage in the study and practice of the liberal arts and sciences: history, literature, geography, the sciences, civics, mathematics, the arts, and foreign languages, as well as health and physical education.

She continued:

Nations such as Japan and Finland have developed excellent curricula that spell out what students are supposed to learn in a wide variety of subjects. If we are willing to learn from top-performing nations, we should establish a substantive national curriculum that declares our intention to educate all children in the full range of liberal arts and sciences, as well as physical education. The curriculum would designate the essential knowledge and skills that students need to learn.

In September 2010, Ravitch left Common Core, Inc., becoming disillusioned by the Gates’-funded Common Core. The 3rd edition of the book, published in 2016, changed the tone accordingly:

In the original edition of this book, I expressed my view that the nation needs national standards. I thought that the culture wars of the 1990s are behind us. I believed that common sense would prevail and that professionals in every field could agree on the knowledge and skills that all citizens needed. I did not make any recommendations about national tests.

The fundamental error of the Common Core standards is that they were written by a small group of people without the involvement of classroom teachers and scholars in the respective fields. They were written with remarkable speed but without any public review process. There were no means by which to revise them after they were published. States could add up to 15 percent additional content, but could subtract or change nothing. It was a missed opportunity to do it right. The toxicity of the Common Core standards persuaded me that it is fruitless to rely on national curriculum standards as a solution to education problems.

Ravitch turned her attention to poverty and racial segregation as the main causes of low student achievement. Ravitch claims that the Common Core "was a rush job, and the final product ignored the needs of children with disabilities, English-language learners and those in the early grades." She says that the country needs "schools where all children have the same chance to learn. That doesn’t require national standards or national tests, which improve neither teaching nor learning, and do nothing to help poor children at racially segregated schools."

== Personal life ==
She married Richard Ravitch (who later served as Lieutenant Governor of New York) in 1960; they divorced in 1986. While her husband worked in the family business, she stayed home and raised three sons, the second of whom, Steven, died of leukemia aged two; his brothers went to private schools.

Ravitch lives in Southold, New York. Her longtime partner is Mary Butz, a retired New York City public school principal who also administered a progressive principal-training program. She and Butz were married on December 12, 2012.

In 2025, Ravitch published a memoir titled An Education: How I Changed My Mind About Schools and Almost Everything Else which explores the evolution of her views on education and social issues.

== Bibliography ==
External videos
- Panel discussion of Left Back with Bill Bennett, Ronald Nessen, Diane Ravitch, and Donna Shalala, September 11, 2000, C-SPAN
- Booknotes interview with Ravitch about Left Back, October 8, 2000, C-SPAN
- Presentation by Ravitch on The Language Police, May 6, 2003, C-SPAN
- After Words interview with Ravitch on The Death and Life of the Great American School System, March 10, 2010, C-SPAN

- The Great School Wars: New York City, 1805-1973 (1974, reissued 1988, 2000) ISBN 0-8018-6471-2
- The Revisionists Revised: A Critique of the Radical Attack on the Schools (1978) ISBN 0-465-06943-6
- Schools in Cities: Consensus and Conflict in American Educational History (1983) ISBN 0-8419-0850-8
- Against Mediocrity: The Humanities in America's High Schools (1984) ISBN 0-8419-0944-X
- Challenges to the Humanities (1985) ISBN 0-8419-1017-0
- The Schools We Deserve (1985) ISBN 0-465-07236-4
- The Troubled Crusade: American Education, 1945–1980 (1983) ISBN 0-465-08757-4
- What Do Our 17-Year-Olds Know: A Report on the First National Assessment of History and Literature (1989) ISBN 0-06-015849-2
- The American Reader : Words That Moved a Nation (1990) ISBN 0-06-016480-8
- National Standards in American Education: A Consumer's Guide (1995) ISBN 0-8157-7352-8
- New Schools for a New Century: The Redesign of Urban Education (1997) ISBN 0-300-07874-9
- City Schools: Lessons from New York (2000) ISBN 0-8018-6341-4
- Left Back: A Century of Battles Over School Reform (2000) ISBN 0-684-84417-6
- Kid Stuff: Marketing Sex and Violence to America's Children (2003) ISBN 0-8018-7327-4
- Making Good Citizens: Education and Civil Society (2003) ISBN 0-300-09917-7
- The Language Police: How Pressure Groups Restrict What Students Learn (2003) ISBN 0-375-41482-7
- Forgotten Heroes of American Education: The Great Tradition of Teaching Teachers (2006) ISBN 1-59311-448-6
- The English Reader: What Every Literate Person Needs to Know (2006) ISBN 0-19-507729-6
- EdSpeak: A Glossary of Education Terms, Phrases, Buzzwords, and Jargon (2007) ISBN 978-1-4166-0575-1
- The Death and Life of the Great American School System: How Testing and Choice Are Undermining Education (2010) ISBN 978-0-465-01491-0
- Reign of Error: The Hoax of the Privatization Movement and the Danger to America's Public Schools (2013) ISBN 978-0385350884
- Slaying Goliath: The Passionate Resistance to Privatization and the Fight to Save America's Schools (2020) ISBN 978-0525655374
- An Education: How I Changed My Mind About Schools and Almost Everything Else (2025) ISBN 978-0231563161

== Awards ==
- Delta Kappa Gamma Educators' Award
- Ambassador of Honor Award, English-Speaking Union
- Phi Beta Kappa visiting scholar, 1984–85
- Henry Allen Moe Prize, American Philosophical Society, 1986
- designated honorary citizen, State of California Senate Rules Committee, 1988, for work on state curriculum
- Alumnae Achievement Award, Wellesley College, 1989
- Medal of Distinction, Polish National Council of Education, 1991
- Literary Lion, New York Public Library, 1992
- Award for Distinguished Service, New York Academy of Public Education, 1994
- Horace Kidger Award, New England History Teachers Association, 1998
- Award of Excellence, St. John's University School of Education, 1998
- John Dewey Education Award, United Federation of Teachers, 2005
- Guggenheim fellowship, 1977
- Honorary Life Trustee, New York Public Library
- John Dewey Award, United Federation of Teachers, New York City, 2005
- Gaudium Award from the Breukelein Institute, 2005
- Uncommon Book Award, Hoover Institution, 2005
- NEA Friend of Education, 2010
- American Association of School Administrators, American Education Award, 2011
- Outstanding Friend of Education Award, Horace Mann League, 2011
- Distinguished Service Award, National Association of Secondary School Principals, 2011
- The Deborah W. Meier Hero in Education Award from FairTest, 2011
- Daniel Patrick Moynihan Prize Winner from the American Academy of Political and Social Science, 2011
- Politico 50, one of the 50 people whose ideas are shaping our society, 2014
- Grawemeyer Award in Education for Death and Life of the Great American School System, 2014

=== Honorary degrees ===
- Amherst College
- Middlebury College Language Schools
- Ramapo College
- Reed College
- Saint Joseph's College (New York)
- Siena College
- State University of New York
- Union College
- Williams College

== See also ==
- The Inconvenient Truth Behind Waiting for Superman

== Further reading and reviews ==
- Apple, Michael W. "What Do Our 17- Year Olds Know? A Report on the First National Assessment of History and Literature" Teachers College Record (Fall 1988) 90#1 pp. 123–127.
- Brinkley, Alan. "All Things to All People: Fifty Years of American Schools" Harvard Educational Review (1984) 54#4 pp. 452–459. Reviews The Troubled Crusade: American Education, 1945-1980
- Cohen, Sol. "Traditions of American Education." Historical Studies in Education/Revue d'histoire de l'éducation (2000): 169–181. online; reviews Left Back: A Century of Failed School Reforms (2000)
- Evans, Ronald W. "Diane Ravitch and the revival of history: A critique." Social Studies 80.3 (1989): 85–88.
- Jeynes, William H. "Immigration in the United States and the golden years of education: Was Ravitch right?." Educational Studies 35.3 (2004). online
- Laukaitis, John. "Ravitch reversed: Ideology and the history of American education reform." American Educational History Journal 44.1/2 (2017): 21–31. online
- Machtinger, Howard. "The Death and Life of American School Reform." Labor: Studies in Working-Class History of the Americas 8.4 (2011): 115–132. online
- Warren, Donald. "Education Reform in the Age of Policy." Teachers College Record (1984) 85#4 pp. 684–687. Reviews The Troubled Crusade: American Education, 1945-1980
- Zilversmit, Arthur. "Reform and Reaction in Education." Reviews in American History (1984) 12#2 pp. 274–277 online
