= The Death and Life of the Great American School System =

Non-fiction book by Diane Ravitch

- Author: Diane Ravitch
- Subject: Education reform
- Publisher: Basic Books
- Publication date: March 2, 2010
- Publication place: New York
- Pages: 283
- ISBN: 9780465014910
- OCLC: 716862891
- Preceded by: EdSpeak: A Glossary of Education Terms, Phrases, Buzzwords, and Jargon
- Followed by: Reign of Error: The Hoax of the Privatization Movement and the Danger to America's Public Schools

The Death and Life of the Great American School System: How Testing and Choice Are Undermining Education is a non-fiction book by Diane Ravitch, originally published in 2010 by Basic Books, with revised and expanded versions reprinted over the years.

== Summary ==
Ravitch is a "distinguished historian of public schools" who served under both President George H. W. Bush and Bill Clinton, worked for many years promoting and implementing the 2002 No Child Left Behind Act's (NCLB) compulsory standards-based education reform. After reading a major 2006 report, Ravitch began to experience an "intellectual crisis" and had become skeptical of the "potential benefits of testing, accountability, choice, and markets." The book is a "passionate plea to preserve and renew public education."

By 2007, school choice, standardized testing and accountability were promoted by the "educational establishment." Ravitch writes that these policies were "degrading the intellectual capacity of students."

The 2010 Publisher's summary on WorldCat called her book a "passionate plea to preserve and renew public education."

== Background ==
The title refers to Jane Jacobs's best-known and most influential work, her 1961 nonfiction, The Death and Life of Great American Cities, in which she lay the blame for the urban decay of America's cities on misguided 20th century urban planning policies.

== Reviews ==
In his March 2010, review in The New York Times, Alan Wolfe, wrote that he admired Ravitch's "intellectual honesty" and "open-mindedness in seeing what the data really tells us." However, he doubted it would be enough to counterbalance the fact that President Obama and his secretary of education, Arne Duncan, were promoting "reforms relying on testing and choice, despite fresh data calling their benefits into question." The New York Times review called it the "most damning criticism" of the role some "philanthropic institutions sometimes play" in American society. Ravitz cautioned that the Gates Foundation gives "grants to almost every major think tank and advocacy group in the field of education, leaving no one willing to criticize its vast power and unchecked influence."

A 2010 NPR review called the book "terrific and timely".

Chester Finn Jr, who co-founded the Educational Excellence Network (EEI) in 1981 with Ravitch, reviewed the book, and wrote that "I agree about the curriculum part but not much else."

The Washington Post's Valerie Strauss, wrote that Ravitch's "credibility with conservatives is exactly why it would be particularly instructive for everyone...to read The Death and Life of the Great American School System..
