= The Revisionists Revised =

1978 book by Diane Ravitch

- Author: Diane Ravitch
- Subject: Historiography of education
- Publisher: Basic Books
- Publication date: 1978
- Pages: 194

The Revisionists Revised is a 1978 history book by Diane Ravitch in criticism of recent "revisionist" works in the history of education that view public schooling as a conspiracy against the working class and human spontaneity. She argues that the goals of public schooling have varied throughout American history and across the country, and though there is disagreement over its intents, that working class people have depended on the school for the futures of their children.
