= Harry Kozol =

American neurologist

Harry Kozol (August 2, 1906 – August 27, 2008) was an American neurologist who helped establish the fields of forensic psychiatry and neuropsychiatry. Kozol treated or analyzed several well-known figures, including playwright Eugene O'Neill, the Boston Strangler, and heiress Patty Hearst.

He married Ruth (Massell) Kozol and was the father of Jonathan Kozol. In later years, Kozol suffered from Alzheimer's disease, and his son wrote a book about the family's experience, The Theft of Memory.

He graduated from Harvard College and Harvard Medical School.
