= Deborah Meier =

American educator (born 1931)

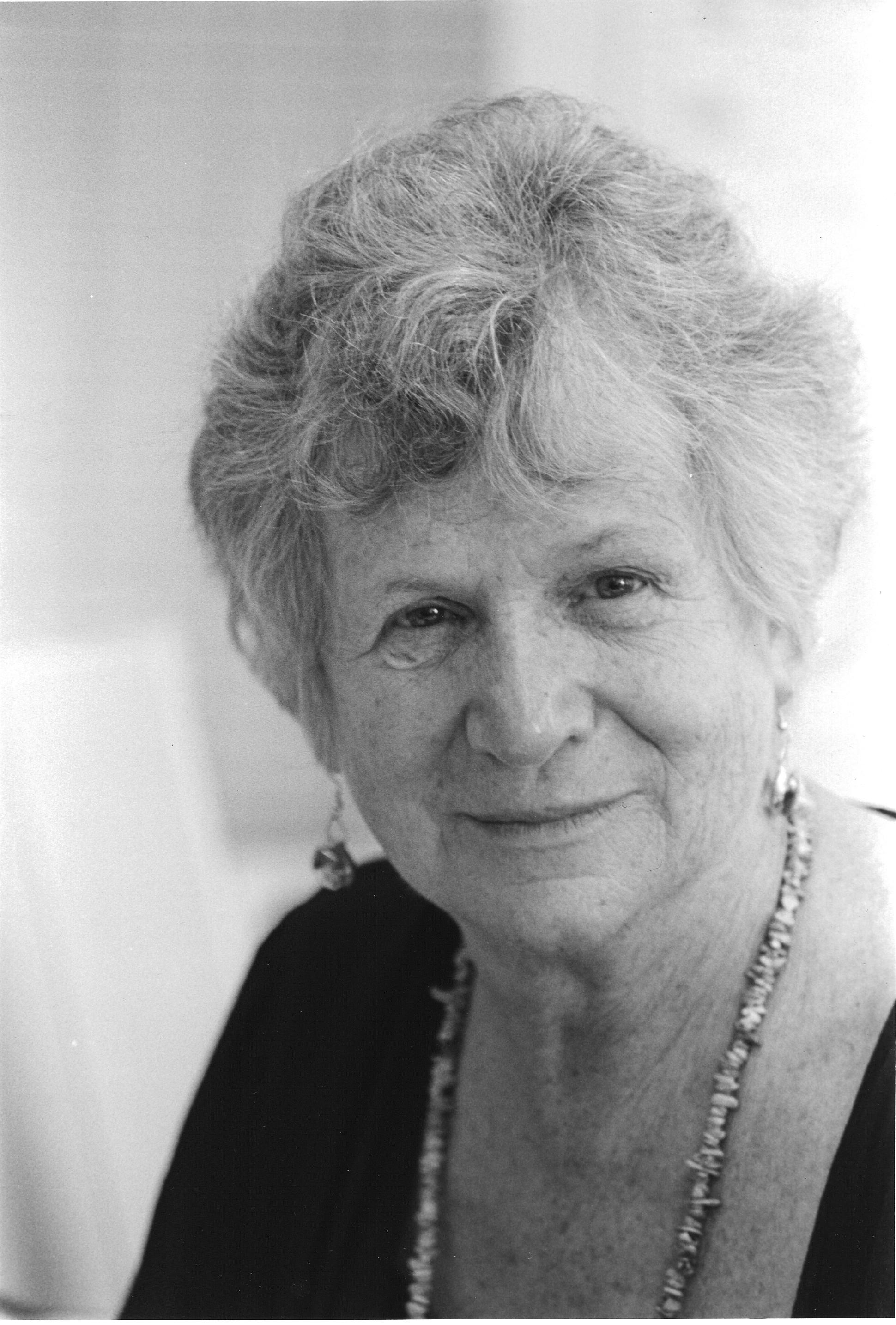
Meier

Deborah Meier (born April 6, 1931) is an American educator who is known for promoting the modern small schools movement. After spending several years as a kindergarten teacher in Chicago, Philadelphia and then New York City, in 1974, Meier became the founder and director of the alternative Central Park East school, which embraced progressive ideals in the tradition of John Dewey in an effort to provide better education for children in East Harlem, within the New York City public school system.

Meier then worked to open two other small public elementary schools, Central Park East II (where she also served as principal) and River East, both in East Harlem. In 1984, with the assistance and support of Ted Sizer's Coalition of Essential Schools, Meier founded the Central Park East Secondary School. The success of these schools has been documented in David Bensman's Central Park East and its Graduates: Learning by Heart (2000), and in Frederick Wiseman's documentary film, "High School II" (1994), among many other publications. During this time, and after, Meier helped to establish a network of small schools in New York City based on progressive principles. In 1996 Meier moved to Boston where she became the founding principal of a small K-8 pilot school, Mission Hill School, within the Boston Public Schools system. She has been on the faculty of New York University's Steinhardt School of Education, as senior scholar and adjunct professor, as well as board member and Director of New Ventures at Mission Hill, director and advisor to Forum for Democracy and Education, and on the Executive Board of The Coalition of Essential Schools.

Meier wrote about Central Park East Secondary School in The Power of their Ideas: Lessons for America from a Small School in Harlem (1995). Her other books include, Will Standards Save Public Education? (2000); In Schools We Trust: Creating Communities of Learning in an Era of Testing and Standardization (2002); co-authored with Ted and Nancy Sizer, Keeping School: Letters to Families from Principals of Two Small Schools (2004); co-edited with George Wood, Many Children Left Behind (2004), and co-authored with Emily Gasoi, These Schools Belong to You and Me: Why We Can't Afford to Abandon our Public Schools (2017); all published by Beacon Press. With Teachers College Press she co-authored with Beth Taylor and Brenda Engel, Playing for Keeps: Life and Learning on a Public School Playground (2010); co-edited with Matthew Knoester and Katherine Clunis D'Andrea, Teaching in Themes: An Approach to Schoolwide Learning, Creating Community, and Differentiated Instruction (2015); and co-authored with Matthew Knoester, Beyond Testing: 7 Assessments of Students and Schools More Effective than Standardized Tests (2017).

Among the many boards on which she has served was the founding board of the National Board for Professional Teaching Standards and she is an elected member of the National Academy of Education. In 1987 Meier received a MacArthur Fellowship, the first teacher or principal so honored. She serves on the editorial boards of The Nation, Educational Policy, Harvard Education Letter, and Dissent magazine, to which she has contributed many articles, including her essay in the 50th anniversary issue of Dissent, "On Unions and Education", in which she emphasizes the importance of union collaboration to her success in leading public schools in New York and Boston. Meier regularly speaks and writes on the connections between small schools, democratic education, education for democracy, progressive education, and public schooling.

Meier received her master's degree from the University of Chicago. She has received honorary degrees from a large number of universities, including Bank Street College of Education, Brown University, Clark University, Dartmouth College, Harvard University, Lesley University, Teachers College, Yale University, and York University.

She participated in a "blog debate" with Steinhardt School colleague Diane Ravitch, among others, on the website of Education Week from 2007-2017.

In 2009, the National Center for Fair and Open Testing, or FairTest, named an annual award after Meier, entitled the "Deborah W. Meier Hero in Education Award." Recipients include Diane Ravitch, Jonathan Kozol, Michelle Fine, Karen Lewis (labor leader), Leon Botstein, Nancy Carlsson-Paige, Lani Guinier, John H. Jackson, and Barbara Madeloni.
