= Montez Murphy =

American gridiron football player (born 1982)

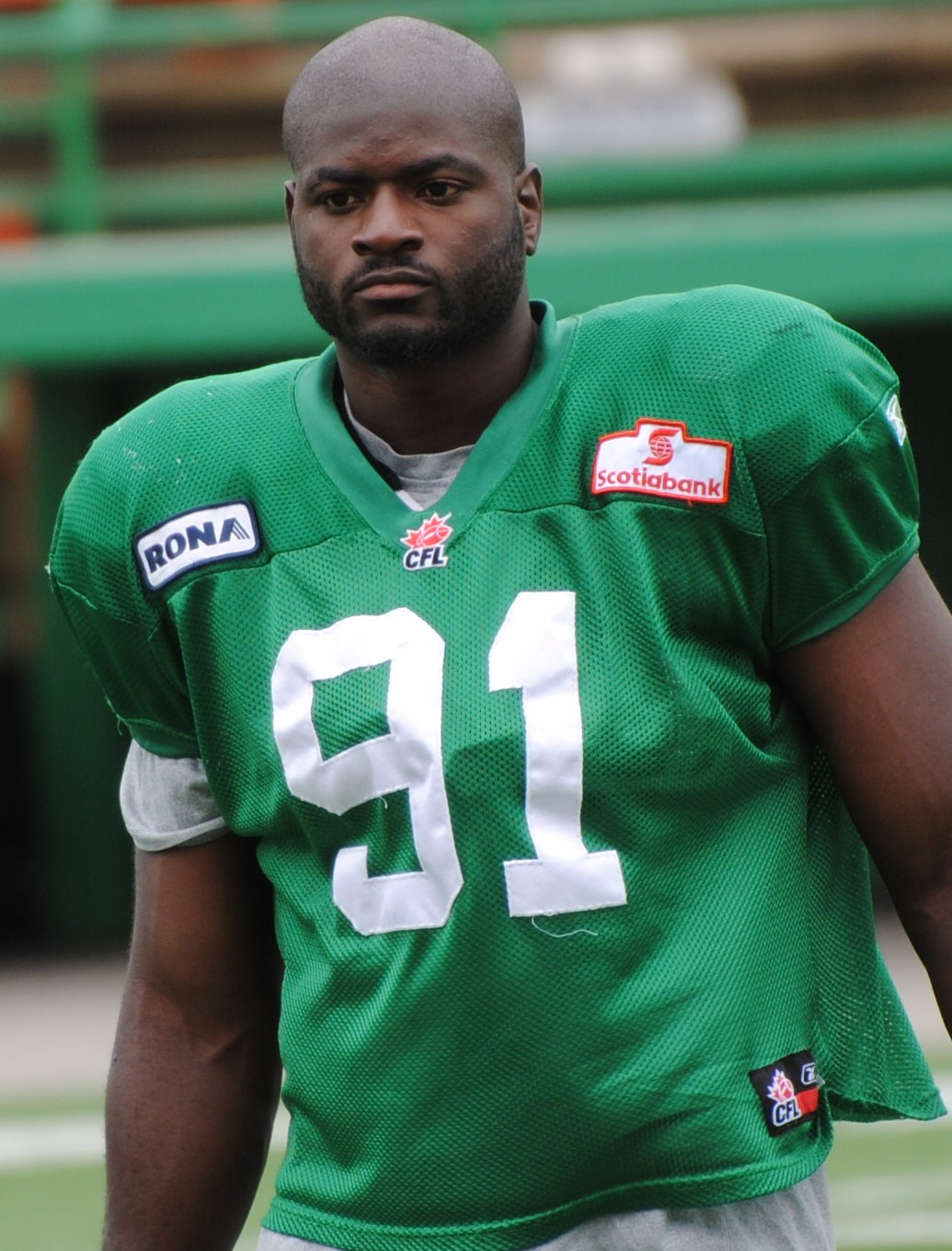

No. 72
- Position: Defensive tackle

Personal information
- Born: January 6, 1982 (age 44); Meridian, Mississippi, U.S.
- Listed height: 6 ft 6 in (1.98 m)
- Listed weight: 256 lb (116 kg)

Career information
- High school: East St. Louis
- College: Baylor
- NFL draft: 2006: undrafted

Career history
- Green Bay Packers (2006)*; Kansas City Chiefs (2006); Edmonton Eskimos (2008); Winnipeg Blue Bombers (2009)*; Hamilton Tiger-Cats (2009); Saskatchewan Roughriders (2010–2011)
- * Offseason or practice squad member only

Career CFL statistics
- Tackles: 51
- Sacks: 8
- Stats at CFL.ca (archived)
- Stats at Pro Football Reference

Montez Murphy (born January 6, 1982) is a former gridiron football defensive tackle. He was signed by the Kansas City Chiefs as an undrafted free agent in 2006. He played college football for the Baylor Bears.

Murphy was also a member of the Green Bay Packers, Edmonton Eskimos, Winnipeg Blue Bombers, Hamilton Tiger-Cats and Saskatchewan Roughriders.
