= Savage Inequalities =

Book by Jonathan Kozol

- Author: Jonathan Kozol
- Language: English and Spanish
- Subject: Education
- Genre: Sociological
- Publisher: Harper Perennial
- Publication date: 1991
- Publication place: United States of America
- Pages: 255
- ISBN: 0-06-097499-0
- OCLC: 25631711
- Dewey Decimal: 371.96/7 20
- LC Class: LC409 .K69 1992

Savage Inequalities: Children in America's Schools is a book written by Jonathan Kozol in 1991 that discusses the disparities in education between schools of different classes and races. It is based on his observations of various classrooms in the public school systems of East St. Louis, Chicago, New York City, Camden, Cincinnati, and Washington D.C. His observations take place in both schools with the lowest per capita spending on students and the highest, ranging from just over $3,000 in Camden, New Jersey to a maximum expenditure of up to $15,000 in Great Neck, Long Island.

In his visits to these areas, Kozol illustrates the overcrowded, unsanitary and often understaffed environment that is lacking in basic tools and textbooks for teaching. He cites the large proportions of minorities in the areas with the lowest annual budgets, despite the higher taxation rate on individuals living in poverty within the school district.

Kozol cites various historical cases regarding lawsuits filed against school districts in East Orange, Camden, Irvington and Jersey City in which judges have sided with the children and concerned locals in a given district instead of adhering to state law concerning the taxation and distribution of funding. He additionally goes into detail comparing the current conditions poor, minority children are expected to learn in, and the findings of the historical case Brown v. Board of Education, and Plessy v. Ferguson.

He also mentions other such historical cases in which the outcomes have supported what he views to be an unjust system of funds distribution and taxation in Milliken v. Bradley, San Antonio Independent School District v. Rodriguez, and through the overturning of State Supreme Court decisions in both Michigan and Texas by the Supreme Court of the United States.

Kozol argues that racial segregation is still alive and well in the American educational system, due to the gross inequalities that result from unequal distribution of funds collected through both property taxes and funds distributed by the State in an attempt to "equalize" the expenditures of schools.

== Awards ==
Savage Inequalities was a finalist for the 1992 National Book Critics Circle Award and received the New England Book Award for non-fiction.

== See also ==
- The Shame of the Nation
