= Rose Marion Boylan =

Rose Marion Boylan, (ca. 1875–1947) known professionally as Rose Marion, was a newspaper reporter for more than forty-six years in the St. Louis, Missouri, area.

== Early life and education ==
Born around 1875 in Pittsburg Hill, Illinois, she was the daughter of Michael Marion of Ireland and Marie Helene Brugiere. She was the only graduate of East St. Louis High School in 1890 and then took teacher-training courses at the University of Illinois, Washington University in St. Louis, Bloomington Normal School and Chicago Normal School.

== Career ==
She taught in high school and wrote occasionally for local newspapers until 1901, when she was hired by the St. Louis Post-Dispatch.

She was active in women's groups and in Republican politics, being an alternate delegate to the 1920 Republican National Convention in Chicago.

She covered the Louisiana Purchase Exposition of 1904, where "she had the advantage of speaking French, and she interviewed the envoys of foreign countries which sent exhibits and had buildings in Forest Park."

In 1905, Marion was called a "famous feature writer" after she returned from attending a convention of the Federated Women's Clubs in Paris, Missouri, where she wrote a guest column for the local newspaper, the Paris Mercury. Among other topics she gave her opinion of President Grover Cleveland:

I detest one Grover Cleveland, and, like the rest of my sex, recoil from the coarseness and the implied brutality of his views. Women are individual human creatures and as such, like men, are entitled to all that life holds for them of beauty, goodness, knowledge and pleasurable experience.

She continued work for the Post-Dispatch on a part-time basis until 1913, when she went to the Globe-Democrat. She was working for the newspaper in the East St. Louis City Hall press room, where she was stricken and taken to a hospital.

During the later part of her life she also collected news for radio station WTMV and wrote a column for the East St. Louis Journal.

She was honored as an outstanding citizen and pioneer businesswoman at an East St. Louis community dinner on October 16, 1939.

== Personal life ==
At the Louisiana Purchase Exposition of 1904 she met Robert J. Boylan, a reporter for the St. Louis Globe-Democrat (later city editor), and they married in 1906. He died in 1936.

A resident of East St. Louis, she had two children, Robert J. Boylan Jr., and Rose Josephine Boylan, and a sister, Josephine Marion.

She died on December 28, 1947, with the diagnosis of pneumonia. A funeral service was held at St. Elizabeth's Catholic Church.
