= Shelby Jordan =

American football player (1952–2022)

No. 63, 74, 64
- Position: Offensive tackle

Personal information
- Born: January 23, 1952; St. Louis, Missouri, U.S.
- Died: September 9, 2022 (aged 70)
- Listed height: 6 ft 7 in (2.01 m)
- Listed weight: 260 lb (118 kg)

Career information
- High school: East St. Louis Senior (East St. Louis, Illinois)
- College: Washington University in St. Louis
- NFL draft: 1973: 7th round, 157th overall pick

Career history
- New England Patriots (1975–1982); Los Angeles Raiders (1983–1986)

Awards and highlights
- Super Bowl champion (XVIII)
- Stats at Pro Football Reference
- College Football Hall of Fame

Shelby Lewis Jordan (January 23, 1952 – September 9, 2022) was an American professional football player who was an offensive tackle in the National Football League (NFL) for the New England Patriots and the Los Angeles Raiders from 1975 to 1986. He was a member of the 1983 Raiders team that won Super Bowl XVIII.

Jordan played college football at Washington University in St. Louis. In 2013, he was inducted into the College Football Hall of Fame.

== Early life ==
Jordan was born on January 23, 1952, in St. Louis, Missouri. He attended East St. Louis Senior High School in East St. Louis, Illinois.

== College career ==
As part of a career scholarship program, Jordan took night classes at Washington University in St. Louis. He was convinced by coaches to join the football team. He played football with the Washington University Bears as a linebacker from 1969 to 1972 and led the team in tackles for three consecutive seasons. In 1974, he graduated from the university with a degree in psychology.

He was inducted into the College Football Hall of Fame in 2013 and has been considered Washington University's greatest defensive player of all time.

== Professional career ==
The Houston Oilers selected Jordan in the seventh round, with the 157th overall selection, of the 1973 NFL draft. The Oilers cut Jordan during training camp. He went to work for Service Merchandise.

In 1974, Jordan signed with the New England Patriots after a try-out. He went on the injured reserve list before the season due to a knee injury, ruling him out for the 1974 season. Jordan debuted with the Patriots in 1975. In August 1975, Jordan was arrested for the possession and sale of cocaine. He was sentenced to two years in prison in May 1976. Jordan missed the 1976 season. He was released after serving over a year and was reinstated to the Patriots roster in July 1977.

Jordan played for the Patriots for seven seasons and started in 87 games. In 1983, he signed a four-year contract with the Los Angeles Raiders worth $1.6 million. The Raiders won Super Bowl XVIII later that season. During his four seasons with the Raiders, Jordan played in 56 games, five of which he started. The Raiders placed Jordan on the injured reserve list before the 1987 season, and he crossed the picket line during the 1987 NFL strike.

== Personal life ==
Together with his wife, Donzella, Jordan funded and directed a Los Angeles-based nonprofit corporation that provided affordable urban housing.

Jordan died on September 9, 2022.
