= Ed Blake =

American baseball player (1925–2009)

- Pitcher
- Born: December 23, 1925; St. Louis, Missouri, US
- Died: April 15, 2009 (aged 83); Swansea, Illinois, US
- Batted: Right Threw: Right

MLB debut
- May 1, 1951, for the Cincinnati Reds

Last MLB appearance
- April 28, 1957, for the Kansas City Athletics

MLB statistics
- Win–loss record: 0–0
- Earned run average: 8.31
- Strikeouts: 1
- Stats at Baseball Reference

Teams
- Cincinnati Reds (1951–1953); Kansas City Athletics (1957)

Edward James Blake (December 23, 1925 – April 15, 2009) was an American professional baseball pitcher. He played parts of four seasons in Major League Baseball (MLB) with the Cincinnati Reds and the Kansas City Athletics. In eight career games, Blake pitched 8 2/3 innings and recorded an 8.31 earned run average (ERA).

After graduating from high school in East St. Louis, Illinois, Blake signed with the St. Louis Cardinals and played in their minor league system before enlisting in the United States Army during World War II. He returned to baseball after being wounded in action, spending five years in the minors before making his MLB debut with the Cincinnati Reds in 1951. He appeared intermittently for the Reds over three seasons before joining the Toronto Maple Leafs of the International League, where he pitched for six years.

Blake returned to the majors in 1957 for a brief stint with the Kansas City Athletics. He retired from professional baseball in 1959. Following his playing career, he worked as a plumber. He died in 2009 in Swansea, Illinois, at the age of 83.

== Early life ==
Born in St. Louis, Missouri, Blake was the son of Edward and Katherine Blake. He attended Central Catholic High School in East St. Louis, Illinois, where he was a baseball teammate of Hank Bauer, and graduated in 1943.

After graduating, Blake pitched batting practice for the St. Louis Cardinals during the 1943 World Series, which he later described as the highlight of his professional career. He signed with the Cardinals in 1944 and spent that season with three different minor league teams: the Columbus Red Birds of the American Association, the Allentown Cardinals of the Interstate League, and the Mobile Bears of the Southern Association.

== Military service and 1940s career ==
After the 1944 season, Blake enlisted in the United States Army and served with the 40th Infantry Division in the Pacific Theater of Operations. While stationed in the Philippines, he was wounded and spent nine months recovering. Fully recovered by the start of the 1946 season, Blake rejoined the St. Louis Cardinals organization and pitched that year for the Columbus Cardinals. Although he lost his first three starts, he went on to win 13 consecutive games, finishing the season with a 16–8 record and a 3.51 earned run average (ERA).

In February 1947, Blake was among 92 Cardinals players who attended a banquet for the organization's minor leaguers, during which concerns were raised about player compensation. That season, he played for both Columbus teams, appearing in 29 games and posting a combined 4.46 ERA. Ahead of the 1948 season, Blake was promoted to the Rochester Red Wings of the International League. He appeared in 34 games, including seven starts, and recorded a 7–6 record with a 3.88 ERA.

In 1949, Blake spent most of the season with Rochester. On August 9, he was traded to the Cincinnati Reds in exchange for Mike Schultz, ending his tenure with the Cardinals. He finished the season with the Syracuse Chiefs, compiling a combined 5–4 record and a 4.78 ERA.

== Minor leagues and Reds career ==
Blake began the 1950 season with the Syracuse Chiefs, spending most of the year as a starting pitcher rather than a reliever. He started 23 games and finished the season with a 12–8 record and a 3.51 earned run average (ERA).

In 1951, Blake was regarded as having a slim chance of making the major league roster. Nevertheless, he made his major league debut on May 1, 1951, against the Philadelphia Phillies. He appeared in three games for the Cincinnati Reds, finishing two of them. In four innings pitched, he allowed five runs and three home runs, recording an ERA of 11.25.

While with the Reds in 1951, Blake was part of a bullpen group humorously dubbed the "bullpen union," led by Jim Blackburn. The group drafted mock by-laws requesting amenities such as a smoking lounge and sandwiches between doubleheaders.

Blake spent most of the 1951 season with the Columbus Red Birds, making 27 appearances (23 starts). He posted a 7–15 record with a 5.91 ERA. Despite his losing record, he led the team in innings pitched and tied for second in wins. He also led the team in losses, on a squad that finished with a 53–101 record.

In 1952, Blake spent most of the season with the Milwaukee Brewers of the American Association but also made two relief appearances for the Reds, pitching three shutout innings and allowing three hits. With the Brewers, he pitched in 21 games—starting 19—and recorded a 10–3 record with a 3.96 ERA.

Blake opened the 1953 season with another brief stint for Cincinnati, appearing in one game on April 17 against the Milwaukee Brewers. In that outing, he allowed two earned runs on a hit and a walk without recording an out. He spent the remainder of the season with the Indianapolis Indians, where he became a key part of the pitching staff. In 29 appearances, he posted a 14–7 record with a 3.76 ERA over 208 innings. He led the team in wins, innings pitched, and games started.

== Maple Leafs and Athletics career ==
The 1953 season marked Blake's final appearance with the Cincinnati Reds. On February 1, 1954, he was purchased by the Toronto Maple Leafs, an unaffiliated team in the International League. Blake spent six seasons with the Maple Leafs, during which he experienced some of the most successful years of his professional career.

In 1954, Blake teamed with Connie Johnson to lead Toronto to a 97–57 record. He started 30 games, pitched 209 innings, and finished the season with a 15–9 record and a 3.92 ERA, leading the team in starts and innings pitched. The following year, he again played a key role—alongside Johnson and Jack Crimian—in helping Toronto win 94 games. On July 10, 1955, Blake became the first pitcher in the International League to reach 13 wins, defeating the Columbus team 7–4. He concluded the 1955 season with a 17–13 record and a 3.94 ERA.

In 1956, Blake was part of the Maple Leafs' formidable "big three" rotation alongside Don Johnson and league Most Valuable Player Lynn Lovenguth. The trio combined for 750 innings pitched and 57 complete games, frequently pitching on just two days' rest. That year, Blake recorded a 17–11 record with a 2.61 ERA and led the team in shutouts with six.

Following the 1956 season, Blake was selected by the Kansas City Athletics in the Rule 5 draft. The day after his selection, the Athletics intended to include him in an eight-player trade with the Detroit Tigers involving Virgil Trucks and others. However, Commissioner Ford Frick vetoed Blake's inclusion, stating it was "against the spirit of the draft." Former Toronto teammate Jack Crimian was substituted into the deal in Blake’s place.

Blake spent most of the 1957 season back with Toronto but also made two brief appearances for the Athletics in April, marking his final stint in the major leagues. His performance that year declined, as he finished with an 8–9 record and a 5.54 ERA. In 1958, Blake missed five weeks due to injury, but still managed to appear in 23 games, winning nine and lowering his ERA to 3.54.

In 1959, Blake split his final professional season between Toronto and the Houston Buffs, finishing with a combined record of 3–10.

== Personal and later life ==
After his playing career ended, Blake pursued a career in plumbing. He worked in the plumbing industry for nearly 50 years and served as president of Plumbers Local 360.

Blake was married to his wife, Carol Jean, for 47 years until her death. The couple had two children: a son, Ed, and a daughter, Peggy. His son, also named Ed Blake, was a professional baseball player who pitched in the Baltimore Orioles' farm system from 1970 to 1973, reaching as high as the Double-A Asheville Orioles.

Blake died in Swansea, Illinois, at the age of 83 following a long illness. He is interred at Mount Carmel Cemetery in Belleville, Illinois.
