= Jonathan Kozol =

American activist and educator

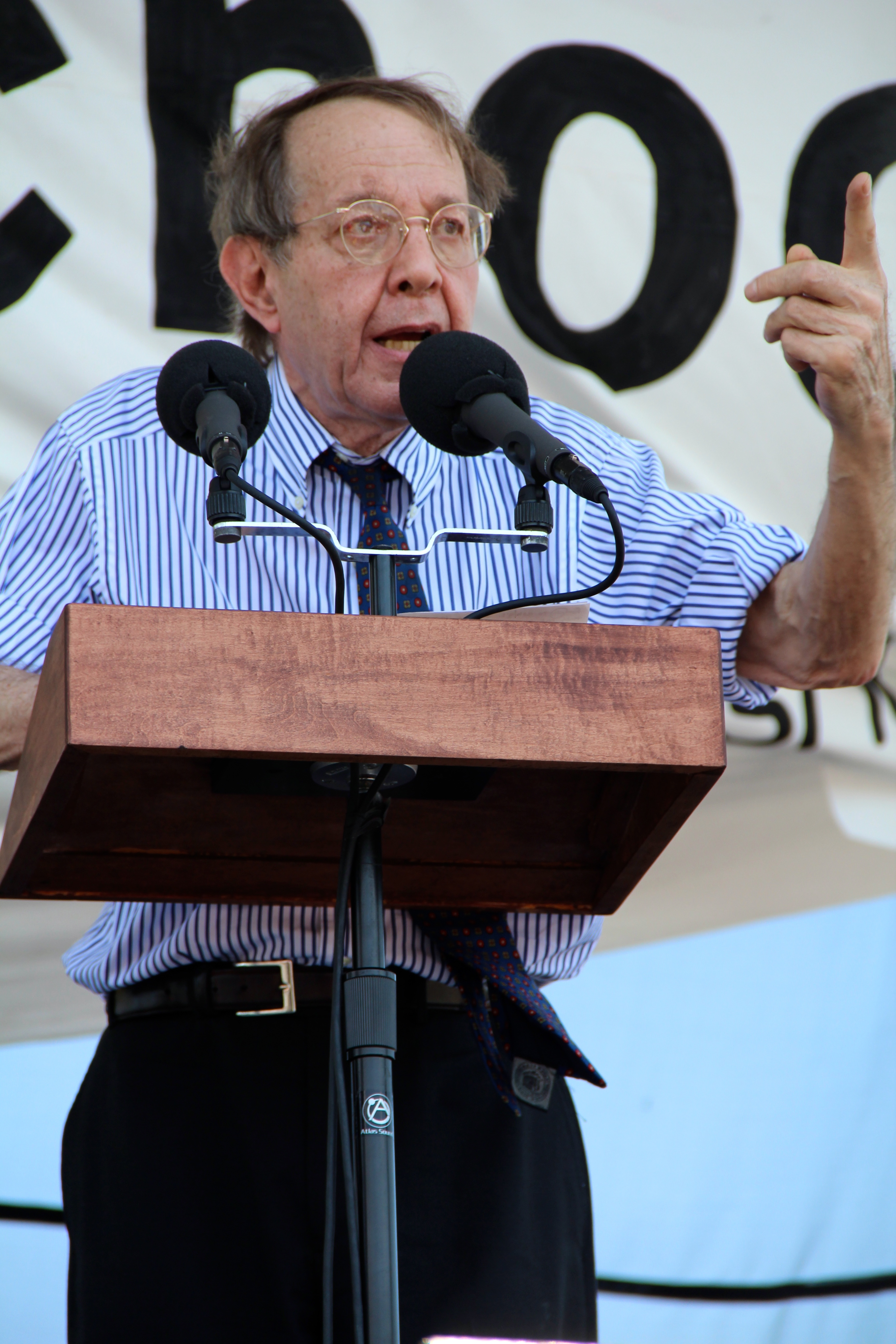
- Kozol in 2011
- Born: September 5, 1936 (age 90); Boston, Massachusetts, U.S.
- Education: Harvard University (AB); Magdalen College, Oxford
- Occupation: Writer
- Writing career
- Subjects: Multicultural education, Critical theory, Education reform

Jonathan Kozol (born September 5, 1936) is an American writer, progressive activist, and educator, best known for his books on public education in the United States.

== Early life, family and education ==
Jonathan Kozol was born to Jewish parents Harry Kozol and Ruth (Massell) Kozol in Boston, Massachusetts in 1936. He attended Noble and Greenough School, graduating in 1954.

After graduating summa cum laude from Harvard University in 1958 with a B.A. in English literature, Kozol was awarded a Rhodes Scholarship to Magdalen College, Oxford. He did not, however, complete his scholarship, deciding instead to go to Paris so he could learn to write from accomplished authors like William Styron, Richard Wright, and other American expatriates who were living in Paris at the time.

== Career beginnings ==
After returning to the United States, Kozol started tutoring children in Roxbury, Massachusetts. He soon became a teacher in the Boston Public Schools, but was fired for teaching a poem by the noted Black writer Langston Hughes. He then became deeply involved in the civil rights movement. Kozol subsequently taught in Newton Public Schools, which he had attended as a child, remaining there for several years before becoming more deeply involved in social justice work and dedicating more time to writing.

Kozol has held two Guggenheim Fellowships, has twice been a fellow of the Rockefeller Foundation, and has also received fellowships from the Field and Ford Foundations.

Kozol also has worked in the field of social psychology. Kozol is currently on the editorial board of Greater Good Magazine, published by the Greater Good Science Center at the University of California, Berkeley. His contributions include the interpretation of scientific research into the roots of compassion, altruism, and peaceful human relationships.

== Writing career ==
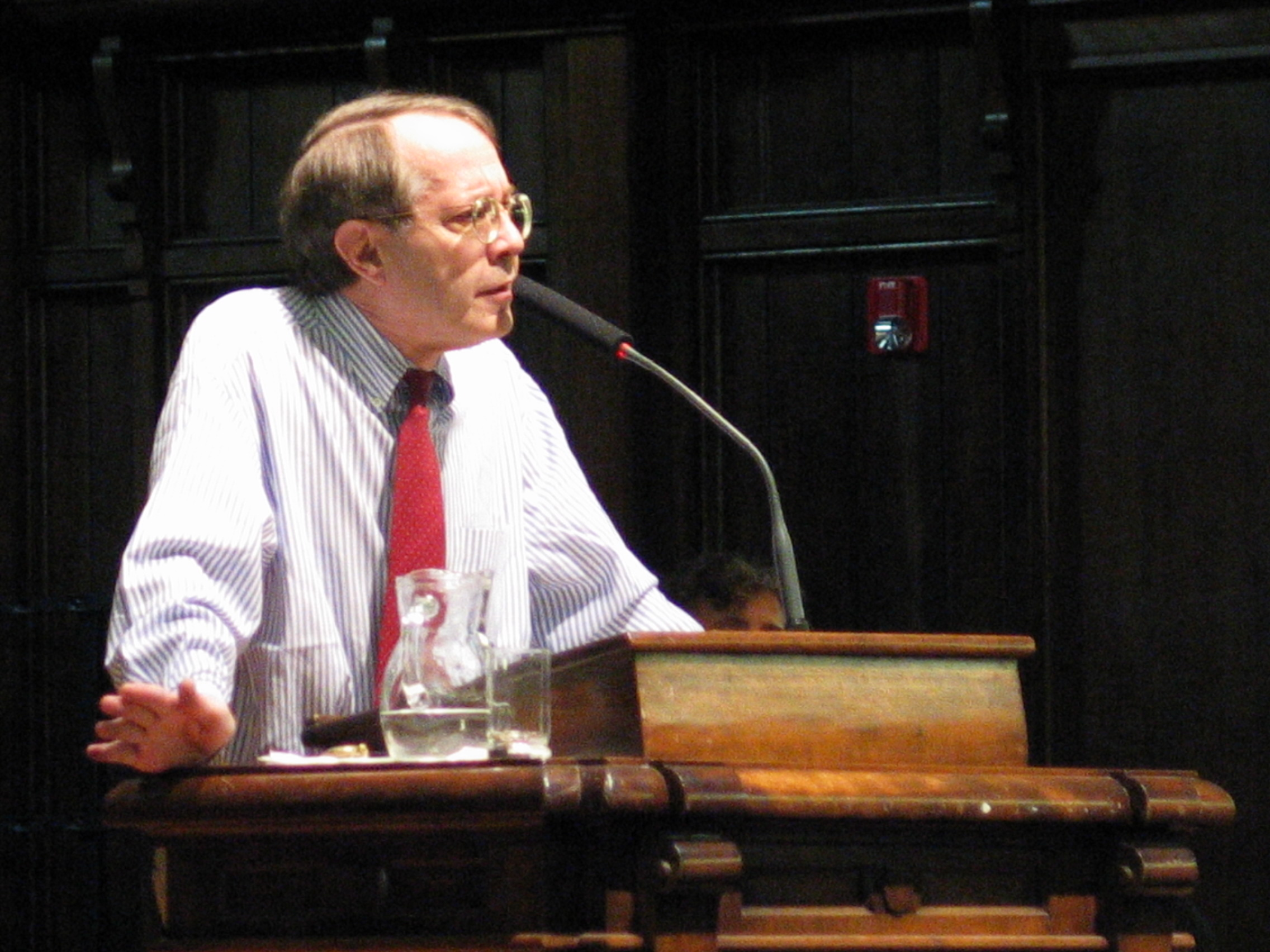
Kozol at Pomona College, 2003

Kozol's first non-fiction book, Death at an Early Age, published in 1967, is an account of his first year as a teacher in the Boston Public Schools. It won the National Book Award for Science, Philosophy and Religion. It has sold more than two million copies in the United States and Europe.

Among other books by Kozol are Rachel and Her Children: Homeless Families in America, which received the Robert F. Kennedy Book award for 1989 and the Conscience-in-Media Award of the American Society of Journalists and Authors, and Savage Inequalities: Children in America's Schools, which won the New England Book Award and was a finalist for the National Book Critics Circle Award in 1992.

His 1995 book, Amazing Grace: The Lives of Children and the Conscience of a Nation, described his visits to the South Bronx of New York City, the poorest congressional district in the United States. It received the Anisfield-Wolf Book Award in 1996.

He published Ordinary Resurrections: Children in the Years of Hope in 2000 and The Shame of the Nation: The Restoration of Apartheid Schooling in America was released September 13, 2005. Kozol documents the continuing and often worsening segregation in public schools in the United States, and the increasing influence of neoconservative ideology on the way children, particularly children of color and poor children of urban areas, are educated.

== Awards and honors ==
- 1968 National Book Award (for Death at an Early Age)
- 1970 and 1980 Guggenheim Fellowships
- 1972 and 1974 Field Foundation Fellowships
- 1978 and 1983 Rockefeller Fellowships
- 1988 Conscience in Media Award from the American Society of Journalists and Authors
- 1988 Christopher Award
- 1992 New England Book Award
- 1996 Anisfield-Wolf Book Award (for Amazing Grace)
- 2005 Puffin/Nation Prize for Creative Citizenship
- 2013 The Deborah W. Meier Hero in Education Award from FairTest

== Books ==
- The Fume of Poppies (1958) A novel.
- Death at an Early Age: The Destruction of the Hearts and Minds of Negro Children in the Boston Public Schools. First published in 1967, it won the National Book Award and sold more than two million copies. It describes his year of teaching in the Boston Public School System. Reissue ISBN 0-452-26292-5
- Free Schools (1972) ISBN 0-395-13606-7
- The Night is Dark and I Am Far from Home (1975) ISBN 0-395-20727-4
- Children of the Revolution: A Yankee Teacher in the Cuban Schools (1978) ISBN 0-440-00982-0
- Prisoners of Silence: Breaking the Bonds of Adult Illiteracy in the United States (1980) ISBN 0-816-49004-X
- On Being a Teacher (1981) ISBN 1-85168-065-9
- Alternative Schools: A Guide for Educators and Parents (1982) ISBN 0-826-40226-7
- Illiterate America (1986) ISBN 0-452-25807-3
- Rachel and Her Children: Homeless Families in America (1988) Awarded the Robert F. Kennedy Book Award for 1989 and The Conscience in Media Award of the American Society of Journalists and Authors, and the Christopher Award, 1988. Reprint ISBN 0-449-90339-7
- Savage Inequalities: Children in America's Schools (1991) A finalist for the 1992 National Book Critics Circle Award and awarded The New England Book Award. Reprint ISBN 0-060-97499-0 Bookfinder collected reviews.
- Amazing Grace: The Lives of Children and the Conscience of a Nation (1995) Reprint ISBN 0-060-97697-7 Review and appreciation by Mary Leue.
- Ordinary Resurrections: Children in the Years of Hope (2000) Reprint ISBN 0-060-95645-3. Review by Jana Siciliano at BookReporter.com.
- The Shame of the Nation: The Restoration of Apartheid Schooling in America (2005) ISBN 1-400-05244-0
- Letters to a Young Teacher (2007) ISBN 978-0-307-39371-5
- Fire in the Ashes: Twenty-Five Years Among the Poorest Children in America (2012) ISBN 1-400-05246-7
- The Theft of Memory: Losing My Father One Day at a Time (2015) ISBN 978-0-804-14099-7
- The End to Inequality: Breaking Down the Walls of Apartheid Education in America (2024 ISBN 978-1-620-97872-6
- We Shall Not Bow Down: Children of Color Under Siege: An Invocation to Resistance (2026) ISBN 978-1-64421-530-2

== See also ==
- Education in the United States
- Racial inequality in the United States
